= Sandwich and Pegwell Bay =

Nature reserve in Kent, England

Coordinates: 51.320°N 1.358°E

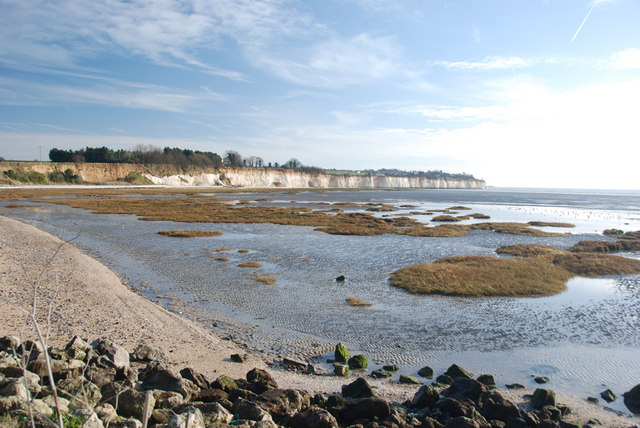
- Interactive map of Sandwich and Pegwell Bay
- Type: Nature reserve
- Location: Ramsgate, Kent
- OS grid: TR 341 632
- Area: 615 hectares (1,520 acres)
- Manager: Kent Wildlife Trust

Sandwich and Pegwell Bay is a 615-hectare (1,520-acre) nature reserve in Kent, managed by the Kent Wildlife Trust. It is a National Nature Reserve, and it includes a Geological Conservation Review site, Prince's Beachlands Local Nature Reserve and two Special Areas of Conservation, Sandwich Bay and Thanet Coast. It is part of Sandwich Bay and Thanet Coast Ramsar site and Special Protection Area. It is also of Sandwich Bay to Hacklinge Marshes Site of Special Scientific Interest and Sandwich/Pegwell Bay Nature Conservation Review site, Grade I.

This site has the only ancient dune pasture in the county, and other habitats include inter-tidal mudflats, saltmarshes, shingle beaches, sand dunes and chalk cliffs. It is internationally important for its bird life.
