= Prince's Beachlands =

Nature reserve in Kent, England

Coordinates: 51.299°N 1.374°E

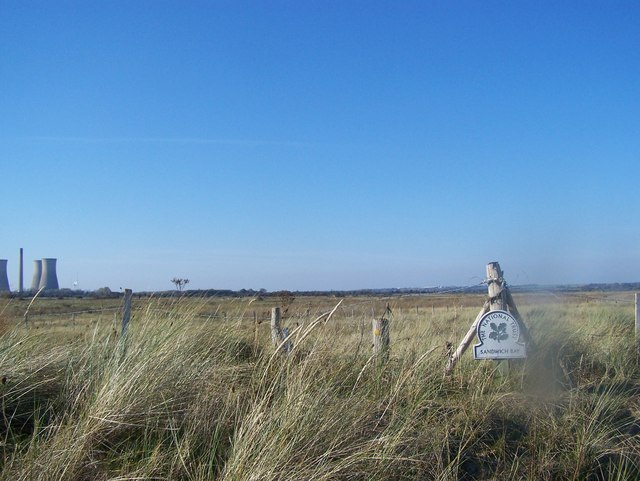
- Interactive map of Prince's Beachlands
- Type: Local Nature Reserve
- Location: , Kent
- OS grid: TR 353 610
- Area: 6.0 hectares (15 acres)
- Manager: Kent Wildlife Trust

Prince's Beachlands is a 6-hectare (15-acre) Local Nature Reserve north of Sandwich in Kent. It is owned by Dover Town Council and managed by Kent Wildlife Trust as part of the Sandwich Bay to Hacklinge Marshes nature reserve. It is part of the Sandwich and Pegwell Bay Nature Conservation Review site, Grade I, Thanet Coast and Sandwich Bay Ramsar site, Sandwich Bay Special Area of Conservation, Thanet Coast and Sandwich Bay Special Protection Area and Sandwich Bay to Hacklinge Marshes Site of Special Scientific Interest.

This site has diverse habitats and it is internationally important for its seabirds. It is also notable for its butterflies, fungi and reptiles.

The Stour Valley Walk runs through the site.
