= Westfield Wood =

Nature reserve in Kent, England

Coordinates: 51.318°N 0.517°E

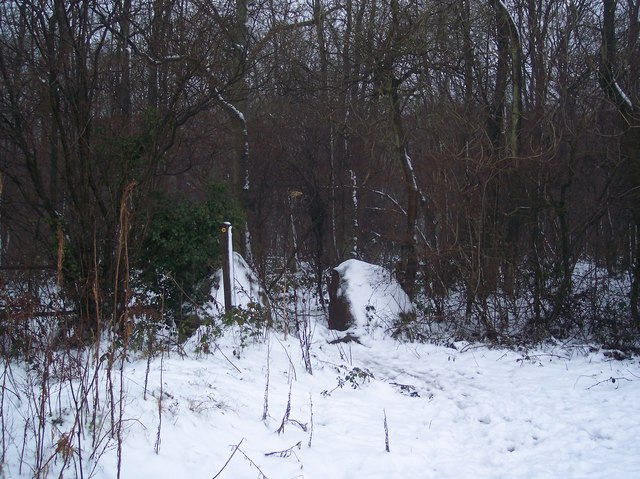
- Interactive map of Westfield Wood
- Type: Nature reserve
- Location: Maidstone, Kent
- OS grid: TQ 755 607
- Area: 5 hectares (12 acres)
- Manager: Kent Wildlife Trust

Westfield Wood is a 5-hectare (12-acre) nature reserve north of Maidstone in Kent, which is managed by the Kent Wildlife Trust. It is part of the Wouldham to Detling Escarpment Site of Special Scientific Interest and Nature Conservation Review site, Grade I. It is also in the North Downs Woodlands Special Area of Conservation and the Kent Downs Area of Outstanding Natural Beauty.

== Description ==
This five-and-a-half hectare site is part of an internationally important yew woodland complex. The steep chalky slopes of the central part of the wood are occupied by a dense stand of yew overtopped in places by mature ash and beech, with some field maple, wild cherry and oak. Some of the beech trees are fine specimens whilst others have died and provide important dead wood habitat for many insects and fungi.

A large section in the centre of the reserve was flattened by the October 1987 storm. This area has been left untouched and is monitored to record natural regeneration after this natural disturbance event.

On deeper soils in the northern part and in more level areas, hazel and ash coppice occurs. Here oak is more abundant, and crab apple can be found. Diligent search may yield butcher's-broom and green hellebore, whilst at the southern end, is stinking hellebore. There is also a fine colony of stinking iris, its orange seeds persisting through the winter.

Down the western edge, a good mixture of shrubs includes burnet rose, guelder-rose, spindle, wayfaring-tree and wild privet. The more common orchids of chalk scrub and woodland are present, mainly in one or two small clearings and at the field margins, but all are scarce. Many common woodland bird species are present including green and great spotted woodpecker, and goldcrest. During October and November flocks of thrushes can be seen feeding on the crop of yew berries.
