= The Larches =

The Larches can refer to:

- The Larches (Cambridge, Massachusetts), United States, an historic house
- The Larches, Kent, a nature reserve in England
- The Larches, Monmouthshire, a hillfort in Wales, United Kingdom
