= Collingwood Nature Reserve =

Nature reserve in Kent, England

Coordinates: 51.035°N 0.509°E

Collingwood
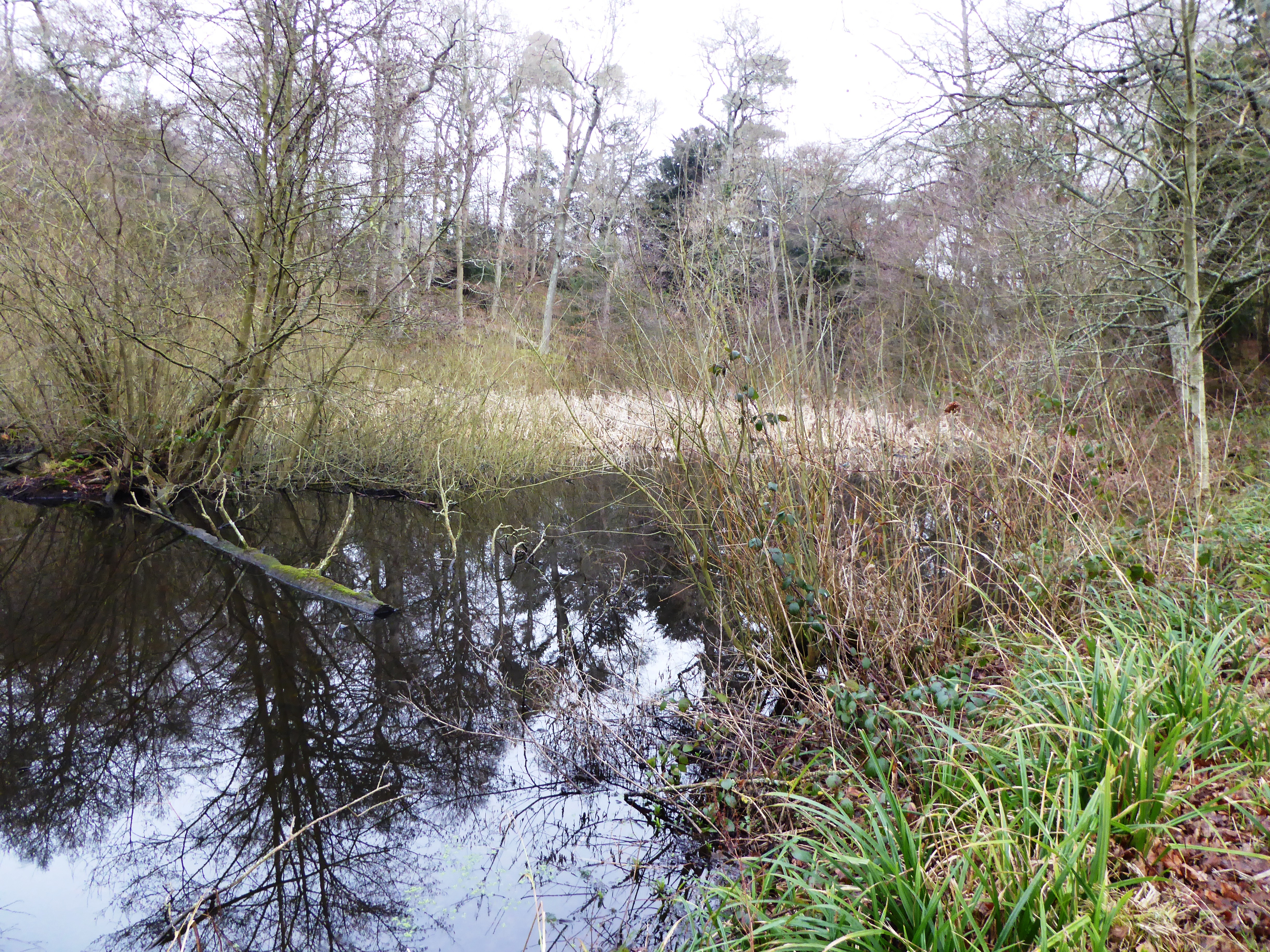
- Interactive map of Collingwood
- Type: Nature reserve
- Location: Hawkhurst, Kent
- OS grid: TQ 760 292
- Area: 3 hectares (7.4 acres)
- Manager: Kent Wildlife Trust

Collingwood is a 3-hectare (7.4-acre) nature reserve south of Hawkhurst in Kent. It is managed by the Kent Wildlife Trust.

This reserve is woodland which has many exotic species as well as native trees. It is centred on a lake which has birds such as mallards, kingfishers and moorhens.

There is access from Stream Lane.
