= Conningbrook Lakes Country Park =

Nature reserve in Kent, England

Coordinates: 51.156°N 0.899°E

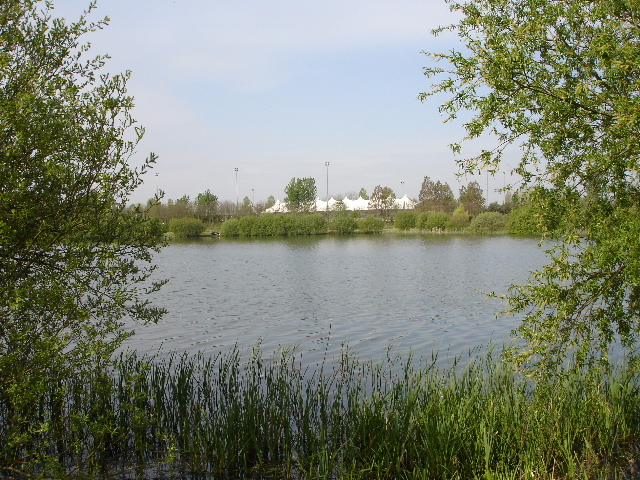
- Interactive map of Conningbrook Lakes Country Park
- Type: Nature reserve
- Location: Ashford, Kent
- OS grid: TR028436
- Area: 34.3 hectares (85 acres)
- Manager: Kent Wildlife Trust

Conningbrook Lakes Country Park is a 34.3-hectare (85-acre) nature reserve in Kennington, Ashford in Kent. It is managed by Kent Wildlife Trust.

There are three lakes in these former gravel pits, and other habitats are ponds, a river, grassland and wet woodland. In the winter there are migratory wildfowl and wetland birds such as wigeon, tufted duck and gadwall.

There is access from Willesborough Road.
