= Turners Field =

Nature reserve in Kent, England

Coordinates: 51.074°N 0.685°E

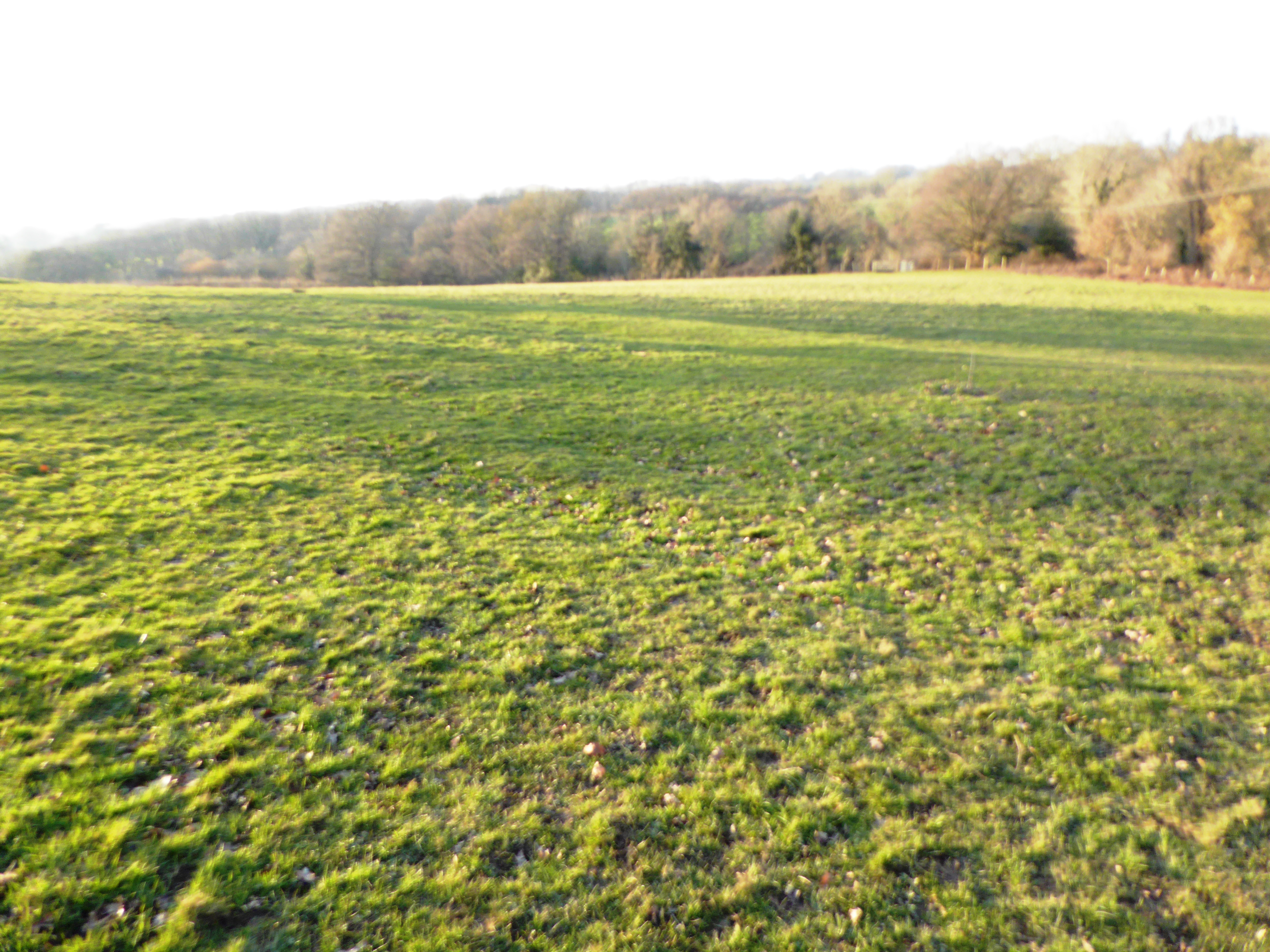
- Interactive map of Turners Field
- Type: Nature reserve
- Location: Tenderden, Kent
- OS grid: TQ 882 340
- Area: 11 hectares (27 acres)
- Manager: Kent Wildlife Trust

Turners Field is an 11-hectare (27-acre) nature reserve on the western outskirts of Tenterden in Kent. It is managed by Kent Wildlife Trust.

This field is managed as part of an organic farm, and has grassland, a stream, a pond, scrub and mature woodland. Herbs include pepper saxifrage, black knapweed and bird's-foot trefoil.

There is access from Drury Road.
