= Sladden Wood =

Nature reserve in Kent, England

Coordinates: 51.140°N 1.225°E

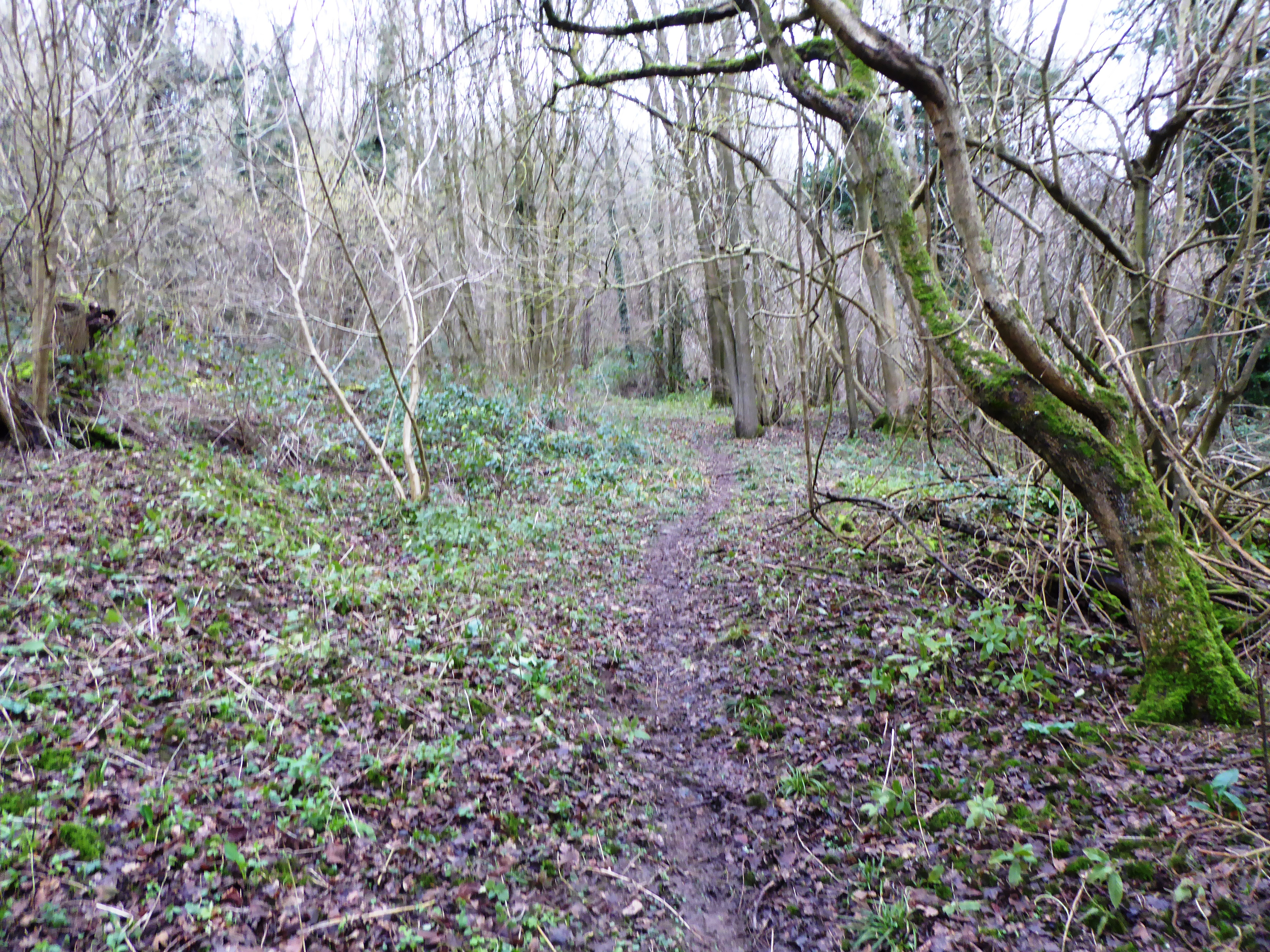
- Interactive map of Sladden Wood
- Type: Nature reserve
- Location: Alkham, Kent
- OS grid: TR 257 428
- Area: 7 hectares (17 acres)
- Manager: Kent Wildlife Trust

Sladden Wood is a 7-hectare (17-acre) nature reserve north of Alkham in Kent. It is managed by the Kent Wildlife Trust.

The main trees in this wood are hornbeam, field maple and hazel, and there are ground flora such as green hellebore and yellow archangel.

There is access by a footpath from Alkham.
