= Ivy Hatch Nature Reserve =

Nature reserve in Ivy Hatch, Kent, England

Coordinates: 51.269°N 0.274°E

Ivy Hatch
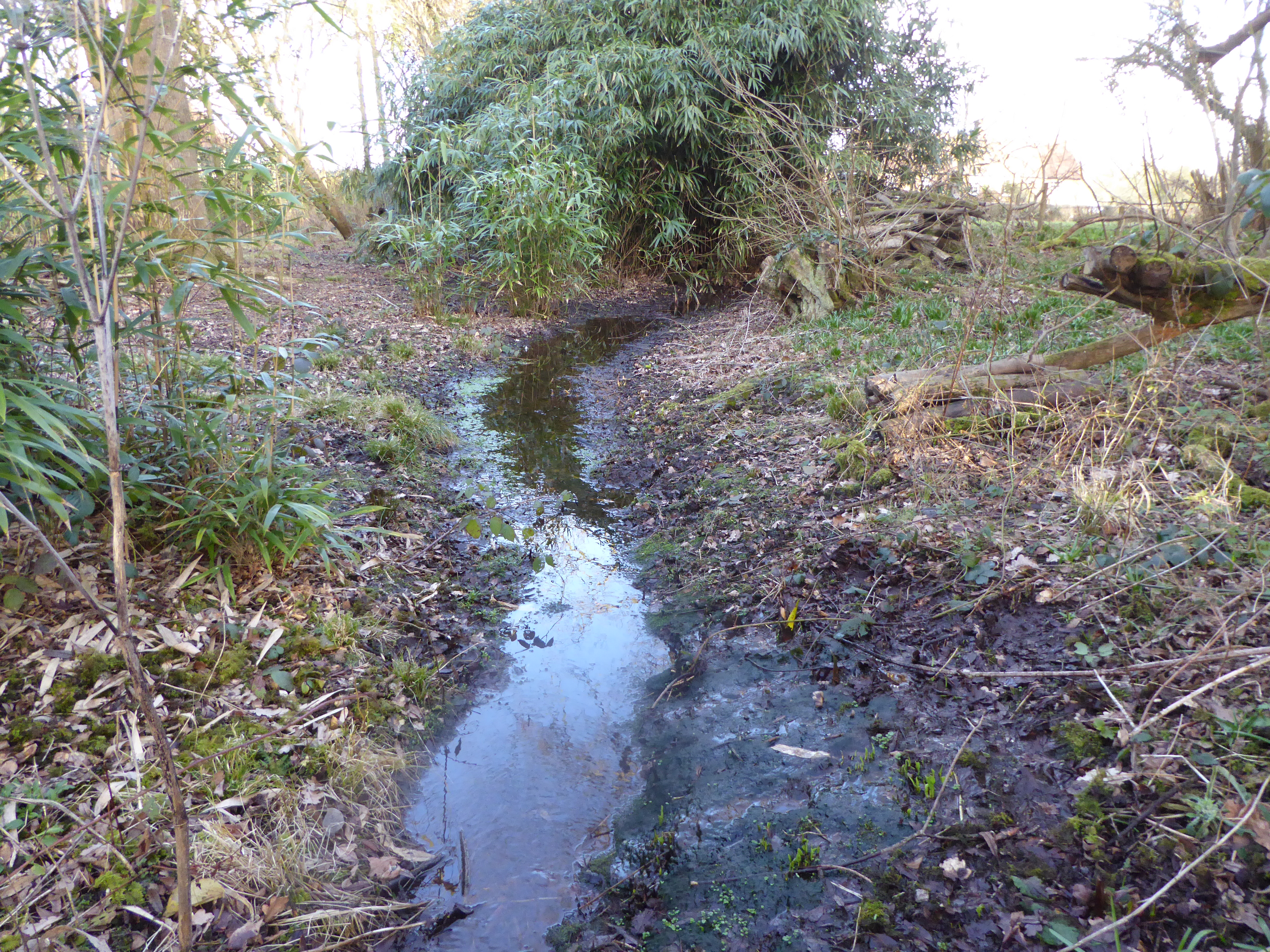
- Interactive map of Ivy Hatch
- Type: Nature reserve
- Location: , Kent
- OS grid: TQ 587 547
- Area: 0.5 hectares (1.2 acres)
- Manager: Kent Wildlife Trust

Ivy Hatch Nature Reserve in Ivy Hatch, north of Tonbridge in Kent, is a 0.5-hectare (1.2-acre) reserve managed by the Kent Wildlife Trust.

Several streams run through this small site, and there are many wetland plants, including sphagnum moss. There are many common spotted orchids, and trees such as alders and hazels.

There is access from Ismays Road.
