= Romney Warren Country Park =

Nature reserve in Kent, England

Coordinates: 50.997°N 0.96°E

Romney Warren
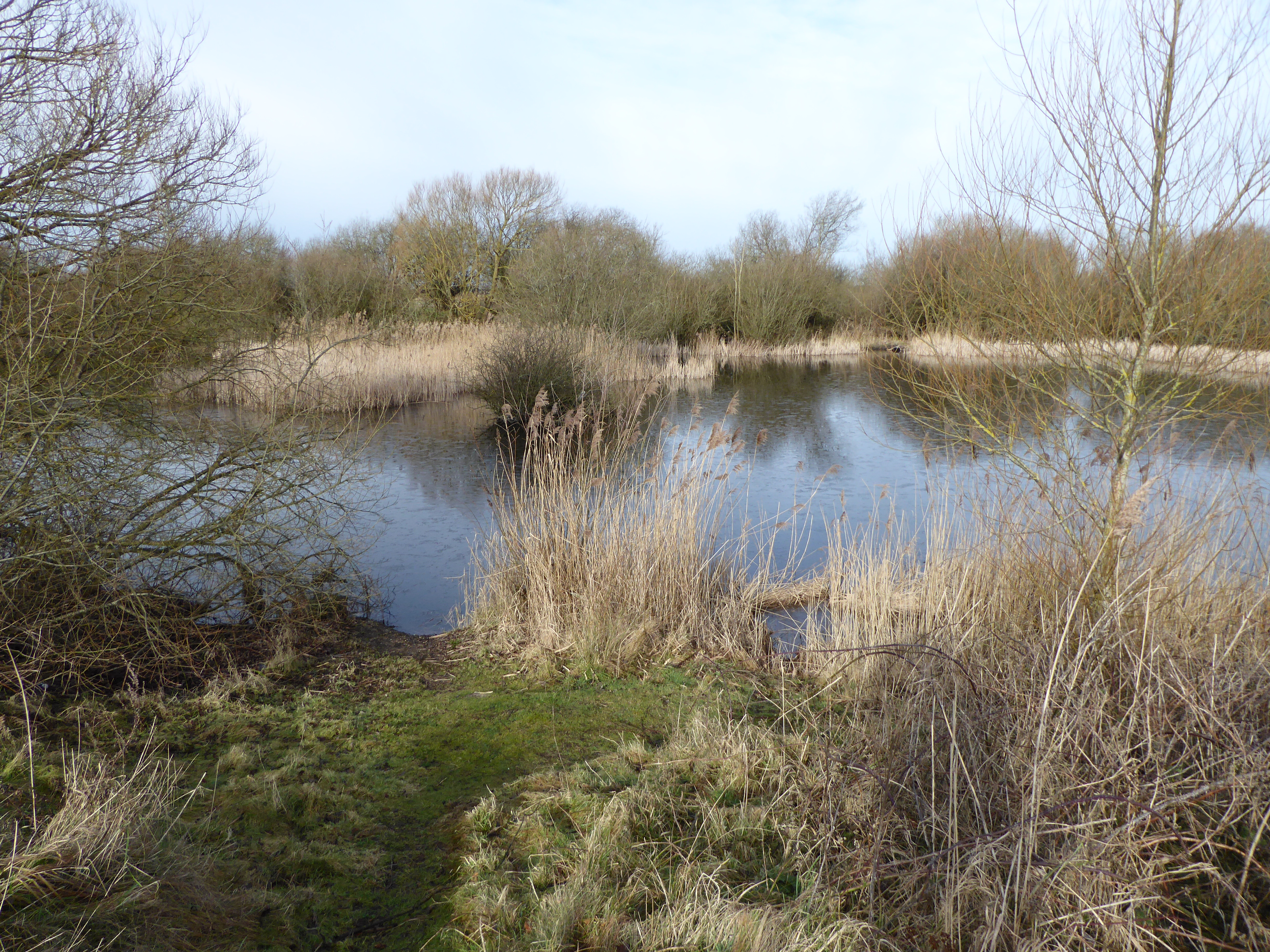
- Interactive map of Romney Warren
- Type: Local Nature Reserve
- Location: New Romney, Kent
- OS grid: TR 078 261
- Area: 10.9 hectares (27 acres)
- Manager: Romney Warren Project

Romney Warren or Romney Marsh is a 10.9-hectare (27-acre) country park and Local Nature Reserve in New Romney in Kent. It is owned by Folkestone and Hythe District Council and managed by the Romney Warren Project, which is a partnership between Folkestone and Hythe District Council, Romney Warren Charitable Trust, Kent Wildlife Trust and Romney Marsh Countryside Partnership. It is part of the Dungeness, Romney Marsh and Rye Bay Ramsar internationally important wetland site and Site of Special Scientific Interest.

== History ==
The history of Romney Warren begins over two thousand years ago, when sand dunes were formed along the coast. As new sand dunes were formed, sea retreated. Plants then recolonised, the former sand dunes to make a unique plant life environment.

Later, the reclaimed land of the Romney Marshes was used for grazing large numbers of sheep for many centuries. These wool fleeces paid for the large churches in the villages across the marshes.

In 1931 to 1945, sand and gravel was extracted from the land within the country park. These later were made into wildlife ponds. Later the land was then used as a transport depot.

The Romney Warren Project was then established in 1995 with the aims of promoting awareness of the Romney Marsh as an historic landscape while providing training and employment for disabled and unemployed people. It is a partnership between Folkestone and Hythe District Council, Romney Warren Charitable Trust, Nelson Park Gardens (local care home) and Shepway Volunteer Centre, Romney Marsh Countryside Project and Kent Wildlife Trust.

The main visitor centre was designed by the Baker-Brown McKay Partnership. The techniques and materials used mean the building has a life span of at least 100 years. The foundations are steel gabions filled with cobblestones from Lydd, these have been handpicked and filled. The main framework of the building is made of larch, from the West Country. This part was built first so that the roof could be added next, and so a cover was provided for the straw during the next building process. 350 straw bales were placed to form the walls, held together with chestnut poles. Even the roof has been designed with wildlife in mind, as it is covered in sedum as a green roof. The roof covers the building's entire footprint, replacing the habitat which would have otherwise been lost. The building was 'Highly Commended' at the 2003 Kent Design Awards.

== Facilities ==
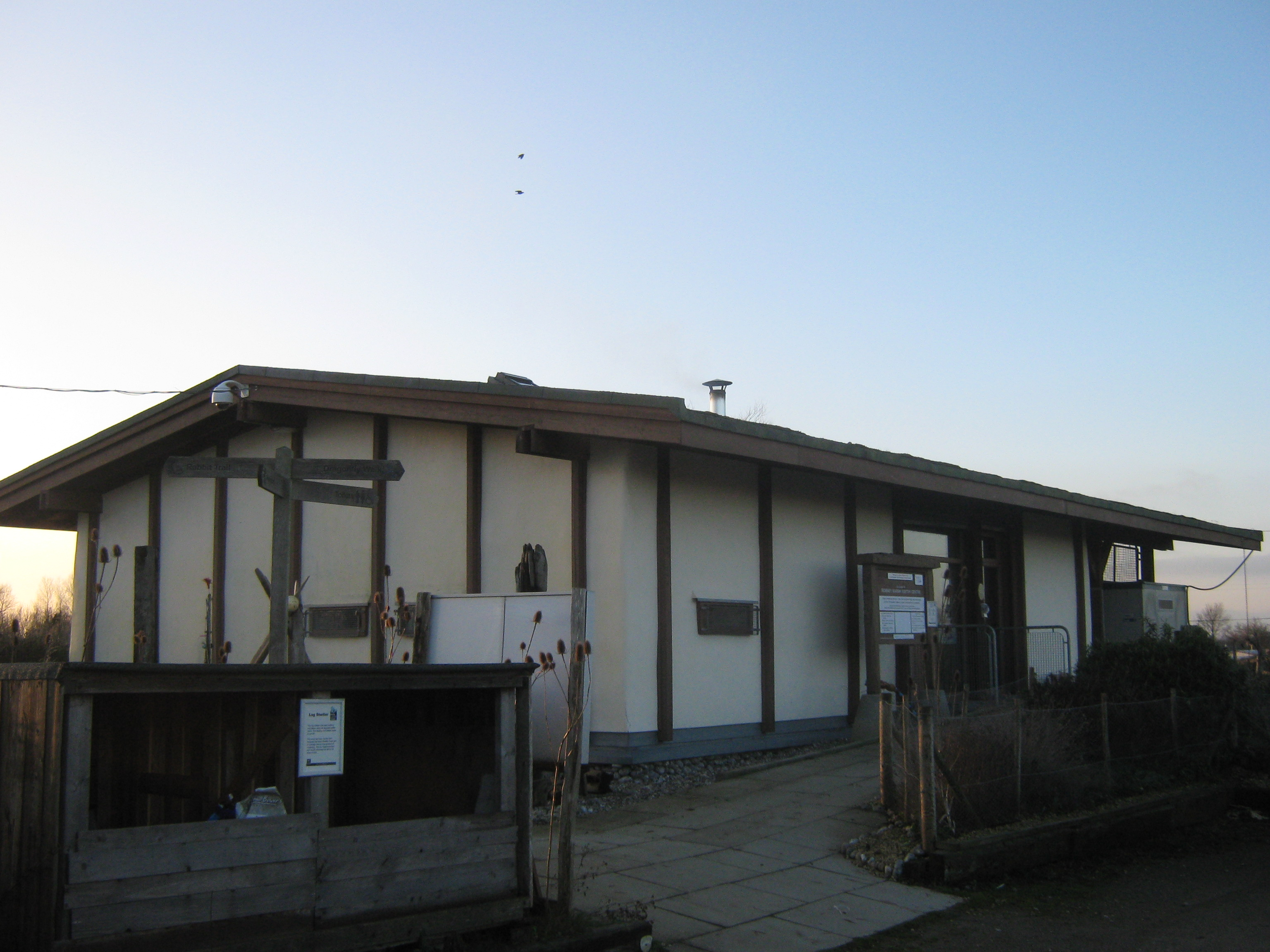
Romney Warren Visitor Centre

As a Site of Special Scientific Interest, it is a nationally important site for great crested newts. Species of special interest include great diving beetles, Small Red-eyed Damselfly and tree sparrow, along with a number of acid grassland plants.

The Romney Warren Project granted a lease to the Kent Wildlife Trust (KWT) to manage the Romney Marsh Visitor Centre. It opened in 2004 and provides facilities for visitors to the Country Park including exhibitions, local information, a shop, toilets and refreshments. Three walking trails - dragonfly, rabbit and sheep – start from the Visitor Centre. There are regular family events held at the park and booked groups are welcome to use the visitor centre.

The Romney Marsh Countryside Project has done a great deal to improve the landscape of Romney Marsh and Dungeness for wildlife and people. Volunteers work at New Romney Warren Country Park to maintain footpaths and a pond created by the Romney Marsh Countryside Project. Part of the site is used by Nelson Park Gardens and Shepway Volunteer Centre as a horticultural and landscaping training scheme for adults from local care homes and the unemployed; their produce is then sold at the Visitor Centre. Romney Marsh Countryside Project also assist with the conservation management and events on site.
