= Spong Wood =

Nature reserve in Kent, England

Coordinates: 51.169°N 1.034°E

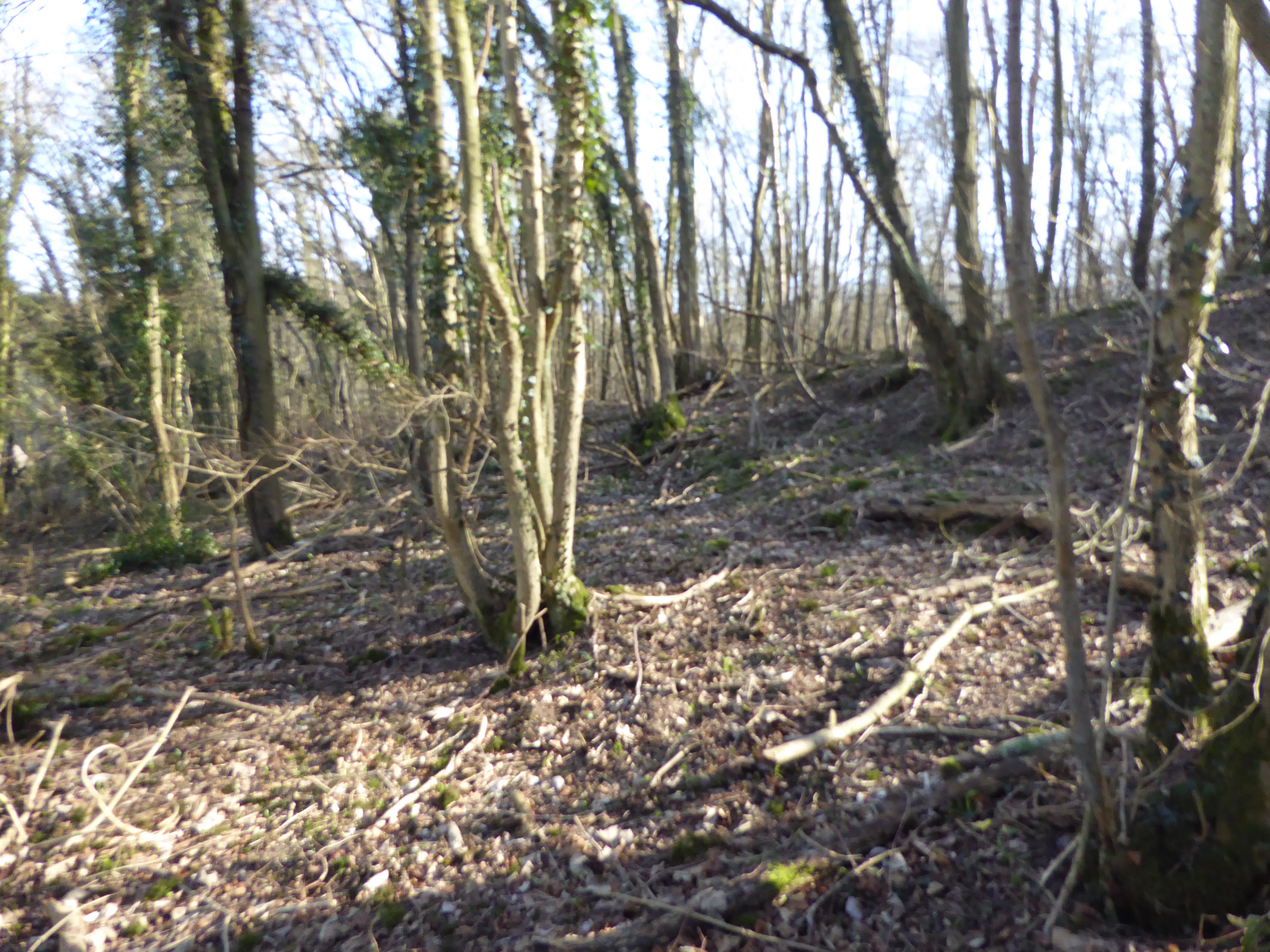
- Interactive map of Spong Wood
- Type: Nature reserve
- Location: Stelling Minnis, Kent
- OS grid: TR 122 455
- Area: 18 hectares (44 acres)
- Manager: Kent Wildlife Trust

Spong Wood is a 18-hectare (44-acre) nature reserve west of Stelling Minnis in Kent. It is managed by Kent Wildlife Trust.

Common trees in this coppiced wood include sweet chestnut, oak, hornbeam and hazel. Orchids can be found on the high slopes and ramsons lower down.

There is access by footpaths to its western corner.
