= Stockbury Hill Wood =

Nature reserve in Kent, England

Coordinates: 51.317°N 0.633°E

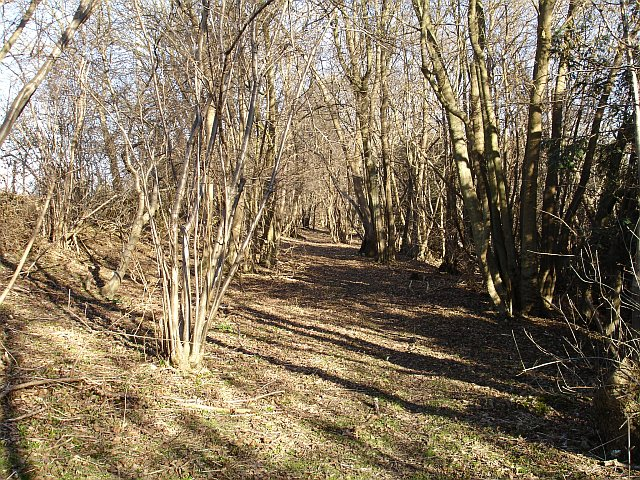
- Interactive map of Stockbury Hill Wood
- Type: Nature reserve
- Location: Stockbury, Kent
- OS grid: TQ 836 608
- Area: 5 hectares (12 acres)
- Manager: Kent Wildlife Trust

Stockbury Hill Wood is a 5-hectare (12-acre) nature reserve near Stockbury, north-east of Maidstone in Kent. It is managed by the Kent Wildlife Trust.

This wood is mainly yew, hornbeam and oak. It has a variety of orchids, such as bird's-nest, lady and fly. There are orange tip and holly blue butterflies.

Access is by prior arrangement with the Trust only.
