= Old Park Hill =

Nature reserve in Kent, England

Coordinates: 51.147°N 1.279°E

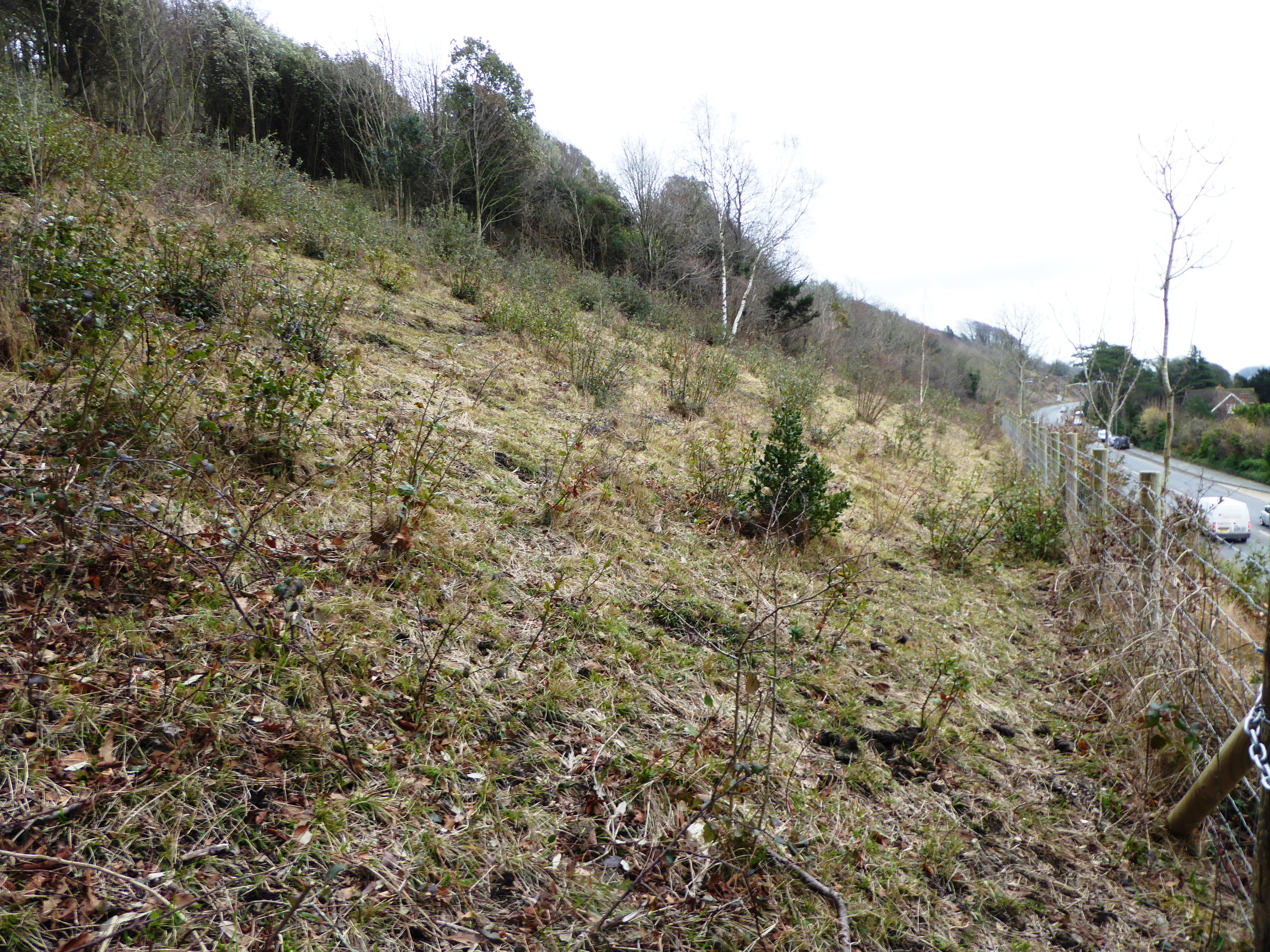
- Interactive map of Old Park Hill
- Type: Nature reserve
- Location: Dover, Kent
- Area: 40 hectares (100 acres)
- Manager: Kent Wildlife Trust

Old Park Hill is a 40-hectare (100-acre) nature reserve north of Dover in Kent. It is managed by the Kent Wildlife Trust (KWT). It is in the Kent Downs Area of Outstanding Natural Beauty.

This steeply sloping hill has woodland, scrub and grassland. The site has not been managed since around 2005, and the KWT is removing scrub to increase restore its mainly grassland habitat, providing an increased area suitable for meadow butterflies, reptiles and orchids.

There is access from Whitfield Hill.
