= Nashenden Down =

Nature reserve in Kent, England

Coordinates: 51.364°N 0.484°E

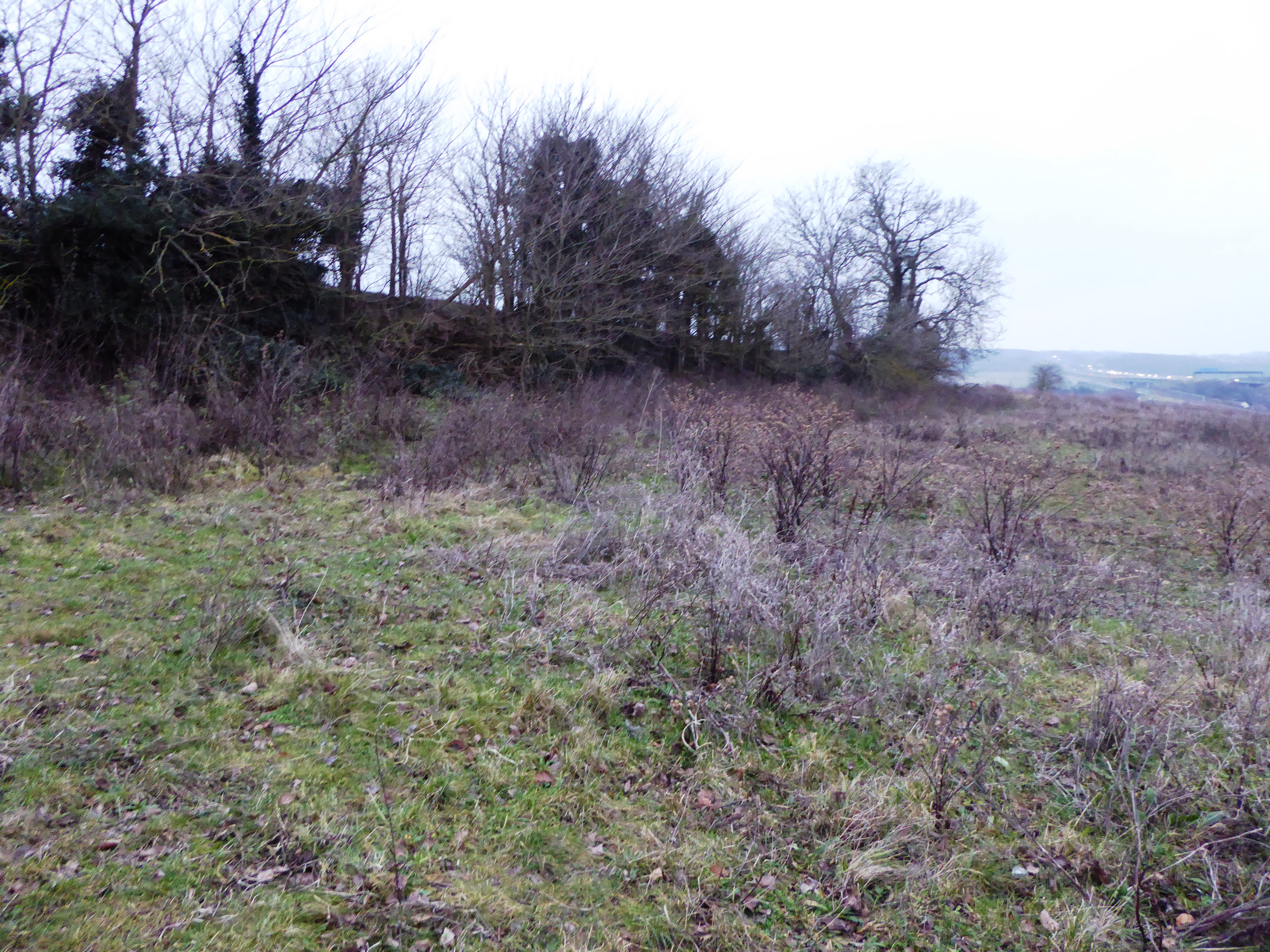
- Interactive map of Nashenden Down
- Type: Nature reserve
- Location: Rochester, Kent
- OS grid: TQ730657
- Area: 55 hectares (140 acres)
- Manager: Kent Wildlife Trust

Nashenden Down is a 55-hectare (140-acre) nature reserve on the southern outskirts of Rochester in Kent. It is managed by the Kent Wildlife Trust, and is in the Kent Downs Area of Outstanding Natural Beauty.

This nature reserve was created from a large arable field in 2009, and it is being regenerated with chalk grassland species, partly by colonisation from a steep bank which escaped ploughing and partly by seed spreading. An area of scrub provides a habitat for birds.

There is access to the site from Nashenden Farm Lane.
