= Cowden Pound Pastures =

Protected area in Kent, England

Coordinates: 51.169°N 0.086°E

- Site of Special Scientific Interest
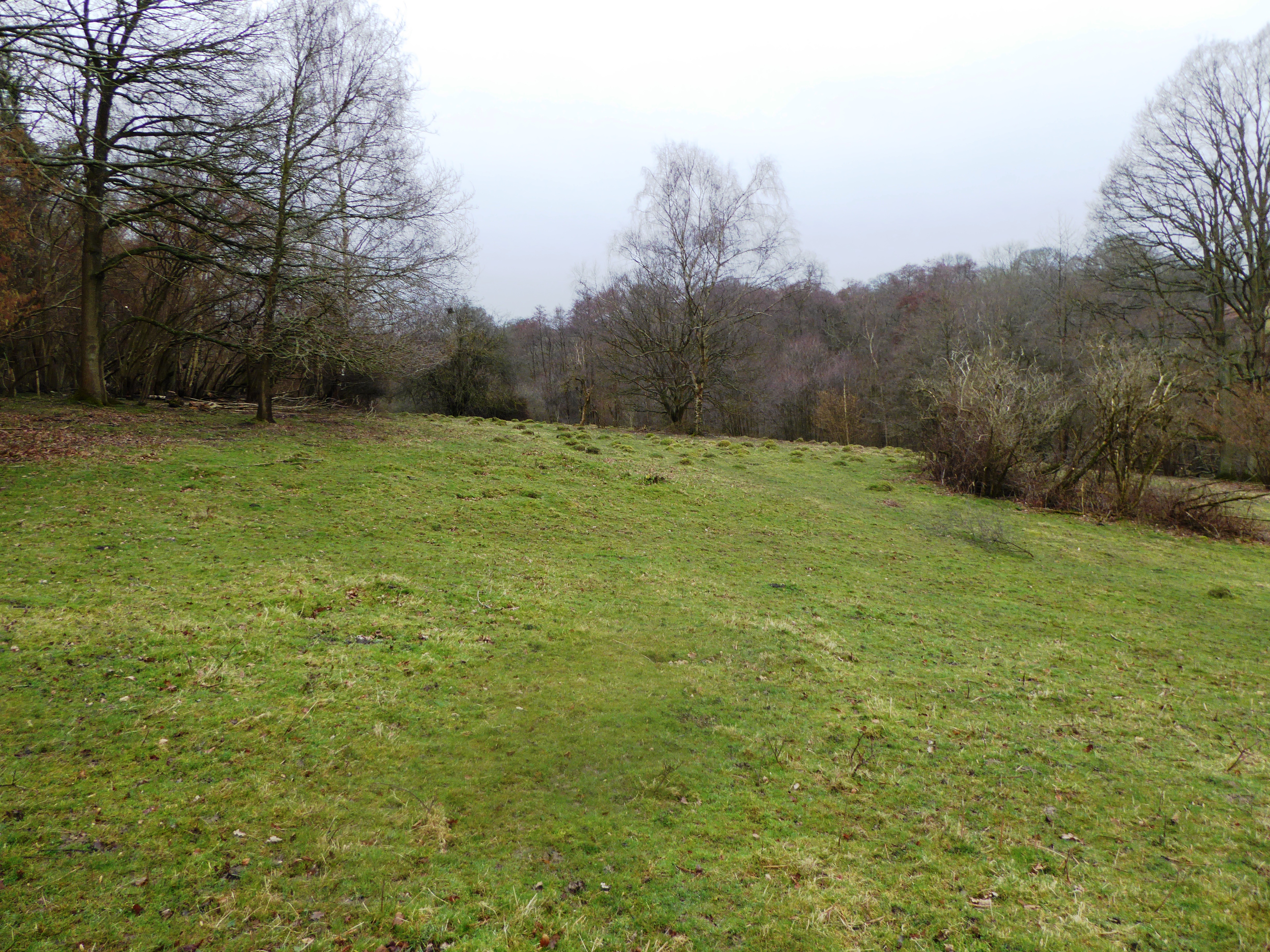
- Location of Cowden Pound Pastures.
- Area of search: Kent
- Grid reference: TQ 459 432
- Interest: Biological
- Area: 5.9 hectares (15 acres)
- Notification date: 1994
- Location map: Magic Map

Cowden Pound Pastures is a 5.9-hectare (15-acre) biological Site of Special Scientific Interest north of Cowden in Kent. It is managed by the Kent Wildlife Trust.

This is unimproved neutral grassland, which is a nationally rare habitat, and it is grazed to prevent scrub invading the pasture. Grasses include crested dog's tail and common knapweed, and an area of wet grassland by a stream has jointed rush and water mint.

There is access from the drive to Walnut Tree Cottage on Hartfield Road, but the gate is padlocked.
