= Oare Meadow =

Nature reserve in Kent, England

Coordinates: 51.331°N 0.879°E

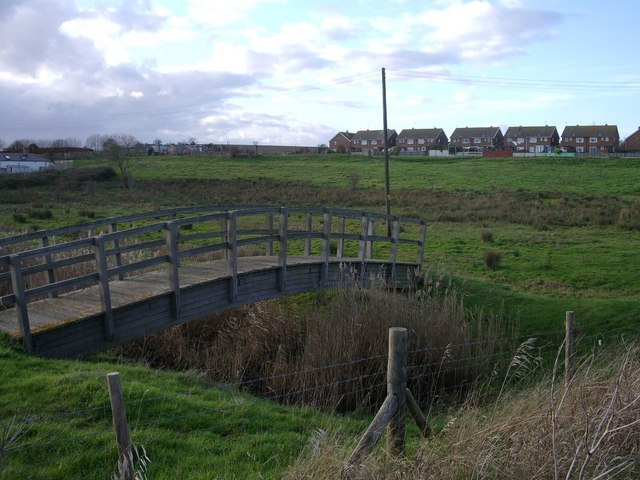
- Interactive map of Oare Meadow
- Type: Nature reserve
- Location: Oare, Kent
- OS grid: TR006630
- Area: 2 hectares (4.9 acres)
- Manager: Kent Wildlife Trust

Oare Meadow is a 2-hectare (4.9-acre) nature reserve in Oare, north of Faversham in Kent. It is managed by the Kent Wildlife Trust. It is part of The Swale Site of Special Scientific Interest.

This small site has a pond and bog, which are fed by a spring. Wetland plants include ragged-robin and yellow iris. There is also a meadow which supports grassland plants.

The site is open to the public.
