= Marden Meadows =

Protected area in Kent, England

Coordinates: 51.173°N 0.518°E

- Site of Special Scientific Interest
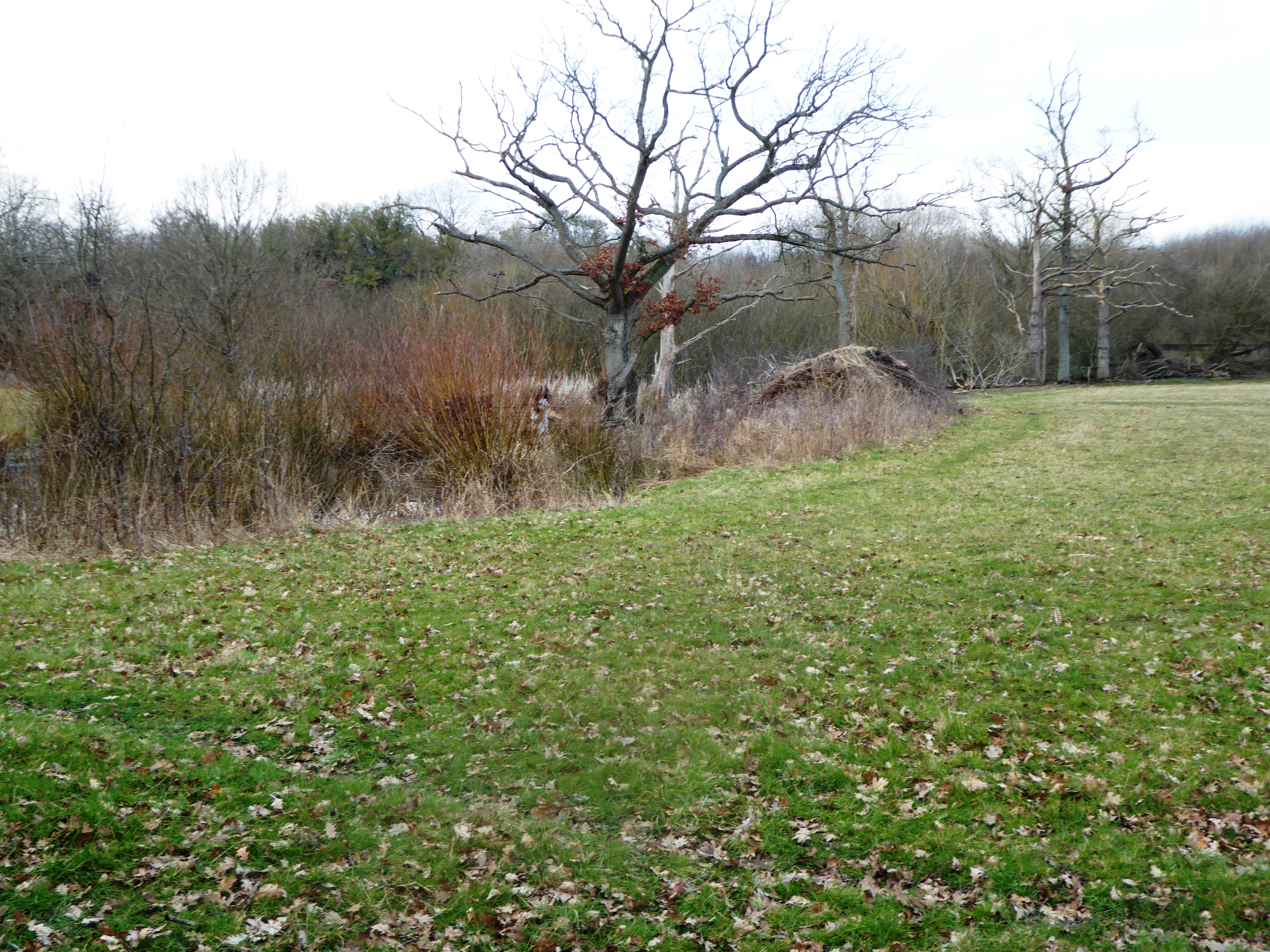
- Location of Marden Meadows.
- Area of search: Kent
- Grid reference: TQ 761 445
- Interest: Biological
- Area: 3.7 hectares (9.1 acres)
- Notification date: 1984
- Location map: Magic Map

Marden Meadows is a 3.7-hectare (9.1-acre) biological Site of Special Scientific Interest east of Marden in Kent. Part of the site is in the 5.6-hectare (14-acre) Marden Meadow nature reserve, which is owned and managed by Kent Wildlife Trust.

These unimproved neutral meadows are cut for hay each year and then grazed. There are also ponds and hedgerows which are probably of ancient origin, and trees include midland hawthorns and wild service-trees.

There is public access to the nature reserve, but the rest of the site is private land with no public access.
