= Quarry Wood, Kent =

Nature reserve in Kent, England

Coordinates: 51.239°N 0.465°E

Quarry Wood
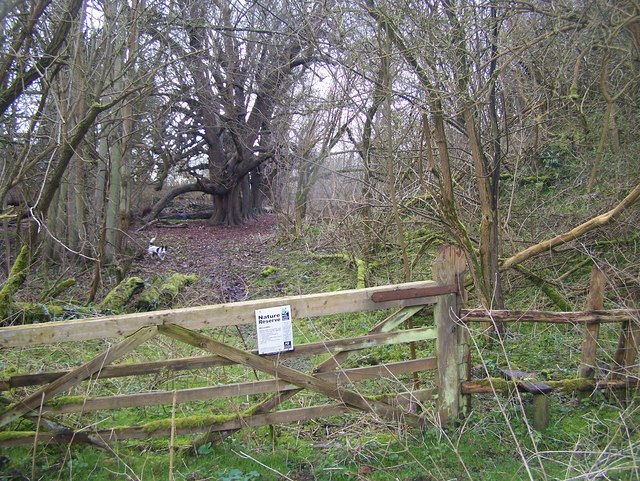
- Interactive map of Quarry Wood
- Type: Nature reserve
- Location: West Farleigh, Kent
- OS grid: TQ 722 518
- Area: 26 hectares (64 acres)
- Manager: Kent Wildlife Trust

Quarry Wood is a 26-hectare (64-acre) nature reserve east of West Farleigh, which is south-west of Maidstone in Kent. It is managed by the Kent Wildlife Trust.

The wood is mainly sweet chestnut coppice, but at the northern end there are mature oak and beech trees. A small stream runs along the bottom of the valley.

The site is open to the public.
