= Brenchley Wood =

Nature reserve in Kent, England

Coordinates: 51.154°N 0.355°E

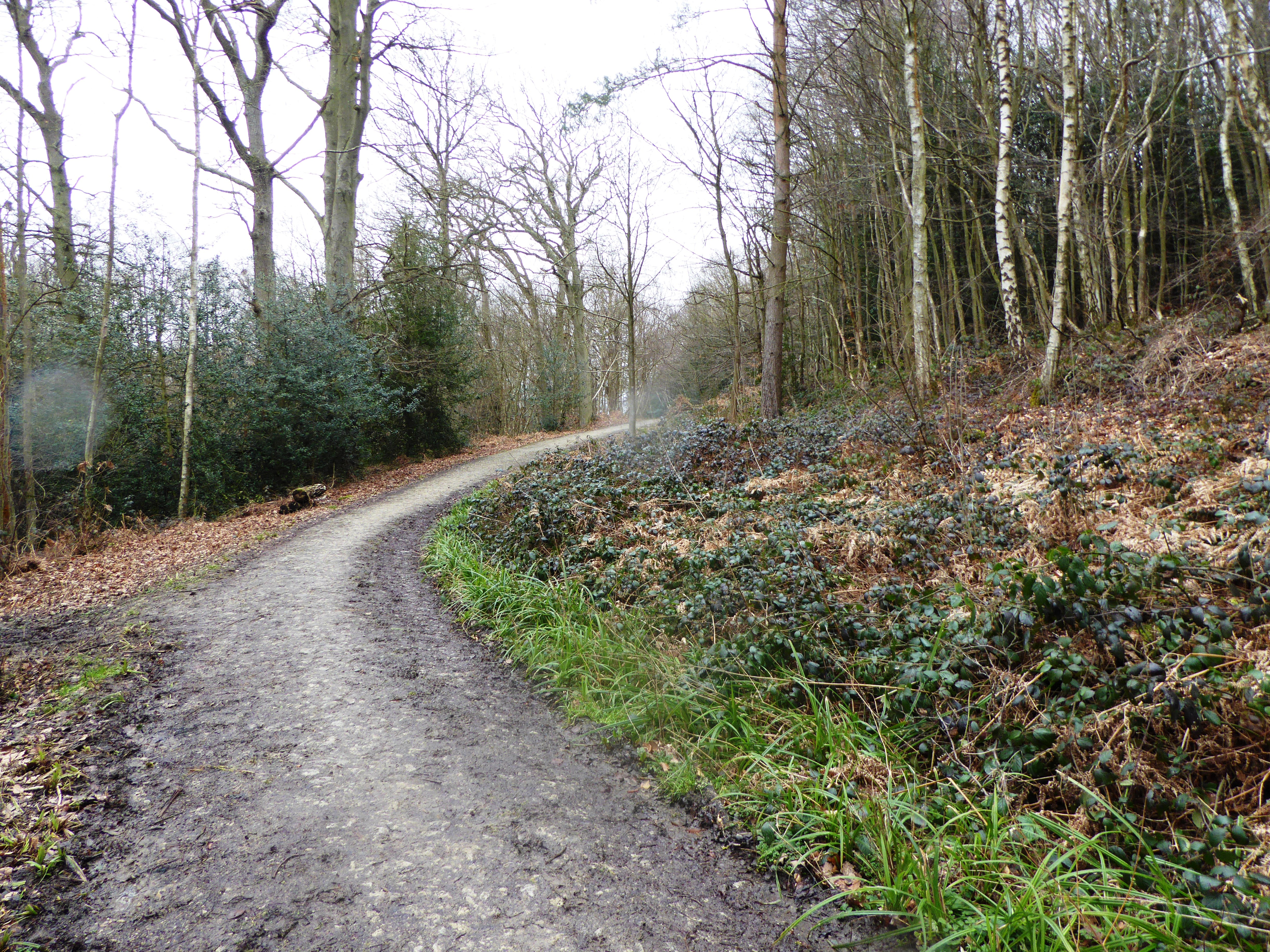
- Interactive map of Brenchley Wood
- Type: Nature reserve
- Location: Matfield, Kent
- OS grid: TQ 648 420
- Area: 15 hectares (37 acres)
- Manager: Kent Wildlife Trust

Brenchley Wood is a 15-hectare (37-acre) nature reserve south of Paddock Wood in Kent. It is managed by the Kent Wildlife Trust, and it is part of the High Weald Area of Outstanding Natural Beauty.

This ancient wood is dominated by mature beech and oak trees, with birds such as nightingales and tawny owls. A former pine plantation in the north of the site is now being restored to heathland.

There is access at the junction of Romford Road and Foxhole Lane.
