= Broadham Down =

Nature reserve in Kent, England

Coordinates: 51.245°N 0.986°E

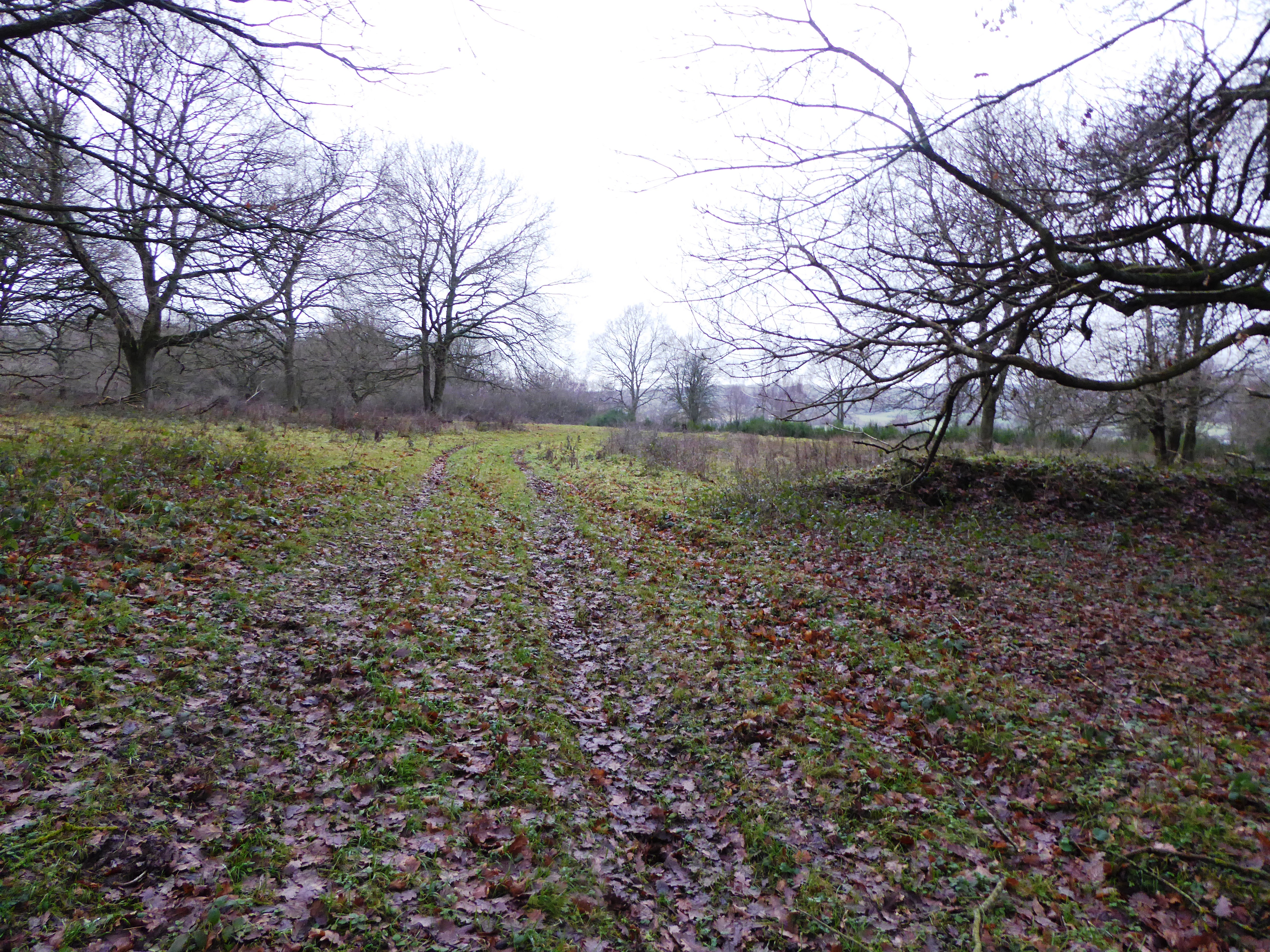
- Interactive map of Broadham Down
- Type: Nature reserve
- Location: Chilham, Kent
- OS grid: TR 085538
- Area: 16 hectares (40 acres)
- Manager: Kent Wildlife Trust

Broadham Down is a 16-hectare (40-acre) nature reserve east of Chilham and west of Canterbury in Kent. It is managed by the Kent Wildlife Trust.

This nature reserve has views over the Stour Valley. Three species of bat hibernate on the site, which has chalk grassland, woodland and scrub. Flowering plants include fragrant and common spotted orchids.

There is access to the site by a track from Mystole Lane.
