= The Gill =

Nature reserve in England

Coordinates: 51.12°N 0.468°E

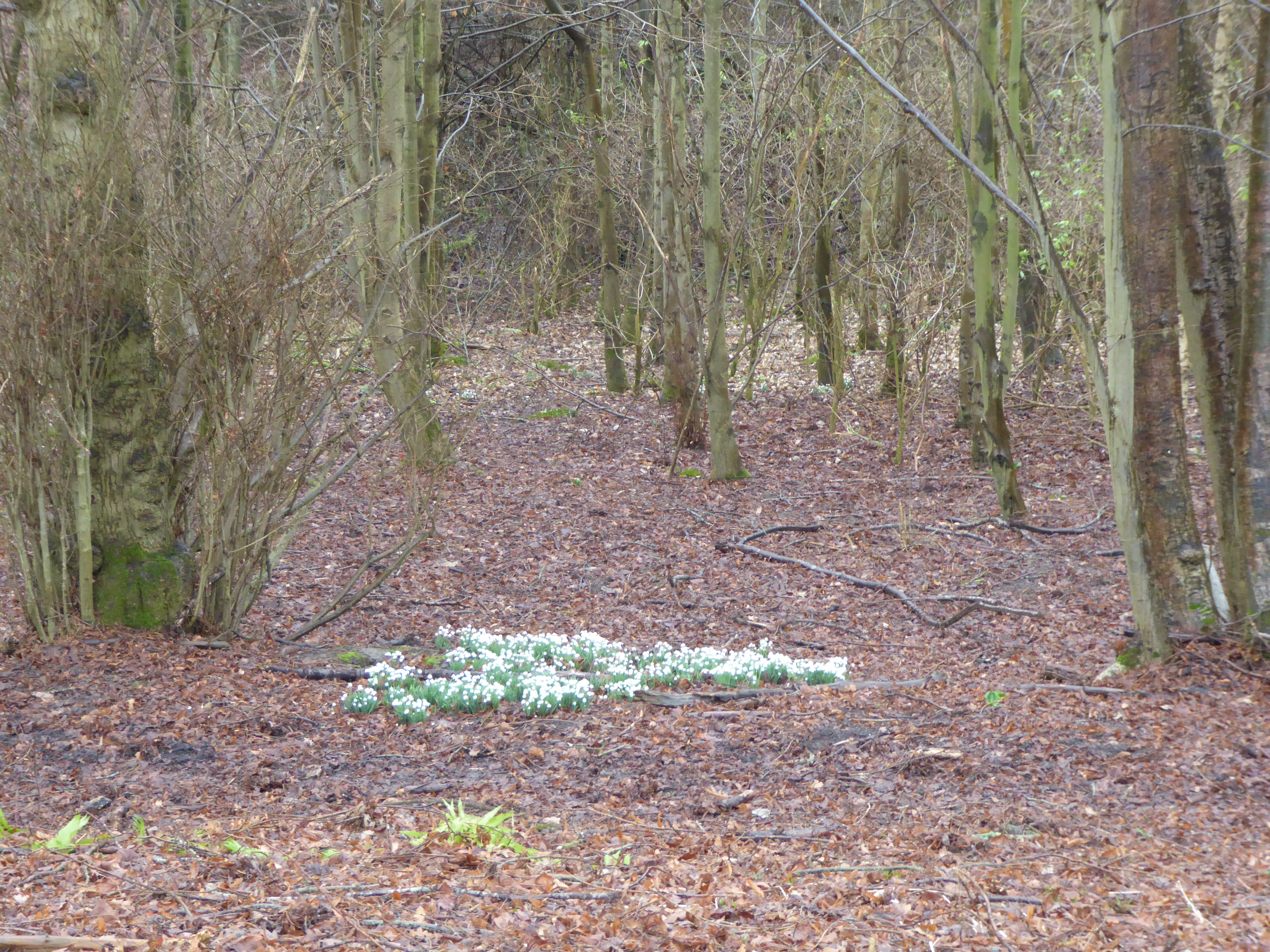
- Interactive map of The Gill
- Type: Nature reserve
- Location: Goudhurst, Kent
- Area: 12 hectares (30 acres)
- Manager: Kent Wildlife Trust

The Gill is a 12-hectare (30-acre) nature reserve north of Goudhurst in Kent, England. It is managed by the Kent Wildlife Trust.

This site has been planted with sweet chestnut, which dominates most of it. Flora includes bluebells, early purple orchids, and marsh-marigold.

Public access is via prior arrangement.
