= Darland Banks =

Nature reserve in Kent, England

Coordinates: 51.362°N 0.565°E

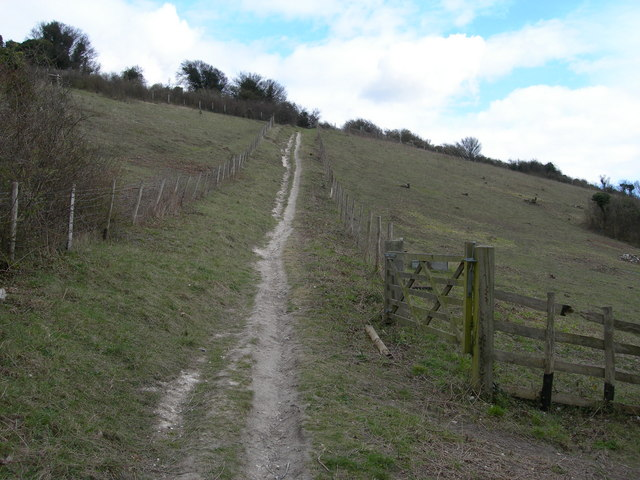
- Interactive map of Darland Banks
- Type: Local Nature Reserve
- Location: Gillingham, Kent
- OS grid: TQ 787 657
- Area: 29.1 hectares (72 acres)
- Manager: Kent Wildlife Trust

Darland Banks is a 29.1-hectare (72-acre) Local Nature Reserve on the southern outskirts of Gillingham in Kent. It is owned by Medway Council and managed by Kent Wildlife Trust.

This area of grassland, scrub and woodland has diverse fauna and flora, including the largest population of man orchids in Britain. There are birds such as willow warbler, yellowhammer, linnet and lesser whitethroat.

There is access from Darland Avenue.
