= Hewitt's Chalk Bank =

Coordinates: 51.346°N 0.124°E

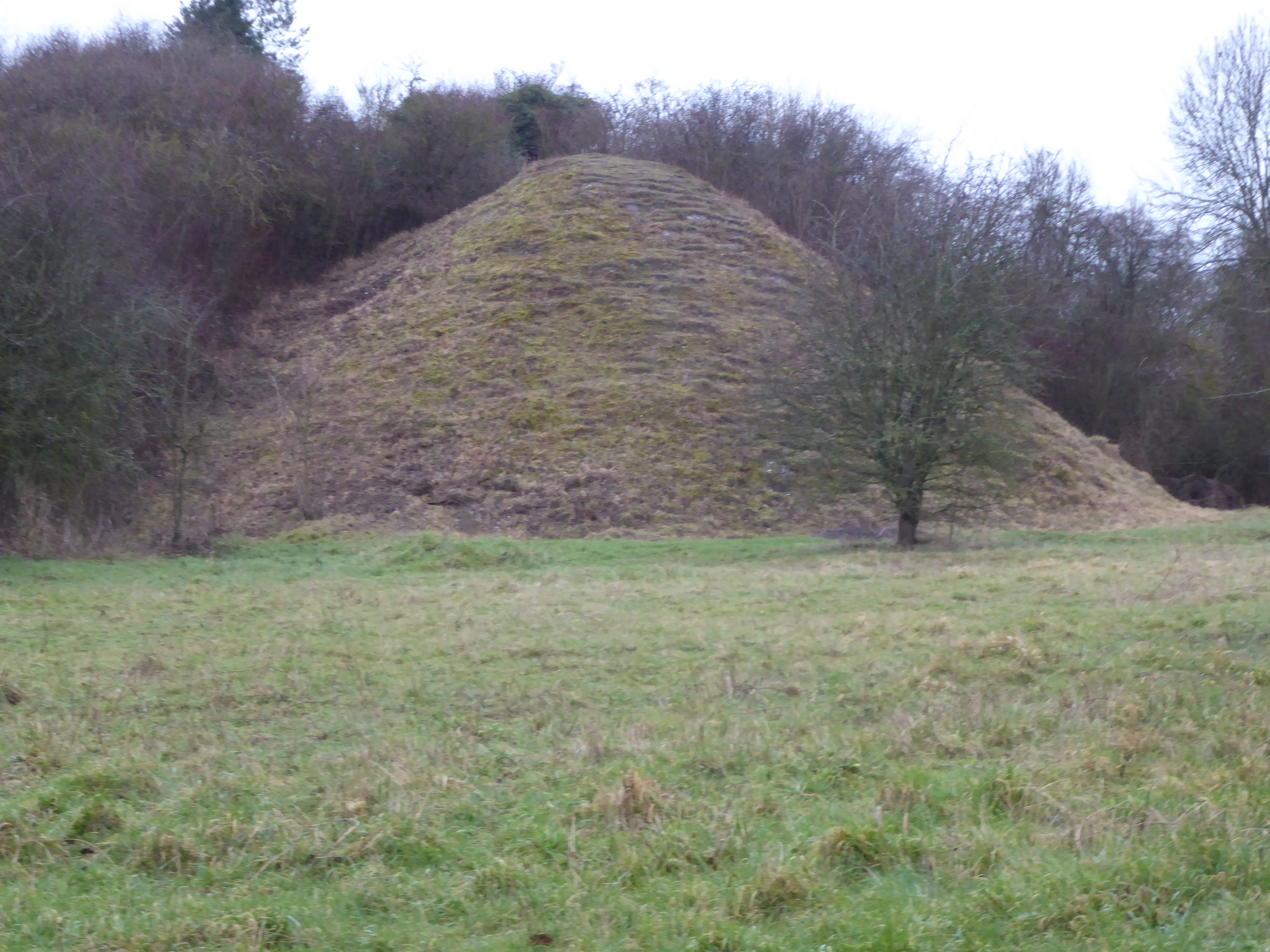
- Interactive map of Hewitt's Chalk Bank
- Type: Nature reserve
- Location: Pratt's Bottom, London Borough of Bromley
- OS grid: TQ 480 629
- Area: 4 hectares (9.9 acres)
- Manager: Kent Wildlife Trust

Hewitt's Chalk Bank is a 4-hectare (10-acre) nature reserve north-east of Pratt's Bottom in the London Borough of Bromley. It is managed by the Kent Wildlife Trust.

This former refuse tip has a large mound which is the soil from the excavation of a railway tunnel. Habitats are grassland and scrub, and unusual flora include grass vetchling and dark mullein.

Access is available via a track on the north side of the A21, opposite Sevenoaks Road, though the gate to the site is padlocked.
