= Stone Wood =

Nature reserve in Kent, England

Coordinates: 51.099°N 0.803°E

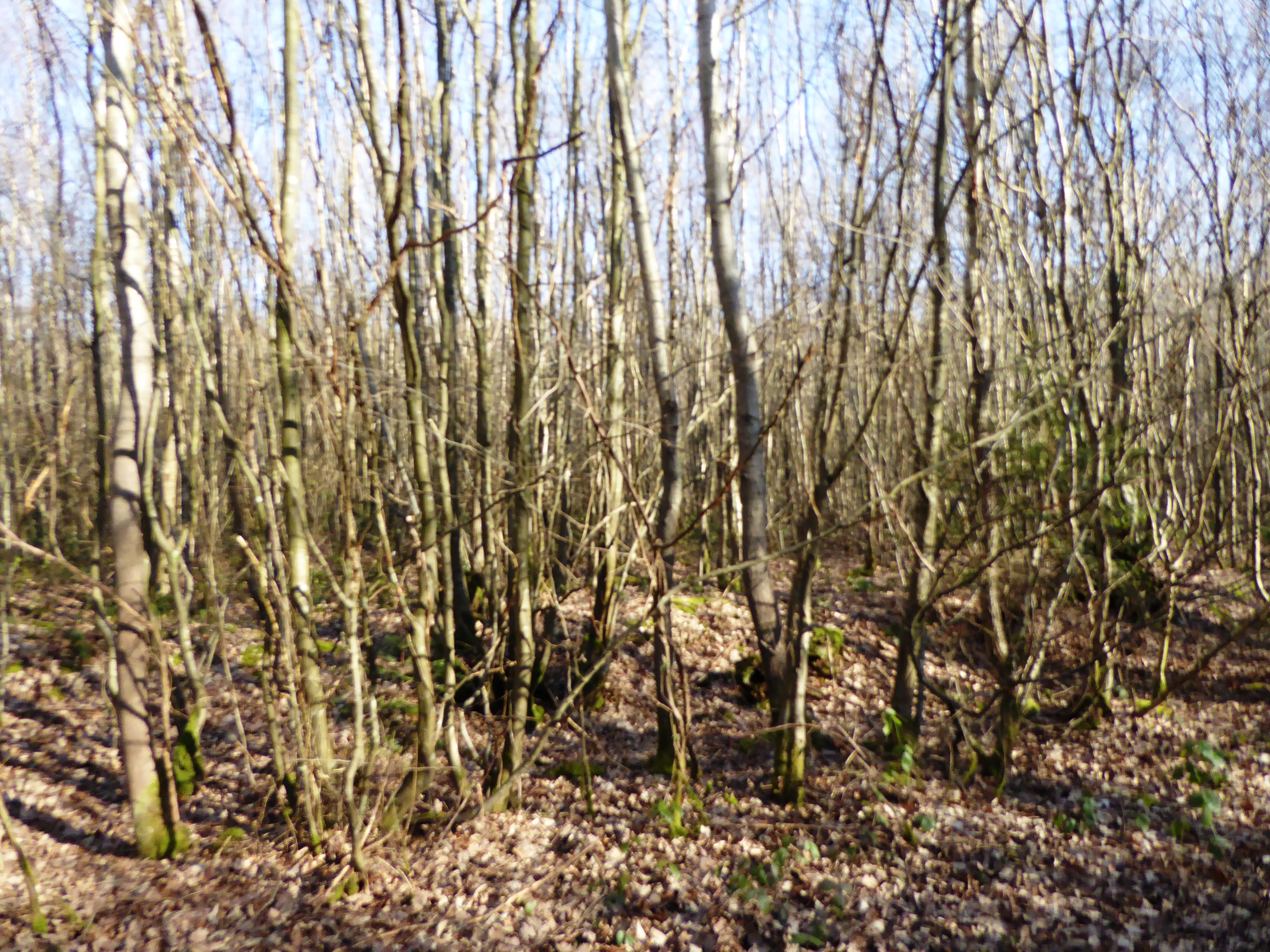
- Interactive map of Stone Wood
- Type: Nature reserve
- Location: Shadoxhurst, Kent
- OS grid: TQ 964 370
- Area: Not available
- Manager: Kent Wildlife Trust

Stone Wood is a nature reserve south-west of Shadoxhurst in Kent. It is managed by Kent Wildlife Trust (KWT).

This site was clear felled in 1992 and left to regenerate naturally. The KWT acquired it in 2002 and is encouraging native plants and animals to occupy it.

There is access from a public footpath which runs along the western side, but there are no footpaths in the site.
