= South Blean =

Nature reserve in Kent, England

Coordinates: 51.275°N 0.999°E

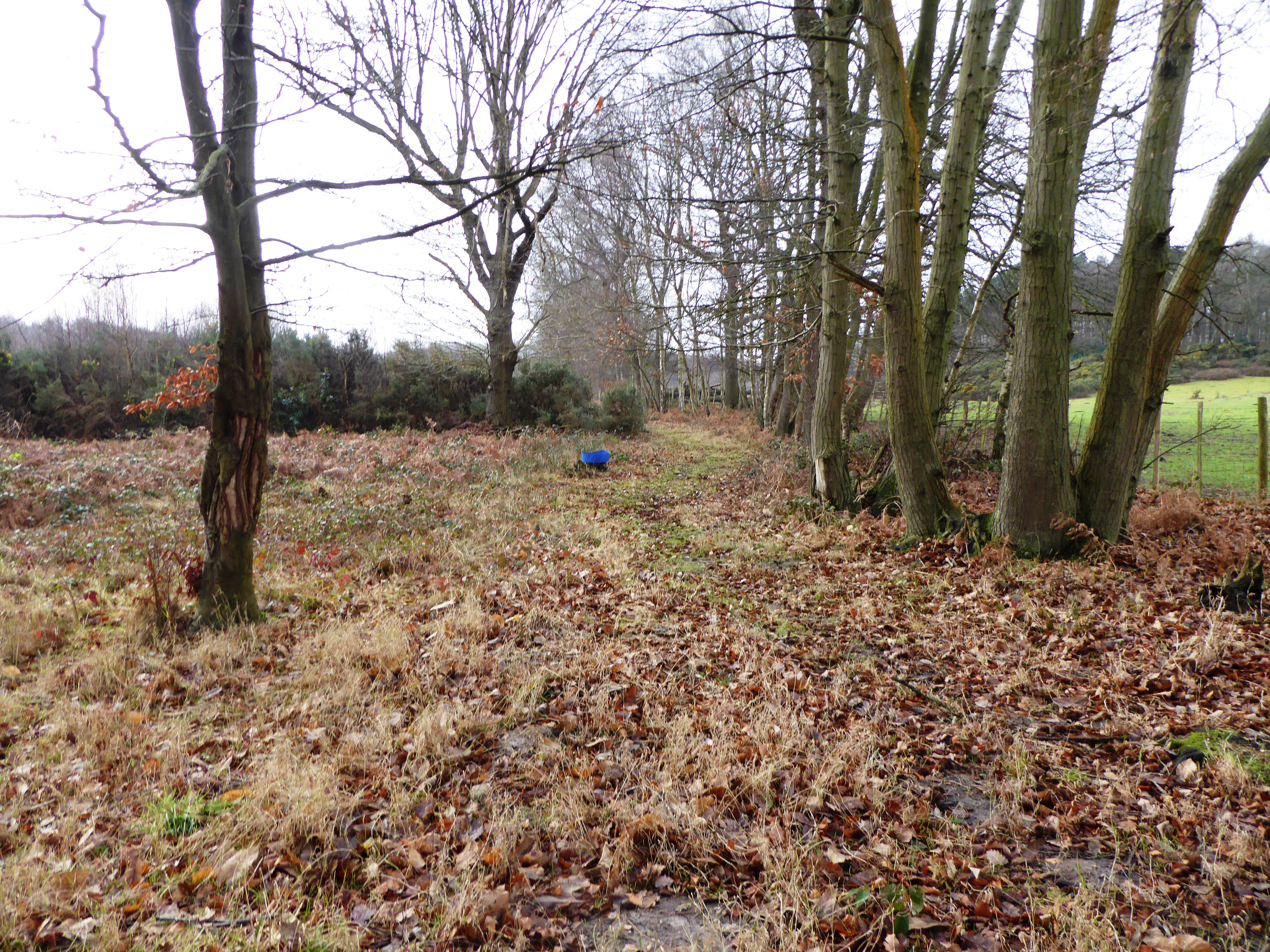
- Interactive map of South Blean
- Type: Nature reserve
- Location: Chartham Hatch, Kent
- OS grid: TR 093571
- Area: 329 hectares (810 acres)
- Manager: Kent Wildlife Trust

South Blean is a 329-hectare (810-acre) nature reserve near Chartham Hatch, west of Canterbury in Kent. It is owned and managed by the Kent Wildlife Trust.

This site has native woodland, conifer plantations, heath, and bog. KWT is gradually removing the conifers to allow natural regeneration, and it also manages the site by grazing and coppicing. Birds include nightjars and nightingales.

There is access from the track called Primrose Hill.
