= Kemsing Down =

Nature reserve in Kent, England

Coordinates: 51.313°N 0.223°E

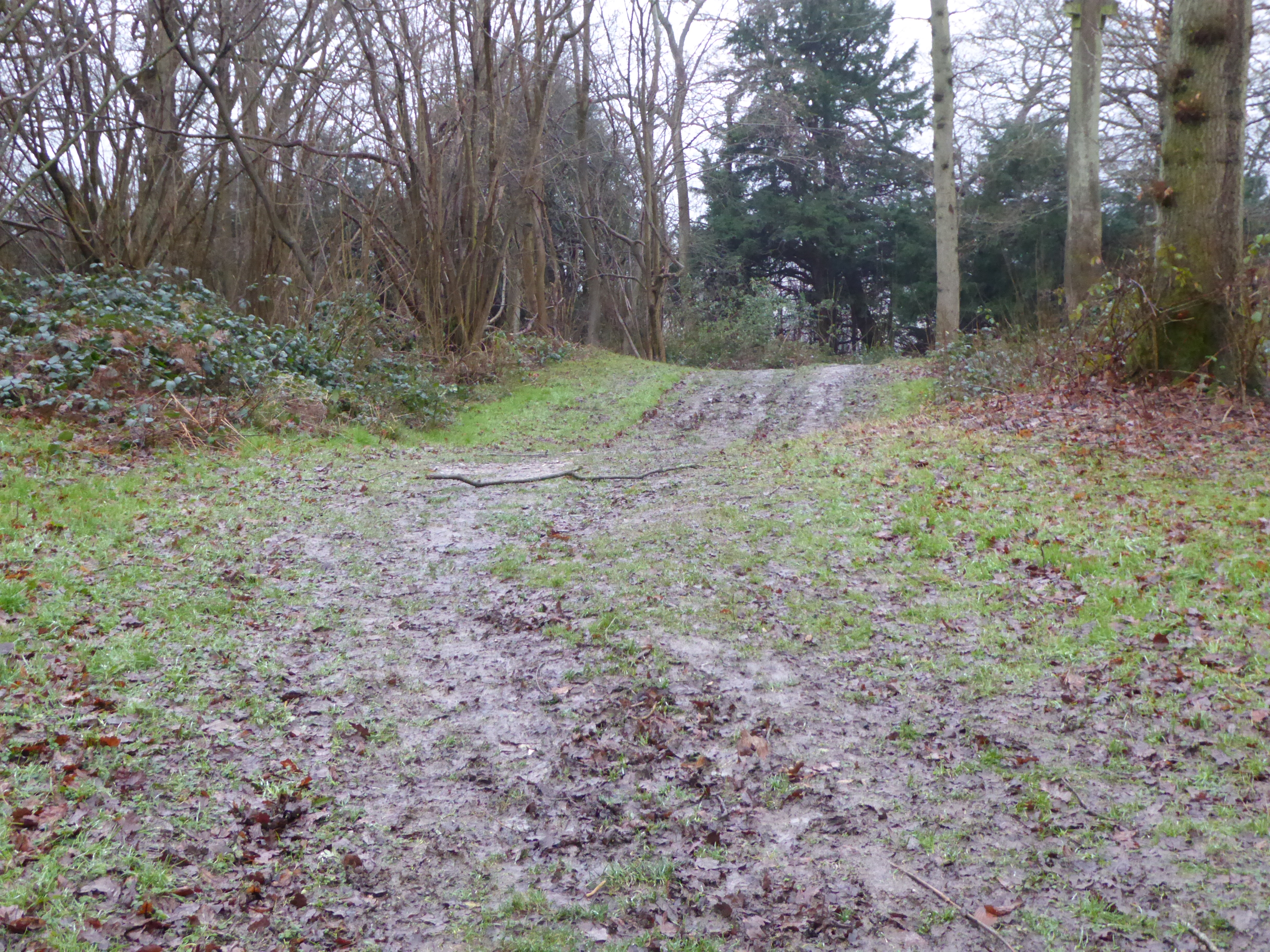
- Interactive map of Kemsing Down
- Type: Nature reserve
- Location: Sevenoaks, Kent
- OS grid: TQ 550 594
- Area: 16 hectares (40 acres)
- Manager: Kent Wildlife Trust

Kemsing Down is a 16-hectare (40-acre) nature reserve north of Sevenoaks in Kent. It is managed by the Kent Wildlife Trust. It is in the Kent Downs Area of Outstanding Natural Beauty.

Habitats in this downland site include ancient and secondary woodland, scrub and chalk grassland. There are man, pyramidal and common spotted orchids, and butterflies include the brown argus and grizzled skipper.

There is access by a footpath from Pilgrims Way.
