= Polhill Bank =

Nature reserve in England

Coordinates: 51.324°N 0.166°E

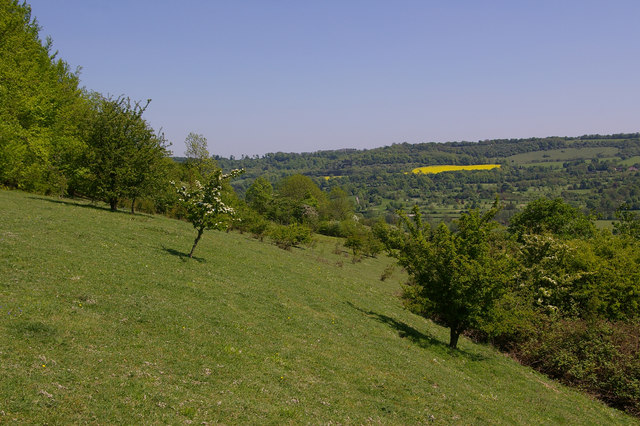
- Interactive map of Polhill Bank
- Type: Nature reserve
- Location: Shoreham, Kent
- OS grid: TQ510605
- Area: 4 hectares (9.9 acres)
- Manager: Kent Wildlife Trust

Polhill Bank is a 4-hectare (9.9-acre) nature reserve south of Shoreham, which is north of Sevenoaks in Kent. It is managed by Kent Wildlife Trust. It is in Kent Downs Area of Outstanding Natural Beauty.

This chalk grassland site is on a south-east slope. There is also an area of scrub, which provides a habitat for birds such as blackcap and willow warbler. Flora include rock-rose.

The site is open to the public.
