= Kiln Wood =

Nature reserve in Kent, England

Coordinates: 51.232°N 0.700°E

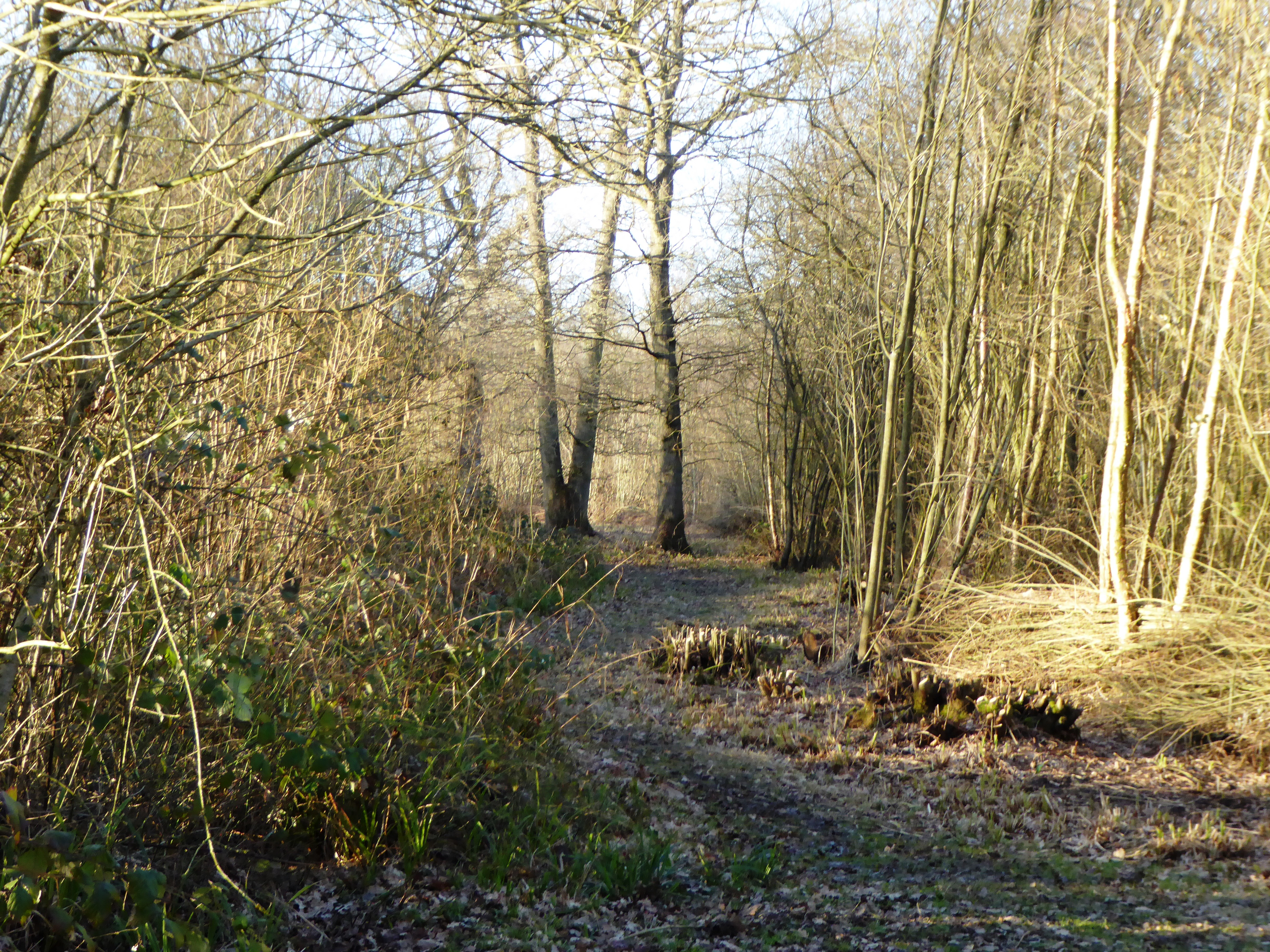
- Interactive map of Kiln Wood
- Type: Nature reserve
- Location: Lenham, Kent
- OS grid: TQ 886 515
- Area: 6 hectares (15 acres)
- Manager: Kent Wildlife Trust

Kiln Wood is a 6-hectare (15-acre) nature reserve south of Lenham in Kent. It is managed by Kent Wildlife Trust.

This wood is mainly oak, hornbeam and hazel, and it is managed by coppicing. A stream at the northern end has lady fern, herb paris and broad buckler-fern.

There is access from Headcorn Road.
