= The Larches, Kent =

Nature reserve in Kent, England

Coordinates: 51.299°N 0.562°E

The Larches
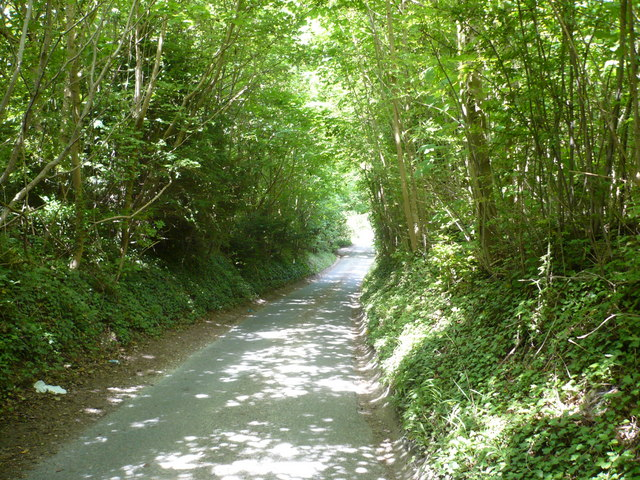
- Interactive map of The Larches
- Type: Nature reserve
- Location: Detling, Kent
- OS grid: TQ787587
- Area: 25 hectares (62 acres)
- Manager: Kent Wildlife Trust

The Larches is a 25-hectare (62-acre) nature reserve north of Detling, which is north of Maidstone in Kent. It is managed by Kent Wildlife Trust. It is part of the Wouldham to Detling Escarpment Site of Special Scientific Interest and Nature Conservation Review site, Grade I It is also part of the North Downs Woodlands Special Area of Conservation, and Kent Downs Area of Outstanding Natural Beauty.

This site has chalk grassland, woods and scrub. Grassland flora include autumn gentian, pyramidal orchid and broad-leaved helleborine, and there are butterflies such as the chalkhill blue and marbled white.

There is public access to the site.
