= Wattle Wood =

Nature reserve in Kent, England

Coordinates: 51.087°N 0.673°E

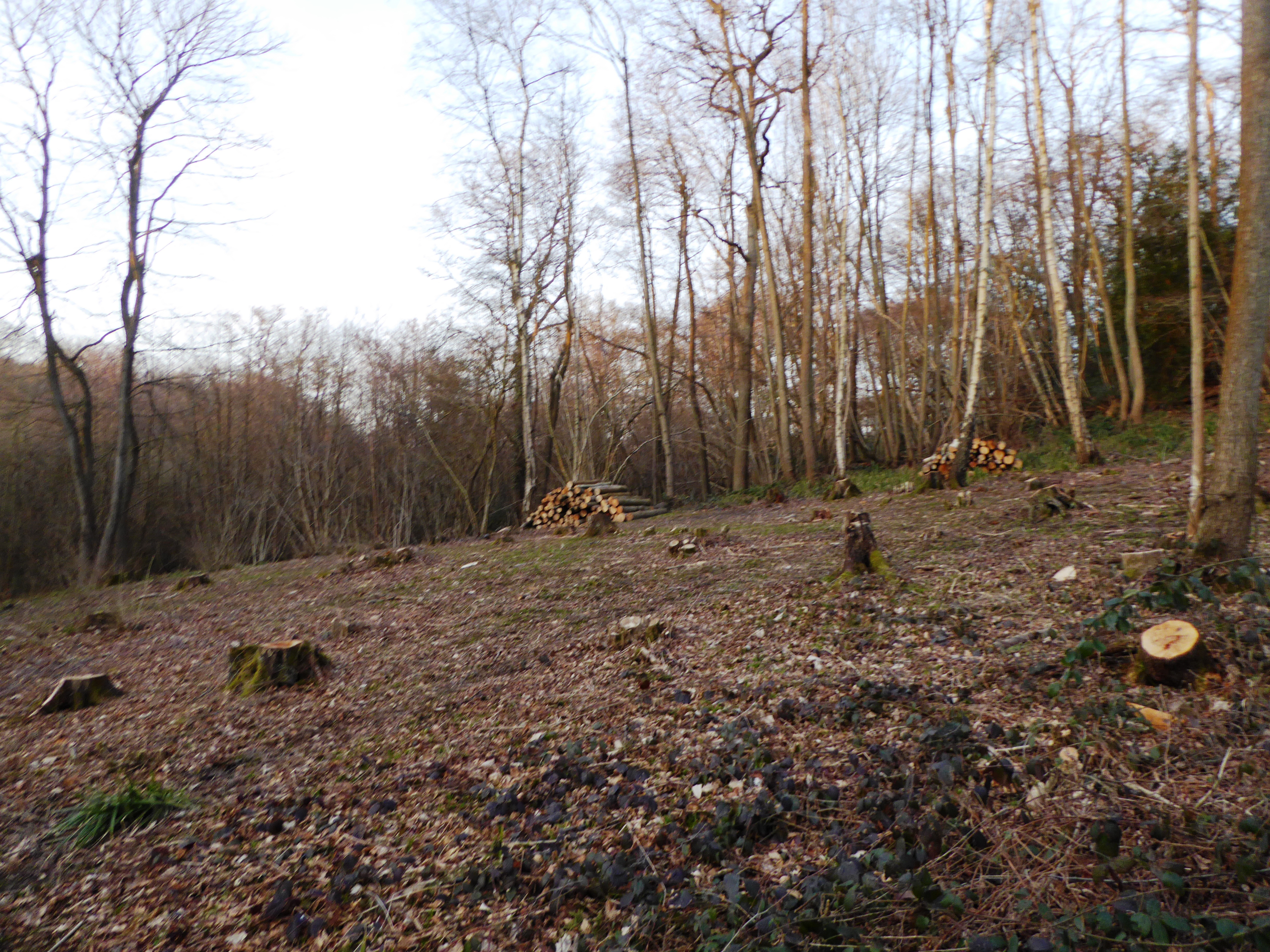
- Interactive map of Wattle Wood
- Type: Nature reserve
- Location: Tenterden, Kent
- OS grid: TQ 873 354
- Area: 1 hectare (2.5 acres)
- Manager: Kent Wildlife Trust

Wattle Wood is a 1-hectare (2.5-acre) nature reserve north-west of Tenterden in Kent. It is managed by Kent Wildlife Trust.

This ancient coppice with standards wood has diverse flora and fauna. Flowers include early purple orchids, and there are mammals such as dormice.
