= Spuckles and Kennelling Woods =

Nature reserve in Kent, England

Coordinates: 51.238°N 0.802°E

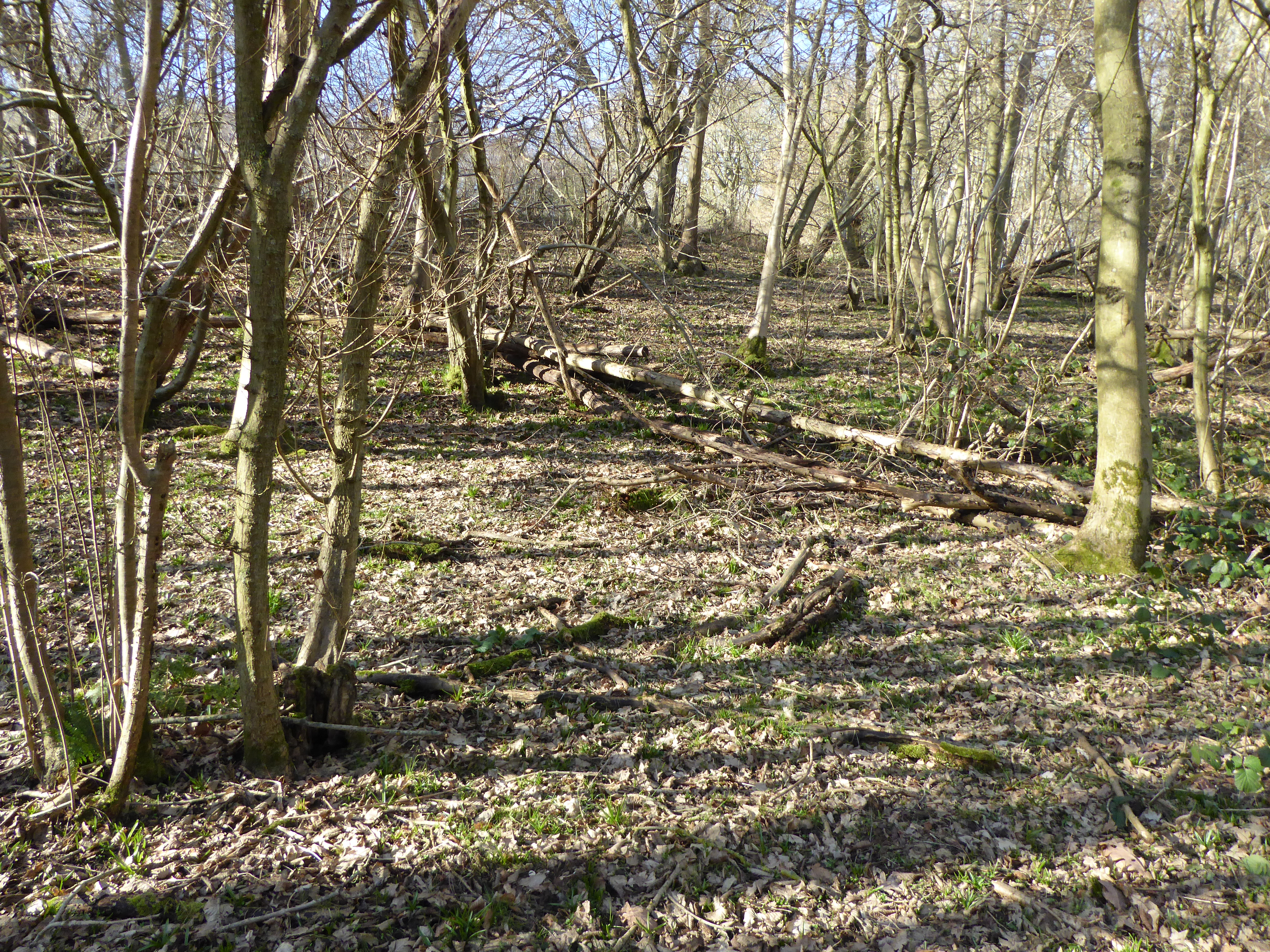
- Spuckles Wood
- Interactive map of Spuckles and Kennelling Woods
- Type: Nature reserve
- Location: Charing, Kent
- OS grid: TQ 957 525
- Area: 20 hectares (49 acres)
- Manager: Kent Wildlife Trust

Spuckles and Kennelling Woods is a 20-hectare (49-acre) nature reserve north of Charing in Kent. It is managed by Kent Wildlife Trust. It is in the Kent Downs Area of Outstanding Natural Beauty.

These ancient woods on the steep escarpment of the Kent Downs have diverse trees including mature oaks and beeches. Flora include greater butterfly and lady orchids.

There is access by a footpath from Thorneycroft Road.
