= Ashford Warren and Hoads Wood =

Nature reserve in Kent, England

Coordinates: 51.160°N 0.862°E

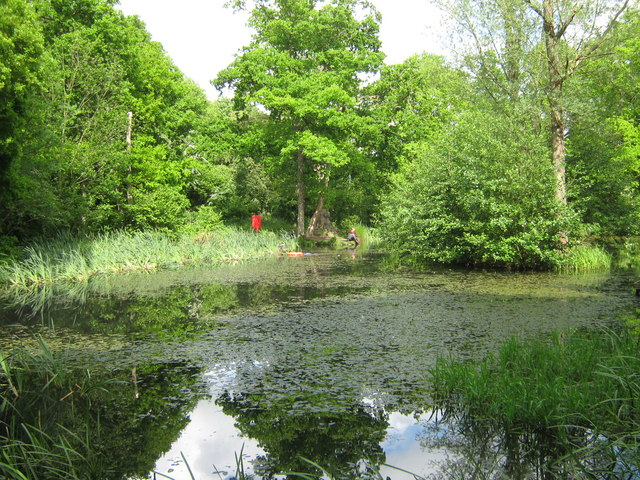
- Interactive map of Ashford Warren and Hoads Wood
- Type: Nature reserve
- Location: Ashford, Kent
- OS grid: TR002439
- Area: 34.5 hectares (85 acres)
- Manager: Kent Wildlife Trust

Ashford Warren and Hoads Wood is a 34.5-hectare (85-acre) nature reserve north of Ashford in Kent. It is owned by Ashford Borough Council and managed by Kent Wildlife Trust.

This site has acid grassland, which is nationally rare, and mature woodland. There are also pools which have water violets, great crested newts and grass snakes.

There is access from Warren Lane.
