= Cromers Wood =

Nature reserve in Kent, England

Coordinates: 51.311°N 0.733°E

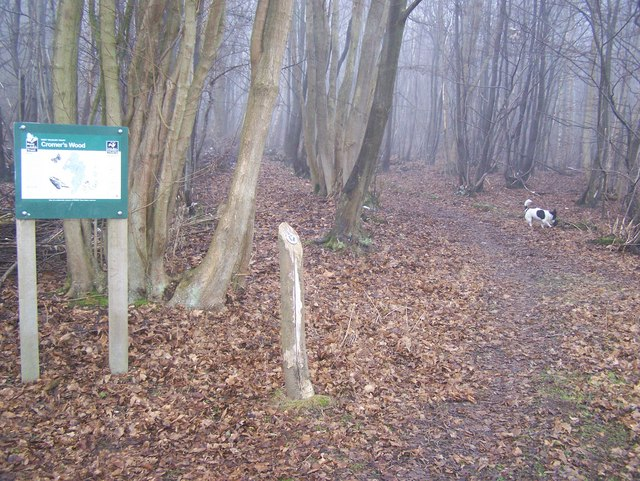
- Interactive map of Cromers Wood
- Type: Nature reserve
- Location: Milstead, Kent
- OS grid: TQ 906 604
- Area: 28 hectares (69 acres)
- Manager: Kent Wildlife Trust

Cromers Wood is a 28-hectare (69-acre) nature reserve between Milstead and Sittingbourne in Kent. It is managed by Kent Wildlife Trust.

This ancient semi-natural wood is located on the south-east slope of a dry valley. There are birds such as sparrowhawks, green woodpeckers and great spotted woodpeckers, and flora include early purple and common spotted orchids.

There is public access to the site.
