= Parsonage Wood =

Woodland in Kent, England

Coordinates: 51.066°N 0.563°E

- Site of Special Scientific Interest
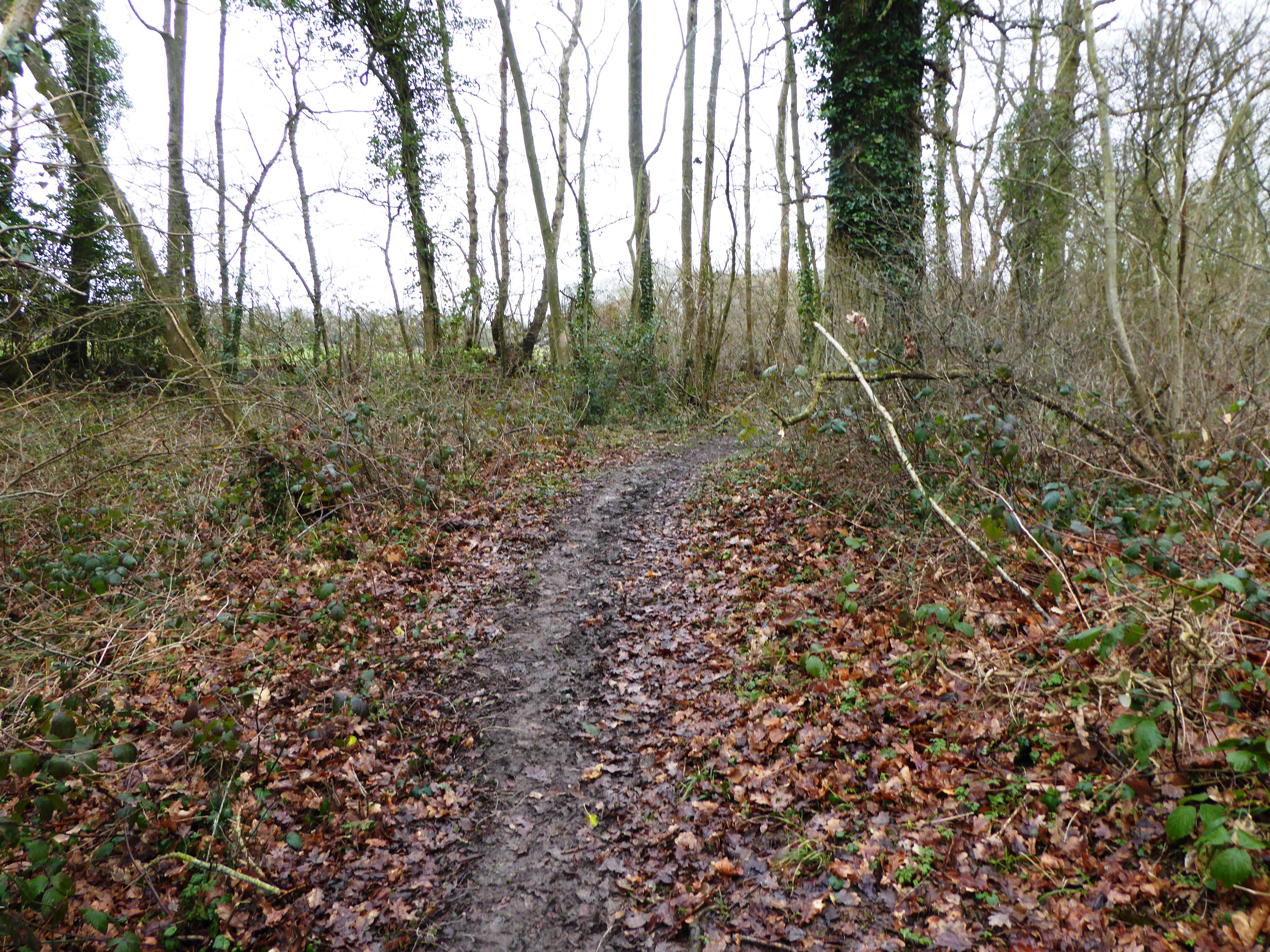
- Location of Parsonage Wood.
- Area of search: Kent
- Grid reference: TQ 797 328
- Interest: Biological
- Area: 9.7 hectares (24 acres)
- Notification date: 1985
- Location map: Magic Map

Parsonage Wood is a 9.7-hectare (24-acre) biological Site of Special Scientific Interest south-east of Cranbrook in Kent. It is owned and managed by the Kent Wildlife Trust.

This is an example of a woodland ghyll in the High Weald. The trees are mainly coppiced, but some of the ground flora are species which are indicative of ancient woods, such as butcher's broom, violet helleborine and pendulous sedge.

There is access from a footpath which runs north from Scullsgate House.
