= Wouldham to Detling Escarpment =

Protected area in Kent, England

Coordinates: 51.322°N 0.514°E

- Site of Special Scientific Interest
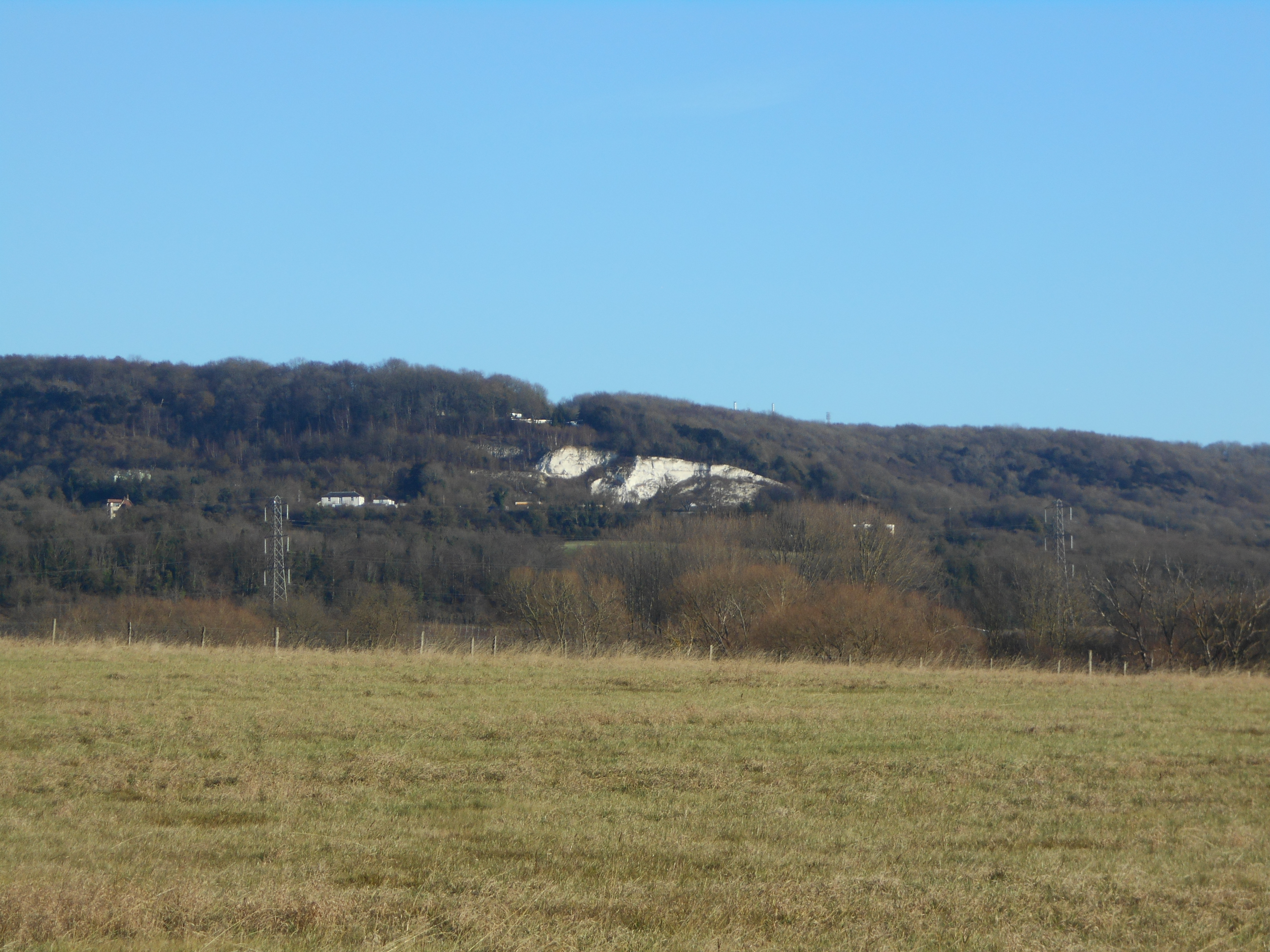
- Blue Bell Hill
- Location of Wouldham to Detling Escarpment.
- Area of search: Kent
- Grid reference: TQ 753 611
- Interest: Biological; Geological
- Area: 311.2 hectares (769 acres)
- Notification date: 1990
- Location map: Magic Map

Wouldham to Detling Escarpment is a 311.2-hectare (769-acre) biological and geological Site of Special Scientific Interest which stretches from Wouldham to Detling, north of Maidstone in Kent. Part of it is a Geological Conservation Review site, and it is part of the North Downs Woodlands Special Area of Conservation and the Kent Downs Area of Outstanding Natural Beauty. It is a Nature Conservation Review site, Grade I and it includes three Kent Wildlife Trust nature reserves and a Local Nature Reserve,

This stretch of chalk escarpment has woodland, unimproved grassland and scrub. Plants include the nationally rare meadow clary and there are several scarce invertebrates. There are many Mesozoic fossil fishes in an excellent state of preservation.
