= Sandwich Bay to Hacklinge Marshes =

Protected area in Kent, England

Coordinates: 51.283°N 1.371°E

- Site of Special Scientific Interest
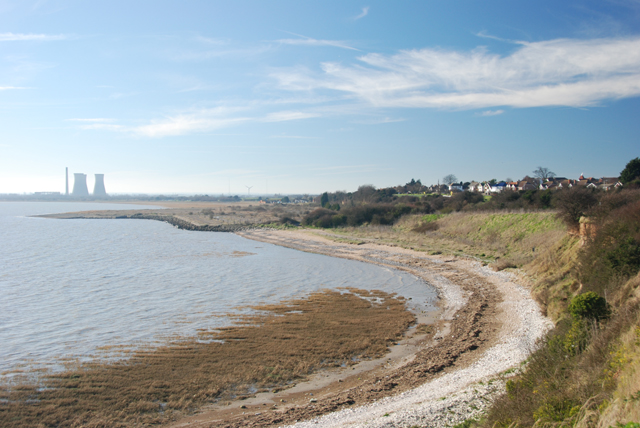
- Pegwell Bay
- Location of Sandwich Bay to Hacklinge Marshes.
- Area of search: Kent
- Grid reference: TR 352 592
- Interest: Biological; Geological
- Area: 1,790.1 hectares (4,423 acres)
- Notification date: 1993
- Location map: Magic Map

Sandwich Bay to Hacklinge Marshes is a 1,790.1-hectare (4,423-acre) biological and geological Site of Special Scientific Interest which stretches between Deal and Sandwich in Kent. It includes two Geological Conservation Review sites, and most of it is a Nature Conservation Review site, Grade I. Part of it is a Ramsar site, a Special Area of Conservation, a Special Protection Area and a National Nature Reserve, It also includes a Kent Wildlife Trust nature reserve and a Local Nature Reserve,

This site has over 30 plant species and 168 invertebrates which are nationally rare and nationally scarce, and several wintering birds are present in nationally important numbers. It is also a geologically important site, with diverse fish fossils dating to the Thanetian around 57 million years ago.
