= Yockletts Bank =

Protected area in Kent, England

Coordinates: 51.188°N 1.040°E

- Site of Special Scientific Interest
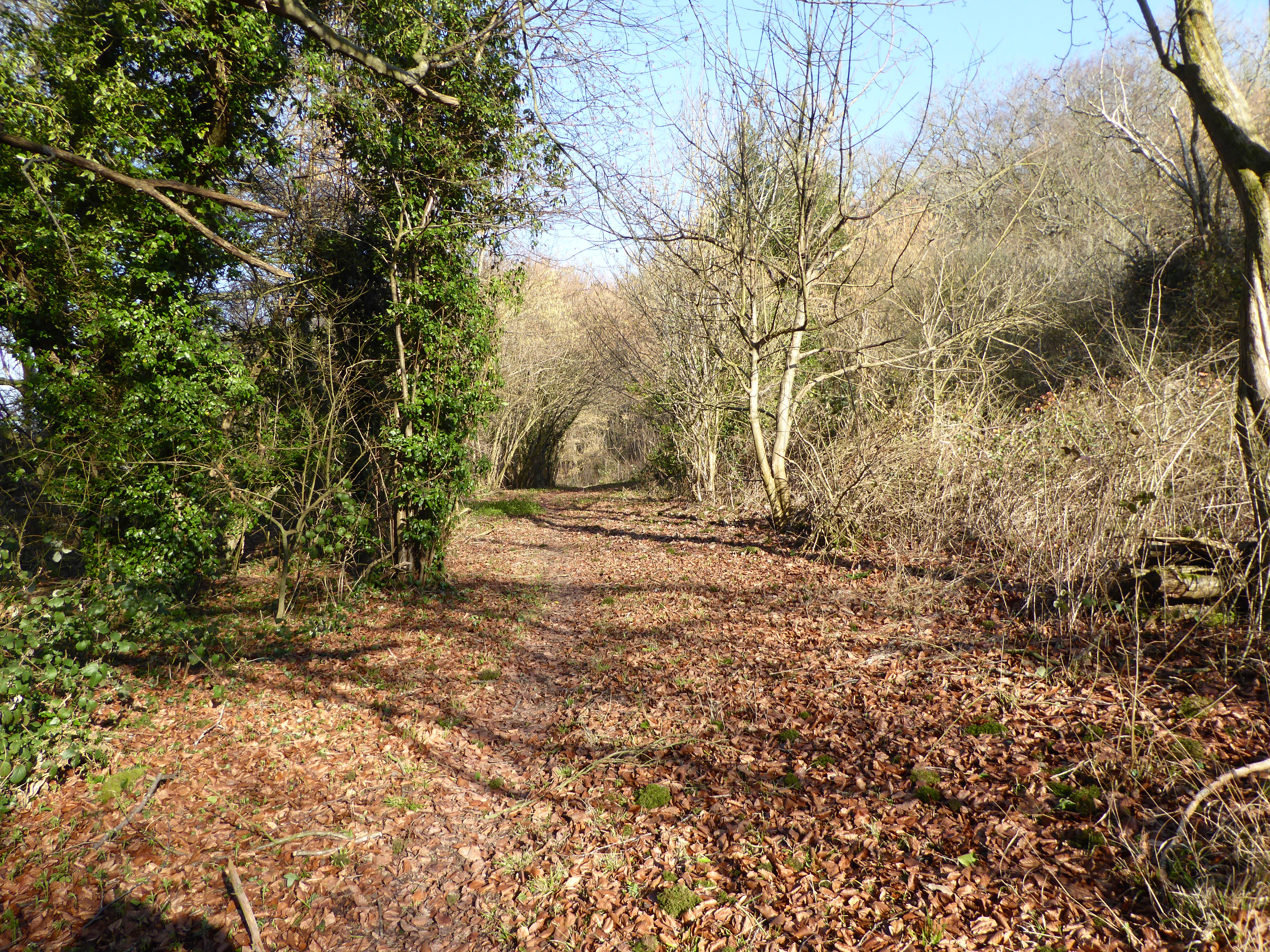
- Location of Yockletts Bank.
- Area of search: Kent
- Grid reference: TR 125 476
- Interest: Biological
- Area: 25.4 hectares (63 acres)
- Notification date: 1985
- Location map: Magic Map

Yockletts Bank is a 25.4-hectare (63-acre) biological Site of Special Scientific Interest west of Stelling Minnis in Kent. It is managed by KWT and is part of Kent Downs Area of Outstanding Natural Beauty.

This sloping site has woodland on dry chalk soils. There are diverse woodland breeding birds, and the ground flora is dominated by bluebells, but there are also many orchids.

There is access from the road called Gogway, which runs through the site.
