= Kent Wildlife Trust =

Conservation charity in the UK

- Formation: 1958
- Type: Conservation charity
- Headquarters: Tyland Barn, Chatham Road, Sandling, Maidstone, Kent
- Website: www.kentwildlifetrust.org.uk

Kent Wildlife Trust (KWT) is a conservation charity in the United Kingdom that was founded in 1958, previously known as the Kent Trust for Nature Conservation. It aims to "work with people to restore, save and improve our natural spaces" and to "ensure that 30% of Kent and Medway – land and sea – is managed to create a healthy place for wildlife to flourish". In 2023, they have reported over 30,000 members and an annual income of £8 million. KWT manages over ninety nature reserves in Kent, of which thirty-seven are Sites of Special Scientific Interest, three are national nature reserves, five are Special Areas of Conservation, four are Special Protection Areas, six are local nature reserves, thirty-eight are in Areas of Outstanding Natural Beauty and one is a scheduled monument.

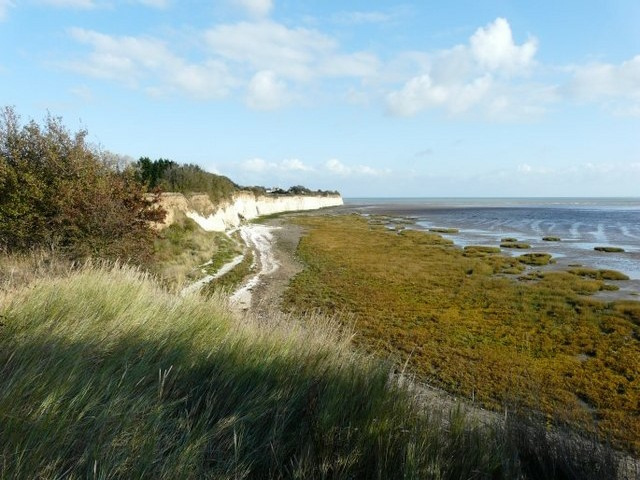
Pegwell Bay, which is part of Sandwich and Pegwell Bay nature reserve, may have been the site of Julius Caesar's landing in Britain in 54 BC.

Kent is a county in the southeastern corner of England. It is bounded to the north by Greater London and the Thames Estuary, to the west by Sussex and Surrey, and to the south and east by the English Channel and the North Sea. The county town is Maidstone. It is governed by Kent County Council, with twelve district councils: Ashford, Canterbury, Dartford, Dover, Folkestone and Hythe, Gravesham, Maidstone, Thanet, Tonbridge and Malling and Tunbridge Wells. Medway is geographically part of Kent but is a separate unitary authority. The chalk hills of the North Downs run from east to west through the county, with the wooded Weald to the south. The coastline is alternately flat and cliff-lined.

== Nature reserves ==
=== Key ===
==== Public access ====
- FP = Access to footpaths only
- NO = No public access to the site
- YES = Free public access to all or most of the site
- PP = Public access to part of the site

==== Classifications ====
- AONB = Area of Outstanding Natural Beauty
- GCR = Geological Conservation Review site
- LNR = Local nature reserve
- NCR = Nature Conservation Review site
- NNR = National nature reserve
- Ramsar = Ramsar site, an internationally important wetland site
- SAC = Special Area of Conservation
- SM = Scheduled monument
- SPA = Special Protection Area
- SSSI = Site of Special Scientific Interest

== Sites ==
Site	Photograph	Area (Note: The area and location are taken from the Wildlife Trust page for each site.)	Location	Public access	Classifications	Description
Ashford Warren and Hoads Wood	Ashford Warren	34.5 hectares (85 acres)	Ashford; 51.160°N 0.862°E; TR002439	YES		This site has acid grassland, which is nationally rare, and mature woodland. There are also pools which have water violets, great crested newts and grass snakes.
Bigbury Camp	Bigbury Camp	Not available	Canterbury; 51.279°N 1.034°E; TR117577	YES	SM	This Iron Age hillfort may have been the site of a battle when Julius Caesar invaded Britain in 55 BC. It is now part of Howfield Wood.
Blue Bell Hill	Blue Bell Hill	5 hectares (12 acres)	Chatham; 51.331°N 0.501°E; TQ743621	YES	AONB, NCR, SSSI	This hill has typical chalk grassland flora such as salad burnet, bird's foot trefoil and fairy flax. Butterflies include the chalk hill blue and brown argus.
Brenchley Wood	Brenchley Wood	15 hectares (37 acres)	Tonbridge; 51.154°N 0.355°E; TQ648420	YES		This ancient wood is dominated by mature beech and oak trees. A former pine plantation in the north of the site is now being restored to heathland.
Broadham Down	Broadham Down	16 hectares (40 acres)	Canterbury; 51.245°N 0.986°E; TR085538	YES		This nature reserve has views over the Stour Valley. Three species of bat hibernate on the site, which has chalk grassland, woodland and scrub. Flowering plants include fragrant and common spotted orchids.
Burham Down	Burham Down	110 hectares (270 acres)	Rochester; 51.334°N 0.489°E; TQ735624	PP	AONB, NCR, SAC, SSSI	This site has woodland, chalk grassland, and two chalk pits which provide shelter for birds in the winter and breeding sites in the summer. Woodland flora include orchids.
Burham Marsh	Burham Marsh	36 hectares (89 acres)	Rochester; 51.327°N 0.459°E; TQ714615	FP	SSSI	These tidal reedbeds on the River Medway provide habitats for waterfowl and waders such as kingfishers, cormorants, herons and geese.
Collingwood	Collingwood	3 hectares (7.4 acres)	Cranbrook; 51.035°N 0.509°E; TQ760292	YES		This reserve is woodland which has many exotic species as well as native trees. It is centred on a lake which has water lilies and bulrushes.
Conningbrook Lakes Country Park	Conningbrook Lakes Country Park	34 hectares (84 acres)	Ashford; 51.156°N 0.899°E; TR028436	YES		There are three lakes in these former gravel pits, and other habitats are ponds, a river, grassland and wet woodland. In the winter there are migratory wildfowl and wetland birds such as wigeon, tufted duck and gadwall.
Cowden Pound Pastures	Cowden Pound Pastures	6 hectares (15 acres)	Edenbridge; 51.170°N 0.086°E; TQ459433	NO	SSSI	This small valley has neutral grassland, ancient woodland and marshes. The middle field has one of the largest populations of devil's bit scabious in Kent.
Cromers Wood	Cromers Wood	28 hectares (69 acres)	Sittingbourne; 51.311°N 0.733°E; TQ906604	YES		This ancient semi-natural wood is located on the south-east slope of a dry valley. Most of it is sweet chestnut coppice with oak standards.
Darland Banks	Darland Banks	45 hectares (110 acres)	Gillingham; 51.359°N 0.572°E; TQ792654	YES	LNR	This area of chalk grassland has diverse fauna and flora, including the largest population of man orchids in Britain. There are birds such as willow warbler, yellowhammer, linnet and lesser whitethroat.
Downe Bank	Downe Bank	5 hectares (12 acres)	Orpington; 51.329°N 0.063°E; TQ438609	YES	SSSI	Charles Darwin, who lived locally, carried out scientific research on the chalk grassland site, and it was the first to be purchased by the KWT in 1962.
East Blean Wood	East Blean Wood	122 hectares (300 acres)	Canterbury; 51.335°N 1.148°E; TR194642	YES	NCR, NNR SAC SSSI	This site has mixed coppice with some mature oaks. Insects include the rare and protected heath fritillary butterfly, and there is a wide variety of woodland birds.
Fackenden Down	Fackenden Down	14 hectares (35 acres)	Sevenoaks; 51.323°N 0.196°E; TQ531605	YES	AONB, SSSI	This site is mainly chalk grassland, with some woodland and scrub. There are a variety of orchids, and butterflies such as the brown argus, common blue and dark green fritillary.
The Gill	The Gill	12 hectares (30 acres)	Cranbrook; 51.120°N 0.468°E; TQ728385	NO		This site has been planted with sweet chestnut, which dominates most of it. Flora includes bluebells, early purple orchids and marsh-marigold.
Hewitt's Chalk Bank	Hewitt's Chalk Bank	4 hectares (9.9 acres)	Sevenoaks; 51.346°N 0.124°E; TQ480629	NO		This former refuse tip has a large mound which is the soil from the excavation of a railway tunnel. Habitats are grassland and scrub, and unusual flora include grass vetchling and dark mullein.
Holborough Marshes	Holborough Marshes	35 hectares (86 acres)	Snodland; 51.337°N 0.449°E; TQ707626	YES	SSSI	The marshes have a variety of wetland habitats; freshwater marshes, woodland, brackish and tidal reedbeds, wet grassland, scrub, and freshwater and saline dykes. Flowers include the grey mouse-ear.
Hothfield Heathlands	Hothfield Heathlands	86 hectares (210 acres)	Ashford; 51.177°N 0.820°E; TQ972458	YES	LNR, SSSI	This site has areas of heath and the best valley bog in the county, both habitats which are uncommon in Kent. Over a thousand insect species have been recorded, several of which are nationally rare, such as the bee Lasioglossum semilucens and the cranefly Tipula holoptera.
Ivy Hatch	Ivy Hatch	0.5 hectares (1.2 acres)	Sevenoaks; 51.269°N 0.274°E; TQ587547	YES		Several streams run through this small site, and there are many wetland plants, including sphagnum moss. There are many common spotted orchids, and trees such as alders and hazels.
Kemsing Down	Kemsing Down	16 hectares (40 acres)	Sevenoaks; 51.313°N 0.223°E; TQ550594	YES	AONB	Habitats in this downland site include ancient and secondary woodland, scrub and chalk grassland. There are man, pyramidal and common spotted orchids, and butterflies include the brown argus and grizzled skipper.
Kiln Wood	Kiln Wood	6 hectares (15 acres)	Maidstone; 51.232°N 0.700°E; TQ886515	YES		This wood is mainly oak, hornbeam and hazel, and it is managed by coppicing. A stream at the northern end has lady fern, herb paris and broad buckler-fern.
The Larches	The Larches	25 hectares (62 acres)	Maidstone; 51.299°N 0.562°E; TQ787587	YES	AONB, NCR, SAC, SSSI	This site has chalk grassland, woods and scrub. Grassland flora include autumn gentian, pyramidal orchid and broad-leaved helleborine, and there are butterflies such as the chalkhill blue and marbled white.
Lydden Temple Ewell	File:Lydden and Temple Ewell Downs	90 hectares (220 acres)	Dover; 51.162°N 1.255°E; TR277453	YES	NCR, NNR SAC, SSSI	This site has some of the finest chalk downland in Europe. Flora include the burnt-tip and early spider orchid. There are butterflies such the Adonis blue and chalkhill blue.
Marden Meadow	Marden Meadow	5.6 hectares (14 acres)	Tonbridge; 51.173°N 0.521°E; TQ763445	YES	SSSI	These unimproved neutral meadows are cut for hay each year and then grazed. There are also ponds and hedgerows which are probably of ancient origin, and trees include midland hawthorns and wild service-trees.
Nashenden Down	Nashenden Down	55 hectares (140 acres)	Rochester; 51.364°N 0.484°E; TQ730657	YES	AONB	This nature reserve was created from a large arable field in 2009, and it is being regenerated with chalk grassland species, partly by colonisation from a steep bank which escaped ploughing and partly by seed spreading. An area of scrub provides a habitat for birds.
Oare Marshes	Oare Marshes	81 hectares (200 acres)	Faversham; 51.346°N 0.889°E; TR013647	FP	LNR, NCR Ramsar, SPA SSSI	This site has salt marshes, fresh water dykes and reed beds. It is of international importance for migratory, overwintering and breeding wetland birds.
Oare Meadow	Oare Meadow	2 hectares (4.9 acres)	Dover; 51.331°N 0.879°E; TR006630	YES	SSSI	This small site has a pond and bog, which are fed by a spring. Wetland plants include ragged-robin and yellow iris There is also a flower meadow.
Old Park Hill	Old Park Hill	40 hectares (99 acres)	Dover; 51.147°N 1.279°E; TR294438	YES	AONB	This steeply sloping hill has woodland, scrub and grassland. Scrub encroached on the other areas when the site was neglected, and KWT is removing it to restore its mainly grassland habitat, providing an increased area suitable for meadow butterflies, reptiles and orchids.
Park Gate Down	Park Gate Down	7 hectares (17 acres)	Canterbury; 51.169°N 1.010°E; TR168457	YES	SAC, SSSI	This dry valley has ancient chalk grassland with areas of scrub and woodland. It has many orchid species such as early-purple, common-spotted, pyramidal, green-veined and monkey.
Parsonage Wood	Parsonage Wood	9 hectares (22 acres)	Cranbrook; 51.067°N 0.563°E; TQ797329	YES	SSSI	This is an example of a woodland ghyll in the High Weald. The trees are mainly coppiced, but some of the ground flora are species which are indicative of ancient woods, such as butcher's broom, violet helleborine and pendulous sedge.
Polhill Bank	Polhill Bank	4 hectares (9.9 acres)	Sevenoaks; 51.324°N 0.166°E; TQ510605	YES	AONB	This chalk grassland site is on a south-east facing slope. There is also an area of scrub, which provides a habitat for birds such as blackcap and willow warbler. Flora include rock-rose.
Quarry Wood	Quarry Wood	26 hectares (64 acres)	Maidstone; 51.239°N 0.465°E; TQ722518	YES		The wood is mainly sweet chestnut coppice, but at the northern end there are mature oak and beech trees. A small stream runs along the bottom of the valley.
Queendown Warren	Queendown Warren	76 hectares (190 acres)	Sittingbourne; 51.334°N 0.621°E; TQ827629	YES	AONB, LNR, NCR, SAC, SSSI	This site has dry grassland and woodland on a south facing slope. It has two rare plants, early spider orchid and meadow clary, and a rich variety of insects.
Romney Marsh	Romney Marsh	11 hectares (27 acres)	New Romney; 50.997°N 0.960°E; TR078261	YES	LNR, Ramsar, SSSI	This site is formed from ancient sand dunes which have been left behind as the sea has retreated over the last two thousand years, and it has plants such as sea spurrey. There are also ponds left by gravel extraction, some permanent and others which dry out in the summer.
Ruxley Gravel Pits	Ruxley Gravel Pits	11 hectares (27 acres)	Orpington; 51.410°N 0.118°E; TQ474700	NO	SSSI	There are four water filled pits with areas of fen. Over 500 plants species have been recorded and 169 birds, out of which 53 breed on the site. There are also 23 butterfly species, 23 dragonfly and over 500 beetles. Water quality is high.
Sandwich and Pegwell Bay	Pegwell Bay	615 hectares (1,520 acres)	Ramsgate; 51.320°N 1.358°E; TR341632	YES	GCR, LNR, NCR, NNR, Ramsar, SAC, SPA, SSSI	This site has the only ancient dune pasture in the county, and other habitats include saltmarshes, shingle beaches and sand dunes. It is internationally important for its birds, including black-tailed godwit, oystercatchers and sandwich terns.
Sevenoaks Wildlife Reserve	Sevenoaks Wildlife Reserve	73 hectares (180 acres)	Sevenoaks; 51.287°N 0.178°E; TQ520565	PP	SSSI	This site has flooded gravel pits which have over two thousand species of fauna and flora, including a variety of breeding and wintering birds. There are also areas of reedbeds and woodland.
Sladden Wood	Sladden Wood	7 hectares (17 acres)	Dover; 51.140°N 1.225°E; TR257428	YES		The main trees in this ancient wood are hornbeam, field maple and hazel, and there are ground flora such as green hellebore and yellow archangel.
South Blean	South Blean	329 hectares (810 acres)	Canterbury; 51.275°N 0.999°E; TR093571	YES		This site has native woodland, conifer plantations, heath and bog. KWT is gradually removing the conifers to allow natural regeneration, and it also manages the site by grazing and coppicing. Birds include nightjars and nightingales.
South Swale	South Swale	420 hectares (1,000 acres)	Whitstable; 51.345°N 0.957°E; TR060648	YES	LNR, Ramsar, SPA, SSSI	This coastal site has wetland and grassland, with mudflats which attract a large population of waders and wildfowl in winter. Flora include yellow horned-popies, sea-lavender and golden samphires.
Spong Wood	Spong Wood	18 hectares (44 acres)	Ashford; 51.169°N 1.034°E; TR122455	YES		Common trees in this coppiced wood include sweet chestnut, oak, hornbeam and hazel. Orchids can be found on the high slopes and ramsons lower down.
Spuckles and Kennelling Woods	Spuckles Wood	20 hectares (49 acres)	Faversham; 51.238°N 0.802°E; TQ957525	YES	AONB	These ancient woods on the steep escarpment of the Kent Downs have diverse trees including mature oaks and beeches. Flora include greater butterfly and lady orchids.
Stockbury Hill Wood	Stockbury Hill Wood	5 hectares (12 acres)	Sittingbourne; 51.317°N 0.633°E; TQ836608	NO		This wood is mainly yew, hornbeam and oak. It has a variety of orchids, such as bird's-nest, lady and fly. There are orange tip and holly blue butterflies.
Stone Wood	Stone Wood	Not available	Ashford; 51.099°N 0.803°E; TQ964370	YES		This site was clear felled in 1992 and left to regenerate naturally. The KWT acquired it in 2002 and is encouraging native plants and animals to occupy it.
Turners Field	Turners Field	11 hectares (27 acres)	Tenterden; 51.074°N 0.685°E; TQ882340	YES		This field is managed as part of an organic farm, and has grassland, a stream, a pond, scrub and mature woodland. Herbs include pepper saxifrage, black knapweed and bird's-foot trefoil.
Tyland Barn	Tyland Barn	Not available	Maidstone; 51.306°N 0.515°E; TQ754593	YES		This is the headquarters of the KWT. It has a nature park which is designed to show the variety of habitats in the county, such as a pond, wildflower meadows and woodland.
Wattle Wood	Wattle Wood	1 hectare (2.5 acres)	Tenterden; 51.087°N 0.673°E; TQ873354	YES		This ancient coppice with standards wood has diverse flora and fauna. There are many early purple orchids, and mammals such as dormice.
West Blean and Thornden Woods	Thornden Wood	490 hectares (1,200 acres)	Herne Bay; 51.328°N 1.075°E; TR143633	YES	NCR, SSSI	More than fifty species of birds breed in these woods, and the diverse invertebrate fauna include five nationally rare and thirteen nationally scarce species. There is also a population of the declining and protected hazel dormouse. In July 2022, as part of the Wilder Blean project, European bison were released in to West Blean and Thornden Woods.
Westfield Wood	Westfield Wood	5 hectares (12 acres)	Aylesford; 51.318°N 0.517°E; TQ755607	YES	AONB, NCR,SAC, SSSI	This is described by the KWT as an "internationally important yew woodland" on steep chalk slopes. There is also an area of hazel and ash coppice, with ground flora such as butcher's broom and green hellebore.
Yockletts Bank	Yockletts Bank	23 hectares (57 acres)	Canterbury; 51.189°N 1.037°E; TR123477	YES	AONB, SSSI	This sloping site has woodland on dry chalk soils. There are diverse woodland breeding birds, and the ground flora is dominated by bluebells, but there are also many orchids.

== Wildlife ==
The Wilder Blean project, headed up by the Wildwood Trust and Kent Wildlife Trust, introduced European bison to a 2,500-acre conservation area in Blean, near Canterbury. The reintroduction to the UK in 2022, the first time in 6000 years, consisted of a herd of 3 females and 1 male. Unknown to the rangers, one of the females was pregnant and gave birth to a calf in October 2022, marking the first wild bison born in the UK for the first time in millennia. The herd's matriarch gave birth to a male calf in winter 2023. In October 2024, the two younger females of the herd gave birth to an additional two female calves, increasing the herd's numbers to 8 animals in total. In January 2025, the project was recognized as one of The Big Issue’s top Changemakers of 2025.

The Chough Reintroduction Project, a partnership between Kent Wildlife Trust, Wildwood Trust and Paradise Park, Cornwall, reintroduced the red-billed chough to South East England where it had previously been extinct for over two centuries. The first of several releases took place at a secret location in Dover in July 2023, releasing eight choughs which came from a zoo-based breeding programme coordinated by Paradise Park in Cornwall. By October 2023, the released choughs had been spotted flying as far as Dover Castle. In May 2024, the first wild red-billed chough chick to be born in Kent for generations was discovered at Dover Castle and was reported to have fledged successfully the following month, but went missing during strong winds in early July. A second release of six female choughs into the wild took place in July 2024. By September 2024 an additional six male choughs had been released into the wild, increasing the total number of wild red-billed chough in Kent to nineteen animals.

== See also ==
- List of Sites of Special Scientific Interest in Kent
- List of Local Nature Reserves in Kent
