= List of Wildlife Trust nature reserves =

A complete list of Wildlife Trust nature reserves in Scotland, Wales, Northern Ireland and England:

== A ==
- Abberton Reservoir (Essex Wildlife Trust)
- Abbey Fishponds (Berks, Bucks & Oxon Wildlife Trust)
- Abbots Moss (Cheshire Wildlife Trust)
- Abbotts Hall Farm (Essex Wildlife Trust)
- Abercamlo Bog (Radnorshire Wildlife Trust)
- Abercorris (North Wales Wildlife Trust)
- Aberduna (North Wales Wildlife Trust)
- Abington Meadows (The Wildlife Trust for Bedfordshire, Cambridgeshire and Northamptonshire)
- Abram Flash (The Wildlife Trust for Lancashire, Manchester & north Merseyside)
- Addiewell Bing (Scottish Wildlife Trust)
- Adel Dam Nature Reserve (Yorkshire Wildlife Trust)
- Adle Mudflats (Suffolk Wildlife Trust)
- Agden Bog Nature Reserve (The Wildlife Trust for Sheffield and Rotherham)
- Aileshurst Coppice (Worcestershire Wildlife Trust)
- Aisholt Wood (Somerset Wildlife Trust)
- Aldbury Nowers (Herts & Middlesex Wildlife Trust)
- Aldercar Flash (Nottinghamshire Wildlife Trust)
- Alderfen Broad (Norfolk Wildlife Trust)
- Aller & Beer Woods (Somerset Wildlife Trust)
- Allerthorpe Common Nature Reserve (Yorkshire Wildlife Trust)
- Allimore Green Common (Staffordshire Wildlife Trust)
- Allt Grug Garn (The Wildlife Trust for South & West Wales)
- Allt Pencnwc (The Wildlife Trust for South & West Wales)
- Allt-yr-Yn Local Nature Reserve (Gwent Wildlife Trust)
- Alpine Meadow (Herts & Middlesex Wildlife Trust)
- Altar Stones (Leicestershire & Rutland Wildlife Trust)
- Alvecote Meadows (Warwickshire Wildlife Trust)
- Alvecote Pools (Warwickshire Wildlife Trust)
- Amberley Wildbrooks (Sussex Wildlife Trust)
- Amwell Quarry (Herts & Middlesex Wildlife Trust)
- Ancaster Valley (Lincolnshire Wildlife Trust)
- Ancells Farm (Hampshire & IOW Wildlife Trust)
- Andrew's Wood (Devon Wildlife Trust)
- Annesley Woodhouse Quarry (Nottinghamshire Wildlife Trust)
- Annstead Dunes (Northumberland Wildlife Trust)
- Ardley Quarry (Berks, Bucks & Oxon Wildlife Trust)
- Arger Fen & Spouse's Vale (Suffolk Wildlife Trust)
- Argill Woods Nature Reserve (Cumbria Wildlife Trust)
- Arle Grove (Gloucestershire Wildlife Trust)
- Arlesey Old Moat and Glebe Meadows (The Wildlife Trust for Bedfordshire, Cambridgeshire and Northamptonshire)
- Armstrong Wood (Cornwall Wildlife Trust)
- Arnold Memorial (Northumberland Wildlife Trust)
- Arnold's Meadow (Lincolnshire Wildlife Trust)
- Arreton Down (Hampshire & IOW Wildlife Trust)
- Arthur's Meadow (The Wildlife Trust for Bedfordshire, Cambridgeshire and Northamptonshire)
- Ash Moor (Devon Wildlife Trust)
- Ash Ranges (Surrey Wildlife Trust)
- Asham Meads (Berks, Bucks & Oxon Wildlife Trust)
- Ashberry Nature Reserve (Yorkshire Wildlife Trust)
- Ashculm Turbary (Devon Wildlife Trust)
- Ashford Warren & Hoads Wood (Kent Wildlife Trust)
- Ashlawn Cutting (Warwickshire Wildlife Trust)
- Ashleworth Ham (Gloucestershire Wildlife Trust)
- Ashley Wood Nature Reserve (Dorset Wildlife Trust)
- Ashton Court Meadow (Avon Wildlife Trust)
- Ashtons Meadow (Nottinghamshire Wildlife Trust)
- Ashwell Quarry and Quarry Springs (Herts & Middlesex Wildlife Trust)
- Askham Bog Nature Reserve (Yorkshire Wildlife Trust)
- Astley Moss (The Wildlife Trust for Lancashire, Manchester & north Merseyside)
- Aston Clinton Ragpits (Berks, Bucks & Oxon Wildlife Trust)
- Astonbury Wood (Herts and Middlesex Wildlife Trust)
- Attenborough Nature Reserve (Nottinghamshire Wildlife Trust)
- Aubrey Buxton (Essex Wildlife Trust)
- Auchalton Meadow (Scottish Wildlife Trust)
- Aughton Woods (The Wildlife Trust for Lancashire, Manchester & north Merseyside)
- Augill Pasture Nature Reserve (Cumbria Wildlife Trust)
- Avery's Pightle (Berks, Bucks & Oxon Wildlife Trust)
- Avon Valley (Worcestershire Wildlife Trust)
- Ayr Gorge Woodlands (Scottish Wildlife Trust)
- Ayres Visitor Centre and Nature Trail (Manx Wildlife Trust)

== B ==
- Baal Hill Wood (Durham Wildlife Trust)
- Babcary Meadows (Somerset Wildlife Trust)
- Badger's Hill (Worcestershire Wildlife Trust)
- Badgeworth (Gloucestershire Wildlife Trust)
- Baglan Reserve (The Wildlife Trust for South & West Wales)
- Bagmere (Cheshire Wildlife Trust)
- Bagmoor Common (Surrey Wildlife Trust)
- Bailey Einon (Radnorshire Wildlife Trust)
- Bakers Pit (Cornwall Wildlife Trust)
- Bakethin (Northumberland Wildlife Trust)
- Balcombe Marsh (Sussex Wildlife Trust)
- Balgavies Loch (Scottish Wildlife Trust)
- Ballachuan Hazel Wood (Scottish Wildlife Trust)
- Ballagan Glen (Scottish Wildlife Trust)
- Ballalough Reedbeds (Manx Wildlife Trust)
- Balloo Wetland (Ulster Wildlife Trust)
- Balloo Woodland (Ulster Wildlife Trust)
- Balls Wood (Herts & Middlesex Wildlife Trust)
- Ballynahone Bog (Ulster Wildlife Trust)
- Balnaguard Glen (Scottish Wildlife Trust)
- Bankhead Moss (Scottish Wildlife Trust)
- Banovallum House (Lincolnshire Wildlife Trust)
- Ban-y-Gor Woods (Gloucestershire Wildlife Trust)
- Barford Wood and Meadows (The Wildlife Trust for Bedfordshire, Cambridgeshire and Northamptonshire)
- Barkbooth Lot Nature Reserve (Cumbria Wildlife Trust)
- Barkway Chalk Pit (Herts & Middlesex Wildlife Trust)
- Barnaby's Sands and Burrows Marsh (The Wildlife Trust for Lancashire, Manchester & north Merseyside)
- Barnes Meadow (The Wildlife Trust for Bedfordshire, Cambridgeshire and Northamptonshire)
- Barnyards Marsh (Scottish Wildlife Trust)
- Barrow Blow Wells (Lincolnshire Wildlife Trust)
- Barrow Burn Wood (Northumberland Wildlife Trust)
- Barrow Haven Reedbed (Lincolnshire Wildlife Trust)
- Hook Common and Bartley Heath (Hampshire & IOW Wildlife Trust)
- Barton Broad National Nature Reserve (Norfolk Wildlife Trust)
- Barton Gravel Pit (The Wildlife Trust for Bedfordshire, Cambridgeshire and Northamptonshire)
- Barton Pool (Derbyshire Wildlife Trust)
- Baston Fen (Lincolnshire Wildlife Trust)
- Bateswood (Staffordshire Wildlife Trust)
- Bathampton Meadow (Avon Wildlife Trust)
- Bawsinch and Duddingston (Scottish Wildlife Trust)
- Bay Pond (Surrey Wildlife Trust)
- Beacon Hill (Gwent Wildlife Trust)
- Beacon Hill (Radnorshire Wildlife Trust)
- Beacon Hill Conservation Park (Nottinghamshire Wildlife Trust)
- Beacon Hill Urban Wildlife Centre (Dorset Wildlife Trust)
- Beaconwood and the Winsel (Worcestershire Wildlife Trust)
- Beales Meadows (Cornwall Wildlife Trust)
- Bedfords Parks (Essex Wildlife Trust)
- Beechwoods (The Wildlife Trust for Bedfordshire, Cambridgeshire and Northamptonshire)
- Begwary Brook (The Wildlife Trust for Bedfordshire, Cambridgeshire and Northamptonshire)
- Bell Crag Flow (Northumberland Wildlife Trust)
- Bellenden Road (London Wildlife Trust)
- Belmaduthy Dam (Scottish Wildlife Trust)
- Beltingham River Gravels (Northumberland Wildlife Trust)
- Bemersyde Moss (Scottish Wildlife Trust)
- Ben Mor Coigach (Scottish Wildlife Trust)
- Benshaw Moor (Northumberland Wildlife Trust)
- Bentinick Banks (Nottinghamshire Wildlife Trust)
- Bernwood Meadows (Berks, Bucks & Oxon Wildlife Trust)
- Berry Wood (The Wildlife Trust for South & West Wales)
- Besthorpe Nature Reserve (Nottinghamshire Wildlife Trust)
- Betchworth Quarry (Surrey Wildlife Trust)
- Betty Church & Cwm Ivy (The Wildlife Trust for South & West Wales)
- Betty Daw's Wood (Gloucestershire Wildlife Trust)
- Beverley Meads and Fishponds Wood (London Wildlife Trust)
- Bickham Wood (Somerset Wildlife Trust)
- Big Pool Wood (North Wales Wildlife Trust)
- Big Waters (Northumberland Wildlife Trust)
- Bigbury Camp (Kent Wildlife Trust)
- Birch Moss Covert (Cheshire Wildlife Trust)
- Birch Road Pond (Shropshire Wildlife Trust)
- Birdbrook Nature Reserve (London Wildlife Trust)
- Birmingham EcoPark (The Wildlife Trust for Birmingham and the Black Country)
- Bishop Middleham Quarry (Durham Wildlife Trust)
- Bishop Monkton Railway Cutting Nature Reserve (Yorkshire Wildlife Trust)
- Bishop's Field (Worcestershire Wildlife Trust)
- Bishopswood Meadows (Somerset Wildlife Trust)
- Bisley & West End Commons (Surrey Wildlife Trust)
- Bissoe Valley (Cornwall Wildlife Trust)
- Black Brook (Staffordshire Wildlife Trust)
- Black Firs & Cranberry Bog (Staffordshire Wildlife Trust)
- Black Firs Wood (Cheshire Wildlife Trust)
- Black Lake (Cheshire Wildlife Trust)
- Black Moss Covert (Cheshire Wildlife Trust)
- Blacka Moor (Sheffield Wildlife Trust)
- Blackadon (Devon Wildlife Trust)
- Blackcraig Wood (Scottish Wildlife Trust)
- Blackhall Rocks (Durham Wildlife Trust)
- Blackmoor Copse (Wiltshire Wildlife Trust)
- Blaenant y Gwyddyl (The Wildlife Trust for South & West Wales)
- Blaen-y-Weirglodd (North Wales Wildlife Trust)
- Blagrove Common (Herts & Middlesex Wildlife Trust)
- Blakehill Farm (Wiltshire Wildlife Trust)
- Blake's Pools (Avon Wildlife Trust)
- Blashford Lakes (Hampshire & IOW Wildlife Trust)
- Blaxhall Common (Suffolk Wildlife Trust)
- Blenheim Farm (Berks, Bucks & Oxon Wildlife Trust)
- Blessingbourne (Ulster Wildlife Trust)
- Bloody Oak's Quarry (Leicestershire & Rutland Wildlife Trust)
- Blow's Downs (The Wildlife Trust for Bedfordshire, Cambridgeshire and Northamptonshire)
- Blue Bell Hill (Kent Wildlife Trust)
- Blue House Farm (Essex Wildlife Trust)
- Boathouse Field Nature Reserve (Cumbria Wildlife Trust)
- Boddington Meadow (The Wildlife Trust for Bedfordshire, Cambridgeshire and Northamptonshire)
- Bog Meadows (Ulster Wildlife Trust)
- Bogburn Flood Lagoons (Scottish Wildlife Trust)
- Boilton, Nab, Redscar and Tunbrook Woods (The Wildlife Trust for Lancashire, Manchester & north Merseyside)
- Bolgoed Quarry (The Wildlife Trust for South & West Wales)
- Bolton Percy Station Nature Reserve (Yorkshire Wildlife Trust)
- Bolton-on-Swale Lake Nature Reserve (Yorkshire Wildlife Trust)
- Bo'mains Meadow (Scottish Wildlife Trust)
- Bonny Wood (Suffolk Wildlife Trust)
- Boon's Copse (Somerset Wildlife Trust)
- Booton Common (Norfolk Wildlife Trust)
- Boston Road Brick Pits (Lincolnshire Wildlife Trust)
- Bosvenning Common (Cornwall Wildlife Trust)
- Bough Beech Visitor Centre (Kent Wildlife Trust)
- Boultham Mere (Lincolnshire Wildlife Trust)
- Bovey Heathfield (Devon Wildlife Trust)
- Bowdown Woods (Berks, Bucks & Oxon Wildlife Trust)
- Bowesfield (Tees Valley Wildlife Trust)
- Bowness on Solway Nature Reserve (Cumbria Wildlife Trust)
- Boynes Coppice and Meadows (Worcestershire Wildlife Trust)
- Bracketts Coppice (Dorset Wildlife Trust)
- Bradfield Woods (Suffolk Wildlife Trust)
- Bradlaugh Fields (The Wildlife Trust for Bedfordshire, Cambridgeshire and Northamptonshire)
- Brae Pasture Nature Reserve (Yorkshire Wildlife Trust)
- Braeburn Park (London Wildlife Trust)
- Bramley Bank Local Nature Reserve (London Wildlife Trust)
- Brampton Wood (The Wildlife Trust for Bedfordshire, Cambridgeshire and Northamptonshire)
- Branches Fork Meadows (Gwent Wildlife Trust)
- Brandon Hill Nature Park (Avon Wildlife Trust)
- Brandon Marsh SSSI Nature Reserve and Visitor Centre (Warwickshire Wildlife Trust)
- Brankley Pastures (Staffordshire Wildlife Trust)
- Brassey (Gloucestershire Wildlife Trust)
- Bray Pit (Berks, Bucks & Oxon Wildlife Trust)
- Breagle Glen (Manx Wildlife Trust)
- Brechfa Pool (Brecknock Wildlife Trust)
- Breck's Plantation (Nottinghamshire Wildlife Trust)
- Brenchley Wood (Kent Wildlife Trust)
- Brentmoor Heath (Surrey Wildlife Trust)
- Brewsdale (Tees Valley Wildlife Trust)
- Briarwood Banks (Northumberland Wildlife Trust)
- Brickfield Meadow (Sussex Wildlife Trust)
- Brilley Green Dingle (Herefordshire Nature Trust)
- Brimley Hill Mire (Somerset Wildlife Trust)
- Broad Colney Lakes (Herts & Middlesex Wildlife Trust)
- Broad Pool (The Wildlife Trust for South & West Wales)
- Broadham Down (Kent Wildlife Trust)
- Broadhead Clough Nature Reserve (Yorkshire Wildlife Trust)
- Broadhurst Edge Wood (Derbyshire Wildlife Trust)
- Broadmoor Wood (Worcestershire Wildlife Trust)
- Broadoak Orchard (Dorset Wildlife Trust)
- Broadstreet & Backside Commons (Surrey Wildlife Trust)
- Broadwater Lake (Herts & Middlesex Wildlife Trust)
- Broadway Gravel Pit (Worcestershire Wildlife Trust)
- Brock Wood (Scottish Wildlife Trust)
- Brockadale Nature Reserve (Yorkshire Wildlife Trust)
- Brockham Lime Works (Surrey Wildlife Trust)
- Brockholes Nature Reserve (The Wildlife Trust for Lancashire, Manchester & north Merseyside)
- Brockholes Wood (Derbyshire Wildlife Trust)
- Brockwells Meadows SSSI (Gwent Wildlife Trust)
- Bromeswell Green (Suffolk Wildlife Trust)
- Brook Meadow (Warwickshire Wildlife Trust)
- Brook Vessons (Shropshire Wildlife Trust)
- Brookes Reserve (Essex Wildlife Trust)
- Brookheys Covert (Cheshire Wildlife Trust)
- Brooklands Farm (Dorset Wildlife Trust)
- Brookwood Lye (Surrey Wildlife Trust)
- Brotheridge Green (Worcestershire Wildlife Trust)
- Broughton Down (Hampshire & IOW Wildlife Trust)
- Brown End Quarry (Staffordshire Wildlife Trust)
- Brown Robin Nature Reserve (Cumbria Wildlife Trust)
- Brown's Folly (Avon Wildlife Trust)
- Brown's Hill Quarry (Leicestershire & Rutland Wildlife Trust)
- Brownsea Island (Dorset Wildlife Trust)
- Bryn Pydew (North Wales Wildlife Trust)
- Brynna Woods (The Wildlife Trust for South & West Wales)
- Bryworth Lane Railway (Gloucestershire Wildlife Trust)
- Bubwith Acres (Somerset Wildlife Trust)
- Buff Wood (The Wildlife Trust for Bedfordshire, Cambridgeshire and Northamptonshire)
- Bugbrooke Meadow (The Wildlife Trust for Bedfordshire, Cambridgeshire and Northamptonshire)
- Bugdens Meadow (Dorset Wildlife Trust)
- Bugeilyn (Montgomeryshire Wildlife Trust)
- Bull's Wood (Suffolk Wildlife Trust)
- Bunny Old Wood (Nottinghamshire Wildlife Trust)
- Burfa Bog (Radnorshire Wildlife Trust)
- Burham Down (Kent Wildlife Trust)
- Burham Marsh (Kent Wildlife Trust)
- Burledge Hill (Avon Wildlife Trust)
- Burners Heath and Swallows Pond (Surrey Wildlife Trust)* Burnhope Pond (Durham Wildlife Trust)
- Burns Beck Moss Nature Reserve (Cumbria Wildlife Trust)
- Burnt Wood (Staffordshire Wildlife Trust)
- Burtle Moor (Somerset Wildlife Trust)
- Burton and Chingford Ponds (Sussex Wildlife Trust)
- Burton Leonard Lime Quarries (Yorkshire Wildlife Trust)
- Burton Riggs Nature Reserve (Yorkshire Wildlife Trust)
- Bushmoor Coppice (Shropshire Wildlife Trust)
- Butterburn Flow (Cumbria Wildlife Trust)
- Butterburn Flow (Northumberland Wildlife Trust)
- Bwlytai Wood (Shropshire Wildlife Trust)
- Byfield Pool (The Wildlife Trust for Bedfordshire, Cambridgeshire and Northamptonshire)
- Bystock (Devon Wildlife Trust)

== C ==
- Cabilla & Redrice Woods (Cornwall Wildlife Trust)
- Cadishead Moss (The Wildlife Trust for Lancashire, Manchester & north Merseyside)
- Cae Bryntywarch (Brecknock Wildlife Trust)
- Cae Eglwys (Brecknock Wildlife Trust)
- Cae Pwll Y Bo (Brecknock Wildlife Trust)
- Caeau Llety Cybi (The Wildlife Trust for South & West Wales)
- Caeau Pen y Clip (North Wales Wildlife Trust)
- Caeau Tan y Bwlch (North Wales Wildlife Trust)
- Caer Bran (Cornwall Wildlife Trust)
- Caldicot Pill (Gwent Wildlife Trust)
- Calley Heath Nature Reserve (Yorkshire Wildlife Trust)
- Calvert Jubilee (Berks, Bucks & Oxon Wildlife Trust)
- Calverton Road (Nottinghamshire Wildlife Trust)
- Cambourne (The Wildlife Trust for Bedfordshire, Cambridgeshire and Northamptonshire)
- Cambus Pools (Scottish Wildlife Trust)
- Camley Street Natural Park (London Wildlife Trust)
- Candlesby Hill Quarry (Lincolnshire Wildlife Trust)
- Cannop Bridge Marsh (Gloucestershire Wildlife Trust)
- Canon Tump Common (Herefordshire Nature Trust)
- Captain's Wood (Suffolk Wildlife Trust)
- Carbrook Ravine (Sheffield Wildlife Trust)
- Cardigan Bay Marine Wildlife Centre (The Wildlife Trust for South & West Wales)
- Cardigan Island (The Wildlife Trust for South & West Wales)
- Carlingnose Point (Scottish Wildlife Trust)
- Carlton Marshes (Suffolk Wildlife Trust)
- Carn Moor (Cornwall Wildlife Trust)
- Carr House Meadows (Sheffield Wildlife Trust)
- Carr Vale Flash (Derbyshire Wildlife Trust)
- Carron Dam (Scottish Wildlife Trust)
- Carron Glen (Scottish Wildlife Trust)
- Carsegowan Moss (Scottish Wildlife Trust)
- Carstramon Wood (Scottish Wildlife Trust)
- Carvers Rocks (Derbyshire Wildlife Trust)
- Cassiobury Park (Herts & Middlesex Wildlife Trust)
- Castern Wood (Staffordshire Wildlife Trust)
- Castle Marshes (Suffolk Wildlife Trust)
- Castle Woods (The Wildlife Trust for South & West Wales)
- Catcott Complex (Somerset Wildlife Trust)
- Catcott North (Somerset Wildlife Trust)
- Catherington Down (Hampshire & IOW Wildlife Trust)
- Catherton Common (Shropshire Wildlife Trust)
- Cathkin Marsh (Scottish Wildlife Trust)
- Cattersty Gill (Tees Valley Wildlife Trust)
- Cefn Cenarth (Radnorshire Wildlife Trust)
- Cemaes Head (The Wildlife Trust for South & West Wales)
- Cemlyn (North Wales Wildlife Trust)
- Centenary Riverside (Sheffield Wildlife Trust)
- Centre for Wildlife Gardening (London Wildlife Trust)
- Centre of the Earth (The Wildlife Trust for Birmingham and the Black Country)
- Chaceley Meadow (Gloucestershire Wildlife Trust)
- Chaddesley Woods National Nature Reserve (Worcestershire Wildlife Trust)
- Chafer Wood Nature Reserve (Yorkshire Wildlife Trust)
- Chafford Gorges Nature Park (Essex Wildlife Trust)
- Chailey Warren (Sussex Wildlife Trust)
- Chainbridge (Nottinghamshire Wildlife Trust)
- Chance Wood (Worcestershire Wildlife Trust)
- Chancellors Farm (Somerset Wildlife Trust)
- Chapel Bank (London Wildlife Trust)
- Chapel Pit (Lincolnshire Wildlife Trust)
- Chappetts Copse (Hampshire & IOW Wildlife Trust)
- Charfield Meadow (Avon Wildlife Trust)
- Charley Woods (Leicestershire & Rutland Wildlife Trust)
- Charnwood Lodge Nature Reserve (Leicestershire & Rutland Wildlife Trust)
- Chawridge Bank (Berks, Bucks & Oxon Wildlife Trust)
- Cheddar Complex (Somerset Wildlife Trust)
- Cheddar Wood Edge (Somerset Wildlife Trust)
- Chedworth (Gloucestershire Wildlife Trust)
- Chee Dale (Derbyshire Wildlife Trust)
- Cherry Hinton Chalk Pits (The Wildlife Trust for Bedfordshire, Cambridgeshire and Northamptonshire)
- Chettisham Meadow (The Wildlife Trust for Bedfordshire, Cambridgeshire and Northamptonshire)
- Chew Valley Lake (Avon Wildlife Trust)
- Chigborough Lakes (Essex Wildlife Trust)
- Chilton Moor (Somerset Wildlife Trust)
- Chilwell Meadow (Nottinghamshire Wildlife Trust)
- Chimney Meadows (Berks, Bucks & Oxon Wildlife Trust)
- Chinnor Hill (Berks, Bucks & Oxon Wildlife Trust)
- Chinthurst Hill (Surrey Wildlife Trust)
- Chitty's Common (Surrey Wildlife Trust)
- Chobham Common (Surrey Wildlife Trust)
- Cholsey Marsh (Berks, Bucks & Oxon Wildlife Trust)
- Chosen Hill (Gloucestershire Wildlife Trust)
- Christopher Cadbury Reserve (Herefordshire Nature Trust)
- Chudleigh Knighton Heath (Devon Wildlife Trust)
- Chun Downs (Cornwall Wildlife Trust)
- Church Farm (Suffolk Wildlife Trust)
- Churchtown Farm Nature Reserve (Cornwall Wildlife Trust)
- Chyverton (Cornwall Wildlife Trust)
- Clapgate Pits (Lincolnshire Wildlife Trust)
- Clapton Moor (Avon Wildlife Trust)
- Clarborough Tunnel (Nottinghamshire Wildlife Trust)
- Clarke's Pool Meadows (Gloucestershire Wildlife Trust)
- Clattinger Farm (Wiltshire Wildlife Trust)
- Clawthorpe Fell (Cumbria Wildlife Trust)
- Clay Vallets Wood (Herefordshire Nature Trust)
- Claybrookes Marsh (Warwickshire Wildlife Trust)
- Cleaver Heath (Cheshire Wildlife Trust)
- Cleeve Heronry (Avon Wildlife Trust)
- Cley Marshes (Norfolk Wildlife Trust)
- Clifford Common (Herefordshire Nature Trust)
- Clints Quarry Nature Reserve (Cumbria Wildlife Trust)
- Cloatley Meadows (Wiltshire Wildlife Trust)
- Close House Riverside (Northumberland Wildlife Trust)
- Close Sartfield (Manx Wildlife Trust)
- Cloud Wood (Leicestershire & Rutland Wildlife Trust)
- Clouts Wood (Wiltshire Wildlife Trust)
- Clowes Wood and New Fallings Coppice (Warwickshire Wildlife Trust)
- Clunton Coppice (Shropshire Wildlife Trust)
- Coatham Marsh (Tees Valley Wildlife Trust)
- Cock Robin Wood (Warwickshire Wildlife Trust)
- Cockey Down (Wiltshire Wildlife Trust)
- Cockles Fields (Somerset Wildlife Trust)
- Cockshoot Broad (Norfolk Wildlife Trust)
- Coed Barcud (The Wildlife Trust for South & West Wales)
- Coed Cilygroeslwyd (North Wales Wildlife Trust)
- Coed Crafnant (North Wales Wildlife Trust)
- Coed Dyrysiog (Brecknock Wildlife Trust)
- Coed Garnllwyd (The Wildlife Trust for South & West Wales)
- Coed Gawdir (The Wildlife Trust for South & West Wales)
- Coed Llwyn Rhyddid (The Wildlife Trust for South & West Wales)
- Coed Maidie B Goddard (The Wildlife Trust for South & West Wales)
- Coed Meyric Moel (Gwent Wildlife Trust)
- Coed Pendugwm (Montgomeryshire Wildlife Trust)
- Coed Penglanowen (The Wildlife Trust for South & West Wales)
- Coed Pont Pren (The Wildlife Trust for South & West Wales)
- Coed Porthamel (North Wales Wildlife Trust)
- Coed Simdde Lwyd (The Wildlife Trust for South & West Wales)
- Coed Trellyniau (North Wales Wildlife Trust)
- Coed Wern Ddu (The Wildlife Trust for South & West Wales)
- Coed y Bedw (The Wildlife Trust for South & West Wales)
- Coed y Bwl (The Wildlife Trust for South & West Wales)
- Coed y Felin (North Wales Wildlife Trust)
- Colekitchen Down (Surrey Wildlife Trust)
- College Lake (Berks, Bucks & Oxon Wildlife Trust)
- Collin Park Wood (Gloucestershire Wildlife Trust)
- Collingwood (Kent Wildlife Trust)
- Collyer's Brook (Dorset Wildlife Trust)
- Collyweston Quarries (The Wildlife Trust for Bedfordshire, Cambridgeshire and Northamptonshire)
- Colne Point (Essex Wildlife Trust)
- Combs Wood (Suffolk Wildlife Trust)
- Comley Quarry (Shropshire Wildlife Trust)
- Common Hill (Herefordshire Nature Trust)
- Compstall Nature Reserve (Cheshire Wildlife Trust)
- Conigre Mead (Wiltshire Wildlife Trust)
- Cooildarry (Manx Wildlife Trust)
- Cooksbridge Meadow (Sussex Wildlife Trust)
- Coombe Bissett Down (Wiltshire Wildlife Trust)
- Coombe Brook Valley (Avon Wildlife Trust)
- Coombe Heath (Dorset Wildlife Trust)
- Coombe Hill Canal and Meadows (Gloucestershire Wildlife Trust)
- Cooper's Hill (The Wildlife Trust for Bedfordshire, Cambridgeshire and Northamptonshire)
- Cop Lane (The Wildlife Trust for Lancashire, Manchester & north Merseyside)
- Cople Pits (The Wildlife Trust for Bedfordshire, Cambridgeshire and Northamptonshire)
- Copperas Wood (Essex Wildlife Trust)
- Copythorne Common (Hampshire & IOW Wildlife Trust)
- Corfe Mullen Meadow (Dorset Wildlife Trust)
- Cornard Mere (Suffolk Wildlife Trust)
- Cors Bodgynydd (North Wales Wildlife Trust)
- Cors Dyfi (Montgomeryshire Wildlife Trust)
- Cors Goch (North Wales Wildlife Trust)
- Cors Goch (The Wildlife Trust for South & West Wales)
- Cors Ian (The Wildlife Trust for South & West Wales)
- Cors Pum Heol (The Wildlife Trust for South & West Wales)
- Corsehillmuir Wood (Scottish Wildlife Trust)
- Cors-y-Sarnau (North Wales Wildlife Trust)
- Cossington Meadows Nature Reserve (Leicestershire & Rutland Wildlife Trust)
- Cottage Farm (Ulster Wildlife Trust)
- Cotterill Clough (Cheshire Wildlife Trust)
- Cotton Dell (Staffordshire Wildlife Trust)
- Coughton Marsh (Herefordshire Nature Trust)
- Coulters Dean (Hampshire & IOW Wildlife Trust)
- Court Wood (Herefordshire Nature Trust)
- Cowden Pound Pastures (Kent Wildlife Trust)
- Cox's Island (Warwickshire Wildlife Trust)
- Crabtree Ponds (Sheffield Wildlife Trust)
- Crackley Woods (Warwickshire Wildlife Trust)
- Craig Cilhendre Woods (The Wildlife Trust for South & West Wales)
- Craig Sychtyn (Shropshire Wildlife Trust)
- Craig y Rhiwarth (Brecknock Wildlife Trust)
- Cramer Gutter (Shropshire Wildlife Trust)
- Cramside Wood (Derbyshire Wildlife Trust)
- Crane Meadows (London Wildlife Trust)
- Crane Park Island Reserve (London Wildlife Trust)
- Cranham Marsh (Essex Wildlife Trust)
- Cresswell Foreshore (Northumberland Wildlife Trust)
- Cresswell Pond (Northumberland Wildlife Trust)
- Crews Hill Wood (Worcestershire Wildlife Trust)
- Cribb's Meadow National Nature Reserve (Leicestershire & Rutland Wildlife Trust)
- Cricklepit Mill (Devon Wildlife Trust)
- Croes Robert Wood SSSI (Gwent Wildlife Trust)
- Croft Pasture (Leicestershire & Rutland Wildlife Trust)
- Cromers Wood (Kent Wildlife Trust)
- Cromford Canal SSSI (Derbyshire Wildlife Trust)
- Cronk y Bing (Manx Wildlife Trust)
- Crooksbury Hill (Surrey Wildlife Trust)
- Cross Hill Quarry Local Nature Reserve (The Wildlife Trust for Lancashire, Manchester & north Merseyside)
- Crow Wood & Meadow (Herefordshire Nature Trust)
- Crowle Moor (Lincolnshire Wildlife Trust)
- Crowsheath Wood (Essex Wildlife Trust)
- Croxall Lakes (Staffordshire Wildlife Trust)
- CS Lewis Nature Reserve (Berks, Bucks & Oxon Wildlife Trust)
- Cucknells Wood (Surrey Wildlife Trust)
- Cuhere Wood (Gwent Wildlife Trust)
- Cullaloe (Scottish Wildlife Trust)
- Cumbernauld Glen (Scottish Wildlife Trust)
- Curragh Kiondroghad (Manx Wildlife Trust)
- Cutsdean Quarry (Gloucestershire Wildlife Trust)
- Cut-throat Meadow (The Wildlife Trust for Bedfordshire, Cambridgeshire and Northamptonshire)
- Cuttle Pool (Warwickshire Wildlife Trust)
- Cwm Byddog (Radnorshire Wildlife Trust)
- Cwm Claisfer (Brecknock Wildlife Trust)
- Cwm Clettwr (The Wildlife Trust for South & West Wales)
- Cwm Colhuw (The Wildlife Trust for South & West Wales)
- Cwm Oergwm (Brecknock Wildlife Trust)

== D ==
- Dalby Mountain Moorland (Manx Wildlife Trust)
- Dalmellington Moss (Scottish Wildlife Trust)
- Danbury Ridge (Essex Wildlife Trust)
- Dancersend (Berks, Bucks & Oxon Wildlife Trust)
- Danemead (Herts & Middlesex Wildlife Trust)
- Danes Moss (Cheshire Wildlife Trust)
- Daneshill Gravel Pits (Nottinghamshire Wildlife Trust)
- Daneway Banks (Gloucestershire Wildlife Trust)
- Dan-y-Graig (Gwent Wildlife Trust)
- Darland Banks (Kent Wildlife Trust)
- Darren Fawr (Brecknock Wildlife Trust)
- Darsham Marshes (Suffolk Wildlife Trust)
- Dart Valley (Devon Wildlife Trust)
- Daudreath Illtyd (Brecknock Wildlife Trust)
- Davies Meadow (Herefordshire Nature Trust)
- Dawcombe (Surrey Wildlife Trust)
- Dawlish Inner Warren (Devon Wildlife Trust)
- Dawson City Clay Pits (Lincolnshire Wildlife Trust)
- Dean Wood (The Wildlife Trust for Lancashire, Manchester & north Merseyside)
- Deans Green (Warwickshire Wildlife Trust)
- Deborah's Hole (The Wildlife Trust for South & West Wales)
- Decoy Heath (Berks, Bucks & Oxon Wildlife Trust)
- Deep Dale and Topley Pike (Derbyshire Wildlife Trust)
- Deepdene Terrace (Surrey Wildlife Trust)
- Deeping Lakes (Lincolnshire Wildlife Trust)
- Deer's Leap Wood (Wildlife Trust for Birmingham and the Black Country)
- Denaby Ings Nature Reserve (Yorkshire Wildlife Trust)
- Denham Lock Wood (London Wildlife Trust)
- Denton Bank (Kent Wildlife Trust)
- Derwentside (Derbyshire Wildlife Trust)
- Devichoys Wood (Cornwall Wildlife Trust)
- Dew's Farm Sand Pits (London Wildlife Trust)
- Digby Corner (Lincolnshire Wildlife Trust)
- Dimminsdale (Leicestershire & Rutland Wildlife Trust)
- Dingle Marshes (Suffolk Wildlife Trust)
- Distillery Meadows (Wiltshire Wildlife Trust)
- Ditchford Lakes and Meadows (The Wildlife Trust for Bedfordshire, Cambridgeshire and Northamptonshire)
- Ditchling Beacon (Sussex Wildlife Trust)
- Dixton Embankment (Gwent Wildlife Trust)
- Doghouse Grove (The Wildlife Trust for Bedfordshire, Cambridgeshire and Northamptonshire)
- Dogsthorpe Star Pit (The Wildlife Trust for Bedfordshire, Cambridgeshire and Northamptonshire)
- Dole Wood (Lincolnshire Wildlife Trust)
- Dolebury Warren (Avon Wildlife Trust)
- Dolforwyn Woods (Montgomeryshire Wildlife Trust)
- Dolgoch quarry, Shropshire (Shropshire Wildlife Trust)
- Dollypers Hill (Surrey Wildlife Trust)
- Dolydd Hafren (Montgomeryshire Wildlife Trust)
- Dommett Wood (Somerset Wildlife Trust)
- Donna Nook NNR (Lincolnshire Wildlife Trust)
- Dorothy Farrer's Spring Wood (Cumbria Wildlife Trust)
- Dougie's Pond (Northumberland Wildlife Trust)
- Downe Bank (Kent Wildlife Trust)
- Downhill Meadow (Cornwall Wildlife Trust)
- Dowrog Common (The Wildlife Trust for South & West Wales)
- Doxey Marshes (Staffordshire Wildlife Trust)
- Drake Street Meadow (Worcestershire Wildlife Trust)
- Drakelow (Derbyshire Wildlife Trust)
- Draycote Meadows (Warwickshire Wildlife Trust)
- Draycott Sleights (Somerset Wildlife Trust)
- Droitwich Community Woods (Worcestershire Wildlife Trust)
- Dropshort Marsh (The Wildlife Trust for Bedfordshire, Cambridgeshire and Northamptonshire)
- Drostre Wood (Brecknock Wildlife Trust)
- Drumburgh Moss Nature Reserve (Cumbria Wildlife Trust)
- Drummains Reedbed (Scottish Wildlife Trust)
- Druridge Pools (Northumberland Wildlife Trust)
- Dry Sandford Pit (Berks, Bucks & Oxon Wildlife Trust)
- Dubbs Moss Nature Reserve (Cumbria Wildlife Trust)
- Duckmanton Railway Cutting (Derbyshire Wildlife Trust)
- Duke of York Meadow (Worcestershire Wildlife Trust)
- Duke's Covert & Copper Hill (Lincolnshire Wildlife Trust)
- Dukes Wood Nature Reserve (Nottinghamshire Wildlife Trust)
- Dumbarnie Links (Scottish Wildlife Trust)
- Dundon Beacon (Somerset Wildlife Trust)
- Duns Castle (Scottish Wildlife Trust)
- Dunsdon National Nature Reserve (Devon Wildlife Trust)
- Dunsford (Devon Wildlife Trust)
- Dunwich Forest (Suffolk Wildlife Trust)
- Dutton Farm Park (Cheshire Wildlife Trust)
- Dyfnant Meadows (Montgomeryshire Wildlife Trust)
- Dyscarr Wood (Nottinghamshire Wildlife Trust)

== E ==
- Eaglehead and Bloodstone Copses (Hampshire & IOW Wildlife Trust)
- Eakring Meadow (Nottinghamshire Wildlife Trust)
- Earl's Hill (Shropshire Wildlife Trust)
- Earlswood Moathouse (Warwickshire Wildlife Trust)
- Earystane (Manx Wildlife Trust)
- East Blean Wood NNR (Kent Wildlife Trust)
- East Chevington (Northumberland Wildlife Trust)
- East Cramlington Pond (Northumberland Wildlife Trust)
- East Crindledykes Quarry (Northumberland Wildlife Trust)
- East Lammermuir Deans (Scottish Wildlife Trust)
- East Reservoir Community Garden (London Wildlife Trust)
- East Stoke Fen (Dorset Wildlife Trust)
- East Winch Common (Norfolk Wildlife Trust)
- East Wood (Gloucestershire Wildlife Trust)
- East Wretham Heath (Norfolk Wildlife Trust)
- Eastfield Road Railway Embankment (Lincolnshire Wildlife Trust)
- Eastwood Nature Reserve (Cheshire Wildlife Trust)
- Eathorpe Marsh (Warwickshire Wildlife Trust)
- Eaton & Gamston Woods (Nottinghamshire Wildlife Trust)
- Ebernoe Common (Sussex Wildlife Trust)
- Echo Lodge Meadows (Wiltshire Wildlife Trust)
- ECOS (Ulster Wildlife Trust)
- Edford Meadows (Somerset Wildlife Trust)
- Edford Wood (Somerset Wildlife Trust)
- Edgehills Bog (Gloucestershire Wildlife Trust)
- Edmondsley Wood (Durham Wildlife Trust)
- Edward Richardson & Phyllis Amey (Gloucestershire Wildlife Trust)
- Elizabeth & Rowe Harding Reserve (The Wildlife Trust for South & West Wales)
- Ellerburn Bank Nature Reserve (Yorkshire Wildlife Trust)
- Elliott (Swift's Hill) (Gloucestershire Wildlife Trust)
- Elmdon Manor (Warwickshire Wildlife Trust)
- Emer Bog and Baddesley Common (Hampshire & IOW Wildlife Trust)
- Emmett Hill Meadows (Wiltshire Wildlife Trust)
- Emsworthy mire (Devon Wildlife Trust)
- Epworth Turbary (Lincolnshire Wildlife Trust)
- Erewash Meadows (Derbyshire Wildlife Trust)
- Erewash Meadows (Nottinghamshire Wildlife Trust)
- Eridge Rocks (Sussex Wildlife Trust)
- Ernle Gilbert Meadow (Herefordshire Nature Trust)
- Erraid Wood (Scottish Wildlife Trust)
- Eskmeals Dunes Nature Reserve (Cumbria Wildlife Trust)
- Evelyn Howick Memorial, Littlemill (Northumberland Wildlife Trust)
- Ewerby Pond (Lincolnshire Wildlife Trust)
- Exe Reed Beds (Devon Wildlife Trust)
- Exeter Valley Parks (Devon Wildlife Trust)
- Eye Green Brick Pit (The Wildlife Trust for Bedfordshire, Cambridgeshire and Northamptonshire)

== F ==
- Fackenden Down (Kent Wildlife Trust)
- Fairfield Pit (Lincolnshire Wildlife Trust)
- Fairham Brook (Nottinghamshire Wildlife Trust)
- Far Ings National Nature Reserve (Lincolnshire Wildlife Trust)
- Farthinghoe (The Wildlife Trust for Bedfordshire, Cambridgeshire and Northamptonshire)
- Finedon Cally Banks (The Wildlife Trust for Bedfordshire, Cambridgeshire and Northamptonshire)
- Fir and Pond Woods (Herts and Middlesex Wildlife Trust)
- Fir Hill Quarry (Lincolnshire Wildlife Trust)
- Fiskerton Fen (Lincolnshire Wildlife Trust)
- Fleetwood Marsh (The Wildlife Trust for Lancashire, Manchester & north Merseyside)
- Flexford (Hampshire & IOW Wildlife Trust)
- Flitwick Moor (& Folly Wood) (The Wildlife Trust for Bedfordshire, Cambridgeshire and Northamptonshire)
- Flodden Quarry (Northumberland Wildlife Trust)
- Fobbing Marsh (Essex Wildlife Trust)
- Folly Farm (Avon Wildlife Trust)
- Fontburn (Northumberland Wildlife Trust)
- Fontmell Down (Dorset Wildlife Trust)
- Ford Moss (Northumberland Wildlife Trust)
- Fordham Woods (The Wildlife Trust for Bedfordshire, Cambridgeshire and Northamptonshire)
- Forest Wood (Scottish Wildlife Trust)
- Foster's Green Meadows (Worcestershire Wildlife Trust)
- Foulney Island Nature Reserve (Cumbria Wildlife Trust)
- Foulshaw Moss (Cumbria Wildlife Trust)
- Fountainbleau Ladypark (Scottish Wildlife Trust)
- Fowls Copse (Surrey Wildlife Trust)
- Fox Corner (Cornwall Wildlife Trust)
- Fox Covert (Herts & Middlesex Wildlife Trust)
- Fox Fritillary Meadow (Suffolk Wildlife Trust)
- Fox Hagg (Sheffield Wildlife Trust)
- Fox Wood (London Wildlife Trust)
- Foxburrow Farm (Suffolk Wildlife Trust)
- Foxcovert Plantation (Nottinghamshire Wildlife Trust)
- Foxes Bridge Bog (Gloucestershire Wildlife Trust)
- Foxes Wood (Cheshire Wildlife Trust)
- Foxhill Bank Local Nature Reserve (The Wildlife Trust for Lancashire, Manchester & north Merseyside)
- Foxholes (Berks, Bucks & Oxon Wildlife Trust)
- Foxlease Meadows (Hampshire & IOW Wildlife Trust)
- Foxley Wood (Norfolk Wildlife Trust)
- Frampton Marsh (Lincolnshire Wildlife Trust)
- Fraser Down (Surrey Wildlife Trust)
- Fray's Farm Meadows (London Wildlife Trust)
- Fray's Island and Mabey's Meadow (London Wildlife Trust)
- Freemans Pasture Local Nature Reserve (The Wildlife Trust for Lancashire, Manchester & north Merseyside)
- Freeman's Pools (The Wildlife Trust for Lancashire, Manchester & north Merseyside)
- Freshfield Dune Heath (The Wildlife Trust for Lancashire, Manchester & north Merseyside)
- Friskney Decoy Wood (Lincolnshire Wildlife Trust)
- Frith Wood (Gloucestershire Wildlife Trust)
- Frodsham Field Studies Centre (Cheshire Wildlife Trust)
- Frogmore Meadow (Herts & Middlesex Wildlife Trust)
- Frome Banks (Gloucestershire Wildlife Trust)
- Fulbourn Fen (The Wildlife Trust for Bedfordshire, Cambridgeshire and Northamptonshire)
- Furze Hill (Lincolnshire Wildlife Trust)

== G ==
- Gailes Marsh (Scottish Wildlife Trust)
- Gamlingay Cinques and Meadow (The Wildlife Trust for Bedfordshire, Cambridgeshire and Northamptonshire)
- Gamlingay Wood (The Wildlife Trust for Bedfordshire, Cambridgeshire and Northamptonshire)
- Gamsey Wood (The Wildlife Trust for Bedfordshire, Cambridgeshire and Northamptonshire)
- Gang Mine (Derbyshire Wildlife Trust)
- Garbutt Wood Nature Reserve (Yorkshire Wildlife Trust)
- Garne Turn Rocks (The Wildlife Trust for South & West Wales)
- Garnock Floods (Scottish Wildlife Trust)
- Garrion Gill (Scottish Wildlife Trust)
- GB Gruffy (Somerset Wildlife Trust)
- Gelli Hir (The Wildlife Trust for South & West Wales)
- George's Hayes (Staffordshire Wildlife Trust)
- Gernon Bushes (Essex Wildlife Trust)
- Gibraltar Point National Nature Reserve (Lincolnshire Wildlife Trust)
- Gight Wood (Scottish Wildlife Trust)
- Gilfach Farm (Radnorshire Wildlife Trust)
- Gillham Wood (Sussex Wildlife Trust)
- Gilling Down (Somerset Wildlife Trust)
- Girdlers Coppice (Dorset Wildlife Trust)
- Glapthorn Cow Pastures (The Wildlife Trust for Bedfordshire, Cambridgeshire and Northamptonshire)
- Glapton Wood (Nottinghamshire Wildlife Trust)
- Glasbury Cutting (Brecknock Wildlife Trust)
- Glaslyn (Montgomeryshire Wildlife Trust)
- Glasshouse Spinney (Warwickshire Wildlife Trust)
- Glen Dhoo (Manx Wildlife Trust)
- Glen Moss (Scottish Wildlife Trust)
- Glenarm (Ulster Wildlife Trust)
- Glendun Farm (Ulster Wildlife Trust)
- Globe Flower Wood Nature Reserve (Yorkshire Wildlife Trust)
- Glory Wood (Surrey Wildlife Trust)
- Glyme Valley (Berks, Bucks & Oxon Wildlife Trust)
- Gobions Wood (Herts & Middlesex Wildlife Trust)
- Goblin Combe (Avon Wildlife Trust)
- Gogarth (North Wales Wildlife Trust)
- Golden Brook Storage Lagoon (Derbyshire Wildlife Trust)
- Goldicote Cutting (Warwickshire Wildlife Trust)
- Gomm Valley (Berks, Bucks & Oxon Wildlife Trust)
- Goodwick Moor (The Wildlife Trust for South & West Wales)
- Goose's Nest Bluebell Bank (Northumberland Wildlife Trust)
- Gordon Moss (Scottish Wildlife Trust)
- Gors Maen Llwyd (North Wales Wildlife Trust)
- Gorse Farm (Radnorshire Wildlife Trust)
- Gosling Sike Farm (Cumbria Wildlife Trust)
- Goslings Corner Wood (Lincolnshire Wildlife Trust)
- Gowy Meadows (Cheshire Wildlife Trust)
- Gracious Pond (Surrey Wildlife Trust)
- Graeme Hendrey Wood (Surrey Wildlife Trust)
- Graffham Common (Sussex Wildlife Trust)
- Grafham Water (The Wildlife Trust for Bedfordshire, Cambridgeshire and Northamptonshire)
- Grafton Wood (Worcestershire Wildlife Trust)
- Graig Wood (Gwent Wildlife Trust)
- Granville Nature Reserve and Country Park (Shropshire Wildlife Trust)
- Grass Wood Nature Reserve (Yorkshire Wildlife Trust)
- Grasslees Burn Wood (Northumberland Wildlife Trust)
- Gravel Hole (Tees Valley Wildlife Trust)
- Great Breach Wood (Somerset Wildlife Trust)
- Great Casterton Road Banks (Lincolnshire Wildlife Trust)
- Great Fen (The Wildlife Trust for Bedfordshire, Cambridgeshire and Northamptonshire)
- Great Holland pits (Essex Wildlife Trust)
- Great Merrible Wood (Leicestershire & Rutland Wildlife Trust)
- Great Oakley Meadow (The Wildlife Trust for Bedfordshire, Cambridgeshire and Northamptonshire)
- Great Wood (Wiltshire Wildlife Trust)
- Green Down (Somerset Wildlife Trust)
- Green Lane Wood (Wiltshire Wildlife Trust)
- Greena Moor (Creddacott Meadows) (Cornwall Wildlife Trust)
- Greenfields (Shropshire Wildlife Trust)
- Greenhill Down (Dorset Wildlife Trust)
- Greenlee Lough (Northumberland Wildlife Trust)
- Greetwell Hollow (Lincolnshire Wildlife Trust)
- Greno Woods (Sheffield Wildlife Trust)
- Greville Place Reserve (London Wildlife Trust)
- Grey Hill Grassland (Scottish Wildlife Trust)
- Greylynch (Somerset Wildlife Trust)
- Greystones Farm (Gloucestershire Wildlife Trust)
- Greywell Moors (Hampshire & IOW Wildlife Trust)
- Grimley Brick Pits (Worcestershire Wildlife Trust)
- Grimston Warren (Norfolk Wildlife Trust)
- Grindon Lough (Northumberland Wildlife Trust)
- Groton Wood (Suffolk Wildlife Trust)
- Grove Farm (Suffolk Wildlife Trust)
- Grove Hill (Warwickshire Wildlife Trust)
- Grovely Dingle (Worcestershire Wildlife Trust)
- Grubbins Wood Nature Reserve (Cumbria Wildlife Trust)
- Gun Moor (Staffordshire Wildlife Trust)
- Gunnersbury Triangle Nature Reserve (London Wildlife Trust)
- Gunton Meadow (Suffolk Wildlife Trust)
- Gutteridge Wood (London Wildlife Trust)
- Gwaith Powdwr (North Wales Wildlife Trust)
- Gwen and Vera's Fields (Gloucestershire Wildlife Trust)

== H ==
- Hackhurst Downs (Surrey Wildlife Trust)
- Hadfast Valley (Scottish Wildlife Trust)
- Hadfields Quarry (Derbyshire Wildlife Trust)
- Hagbourne Copse (Wiltshire Wildlife Trust)
- Halbullock Moor (Cornwall Wildlife Trust)
- Hale Moss Nature Reserve (Cumbria Wildlife Trust)
- Halsdon (Devon Wildlife Trust)
- Halwill Junction (Devon Wildlife Trust)
- Ham Fen (Kent Wildlife Trust)
- Ham Hill (Wiltshire Wildlife Trust)
- Hambury Wood (The Wildlife Trust for South & West Wales)
- Hammond's Field Redmires Nature Reserve (Yorkshire Wildlife Trust)
- Hampton Meadow (Herefordshire Nature Trust)
- Hampton Wood & Meadow (Warwickshire Wildlife Trust)
- Handa Island (Scottish Wildlife Trust)
- Hanley Dingle (Worcestershire Wildlife Trust)
- Hannah's Meadow (Durham Wildlife Trust)
- Hanningfield Reservoir (Essex Wildlife Trust)
- Harbottle Crags (Northumberland Wildlife Trust)
- Harbury Spoilbank (Warwickshire Wildlife Trust)
- Hardwick Dene & Elm Tree Wood (Tees Valley Wildlife Trust)
- Hardwick Wood (The Wildlife Trust for Bedfordshire, Cambridgeshire and Northamptonshire)
- Hare and Dunhog Mosses (Scottish Wildlife Trust)
- Harland Mount Nature Reserve (Yorkshire Wildlife Trust)
- Harlestone Heath (The Wildlife Trust for Bedfordshire, Cambridgeshire and Northamptonshire)
- Harridge Wood (Somerset Wildlife Trust)
- Harrisons Plantation Nature Reserve (Nottinghamshire Wildlife Trust)
- Harston Wood (Staffordshire Wildlife Trust)
- Hartington Meadows (Derbyshire Wildlife Trust)
- Harton Hollow (Shropshire Wildlife Trust)
- Hartslock (Berks, Bucks & Oxon Wildlife Trust)
- Harvest Hill (Warwickshire Wildlife Trust)
- Haskayne Cutting Nature Reserve (The Wildlife Trust for Lancashire, Manchester & north Merseyside)
- Hatch Mere (Cheshire Wildlife Trust)
- Hatton Meadows (Lincolnshire Wildlife Trust)
- Hauxley (Northumberland Wildlife Trust)
- Hawkes Wood (Cornwall Wildlife Trust)
- Hawkins Wood (Herts & Middlesex Wildlife Trust)
- Hawkswood (Devon Wildlife Trust)
- Hawthorn Dene (Durham Wildlife Trust)
- Haxey Turbary (Lincolnshire Wildlife Trust)
- Haydon Hill (Dorset Wildlife Trust)
- Hayley Wood (The Wildlife Trust for Bedfordshire, Cambridgeshire and Northamptonshire)
- Haymill Valley (Berks, Bucks & Oxon Wildlife Trust)
- Hazlewood Marshes (Suffolk Wildlife Trust)
- Headley Gravel Pit (Hampshire & IOW Wildlife Trust)
- Heath's Meadows (Lincolnshire Wildlife Trust)
- Hedgecourt (Surrey Wildlife Trust)
- Hedleyhope Fell (Durham Wildlife Trust)
- Hellenge Hill (Avon Wildlife Trust)
- Helman Tor (Cornwall Wildlife Trust)
- Hem Heath Woods (Staffordshire Wildlife Trust)
- Hen Reedbed (Suffolk Wildlife Trust)
- Hendover Coppice (Dorset Wildlife Trust)
- Henley Sidings (Warwickshire Wildlife Trust)
- Henllys Bog SSSI (Alderney Wildlife Trust)
- Henllys Bog SSSI (Gwent Wildlife Trust)
- Hermand Birchwood (Scottish Wildlife Trust)
- Hertford Heath (Herts & Middlesex Wildlife Trust)
- Hesleden Dene (Durham Wildlife Trust)
- Hetchell Wood Nature Reserve (Yorkshire Wildlife Trust)
- Hethel Old Thorn (Norfolk Wildlife Trust)
- Hewitt's Chalk Bank (Kent Wildlife Trust)
- Hexton Chalk Pit (Herts & Middlesex Wildlife Trust)
- Heysham Moss (The Wildlife Trust for Lancashire, Manchester & north Merseyside)
- Heysham Nature Reserve (The Wildlife Trust for Lancashire, Manchester & north Merseyside)
- Hibbitt Woods (Dorset Wildlife Trust)
- Hickling Broad (Norfolk Wildlife Trust)
- High Clear Down (Wiltshire Wildlife Trust)
- High Wood (Durham Wildlife Trust)
- High Wood and Meadow (The Wildlife Trust for Bedfordshire, Cambridgeshire and Northamptonshire)
- Higham Ferrers Pits (The Wildlife Trust for Bedfordshire, Cambridgeshire and Northamptonshire)
- Higher Hyde Heath (Dorset Wildlife Trust)
- Higher Kiln Quarry (Devon Wildlife Trust)
- Highfield Moss (The Wildlife Trust for Lancashire, Manchester & north Merseyside)
- Highgate Common (Staffordshire Wildlife Trust)
- Hilfield Park Reservoir (Herts & Middlesex Wildlife Trust)
- Hill Court Farm & The Blacklands (Worcestershire Wildlife Trust)
- Hill End Pit (Herts & Middlesex Wildlife Trust)
- Hill Hook (The Wildlife Trust for Birmingham and the Black Country)
- Hill of White Hamars (Scottish Wildlife Trust)
- Hill Park (Surrey Wildlife Trust)
- Hillbridge and Park Wood (Derbyshire Wildlife Trust)
- Hilton Gravel Pits (Derbyshire Wildlife Trust)
- Hitchcopse Pit (Berks, Bucks & Oxon Wildlife Trust)
- Hobbs Quarry (Gloucestershire Wildlife Trust)
- Hobnole Bank (Lincolnshire Wildlife Trust)
- Hockenhull Platts (Cheshire Wildlife Trust)
- Hodgson's Fields Nature Reserve (Yorkshire Wildlife Trust)
- Hoe Rough (Norfolk Wildlife Trust)
- Hogswood Covert (Cheshire Wildlife Trust)
- Holborough Marshes (Kent Wildlife Trust)
- Holburn Moss (Northumberland Wildlife Trust)
- Holcroft Moss (Cheshire Wildlife Trust)
- Holford Ketling (Somerset Wildlife Trust)
- Hollinhill and Markland Grips (Derbyshire Wildlife Trust)
- Hollow Marsh Meadow (Somerset Wildlife Trust)
- Holly Banks (Shropshire Wildlife Trust)
- Holly Wood (Derbyshire Wildlife Trust)
- Hollybed Farm Meadows (Worcestershire Wildlife Trust)
- Holme Dunes (Norfolk Wildlife Trust)
- Holway Woods (Dorset Wildlife Trust)
- Holwell Mineral Line (Leicestershire & Rutland Wildlife Trust)
- Holystone Burn (Northumberland Wildlife Trust)
- Holystone North Wood (Northumberland Wildlife Trust)
- Holywell Dingle (Herefordshire Nature Trust)
- Holywell Pond (Northumberland Wildlife Trust)
- Homefield Wood (Berks, Bucks & Oxon Wildlife Trust)
- Honeypot Wood (Norfolk Wildlife Trust)
- Hookheath Meadows (Hampshire & IOW Wildlife Trust)
- Hook Norton Cutting (Berks, Bucks & Oxon Wildlife Trust)
- Hope Valley (Shropshire Wildlife Trust)
- Hoplands Wood (Lincolnshire Wildlife Trust)
- Hopton Fen (Suffolk Wildlife Trust)
- Hopton Quarry (Derbyshire Wildlife Trust)
- Hopyard Haymeadow Nature Reserve (Yorkshire Wildlife Trust)
- Horbling Line (Lincolnshire Wildlife Trust)
- Horndon Meadow (Essex Wildlife Trust)
- Hornhill Wood (Worcestershire Wildlife Trust)
- Horsehill Coppice (Somerset Wildlife Trust)
- Hoselaw Loch and Din Moss (Scottish Wildlife Trust)
- Hothfield Heathlands (Kent Wildlife Trust)
- Houghton Meadows (The Wildlife Trust for Bedfordshire, Cambridgeshire and Northamptonshire)
- Howell Hill (Surrey Wildlife Trust)
- Huish Moor (Somerset Wildlife Trust)
- Hummersea (Tees Valley Wildlife Trust)
- Humphrey Head Nature Reserve (Cumbria Wildlife Trust)
- Humpy Meadow (Worcestershire Wildlife Trust)
- Hungerford Marsh (Berks, Bucks & Oxon Wildlife Trust)
- Hunningham Meadow (Warwickshire Wildlife Trust)
- Hunsdon and Eastwick Meads (Herts & Middlesex Wildlife Trust)
- Hunsdon Mead (Essex Wildlife Trust)
- Hunt Cliff (Tees Valley Wildlife Trust)
- Hunter's Wood (Cheshire Wildlife Trust)
- Hunthouse Wood (Worcestershire Wildlife Trust)
- Hunt's Meadow (Nottinghamshire Wildlife Trust)
- Hurley Chalk Pit (Berks, Bucks & Oxon Wildlife Trust)
- Hutchinson's Bank Nature Reserve (London Wildlife Trust)
- Hutchinson's Meadow (Suffolk Wildlife Trust)
- Huttoft Bank Pit (Lincolnshire Wildlife Trust)
- Hutton Roof Crags National Nature Reserve (Cumbria Wildlife Trust)
- Hythe Spartina Marsh (Hampshire & IOW Wildlife Trust)

== I ==
- Ickenham Manor Moat (London Wildlife Trust)
- Ickenham Marsh (London Wildlife Trust)
- Idle Valley (Nottinghamshire Wildlife Trust)
- Iffley Meadows (Berks, Bucks & Oxon Wildlife Trust)
- Inholms Claypit (Surrey Wildlife Trust)
- Inishargy Bog (Ulster Wildlife Trust)
- Inishcreagh (Ulster Wildlife Trust)
- Inkpen Common (Berks, Bucks & Oxon Wildlife Trust)
- Inkpen Crocus Fields (Berks, Bucks & Oxon Wildlife Trust)
- Intake Wood (Cheshire Wildlife Trust)
- Iping and Stedham Commons (Sussex Wildlife Trust)
- Ipsley Alders Marsh (Worcestershire Wildlife Trust)
- Ipstones Edge (Staffordshire Wildlife Trust)
- Iron Latch (Essex Wildlife Trust)
- Irthlingborough Lakes and Meadows (The Wildlife Trust for Bedfordshire, Cambridgeshire and Northamptonshire)
- Isle Namanfin (Ulster Wildlife Trust)
- Isle of Eigg (Scottish Wildlife Trust)
- Isle of Muck (Ulster Wildlife Trust)
- Isles of Scilly (Isles of Scilly Wildlife Trust)
- Isleworth Ait (London Wildlife Trust)
- Ivy Crag Wood (Cumbria Wildlife Trust)
- Ivy Hatch (Kent Wildlife Trust)

== J ==
- Jacksdale (Nottinghamshire Wildlife Trust)
- Jackson's Coppice & Marsh (Staffordshire Wildlife Trust)
- Jan Hobbs (Somerset Wildlife Trust)
- Jeffry Bog Nature Reserve (Yorkshire Wildlife Trust)
- Joe's Pond (Durham Wildlife Trust)
- John Weston (Essex Wildlife Trust)
- Johnston Terrace Garden (Scottish Wildlife Trust)
- Jones' Rough (Shropshire Wildlife Trust)
- Jones's Mill (Wiltshire Wildlife Trust)
- Juliet's Wood (Northumberland Wildlife Trust)
- Jupiter Urban Wildlife Centre (Scottish Wildlife Trust)

== K ==
- Keal Carr (Lincolnshire Wildlife Trust)
- Keldmarsh Nature Reserve (Yorkshire Wildlife Trust)
- Kelham Bridge (Leicestershire & Rutland Wildlife Trust)
- Keltneyburn (Scottish Wildlife Trust)
- Kemsing Down (Kent Wildlife Trust)
- Kemyel Crease (Cornwall Wildlife Trust)
- Kenilworth Common (Warwickshire Wildlife Trust)
- Kennall Vale (Cornwall Wildlife Trust)
- Ketford Banks (Gloucestershire Wildlife Trust)
- Ketton Quarry (Leicestershire & Rutland Wildlife Trust)
- Lymington and Keyhaven Marshes (Hampshire & IOW Wildlife Trust)
- Killay Marsh (The Wildlife Trust for South & West Wales)
- Killingholme Haven Pits (Lincolnshire Wildlife Trust)
- Killwood Coppice and Meadows (Dorset Wildlife Trust)
- Kilminning Coast (Scottish Wildlife Trust)
- Kiln Wood (Kent Wildlife Trust)
- Kilvrough Manor Woods & Redden Hill (The Wildlife Trust for South & West Wales)
- Kimberley Cutting (Nottinghamshire Wildlife Trust)
- King Arthur's Cave (Herefordshire Nature Trust)
- King Barrow Quarry (Dorset Wildlife Trust)
- Kingcombe Meadows (Dorset Wildlife Trust)
- Kingerby Beck Meadows (Lincolnshire Wildlife Trust)
- King's Castle Wood (Somerset Wildlife Trust)
- Kings Hill Gully (Somerset Wildlife Trust)
- Kings Lane Community Orchard (Dorset Wildlife Trust)
- King's Meadow (Nottinghamshire Wildlife Trust)
- King's Meads (Herts & Middlesex Wildlife Trust)
- King's Wood (The Wildlife Trust for Bedfordshire, Cambridgeshire and Northamptonshire)
- King's Wood and Rammamere Heath (The Wildlife Trust for Bedfordshire, Cambridgeshire and Northamptonshire)
- Kingsthorpe Meadow (The Wildlife Trust for Bedfordshire, Cambridgeshire and Northamptonshire)
- Kingsway (Herefordshire Nature Trust)
- Kintbury Newt Ponds (Berks, Bucks & Oxon Wildlife Trust)
- Kiplingcotes Nature Reserve (Yorkshire Wildlife Trust)
- Kippax Meadows (Yorkshire Wildlife Trust)
- Kirkby Gravel Pit (Lincolnshire Wildlife Trust)
- Kirkby Moor (Lincolnshire Wildlife Trust)
- Kirkstall Valley Nature Reserve (Yorkshire Wildlife Trust)
- Kirton Wood (Nottinghamshire Wildlife Trust)
- Kitchen Copse (Surrey Wildlife Trust)
- Kitty's Orchard (Gwent Wildlife Trust)
- Knapp and Papermill (Worcestershire Wildlife Trust)
- Knapdale Habitats Partnership Area (Scottish Wildlife Trust)
- Knettishall Heath (Suffolk Wildlife Trust)
- Knockshinnoch Lagoons (Scottish Wildlife Trust)
- Knowetop Lochs (Scottish Wildlife Trust)
- Knowle Hill (Warwickshire Wildlife Trust)
- Knowles Coppice (Worcestershire Wildlife Trust)
- Knutsford Heath (Cheshire Wildlife Trust)
- Knutsford Moor (Cheshire Wildlife Trust)

== L ==
- Lackford Lakes (Suffolk Wildlife Trust)
- Lady Lee Quarry (Nottinghamshire Wildlife Trust)
- Ladybower Wood (Derbyshire Wildlife Trust)
- Lady's Wood (Devon Wildlife Trust)
- Lady's Wood (The Wildlife Trust for Bedfordshire, Cambridgeshire and Northamptonshire)
- Laight Rough (Worcestershire Wildlife Trust)
- Lamb's Pool (Berks, Bucks & Oxon Wildlife Trust)
- Lancaut (Gloucestershire Wildlife Trust)
- Lancot Meadow (The Wildlife Trust for Bedfordshire, Cambridgeshire and Northamptonshire)
- Landford Bog (Wiltshire Wildlife Trust)
- Landpark wood (The Wildlife Trust for Bedfordshire, Cambridgeshire and Northamptonshire)
- Langdon Nature Reserve (Essex Wildlife Trust)
- Langford Heathfield (Somerset Wildlife Trust)
- Langford Lakes (Wiltshire Wildlife Trust)
- Langholme Wood (Lincolnshire Wildlife Trust)
- Lanvean Bottoms (Cornwall Wildlife Trust)
- Largiebaan (Scottish Wildlife Trust)
- Lashford Lane Fen (Berks, Bucks & Oxon Wildlife Trust)
- Latterbarrow Nature Reserve (Cumbria Wildlife Trust)
- Lattersey (The Wildlife Trust for Bedfordshire, Cambridgeshire and Northamptonshire)
- Launde Big Wood (Leicestershire & Rutland Wildlife Trust)
- Launde Park Wood (Leicestershire & Rutland Wildlife Trust)
- Lavernock (The Wildlife Trust for South & West Wales)
- Lawn Wood and Meadows (Lincolnshire Wildlife Trust)
- Lawrence Weston Moor (Avon Wildlife Trust)
- Lawthorn Wood (Scottish Wildlife Trust)
- Laymoor Quag (Gloucestershire Wildlife Trust)
- Lea & Paget's Wood (Alderney Wildlife Trust)
- Lea Meadows (Leicestershire & Rutland Wildlife Trust)
- Lea Wood (Derbyshire Wildlife Trust)
- Leam Valley (Warwickshire Wildlife Trust)
- Ledgers Wood (Surrey Wildlife Trust)
- Ledston Luck (Yorkshire Wildlife Trust)
- Leeping Stocks (Herefordshire Nature Trust)
- Legbourne Wood (Lincolnshire Wildlife Trust)
- Lemsford Springs (Herts & Middlesex Wildlife Trust)
- Letchmire Pastures (Yorkshire Wildlife Trust)
- Letcombe Valley (Berks, Bucks & Oxon Wildlife Trust)
- Levin Down (Sussex Wildlife Trust)
- Levington Lagoon (Suffolk Wildlife Trust)
- Lexden Gathering Grounds (Essex Wildlife Trust)
- Leyburn Old Glebe Nature Reserve (Yorkshire Wildlife Trust)
- Leythorne Meadow (Sussex Wildlife Trust)
- Lickham Common (Devon Wildlife Trust)
- Lielowan Meadow (Scottish Wildlife Trust)
- Limekiln Wood (Cheshire Wildlife Trust)
- Lings (The Wildlife Trust for Bedfordshire, Cambridgeshire and Northamptonshire)
- Linhouse Glen (Scottish Wildlife Trust)
- Linn Dean (Scottish Wildlife Trust)
- Linton Lane (Northumberland Wildlife Trust)
- Linwood (Hampshire & IOW Wildlife Trust)
- Linwood Warren (Lincolnshire Wildlife Trust)
- Lion Creek and Lower Raypits (Essex Wildlife Trust)
- Lion Wood (Warwickshire Wildlife Trust)
- Lion Wood (Worcestershire Wildlife Trust)
- Lippets Grove (Gloucestershire Wildlife Trust)
- Little Beck Wood Nature Reserve (Yorkshire Wildlife Trust)
- Little Bradley Ponds (Devon Wildlife Trust)
- Little Harle Pasture (Northumberland Wildlife Trust)
- Little Haven (Essex Wildlife Trust)
- Little Langford Down (Wiltshire Wildlife Trust)
- Little Linford Wood (Berks, Bucks & Oxon Wildlife Trust)
- Little Waltham Meadows (Essex Wildlife Trust)
- Littlefield Common (Surrey Wildlife Trust)
- Littleton Brick Pits (Avon Wildlife Trust)
- Llanbwchllyn Lake (Radnorshire Wildlife Trust)
- Llandefaelog Wood (Brecknock Wildlife Trust)
- Llandinam Gravels (Montgomeryshire Wildlife Trust)
- Llanerch Alder Carr (The Wildlife Trust for South & West Wales
- Llangloffan Fen (The Wildlife Trust for South & West Wales)
- Llanmerewig Glebe (Montgomeryshire Wildlife Trust)
- Llannerch Alder Carr (The Wildlife Trust for South & West Wales)
- Llanrhidian Hill (The Wildlife Trust for South & West Wales)
- Llanymynech Rocks (Montgomeryshire Wildlife Trust)
- Llanymynech Rocks (Shropshire Wildlife Trust)
- Llyn Coed y Dinas (Montgomeryshire Wildlife Trust)
- Llyn Eiddwen (The Wildlife Trust for South & West Wales)
- Llyn Fanod (The Wildlife Trust for South & West Wales)
- Llyn Mawr (Montgomeryshire Wildlife Trust)
- Llynclys Common (Shropshire Wildlife Trust)
- Loch Ardinning (Scottish Wildlife Trust)
- Loch Fleet (Scottish Wildlife Trust)
- Loch Libo (Scottish Wildlife Trust)
- Loch of Lintrathen (Scottish Wildlife Trust)
- Loch of the Lowes (Scottish Wildlife Trust)
- Lock Lane Ash Tip (Derbyshire Wildlife Trust)
- Lockley Lodge Visitor Centre (The Wildlife Trust for South & West Wales)
- Loddon Nature Reserve (Berks, Bucks & Oxon Wildlife Trust)
- Loggan's Moor (Cornwall Wildlife Trust)
- Lolly Moor (Norfolk Wildlife Trust)
- Long Clough (Derbyshire Wildlife Trust)
- Long Deans (Herts & Middlesex Wildlife Trust)
- Long Grove Wood (Berks, Bucks & Oxon Wildlife Trust)
- Long Hole Cliff (The Wildlife Trust for South & West Wales)
- Long Meadow (Worcestershire Wildlife Trust)
- Longburnford Quarry (Durham Wildlife Trust)
- Longfield Chalk Bank (Kent Wildlife Trust)
- Longhaven Cliffs (Scottish Wildlife Trust)
- Longis (Alderney Wildlife Trust)
- Longridge Moss (Scottish Wildlife Trust)
- Longspring Wood (Herts & Middlesex Wildlife Trust)
- Longworth Clough Nature Reserve (The Wildlife Trust for Lancashire, Manchester & north Merseyside)
- Lord's Lot Bog (The Wildlife Trust for Lancashire, Manchester & north Merseyside)
- Lord's Wood Quarry (Herefordshire Nature Trust)
- Lorton Meadows (Dorset Wildlife Trust)
- Loscombe (Dorset Wildlife Trust)
- Lots Grassland (Mendip) (Somerset Wildlife Trust)
- Loughborough Big Meadow (Leicestershire & Rutland Wildlife Trust)
- Loveny/Colliford (Cornwall Wildlife Trust)
- Low Barns (Durham Wildlife Trust)
- Low Wood Nature Reserve (Yorkshire Wildlife Trust)
- Lower East Lounston (Devon Wildlife Trust)
- Lower House Farm (Trust Headquarters) (Herefordshire Nature Trust)
- Lower Lewdon (Cornwall Wildlife Trust)
- Lower Minnetts Field (Gwent Wildlife Trust)
- Lower Moor Farm (Wiltshire Wildlife Trust)
- Lower Nethan Gorge (Scottish Wildlife Trust)
- Lower Shortditch Turbary (Shropshire Wildlife Trust)
- Lower Smite Farm (Worcestershire Wildlife Trust)
- Lower Test (Hampshire & IOW Wildlife Trust)
- Lower Wood (Herefordshire Nature Trust)
- Lower Wood (The Wildlife Trust for Bedfordshire, Cambridgeshire and Northamptonshire)
- Lower Wood, Ashwellthorpe (Norfolk Wildlife Trust)
- Lower Woods (Gloucestershire Wildlife Trust)
- Loxley Church Meadow (Warwickshire Wildlife Trust)
- Loynton Moss (Staffordshire Wildlife Trust)
- Lucas' Marsh Nature Reserve (Leicestershire & Rutland Wildlife Trust)
- Luckett (Cornwall Wildlife Trust)
- Ludwell Valley Park (Devon Wildlife Trust)
- Lugg Meadow (Herefordshire Nature Trust)
- Lugg Mills (Herefordshire Nature Trust)
- Luggiebank Wood (Scottish Wildlife Trust)~
- Lurkenhope (Shropshire Wildlife Trust)
- Lydden Temple Ewell - The James Teacher Reserve (Kent Wildlife Trust)
- Lymington Reedbeds (Hampshire & IOW Wildlife Trust)

== M ==
- Maer Lake (Cornwall Wildlife Trust)
- Maes Hiraddug (North Wales Wildlife Trust)
- Magor Marsh SSSI (Gwent Wildlife Trust)
- Maldon Wick (Essex Wildlife Trust)
- Malling Down (Sussex Wildlife Trust)
- Maltby Low Common Nature Reserve (Yorkshire Wildlife Trust)
- Malton (Durham Wildlife Trust)
- Mambury Moor (Devon Wildlife Trust)
- Manor Farm (Surrey Wildlife Trust)
- Mansey Common (Nottinghamshire Wildlife Trust)
- Mapledurwell Fen/The Hatch (Hampshire & IOW Wildlife Trust)
- Mapperley Wood (Derbyshire Wildlife Trust)
- Marbury Reedbed (Cheshire Wildlife Trust)
- Marden Meadow (Kent Wildlife Trust)
- Marehill Quarry (Sussex Wildlife Trust)
- Marford Quarry (North Wales Wildlife Trust)
- Margaret's Wood (Gwent Wildlife Trust)
- Margrove Ponds (Tees Valley Wildlife Trust)
- Mariandyrys (North Wales Wildlife Trust)
- Market Weston Fen (Suffolk Wildlife Trust)
- Martlesham Wilds (Suffolk Wildlife Trust)
- Marline Valley (Sussex Wildlife Trust)
- Marshlands Meadow (Worcestershire Wildlife Trust)
- Marsland (Devon Wildlife Trust)
- Marsland Valley (Cornwall Wildlife Trust)
- Martham Broad National Nature Reserve (Norfolk Wildlife Trust)
- Martin's Meadow (Suffolk Wildlife Trust)
- Mascall's Wood (Mendips) (Somerset Wildlife Trust)
- Mawley Wood Track (Herefordshire Nature Trust)
- Max Bog (Avon Wildlife Trust)
- Maze Park (Tees Valley Wildlife Trust)
- McAlmont Reserves (Surrey Wildlife Trust)
- Meathop Moss (Cumbria Wildlife Trust)
- Meden Trail (Nottinghamshire Wildlife Trust)
- Meeth Quarry (Devon Wildlife Trust)
- Melincwrt Waterfalls (The Wildlife Trust for South & West Wales)
- Mellis Common (Suffolk Wildlife Trust)
- Melrose Farm Meadows (Worcestershire Wildlife Trust)
- Melverley Meadows (Shropshire Wildlife Trust)
- Mere Sands Wood Local Nature Reserve (The Wildlife Trust for Lancashire, Manchester & north Merseyside)
- Merrivale Wood (Herefordshire Nature Trust)
- Merry's Meadows (Leicestershire & Rutland Wildlife Trust)
- Meshaw Moor (Devon Wildlife Trust)
- Messingham Sand Quarry (Lincolnshire Wildlife Trust)
- Michael's Peace (Dorset Wildlife Trust)
- Mickfield Meadow (Suffolk Wildlife Trust)
- Micklemere (Suffolk Wildlife Trust)
- Middlebriars Wood (Surrey Wildlife Trust)
- Middledown (Mendips) (Somerset Wildlife Trust)
- Middleton Down (Wiltshire Wildlife Trust)
- Midger Wood (Gloucestershire Wildlife Trust)
- Milford Cutting (Ulster Wildlife Trust)
- Milford Green & Coxhill Green (Surrey Wildlife Trust)
- Milkhall Pond (Scottish Wildlife Trust)
- Milkwellburn Wood (Durham Wildlife Trust)
- Mill Bottom (Devon Wildlife Trust)
- Mill Burn (Northumberland Wildlife Trust)
- Mill Crook and Grafton Regis Meadow (The Wildlife Trust for Bedfordshire, Cambridgeshire and Northamptonshire)
- Mill Ham Island (Dorset Wildlife Trust)
- Mill Hill Quarry (Lincolnshire Wildlife Trust)
- Mill Meadow (Worcestershire Wildlife Trust)
- Miller's Dale Quarry (Derbyshire Wildlife Trust)
- Millfield Wood (Berks, Bucks & Oxon Wildlife Trust)
- Milton Heath and The Nower (Surrey Wildlife Trust)
- Milton Locks (Hampshire & IOW Wildlife Trust)
- Miners Rest (Herefordshire Nature Trust)
- Misson Carr (Nottinghamshire Wildlife Trust)
- Mitcheldean Meend Marsh (Gloucestershire Wildlife Trust)
- Monkwood (Worcestershire Wildlife Trust)
- Montrose Basin (Scottish Wildlife Trust)
- Moor Closes (Lincolnshire Wildlife Trust)
- Moor Copse (Berks, Bucks & Oxon Wildlife Trust)
- Moor Farm (Lincolnshire Wildlife Trust)
- Moor Piece Nature Reserve (The Wildlife Trust for Lancashire, Manchester & north Merseyside)
- Moorbridge Pond Nature Reserve (Nottinghamshire Wildlife Trust)
- Moorcroft Wood (The Wildlife Trust for Birmingham and the Black Country)
- Moorlands Nature Reserve (Yorkshire Wildlife Trust)
- Morfa Bychan & Greenacres (North Wales Wildlife Trust)
- Morgan's Hill (Wiltshire Wildlife Trust)
- Morley Brickyards (Derbyshire Wildlife Trust)
- Mortimer Terrace Reserve (London Wildlife Trust)
- Moseley Bog (The Wildlife Trust for Birmingham and the Black Country)
- Moss Valley Woodlands (Sheffield Wildlife Trust)
- Moston Community Nature Reserve (Cheshire Wildlife Trust)
- Moston Fairway (The Wildlife Trust for Lancashire, Manchester & north Merseyside)
- Motlins Hole (Herefordshire Nature Trust)
- Moulton Marsh (Lincolnshire Wildlife Trust)
- Mounsey (Somerset Wildlife Trust)
- Mountsorrel Meadows (Leicestershire & Rutland Wildlife Trust)
- Moyola Waterfoot (Ulster Wildlife Trust)
- Muckton Wood (Lincolnshire Wildlife Trust)
- Mynydd Ffoesidoes (Radnorshire Wildlife Trust)
- Mythe Railway (Gloucestershire Wildlife Trust)

== N ==
- Nansmellyn Marsh (Cornwall Wildlife Trust)
- Nant Melin (The Wildlife Trust for South & West Wales)
- Nantporth (North Wales Wildlife Trust)
- Narborough Bog (Leicestershire & Rutland Wildlife Trust)
- Narborough Railway Line (Norfolk Wildlife Trust)
- Nashenden Down (Kent Wildlife Trust)
- Naunton Court Fields (Worcestershire Wildlife Trust)
- Netcott's Meadow (Avon Wildlife Trust)
- Netherclay Community Woodland (Somerset Wildlife Trust)
- Neu-Lindsey (Gloucestershire Wildlife Trust)
- New Buckenham Common (Norfolk Wildlife Trust)
- New Cross Gate Cutting (London Wildlife Trust)
- New Ferry Butterfly Park (Cheshire Wildlife Trust)
- New Grove Meadows (Gwent Wildlife Trust)
- New Hill & Tannegar (Somerset Wildlife Trust)
- Newbold Quarry (Warwickshire Wildlife Trust)
- Newbourne Springs (Suffolk Wildlife Trust)
- Newbourne Wood (Worcestershire Wildlife Trust)
- Newdigate Brickworks (Surrey Wildlife Trust)
- Newland Grove (Essex Wildlife Trust)
- Newsham Pond (Northumberland Wildlife Trust)
- Newton Reigny (Cumbria Wildlife Trust)
- Next Ness (Cumbria Wildlife Trust)
- Nichols Moss (Cumbria Wildlife Trust)
- Nind (Gloucestershire Wildlife Trust)
- Ningwood Common (Hampshire & IOW Wildlife Trust)
- Nipstone Rock (Shropshire Wildlife Trust)
- Noar Hill (Hampshire & IOW Wildlife Trust)
- Norah Hanbury-Kelk Meadows (Suffolk Wildlife Trust)
- Norbury Park (Surrey Wildlife Trust)
- Nore Hill Chalk Pinnacle (Surrey Wildlife Trust)
- North Cave Wetlands Nature Reserve (Yorkshire Wildlife Trust)
- North Cliffe Wood Nature Reserve (Yorkshire Wildlife Trust)
- North Cove (Suffolk Wildlife Trust)
- North Muskham Lake (Nottinghamshire Wildlife Trust)
- North Newbald Becksies Nature Reserve (Yorkshire Wildlife Trust)
- North Predannack Downs (Cornwall Wildlife Trust)
- North Quarry (Leicestershire & Rutland Wildlife Trust)
- Warnborough Greens (Hampshire & IOW Wildlife Trust)
- North Wingfield (Derbyshire Wildlife Trust)
- Northside Wood (Scottish Wildlife Trust)
- Norwood Road (The Wildlife Trust for Bedfordshire, Cambridgeshire and Northamptonshire)
- Nower Wood (Surrey Wildlife Trust)
- Nunnery Mead (Dorset Wildlife Trust)
- Nupend Wood (Herefordshire Nature Trust)
- Nutfield Marsh (Surrey Wildlife Trust)

== O ==
- Oakerthorpe (Derbyshire Wildlife Trust)
- Oakfield Wood (Essex Wildlife Trust)
- Oakhill Wood (London Wildlife Trust)
- Oakley Hill (Berks, Bucks & Oxon Wildlife Trust)
- Oakwood and Blacklow Spinneys (Warwickshire Wildlife Trust)
- Oare Marshes (Kent Wildlife Trust)
- Oare Meadow (Kent Wildlife Trust)
- Old Burghclere Lime Quarry (Hampshire & IOW Wildlife Trust)
- Old Ford Island (London Wildlife Trust)
- Old Lodge (Sussex Wildlife Trust)
- Old London Road (Gloucestershire Wildlife Trust)
- Old Nun Wood (Warwickshire Wildlife Trust)
- Old Park Hill (Kent Wildlife Trust)
- Old Park Wood (Herts & Middlesex Wildlife Trust)
- Old Sulehay (The Wildlife Trust for Bedfordshire, Cambridgeshire and Northamptonshire)
- Old Warden Tunnel (The Wildlife Trust for Bedfordshire, Cambridgeshire and Northamptonshire)
- Old Warren Hill (The Wildlife Trust for South & West Wales)
- Oldhall Ponds (Scottish Wildlife Trust)
- Orton Moss Nature Reserve (Cumbria Wildlife Trust)
- Osmanthorpe (Nottinghamshire Wildlife Trust)
- Oughtonhead (Herts & Middlesex Wildlife Trust)
- Oulton Marshes (Suffolk Wildlife Trust)
- Ouse Washes (The Wildlife Trust for Bedfordshire, Cambridgeshire and Northamptonshire)
- Over Kellet Pond (The Wildlife Trust for Lancashire, Manchester & north Merseyside)
- Overdale (Derbyshire Wildlife Trust)
- Overhall Grove (The Wildlife Trust for Bedfordshire, Cambridgeshire and Northamptonshire)
- Overton Cliff and Roydon's Corner (The Wildlife Trust for South & West Wales)
- Overton Mere (The Wildlife Trust for South & West Wales)
- Owl Wood and Pit Plantation (Yorkshire Wildlife Trust)
- Owley Wood (Cheshire Wildlife Trust)
- Oxey Mead (Berks, Bucks & Oxon Wildlife Trust)
- Oxley Meadow (Essex Wildlife Trust)
- Oyster's Coppice (Wiltshire Wildlife Trust)

== P ==
- Page's Pasture (Herefordshire Nature Trust)
- Pagham Harbour (Sussex Wildlife Trust)
- Pamber Forest and Upper Inhams Copse (Hampshire & IOW Wildlife Trust)
- Pant Da (The Wildlife Trust for South & West Wales)
- Papercourt Marshes (Surrey Wildlife Trust)
- Papercourt Meadows (Surrey Wildlife Trust)
- Parc Slip (The Wildlife Trust for South & West Wales)
- Parish Field (Herefordshire Nature Trust)
- Park Gate Down - The Hector Wilks Reserve (Kent Wildlife Trust)
- Park Ham & Quarry Hangers (Surrey Wildlife Trust)
- Park Hoskyn (the Hayman Reserve) (Cornwall Wildlife Trust)
- Park Road Ponds (London Wildlife Trust)
- Parkridge Centre, Brueton Park, Solihull (Warwickshire Wildlife Trust)
- Parky Meadow (Herefordshire Nature Trust)
- Parliament Piece (Warwickshire Wildlife Trust)
- Parrot's Drumble (Staffordshire Wildlife Trust)
- Parsonage Moor (Berks, Bucks & Oxon Wildlife Trust)
- Parsonage Wood (Kent Wildlife Trust)
- Pasqueflower (Gloucestershire Wildlife Trust)
- Pasture Wharf (Lincolnshire Wildlife Trust)
- Pasturefields Saltmarsh (Staffordshire Wildlife Trust)
- Patmore Heath (Herts & Middlesex Wildlife Trust)
- Patrick's Wood (Cheshire Wildlife Trust)
- Pavenham Osier Beds (In memory of Horace Church) (The Wildlife Trust for Bedfordshire, Cambridgeshire and Northamptonshire)
- Pawson's Meadow (Lincolnshire Wildlife Trust)
- Payton Marsh (Somerset Wildlife Trust)
- Pearson Park Wildlife Garden (Yorkshire Wildlife Trust)
- Peascombe Reserve (Dorset Wildlife Trust)
- Peascroft Wood (The Wildlife Trust for Birmingham and the Black Country)
- Pease Dean (Scottish Wildlife Trust)
- Peel Wood (The Wildlife Trust for South & West Wales)
- Pegsdon Hills and Hoo Bit (The Wildlife Trust for Bedfordshire, Cambridgeshire and Northamptonshire)
- Pembroke Upper Mill Pond (The Wildlife Trust for South & West Wales)
- Pen Y Waun (Brecknock Wildlife Trust)
- Pendarves Wood (Cornwall Wildlife Trust)
- Penderi Cliffs (The Wildlife Trust for South & West Wales)
- Pengelli Forest (The Wildlife Trust for South & West Wales)
- Penlee Battery (Cornwall Wildlife Trust)
- Pennels Bank Wood (Worcestershire Wildlife Trust)
- Penny Hill Bank (Worcestershire Wildlife Trust)
- Penny Pasture Common (Nottinghamshire Wildlife Trust)
- Penorchard Meadows (Worcestershire Wildlife Trust)
- Pentaloe Glen & Convallaria Area (Herefordshire Nature Trust)
- Pentralltfach (The Wildlife Trust for South & West Wales)
- Pentrosfa Mire (Radnorshire Wildlife Trust)
- Pentwyn Farm SSSI (Gwent Wildlife Trust)
- Pepper Wood (Scottish Wildlife Trust)
- Peppercombe Wood (Wiltshire Wildlife Trust)
- Perceton Wood (Scottish Wildlife Trust)
- Perry Mead (Somerset Wildlife Trust)
- Petershill (Scottish Wildlife Trust)
- Peterstone Wentlooge Marshes SSSI (Gwent Wildlife Trust)
- Pevensey Marshes (Sussex Wildlife Trust)
- Pewit Island (Hampshire & IOW Wildlife Trust)
- Phillips's Point (Cornwall Wildlife Trust)
- Phyllis Currie (Essex Wildlife Trust)
- Pickering's Meadow (Lincolnshire Wildlife Trust)
- Pickering's Scrape (Cheshire Wildlife Trust)
- Piddle Brook Meadows (Worcestershire Wildlife Trust)
- Pilch Field (Berks, Bucks & Oxon Wildlife Trust)
- Pill Paddock (Avon Wildlife Trust)
- Pinchbeck Slipe (Lincolnshire Wildlife Trust)
- Pingle Wood and Cutting (The Wildlife Trust for Bedfordshire, Cambridgeshire and Northamptonshire)
- Piper's Hill & Dodderhill Commons (Worcestershire Wildlife Trust)
- Pirbright Ranges (Surrey Wildlife Trust)
- Pisgah Quarry (North Wales Wildlife Trust)
- Pitsford Reservoir (The Wildlife Trust for Bedfordshire, Cambridgeshire and Northamptonshire)
- Pleasington Old Hall Wood and Wildlife Garden (The Wildlife Trust for Lancashire, Manchester & north Merseyside)
- Ploughman Wood (Nottinghamshire Wildlife Trust)
- Plump Hill Dolomite Quarry (Gloucestershire Wildlife Trust)
- Polhill Bank (Kent Wildlife Trust)
- Pool Ellocks (Herefordshire Nature Trust)
- Poolhay Meadows (Worcestershire Wildlife Trust)
- Poor Mans Wood (The Wildlife Trust for South & West Wales)
- Poors Wood (Cheshire Wildlife Trust)
- Port Eynon Point (The Wildlife Trust for South & West Wales)
- Portbury Wharf (Avon Wildlife Trust)
- Porth Diana (North Wales Wildlife Trust)
- Portrack Marsh (Tees Valley Wildlife Trust)
- Portway Hill (Wildlife Trust for Birmingham and the Black Country)
- Possil Marsh (Scottish Wildlife Trust)
- Potteric Carr Nature Reserve (Yorkshire Wildlife Trust)
- Pound Wood (Essex Wildlife Trust)
- Powerstock Common (Dorset Wildlife Trust)
- Preece's Meadow (Herefordshire Nature Trust)
- Prees Branch Canal (Shropshire Wildlife Trust)
- Prestwick Carr (Northumberland Wildlife Trust)
- Priddacombe Downs (Cornwall Wildlife Trust)
- Prideaux Wood (Cornwall Wildlife Trust)
- Priestcliffe Lees (Derbyshire Wildlife Trust)
- Priestclose Wood (Northumberland Wildlife Trust)
- Priors Coppice (Leicestershire & Rutland Wildlife Trust)
- Prior's Meadow (The Wildlife Trust for South & West Wales)
- Prior's Wood (Avon Wildlife Trust)
- Priory Farm (Avon Wildlife Trust)
- Priory Fields (Warwickshire Wildlife Trust)
- Priory Wood SSSI (Gwent Wildlife Trust)
- Prisk Wood SSSI (Gwent Wildlife Trust)
- Prospect Fields (Somerset Wildlife Trust)
- Pryor's Wood (Herts & Middlesex Wildlife Trust)
- Pulfin Bog Nature Reserve (Yorkshire Wildlife Trust)
- Pumphouse Wood (Cheshire Wildlife Trust)
- Purbeck Marine Wildlife Reserve (Dorset Wildlife Trust)
- Purland Chase (Herefordshire Nature Trust)
- Purn Hill (Avon Wildlife Trust)
- Purwell Ninesprings (Herts & Middlesex Wildlife Trust)
- Puttenham Common (Surrey Wildlife Trust)
- Puxton Moor (Avon Wildlife Trust)
- Pwll Penarth (Montgomeryshire Wildlife Trust)
- Pwll Waun Cynon (The Wildlife Trust for South & West Wales)
- Pwllpatti (Radnorshire Wildlife Trust)
- Pwll-y-Wrach (Brecknock Wildlife Trust)

== Q ==
- Quants (Somerset Wildlife Trust)
- Quarry Banks Nature Reserve (Cumbria Wildlife Trust)
- Quarry Holes Plantation (Nottinghamshire Wildlife Trust)
- Quarry Wood (Kent Wildlife Trust)
- Quarry Wood (Shropshire Wildlife Trust)
- Quebb Corner Meadow (Herefordshire Nature Trust)
- Queendown Warren (Kent Wildlife Trust)
- Quoit Heathland (Cornwall Wildlife Trust)

== R ==
- Rabbitbank Wood (Durham Wildlife Trust)
- Rack Marsh (Berks, Bucks & Oxon Wildlife Trust)
- Rackenford and Knowstone Moors (Devon Wildlife Trust)
- Radford Meadows (Staffordshire Wildlife Trust)
- Radway Meadows (Warwickshire Wildlife Trust)
- Ragpath Heath (Durham Wildlife Trust)
- Rahoy Hills (Scottish Wildlife Trust)
- Rainton Meadows (Durham Wildlife Trust)
- Rainworth Heath (Nottinghamshire Wildlife Trust)
- Raisby Hill Grassland (Durham Wildlife Trust)
- Ramsden Corner (The Wildlife Trust for Bedfordshire, Cambridgeshire and Northamptonshire)
- Ramsey Heights (The Wildlife Trust for Bedfordshire, Cambridgeshire and Northamptonshire)
- Randalls Farm (The Wildlife Trust for Bedfordshire, Cambridgeshire and Northamptonshire)
- Randan Meadows (Worcestershire Wildlife Trust)
- Randan Wood (Worcestershire Wildlife Trust)
- Ranworth Broad (Norfolk Wildlife Trust)
- Rauceby Warren (Lincolnshire Wildlife Trust)
- Raveley Wood (The Wildlife Trust for Bedfordshire, Cambridgeshire and Northamptonshire)
- Ravensroost Wood and Meadow (Wiltshire Wildlife Trust)
- Ray Island and Bonners Saltings (Essex Wildlife Trust)
- Reculver Visitor Centre and Country Park (Kent Wildlife Trust)
- Red Hill (Lincolnshire Wildlife Trust)
- Red House (Montgomeryshire Wildlife Trust)
- Red Jacket Fen (The Wildlife Trust for South & West Wales)
- Red Moss of Balerno (Scottish Wildlife Trust)
- Red Moss of Netherley (Scottish Wildlife Trust)
- Red Rocks Marsh (Cheshire Wildlife Trust)
- Redcar Field (Durham Wildlife Trust)
- Redgrave & Lopham Fen (Suffolk Wildlife Trust)
- Redlake Cottage Meadows (Cornwall Wildlife Trust)
- Redley Cliff (The Wildlife Trust for South & West Wales)
- Reed Pond (Nottinghamshire Wildlife Trust)
- Rewe Mead (Somerset Wildlife Trust)
- Reydon Wood (Suffolk Wildlife Trust)
- Rhayader Tunnel (Radnorshire Wildlife Trust)
- Rhiwledyn (North Wales Wildlife Trust)
- Rhos Cefn Bryn (The Wildlife Trust for South & West Wales)
- Rhos Fiddle (Shropshire Wildlife Trust)
- Rhos Fullbrook (The Wildlife Trust for South & West Wales)
- Rhos Glandenys (The Wildlife Trust for South & West Wales)
- Rhos Glyn-yr-Helyg (The Wildlife Trust for South & West Wales)
- Rhos Pil-Bach & Pennar Fawr (The Wildlife Trust for South & West Wales)
- Rhos-y-Fforest (The Wildlife Trust for South & West Wales)
- Rhydspence Woodland (Herefordshire Nature Trust)
- Richmond Nature Garden (The Wildlife Trust for Birmingham and the Black Country)
- Riddlesdown (London Wildlife Trust)
- Ridley Bottom (Gloucestershire Wildlife Trust)
- Ridlins Mire (Herts & Middlesex Wildlife Trust)
- Rifle Butts Quarry Nature Reserve (Yorkshire Wildlife Trust)
- Rigsby Wood (Lincolnshire Wildlife Trust)
- Ringdown (Somerset Wildlife Trust)
- Ringstead Downs (Norfolk Wildlife Trust)
- Ripon Loop Nature Reserve (Yorkshire Wildlife Trust)
- Risley Glebe (Derbyshire Wildlife Trust)
- River Arrow Nature Reserve (Warwickshire Wildlife Trust)
- Robert's Field (Lincolnshire Wildlife Trust)
- Rocky Plantation (Leicestershire & Rutland Wildlife Trust)
- Rod Wood (Staffordshire Wildlife Trust)
- Rodborough Common (Surrey Wildlife Trust)
- Roding Valley Meadows (Essex Wildlife Trust)
- Rogiet Poorland (Gwent Wildlife Trust)
- Roman River Valley (Essex Wildlife Trust)
- Romers Wood (Herefordshire Nature Trust)
- Romney Marsh Visitor Centre (Kent Wildlife Trust)
- Ron Ward's meadow (Hampshire & IOW Wildlife Trust)
- Ropehaven Cliffs (Cornwall Wildlife Trust)
- Rose End Meadows (Derbyshire Wildlife Trust)
- Rosenannon Downs (Cornwall Wildlife Trust)
- Roslin Glen (Scottish Wildlife Trust)
- Roswell Pits (The Wildlife Trust for Bedfordshire, Cambridgeshire and Northamptonshire)
- Rothwell Country Park (Yorkshire Wildlife Trust)
- Rothwell Gullet (The Wildlife Trust for Bedfordshire, Cambridgeshire and Northamptonshire)
- Rothwell Pastures (Yorkshire Wildlife Trust)
- Rough Hill Wood (Warwickshire Wildlife Trust)
- Roughton Moor Wood (Lincolnshire Wildlife Trust)
- Rowley Green Common (London Wildlife Trust)
- Rowley Hills Nature Reserve (The Wildlife Trust for Birmingham and the Black Country)
- Rowsley Sidings (Derbyshire Wildlife Trust)
- Royate Hill (Avon Wildlife Trust)
- Roydon Common (Norfolk Wildlife Trust)
- Roydon Fen (Suffolk Wildlife Trust)
- Roydon Woods (Hampshire & IOW Wildlife Trust)
- Rudge End Quarry (Herefordshire Nature Trust)
- Rudheath (Cheshire Wildlife Trust)
- Ruewood (Shropshire Wildlife Trust)
- Ruggadon Middlepark (Devon Wildlife Trust)
- Ruggin (Somerset Wildlife Trust)
- Runfold Wood (Surrey Wildlife Trust)
- Rush Furlong (Lincolnshire Wildlife Trust)
- Rushbeds Wood (Berks, Bucks & Oxon Wildlife Trust)
- Rushy Mead (Essex Wildlife Trust)
- Rushy Platt (Wiltshire Wildlife Trust)
- Rutland Water (Leicestershire & Rutland Wildlife Trust)
- Ruxley Gravel Pits (Kent Wildlife Trust)
- Rye Harbour (Sussex Wildlife Trust)
- Rye Meads (Herts & Middlesex Wildlife Trust)
- Ryton Wood (Warwickshire Wildlife Trust)

== S ==
- Sallowsprings (The Wildlife Trust for Bedfordshire, Cambridgeshire and Northamptonshire)
- Salmon Pastures (Sheffield Wildlife Trust)
- Salt Box Hill SSSI (London Wildlife Trust)
- Saltburn Gill (Tees Valley Wildlife Trust)
- Saltersley Moss (Cheshire Wildlife Trust)
- Saltfleetby - Theddlethorpe Dunes (Lincolnshire Wildlife Trust)
- Salthill Quarry Local Nature Reserve (The Wildlife Trust for Lancashire, Manchester & north Merseyside)
- Salthouse Marshes (Norfolk Wildlife Trust)
- Saltmarshe Delph Nature Reserve (Yorkshire Wildlife Trust)
- Sandilands Pit (Lincolnshire Wildlife Trust)
- Sands Meadows (Worcestershire Wildlife Trust)
- Sandwich and Pegwell Bay (Kent Wildlife Trust)
- Sandylay and Moat Woods (Essex Wildlife Trust)
- Sapperton Valley (Gloucestershire Wildlife Trust)
- Sawbridgeworth Marsh (Essex Wildlife Trust)
- Scanniclift Copse (Devon Wildlife Trust)
- Scarlett Visitor Centre and Nature Trail (Manx Wildlife Trust)
- Scarning Fen (Norfolk Wildlife Trust)
- Scotton Common (Lincolnshire Wildlife Trust)
- Seaforth Nature Reserve (The Wildlife Trust for Lancashire, Manchester & north Merseyside)
- Seale Chalk Pit (Surrey Wildlife Trust)
- Sean Hawkins Meadow (Cheshire Wildlife Trust)
- Seaton Cliffs (Scottish Wildlife Trust)
- Seccombe's Wood (Surrey Wildlife Trust)
- Sedge Hole Close (Lincolnshire Wildlife Trust)
- Sedger's Bank (The Wildlife Trust for South & West Wales)
- Sellers Wood (Nottinghamshire Wildlife Trust)
- Selwyns Wood (Sussex Wildlife Trust)
- Semer Water Nature Reserve (Yorkshire Wildlife Trust)
- Sergeants Orchard (Essex Wildlife Trust)
- Seven Barrows (Berks, Bucks & Oxon Wildlife Trust)
- Sevenoaks Wildlife Reserve and Jeffery Harrison Visitor Centre (Kent Wildlife Trust)
- Severn Farm Pond (Montgomeryshire Wildlife Trust)
- Sewell Cutting (The Wildlife Trust for Bedfordshire, Cambridgeshire and Northamptonshire)
- Shabden Park (Surrey Wildlife Trust)
- Shadowbrook Meadows (Warwickshire Wildlife Trust)
- Shadwell Wood (Essex Wildlife Trust)
- Sharnbrook Summit and Wymington Meadow (The Wildlife Trust for Bedfordshire, Cambridgeshire and Northamptonshire)
- Sharpham Moor (Somerset Wildlife Trust)
- Shepherd's Close (The Wildlife Trust for Bedfordshire, Cambridgeshire and Northamptonshire)
- Shepperlands Farm (Berks, Bucks & Oxon Wildlife Trust)
- Shepreth L Moor (The Wildlife Trust for Bedfordshire, Cambridgeshire and Northamptonshire)
- Sherburn Willows Nature Reserve (Yorkshire Wildlife Trust)
- Shewalton Sandpits (Scottish Wildlife Trust)
- Shewalton Wood (Scottish Wildlife Trust)
- Shian Wood (Scottish Wildlife Trust)
- Shibdon Pond (Durham Wildlife Trust)
- Short Wood and Southwick Wood (The Wildlife Trust for Bedfordshire, Cambridgeshire and Northamptonshire)
- Shotgate Thickets (Essex Wildlife Trust)
- Shut Heath Wood (Essex Wildlife Trust)
- Shutts Copse (Hampshire & IOW Wildlife Trust)
- Siccaridge Wood (Gloucestershire Wildlife Trust)
- Side Farm Meadows (Staffordshire Wildlife Trust)
- Sideland (Radnorshire Wildlife Trust)
- Silent Valley Local Nature Reserve SSSI (Gwent Wildlife Trust)
- Silverines Meadows (Lincolnshire Wildlife Trust)
- Simpson Salting's (Suffolk Wildlife Trust)
- Sinderland Green Woods (Cheshire Wildlife Trust)
- Sizewell Belts (Suffolk Wildlife Trust)
- Skaters' Meadow (The Wildlife Trust for Bedfordshire, Cambridgeshire and Northamptonshire)
- Skipper's Island (Essex Wildlife Trust)
- Skokholm Island (The Wildlife Trust for South & West Wales)
- Skomer Island (The Wildlife Trust for South & West Wales)
- Skylarks (Nottinghamshire Wildlife Trust)
- Sladden Wood (Kent Wildlife Trust)
- Slievenacloy (Ulster Wildlife Trust)
- Smallbrook Meadows (Wiltshire Wildlife Trust)
- Smardale Gill Nature Reserve (Cumbria Wildlife Trust)
- Snakeholm Pastures (Yorkshire Wildlife Trust)
- Snape Marshes (Suffolk Wildlife Trust)
- Snipe Dales (Lincolnshire Wildlife Trust)
- Snitterfield Bushes (Warwickshire Wildlife Trust)
- Snows Farm (Gloucestershire Wildlife Trust)
- Soham Meadow (The Wildlife Trust for Bedfordshire, Cambridgeshire and Northamptonshire)
- Sole Common Pond (Berks, Bucks & Oxon Wildlife Trust)
- Solutia Meadows SSSI (Gwent Wildlife Trust)
- Sopley Common (Dorset Wildlife Trust)
- Sotby Meadows (Lincolnshire Wildlife Trust)
- Sourlie Wood (Scottish Wildlife Trust)
- Sourton Quarry (Devon Wildlife Trust)
- South Blean (Kent Wildlife Trust)
- South Close Field (Northumberland Wildlife Trust)
- South Hill (Somerset Wildlife Trust)
- South House Pavement Nature Reserve (Yorkshire Wildlife Trust)
- South Efford Marsh (Devon Wildlife Trust)
- South Poorton (Dorset Wildlife Trust)
- South Swale (Kent Wildlife Trust)
- South Walney Nature Reserve (Cumbria Wildlife Trust)
- South Witham Verges (Lincolnshire Wildlife Trust)
- Southerham (Sussex Wildlife Trust)
- Southerscales Nature Reserve (Yorkshire Wildlife Trust)
- Southfield Farm Marsh (The Wildlife Trust for Bedfordshire, Cambridgeshire and Northamptonshire)
- Southmoor (Hampshire & IOW Wildlife Trust)
- Southorpe Meadow and Paddock (The Wildlife Trust for Bedfordshire, Cambridgeshire and Northamptonshire)
- Southwick Coast (Scottish Wildlife Trust)
- Sovell Down (Dorset Wildlife Trust)
- Sow Dale (Lincolnshire Wildlife Trust)
- Spa Ponds (Nottinghamshire Wildlife Trust)
- Spalford Warren (Nottinghamshire Wildlife Trust)
- Spencer Road Wetlands (London Wildlife Trust)
- Spey Bay (Scottish Wildlife Trust)
- Spinneyfields (Worcestershire Wildlife Trust)
- Spinnies, Aberogwen (North Wales Wildlife Trust)
- Spion Kop Quarry (Gloucestershire Wildlife Trust)
- Spong Wood (Kent Wildlife Trust)
- Spring Wood (Derbyshire Wildlife Trust)
- Springdale Farm (Gwent Wildlife Trust)
- Sprotbrough Flash Nature Reserve (Yorkshire Wildlife Trust)
- Spuckles & Kennelling Woods (Wilderness Down) (Kent Wildlife Trust)
- Spurn National Nature Reserve (Yorkshire Wildlife Trust)
- Spynes Mere (Surrey Wildlife Trust)
- St Catherine's Hill (Hampshire & IOW Wildlife Trust)
- St Erth Pits (Cornwall Wildlife Trust)
- St George's Island (Cornwall Wildlife Trust)
- St Lawrence Bank (Hampshire & IOW Wildlife Trust)
- St Lawrence Undercliff (Hampshire & IOW Wildlife Trust)
- St Nicholas Park (Northumberland Wildlife Trust)
- Stanborough Reedmarsh (Herts & Middlesex Wildlife Trust)
- Stanford Reservoir (The Wildlife Trust for Bedfordshire, Cambridgeshire and Northamptonshire)
- Stanford Warren (Essex Wildlife Trust)
- Stanground Newt Ponds (The Wildlife Trust for Bedfordshire, Cambridgeshire and Northamptonshire)
- Stanground Wash (The Wildlife Trust for Bedfordshire, Cambridgeshire and Northamptonshire)
- Stanley Moss (Durham Wildlife Trust)
- Stanton's Pit (Lincolnshire Wildlife Trust)
- Stapleton Mire (Devon Wildlife Trust)
- Staveley Nature Reserve (Yorkshire Wildlife Trust)
- Stenders Quarry (Gloucestershire Wildlife Trust)
- Stenhouse Wood (Scottish Wildlife Trust)
- Stephen's Vale (Avon Wildlife Trust)
- Stockbury Hill Wood (Kent Wildlife Trust)
- Stocker's Lake (Herts & Middlesex Wildlife Trust)
- Stocking Springs Wood (Herts & Middlesex Wildlife Trust)
- Stockings Meadow (Herefordshire Nature Trust)
- Stocksmoor Common Nature Reserve (Yorkshire Wildlife Trust)
- Stockton Cutting (Warwickshire Wildlife Trust)
- Stockwood Meadows (Worcestershire Wildlife Trust)
- Stockwood Open Space (Avon Wildlife Trust)
- Stoke Bruerne Brick Pits (The Wildlife Trust for Bedfordshire, Cambridgeshire and Northamptonshire)
- Stoke Common Meadows (Wiltshire Wildlife Trust)
- Stoke Floods (Warwickshire Wildlife Trust)
- Stoke Wood End Quarter (The Wildlife Trust for Bedfordshire, Cambridgeshire and Northamptonshire)
- Stone Wood (Kent Wildlife Trust)
- Stonebridge Meadows (Warwickshire Wildlife Trust)
- Stonehill Down (Dorset Wildlife Trust)
- Stonesby Quarry (Leicestershire & Rutland Wildlife Trust)
- Stoneycliffe Wood Nature Reserve (Yorkshire Wildlife Trust)
- Storton's Pits and Duston Mill Meadow (The Wildlife Trust for Bedfordshire, Cambridgeshire and Northamptonshire)
- Stow Maries Halt (Essex Wildlife Trust)
- Stowford Moor (Devon Wildlife Trust)
- Straidkilly (Ulster Wildlife Trust)
- Strawberry Banks (Gloucestershire Wildlife Trust)
- Strawberry Cottage Wood SSSI (Gwent Wildlife Trust)
- Strawberry Hills Heath (Nottinghamshire Wildlife Trust)
- Strensall Common Nature Reserve (Yorkshire Wildlife Trust)
- Stringer's Common (Surrey Wildlife Trust)
- Stuart Fawkes (Gloucestershire Wildlife Trust)
- Summer Leys (The Wildlife Trust for Bedfordshire, Cambridgeshire and Northamptonshire)
- Summerseat Nature Reserve (The Wildlife Trust for Lancashire, Manchester & north Merseyside)
- Sunnybank (Sheffield Wildlife Trust)
- Surfleet Lows (Lincolnshire Wildlife Trust)
- Sutton & Hollesley Commons (Suffolk Wildlife Trust)
- Sutton Holms (Dorset Wildlife Trust)
- Sutton's Pond (Somerset Wildlife Trust)
- Swanpond Copse (Hampshire & IOW Wildlife Trust)
- Swanpool Marsh (Devon Wildlife Trust)
- Swanvale (Cornwall Wildlife Trust)
- Swanwick Lakes (Hampshire & IOW Wildlife Trust)
- Sweeney Fen (Shropshire Wildlife Trust)
- Swettenham Meadows (Cheshire Wildlife Trust)
- Swift Valley Nature Reserve (Warwickshire Wildlife Trust)
- Swilley Swathes (Herefordshire Nature Trust)
- SWT Visitor Centre (Shropshire Wildlife Trust)
- Sydenham Hill Wood and Cox's Walk (London Wildlife Trust)
- Syderstone Common (Norfolk Wildlife Trust)
- Sydlings Copse (Berks, Bucks & Oxon Wildlife Trust)
- Sylvia's Meadow (Cornwall Wildlife Trust)

== T ==
- Tadnoll and Winfrith Heath (Dorset Wildlife Trust)
- Taf Fechan (The Wildlife Trust for South & West Wales)
- Tailby Meadow (The Wildlife Trust for Bedfordshire, Cambridgeshire and Northamptonshire)
- Tailend Moss (Scottish Wildlife Trust)
- Talich (Scottish Wildlife Trust)
- Talley Lakes (The Wildlife Trust for South & West Wales)
- Tamar Estuary (Cornwall Wildlife Trust)
- Tarn Sike Nature Reserve (Cumbria Wildlife Trust)
- Tealham and Tadham Moor (Somerset Wildlife Trust)
- Teifi Marshes (The Wildlife Trust for South & West Wales)
- Temple Balsall (Warwickshire Wildlife Trust)
- Temple Carr Barr (The Wildlife Trust for South & West Wales)
- Ten Acre Wood and Meadows (London Wildlife Trust)
- Testwood Lakes (Hampshire & IOW Wildlife Trust)
- Tetney Blow Wells (Lincolnshire Wildlife Trust)
- Teversal Pasture (Nottinghamshire Wildlife Trust)
- Tewin Orchard and Hopkyns Wood (Herts & Middlesex Wildlife Trust)
- Tewinbury (Herts & Middlesex Wildlife Trust)
- Thacka Beck (Cumbria Wildlife Trust)
- The Avenue Washlands (Derbyshire Wildlife Trust)
- The Betts Reserve (Worcestershire Wildlife Trust)
- The Border Mires (Northumberland Wildlife Trust)
- The Byddwn (Brecknock Wildlife Trust)
- The Christopher Cadbury Wetland Reserve at Upton Warren (Worcestershire Wildlife Trust)
- The Deneway (Sussex Wildlife Trust)
- The Devenish Reserve (Wiltshire Wildlife Trust)
- The Devil's Spittleful & Rifle Range and Blackstone Farm Fields (Worcestershire Wildlife Trust)
- The Ercall (Shropshire Wildlife Trust)
- The Firs (Wiltshire Wildlife Trust)
- The Forest (Surrey Wildlife Trust)
- The Gill (Kent Wildlife Trust)
- The Greenway (London Wildlife Trust)
- The Gwen Finch Wetland Reserve (Worcestershire Wildlife Trust)
- The Hollies (Shropshire Wildlife Trust)
- The Howls (Tees Valley Wildlife Trust)
- The Knapp and Papermill Nature Reserve (Worcestershire Wildlife Trust)
- The Larches (Kent Wildlife Trust)
- The Lines Way (Yorkshire Wildlife Trust)
- The Lucas Reserve (The Wildlife Trust for South & West Wales)
- The Mens (Sussex Wildlife Trust)
- The Mere, Framlingham (Suffolk Wildlife Trust)
- The Michael Harper Reserves (Queens Wood) (Herefordshire Nature Trust)
- The Miley (Scottish Wildlife Trust)
- The Moors (Surrey Wildlife Trust)
- The Mount Wood (Herefordshire Nature Trust)
- Hoe Road Meadow (Hampshire & IOW Wildlife Trust)
- The Old Sludge Beds (Devon Wildlife Trust)
- The Park Campus, University of Gloucestershire (Gloucestershire Wildlife Trust)
- The Parks (Herefordshire Nature Trust)
- The Plantation (Shropshire Wildlife Trust)
- The Plens (The Wildlife Trust for Bedfordshire, Cambridgeshire and Northamptonshire)
- The Quinta (Cheshire Wildlife Trust)
- The Riddy (The Wildlife Trust for Bedfordshire, Cambridgeshire and Northamptonshire)
- The Rough (Devon Wildlife Trust)
- The Sheepleas (Surrey Wildlife Trust)
- The Shere Woodlands (Surrey Wildlife Trust)
- The Shrubberies (Lincolnshire Wildlife Trust)
- The Sturts North (Herefordshire Nature Trust)
- The Sturts South (Herefordshire Nature Trust)
- The Warren (London Wildlife Trust)
- The Wern (Gwent Wildlife Trust)
- Thelnetham Fen (Suffolk Wildlife Trust)
- Thompson Common (Norfolk Wildlife Trust)
- Thorley Wash (Herts and Middlesex Wildlife Trust)
- Thorndon Countryside Centre (Essex Wildlife Trust)
- Thornton Glen (Scottish Wildlife Trust)
- Thornton Wood (Cheshire Wildlife Trust)
- Thorpe Hay Meadow (Surrey Wildlife Trust)
- Thorpe Marsh Nature Reserve (Yorkshire Wildlife Trust)
- Thorpe Marshes Nature Reserve (Norfolk Wildlife Trust)
- Thorpe Wood (The Wildlife Trust for Bedfordshire, Cambridgeshire and Northamptonshire)
- Thorswood (Staffordshire Wildlife Trust)
- Three Corner Grove (London Wildlife Trust)
- Three Cornered Meadow (North Wales Wildlife Trust)
- Three Groves Wood (Gloucestershire Wildlife Trust)
- Thrift Wood (Essex Wildlife Trust)
- Thundry Meadows (Surrey Wildlife Trust)
- Thurlbear Wood (Somerset Wildlife Trust)
- Thurlby Fen Slipe (Lincolnshire Wildlife Trust)
- Thursford Wood (Norfolk Wildlife Trust)
- Tickenham Hill (Avon Wildlife Trust)
- Tiddesley Wood – the Harry Green Reserve (Worcestershire Wildlife Trust)
- Tilburstow Hill (Surrey Wildlife Trust)
- Tile Wood (Essex Wildlife Trust)
- Tilton Railway Cutting (Leicestershire & Rutland Wildlife Trust)
- Tincombe (Cornwall Wildlife Trust)
- Tiptree Heath (Essex Wildlife Trust)
- Titchmarsh (The Wildlife Trust for Bedfordshire, Cambridgeshire and Northamptonshire)
- Titley Pool (Herefordshire Nature Trust)
- Toby's Hill (Lincolnshire Wildlife Trust)
- Tocil Wood Nature Reserve (Warwickshire Wildlife Trust)
- Toft Tunnel (Lincolnshire Wildlife Trust)
- Tollesbury Wick (Essex Wildlife Trust)
- Tony's Patch (Northumberland Wildlife Trust)
- Tor Hole Fields (Somerset Wildlife Trust)
- Tortoiseshell Wood and Meadows (Lincolnshire Wildlife Trust)
- Totteridge Fields (London Wildlife Trust)
- Totternhoe (The Wildlife Trust for Bedfordshire, Cambridgeshire and Northamptonshire)
- Town Kelloe Bank (Durham Wildlife Trust)
- Townclose Hills (Yorkshire Wildlife Trust)
- Townsend (Dorset Wildlife Trust)
- Traeth Glaslyn (North Wales Wildlife Trust)
- Trebarwith (Cornwall Wildlife Trust)
- Trench Wood Nature Reserve (Worcestershire Wildlife Trust)
- Trentabank Reservoir (Cheshire Wildlife Trust)
- Tresayes (Cornwall Wildlife Trust)
- Treswell Wood Nature Reserve (Nottinghamshire Wildlife Trust)
- Trewalkin Meadow (Brecknock Wildlife Trust)
- Trimdon Grange Quarry (Durham Wildlife Trust)
- Trimley Marshes (Suffolk Wildlife Trust)
- Tring Reservoirs (Herts & Middlesex Wildlife Trust)
- Troublefield (Dorset Wildlife Trust)
- Tuckmill Meadow (Berks, Bucks & Oxon Wildlife Trust)
- Tudhoe Mill Wood (Durham Wildlife Trust)
- Tummel Shingle Islands (Scottish Wildlife Trust)
- Tunman Wood (Lincolnshire Wildlife Trust)
- Tunnel Hill Meadow (Worcestershire Wildlife Trust)
- Turners Field (Kent Wildlife Trust)
- Twentywellsick Wood Nature Reserve (Yorkshire Wildlife Trust)
- Two Tree Island (Essex Wildlife Trust)
- Twywell Hills and Dales (The Wildlife Trust for Bedfordshire, Cambridgeshire and Northamptonshire)
- Ty Brith (Montgomeryshire Wildlife Trust)
- Ty Newydd Gardens (The Wildlife Trust for South & West Wales)
- Tyland Barn (Kent Wildlife Trust)
- Tylcau Hill (Radnorshire Wildlife Trust)
- Tysoe Island (Warwickshire Wildlife Trust)
- Tywardreath Marsh (Cornwall Wildlife Trust)

== U ==
- Ubley Warren (Somerset Wildlife Trust)
- Ufton Fields (Warwickshire Wildlife Trust)
- Ulverscroft (Leicestershire & Rutland Wildlife Trust)
- Umbra (Ulster Wildlife Trust)
- Underdown (Surrey Wildlife Trust)
- Uppacott Wood (Devon Wildlife Trust)
- Upper Coldwell Reservoir (The Wildlife Trust for Lancashire, Manchester & north Merseyside)
- Upper Dunsforth Carr Nature Reserve (Yorkshire Wildlife Trust)
- Upper Inhams Copse (Hampshire & IOW Wildlife Trust)
- Upper Nethan Gorge (Scottish Wildlife Trust)
- Upper Park Wood Nature Reserve (Yorkshire Wildlife Trust)
- Upper Ray Meadows (Berks, Bucks & Oxon Wildlife Trust)
- Upper Swingley Wood (Herefordshire Nature Trust)
- Upper Welson Marsh (Herefordshire Nature Trust)
- Upton Broad and Marshes (Norfolk Wildlife Trust)
- Upton Heath (Dorset Wildlife Trust)
- Upton Meadow (Cornwall Wildlife Trust)
- Upton Towans (Cornwall Wildlife Trust)
- Upwood Meadows (The Wildlife Trust for Bedfordshire, Cambridgeshire and Northamptonshire)
- Uxbridge Alderglade (Herts & Middlesex Wildlife Trust)
- Uxbridge College Pond (London Wildlife Trust)
- Uxbridge Moor (London Wildlife Trust)

== V ==
- Val du Saou (Alderney Wildlife Trust)
- Vann Lake (Surrey Wildlife Trust)
- Vealand Farm (Devon Wildlife Trust)
- Veilstone Moor (Devon Wildlife Trust)
- Vell Mill Daffodil Meadow (Gloucestershire Wildlife Trust)
- Venn Ottery (Devon Wildlife Trust)
- Ventongimps Moor (Cornwall Wildlife Trust)
- Vicarage Meadows (Brecknock Wildlife Trust)
- Vincent's Wood (Wiltshire Wildlife Trust)
- Volehouse Moor (Devon Wildlife Trust)

== W ==
- Waitby Greenriggs Nature Reserve (Cumbria Wildlife Trust)
- Walborough (Avon Wildlife Trust)
- Walkeringham Nature Reserve (Nottinghamshire Wildlife Trust)
- Wallacebank Wood (Scottish Wildlife Trust)
- Wallis Wood (Surrey Wildlife Trust)
- Waltham Brooks (Sussex Wildlife Trust)
- Walton Common (Avon Wildlife Trust)
- Wangford Warren (Suffolk Wildlife Trust)
- Wanlip Meadows (Leicestershire & Rutland Wildlife Trust)
- Wansford Pasture & Standen's Pasture (The Wildlife Trust for Bedfordshire, Cambridgeshire and Northamptonshire)
- Wappenbury Wood (Warwickshire Wildlife Trust)
- Warburg Nature Reserve (Berks, Bucks & Oxon Wildlife Trust)
- Warburton's Wood (Cheshire Wildlife Trust)
- Waresley & Gransden Woods (The Wildlife Trust for Bedfordshire, Cambridgeshire and Northamptonshire)
- Warleigh Point (Devon Wildlife Trust)
- Warley Place (Essex Wildlife Trust)
- Warren Bank (Berks, Bucks & Oxon Wildlife Trust)
- Warton Crag (The Wildlife Trust for Lancashire, Manchester & north Merseyside)
- Water Haigh Woodland Park (Yorkshire Wildlife Trust)
- Waterford Heath (Herts & Middlesex Wildlife Trust)
- Waterloo (Herefordshire Nature Trust)
- Watford Lodge (Derbyshire Wildlife Trust)
- Wattle Wood (Kent Wildlife Trust)
- Watts Bank (Berks, Bucks & Oxon Wildlife Trust)
- Watts Wood (Lincolnshire Wildlife Trust)
- Wayland Wood (Norfolk Wildlife Trust)
- Weag's Barn (Staffordshire Wildlife Trust)
- Weavers Down Bog (Hampshire & IOW Wildlife Trust)
- Weeleyhall Wood (Essex Wildlife Trust)
- Weeting Heath National Nature Reserve (Norfolk Wildlife Trust)
- Weetslade Country Park (Northumberland Wildlife Trust)
- Welches Meadow (Warwickshire Wildlife Trust)
- Welcombe Hills (Warwickshire Wildlife Trust)
- Wellington Castle Fields (Somerset Wildlife Trust)
- Wells Farm (Berks, Bucks & Oxon Wildlife Trust)
- Welton-le-Wold (Lincolnshire Wildlife Trust)
- Welwick Saltmarsh Nature Reserve (Yorkshire Wildlife Trust)
- Wem Moss (Shropshire Wildlife Trust)
- Wembury Marine Centre (Devon Wildlife Trust)
- Wentworth (Surrey Wildlife Trust)
- Wern Plemys (Brecknock Wildlife Trust)
- Wern Wood (Herefordshire Nature Trust)
- Werndryd (Radnorshire Wildlife Trust)
- Wessington Wood & Pasture (Herefordshire Nature Trust)
- West Bexington (Dorset Wildlife Trust)
- West Blean and Thornden Woods (Kent Wildlife Trust)
- West Burton Meadow (Nottinghamshire Wildlife Trust)
- West Coker Fen (Somerset Wildlife Trust)
- West Dean Woods (Sussex Wildlife Trust)
- West Fleetham (Northumberland Wildlife Trust)
- West Humble Bat Reserve (Surrey Wildlife Trust)
- West Kent Golf Course (London Wildlife Trust)
- West Quarry Braes (Scottish Wildlife Trust)
- West Williamston (The Wildlife Trust for South & West Wales)
- West Wood (Essex Wildlife Trust)
- Westfield Pill (The Wildlife Trust for South & West Wales)
- Westfield Wood (Kent Wildlife Trust)
- Westhay Heath (Somerset Wildlife Trust)
- Westhay Moor NNR (Somerset Wildlife Trust)
- Westhouse Wood (Essex Wildlife Trust)
- Weston Big Wood (Avon Wildlife Trust)
- Weston Moor (Avon Wildlife Trust)
- Weston Turville Reservoir (Berks, Bucks & Oxon Wildlife Trust)
- Westwell Gorse (Berks, Bucks & Oxon Wildlife Trust)
- Wetley Moor Common (Staffordshire Wildlife Trust)
- Wharram Quarry Nature Reserve (Yorkshire Wildlife Trust)
- Wheldrake Ings Nature Reserve (Yorkshire Wildlife Trust)
- Whelford Pools (Gloucestershire Wildlife Trust)
- Whippets Cant (Surrey Wildlife Trust)
- Whisby Nature Park (Lincolnshire Wildlife Trust)
- Whitacre Heath SSSI (Warwickshire Wildlife Trust)
- Whitbarrow - Howe Ridding Wood (Cumbria Wildlife Trust)
- Whitbarrow-Hervey Memorial Reserve (Cumbria Wildlife Trust)
- Whitbourne Glebe (Herefordshire Nature Trust)
- Whitcliffe Common (Shropshire Wildlife Trust)
- White Downs (Surrey Wildlife Trust)
- White Rocks (Herefordshire Nature Trust)
- Whitecross Green Wood (Berks, Bucks & Oxon Wildlife Trust)
- Whitefield (Somerset Wildlife Trust)
- Whitehouse Meadow (Hampshire & IOW Wildlife Trust)
- Whitelee Moor (Northumberland Wildlife Trust)
- Whitlaw Wood (Scottish Wildlife Trust)
- Whitmoor & Rickford Common (Surrey Wildlife Trust)
- Whitnash Brook (Warwickshire Wildlife Trust)
- Whittle Dene (Northumberland Wildlife Trust)
- Wicksteed Park (The Wildlife Trust for Bedfordshire, Cambridgeshire and Northamptonshire)
- Wigan Flashes Local Nature Reserve (The Wildlife Trust for Lancashire, Manchester & north Merseyside)
- Wigpool (Gloucestershire Wildlife Trust)
- Wilden Marsh (Worcestershire Wildlife Trust)
- Wilderness Island (London Wildlife Trust)
- Wildmoor Heath (Berks, Bucks & Oxon Wildlife Trust)
- Wilford Claypit (Nottinghamshire Wildlife Trust)
- Williamston (Northumberland Wildlife Trust)
- Willington Gravel Pits (Derbyshire Wildlife Trust)
- Willoughby Branch Line (Lincolnshire Wildlife Trust)
- Willoughby Meadow (Lincolnshire Wildlife Trust)
- Willow Farm Wood Nature Reserve (The Wildlife Trust for Lancashire, Manchester & north Merseyside)
- Willow Garth Nature Reserve (Yorkshire Wildlife Trust)
- Willow Tree Fen (Lincolnshire Wildlife Trust)
- Willowmead (Herts & Middlesex Wildlife Trust)
- Willsbridge Valley (Avon Wildlife Trust)
- Wilson's Pits (The Wildlife Trust for Bedfordshire, Cambridgeshire and Northamptonshire)
- Wilwell Farm Cutting Nature Reserve (Nottinghamshire Wildlife Trust)
- Wimberry Quarries (Gloucestershire Wildlife Trust)
- Windmill Farm (Cornwall Wildlife Trust)
- Windmill Hill (Worcestershire Wildlife Trust)
- Windmill Spinney (Warwickshire Wildlife Trust)
- Wingmoor Farm Meadow (Gloucestershire Wildlife Trust)
- Winks Meadow (Suffolk Wildlife Trust)
- Winnall Moors (Hampshire & IOW Wildlife Trust)
- Wisley & Ockham Commons (Surrey Wildlife Trust)
- Wistow Wood (The Wildlife Trust for Bedfordshire, Cambridgeshire and Northamptonshire)
- Withdean Woods (Sussex Wildlife Trust)
- Withial Combe (Somerset Wildlife Trust)
- Withybeds (Radnorshire Wildlife Trust)
- Wolborough Fen (Devon Wildlife Trust)
- Wolla Bank Pit (Lincolnshire Wildlife Trust)
- Wolla Bank Reedbed (Lincolnshire Wildlife Trust)
- Wolseley Centre (Staffordshire Wildlife Trust)
- Wood Lane (Shropshire Wildlife Trust)
- Woodah Farm (Devon Wildlife Trust)
- Woodford Halse (The Wildlife Trust for Bedfordshire, Cambridgeshire and Northamptonshire)
- Woodhall Dean (Scottish Wildlife Trust)
- Woodham Fen (Essex Wildlife Trust)
- Woodhouse Washlands Nature Reserve (Wildlife Trust for Sheffield and Rotherham)
- Woods Mill (Sussex Wildlife Trust)
- Woodside (Derbyshire Wildlife Trust)
- Woodside (Herefordshire Nature Trust)
- Woodsides Meadow (Berks, Bucks & Oxon Wildlife Trust)
- Woodston Ponds (The Wildlife Trust for Bedfordshire, Cambridgeshire and Northamptonshire)
- Woodthorpe Meadow (Nottinghamshire Wildlife Trust)
- Woodwalton Marsh (The Wildlife Trust for Bedfordshire, Cambridgeshire and Northamptonshire)
- Woorgreens (Gloucestershire Wildlife Trust)
- Wortham Ling (Suffolk Wildlife Trust)
- Wotton, Abinger & Broadmoor Commons (Surrey Wildlife Trust)
- Wrabness Nature Reserve (Essex Wildlife Trust)
- Wreay Woods Nature Reserve (Cumbria Wildlife Trust)
- Wyeswood Common (Gwent Wildlife Trust)
- Wyevale Wood (Herefordshire Nature Trust)
- Wyken Slough (Warwickshire Wildlife Trust)
- Wymeswold Meadows (Leicestershire & Rutland Wildlife Trust)
- Wyming Brook (Sheffield Wildlife Trust)
- Wymondham Rough (Leicestershire & Rutland Wildlife Trust)
- Wyver Lane (Derbyshire Wildlife Trust)

== Y ==
- Y Ddol Uchaf (North Wales Wildlife Trust)
- Y Graig (North Wales Wildlife Trust)
- Y Gweira (The Wildlife Trust for South & West Wales)
- Yarley Fields (Somerset Wildlife Trust)
- Yarty Moor (Somerset Wildlife Trust)
- Yarwell Dingle and Pond (The Wildlife Trust for Bedfordshire, Cambridgeshire and Northamptonshire)
- Yeading Brook Meadows (London Wildlife Trust)
- Yellands Meadow Nature Reserve (Yorkshire Wildlife Trust)
- Yetholm Loch (Scottish Wildlife Trust)
- Yockletts Bank (Kent Wildlife Trust)
