= Byfield Pool =

Nature reserve in Northamptonshire, England

Coordinates: 52.17°N 1.269°W

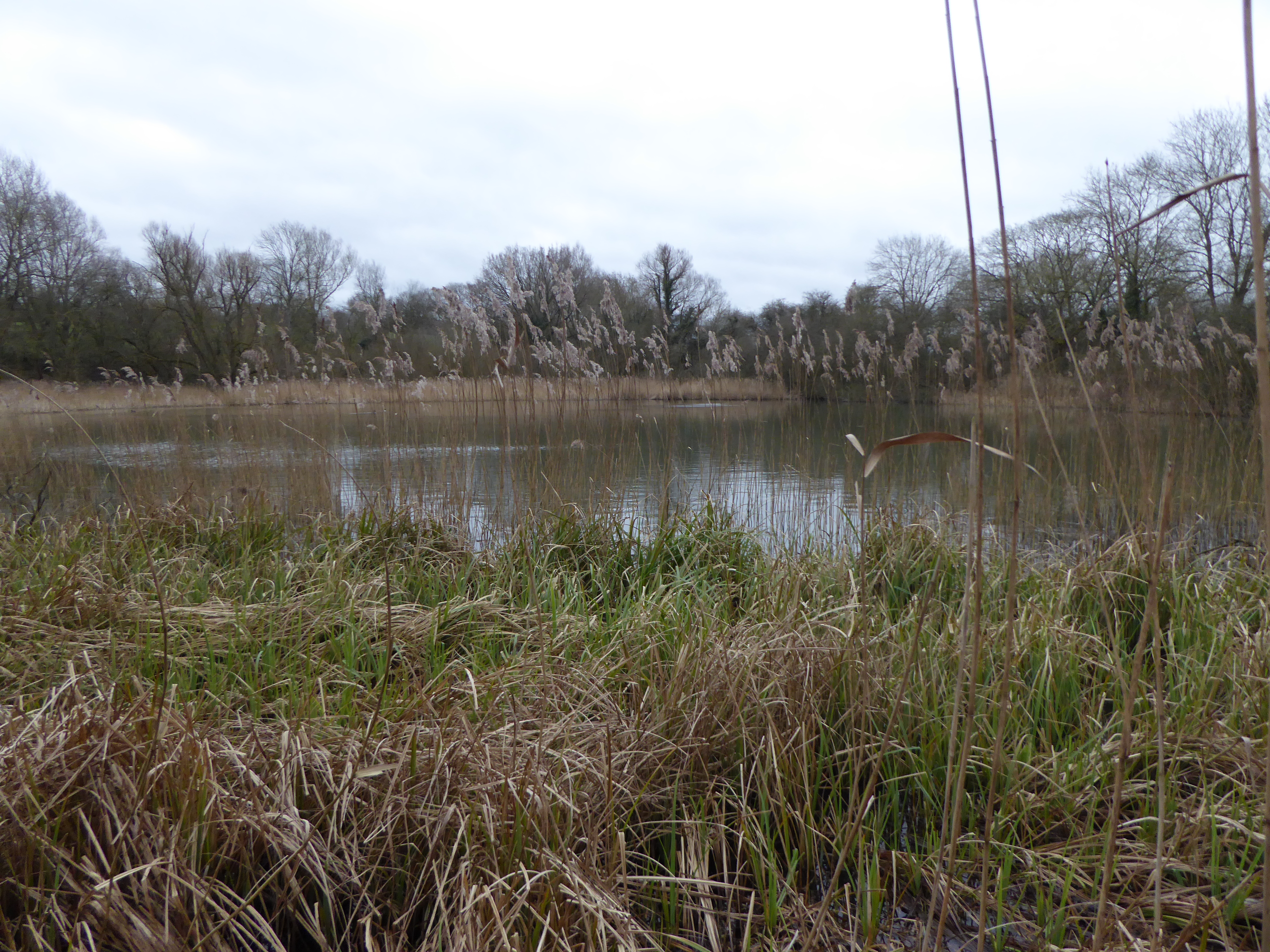
- Interactive map of Byfield Pool
- Type: Nature reserve
- Location: Byfield, Northamptonshire
- OS grid: SP 501 527
- Area: 4 hectares (9.9 acres)
- Manager: Wildlife Trust for Bedfordshire, Cambridgeshire and Northamptonshire

Byfield Pool is a 4 hectare nature reserve west of Byfield in Northamptonshire. It was managed by the Wildlife Trust for Bedfordshire, Cambridgeshire and Northamptonshire until 2020, when management was handed back to the Canal & River Trust, who own the site.

This secluded pool, which is adjacent to the Boddington Reservoir, was constructed in the 1790s to supply water to the Oxford Canal. Water rails and tufted ducks breed on the pond, and there are many frogs and other amphibians. A wide range of other birds nest in the adjacent scrub and woods. Mammals include rabbits and red foxes.

There is access by a footpath from Boddington Road east of Boddington Reservoir, and by a footpath from Byfield.
