= Underdown =

Underdown is a surname. Notable people with the surname include:

- Charles Edward Underdown (Edward Underdown) (1908–1989), English actor
- David Underdown (1925–2009), English historian
- Emanuel Maguire Underdown (1831–1913), English barrister, author and industrialist
- Emily Underdown (1863–1947), English author
- George Underdown (1859–1895), English cricketer
- Harry Charles Bailee Underdown (1877–1963), English barrister and industrialist
- James Underdown (born 1960), executive director of The Center for Inquiry (CFI) West in Los Angeles
- Thomas Underdown (16th century), English poet and translator
