= Milton Heath and The Nower =

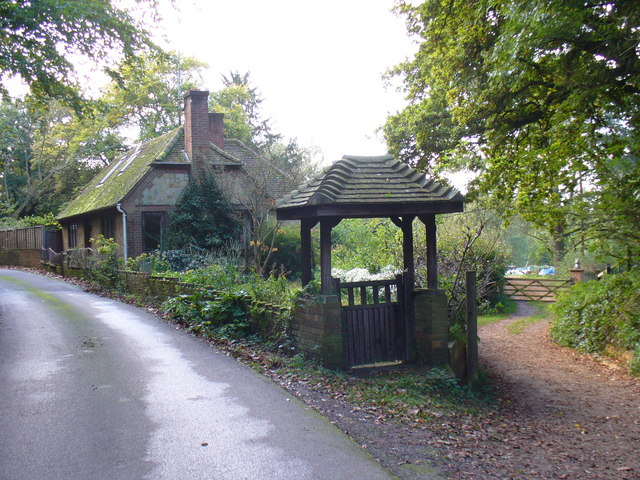
- Milton Heath
- Interactive map of Milton Heath and The Nower
- Type: Nature reserve
- Location: Dorking, Surrey
- OS grid: TQ156486
- Area: 16 hectares (40 acres)

Milton Heath and The Nower is a 16-hectare (40-acre) nature reserve west of Dorking in Surrey. It is owned by Mole Valley District Council.

This site has woodland, heath and grassland. Birds include green woodpeckers, great spotted woodpeckers, tawny owls, nuthatches and treecreepers.

There is access from Westcott Road.
