= Talich =

Talich is a surname of Czech origin. Notable people with the surname include:

- Jan Talich (born 1967), Czech violinist and conductor
- Luke Talich, American football player
- Václav Talich (1883–1961), Czech conductor, violinist and pedagogue

== See also ==
- Talich Quartet, Czech string quartet
- 11201 Talich main-belt asteroid
