= Great Wood, Wiltshire =

Nature reserve in Wiltshire, England

Great Wood
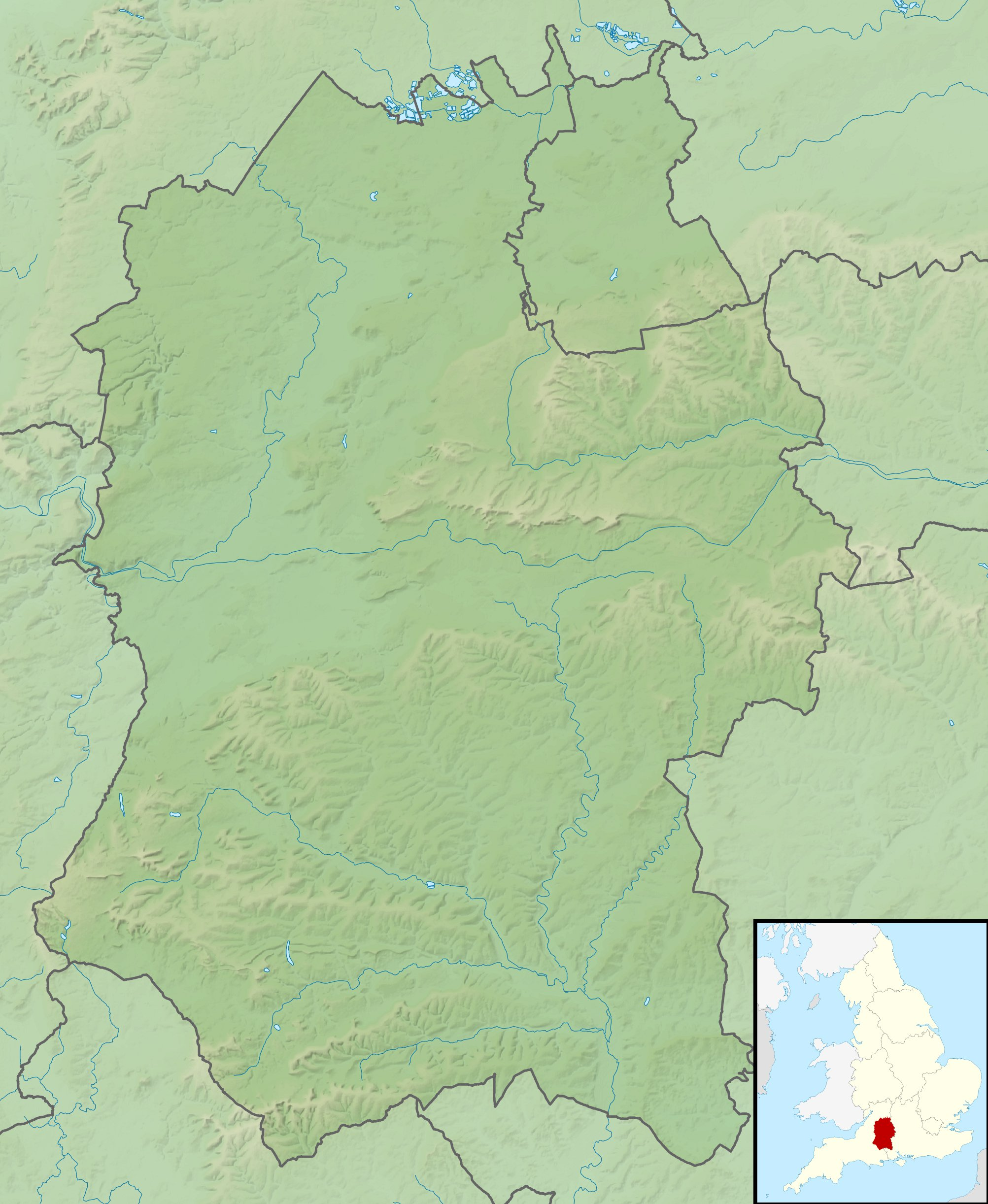
- Location within Wiltshire
- Type: Nature reserve
- Location: Near Royal Wootton Bassett
- OS grid: SU 020 819
- Coordinates: 51°32′09″N 1°58′11″W
- Area: 71 hectares (180 acres)
- Operator: Wiltshire Wildlife Trust

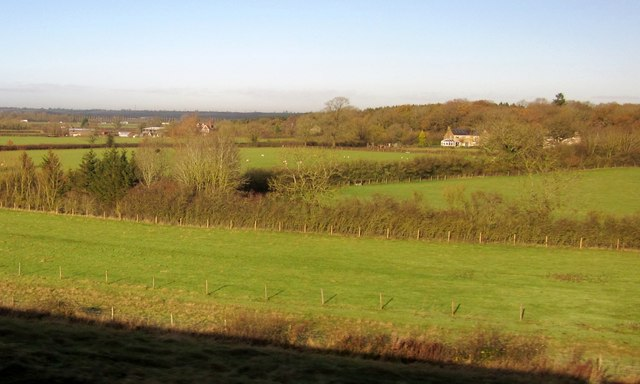

Great Wood is a nature reserve of Wiltshire Wildlife Trust, about 3 miles (4.8 km) west of Royal Wootton Bassett in Wiltshire, England.

== Description ==
The Trust announced the purchase of Great Wood, formerly a commercially managed site, in March 2023. This was achieved with the help of a grant from Biffa Award, and donations. Gary Mantle, chief executive of the Trust, said: "We will restore it to a fully functioning ancient woodland ecosystem, increasing biodiversity whilst ensuring it is more resilient to the impacts of climate change".

Its area is 71 hectares (180 acres); it is one of the twenty largest ancient woodlands in Wiltshire. It contains a great number of wild service trees, and some ancient oak trees.

Restoration involves replacing conifers, formerly covering a third of the wood, with deciduous trees including field maple, hornbeam, rowan and wych elm, that provide a more varied habitat and attract previously absent species. Some areas are opened up to make woodland glades, which some species prefer, and invasive plants are removed. Since ponds in woodlands are habitats for a great variety of wildlife, an existing pond is restored, and a second pond is created. While restoration work is carried out by volunteers, the wood is not open to the public.

It is hoped that the wood will be connected to nearby woods and hedgerows, in cooperation with other landowners, so that it will be part of a wider network of nature recovery.
