= Black Firs Wood Nature Reserve =

Nature reserve in Cheshire, England

Coordinates: 53.1719°N 2.2509°W

Black Firs Wood Nature Reserve is a 1.15-hectare (2.8-acre) nature reserve managed by the Cheshire Wildlife Trust. It is located at Black Firs Lane, Somerford, near Congleton, Cheshire, England, (grid reference SJ834638).

== Description ==
An oak-dominated woodland with a series of marl pits throughout, this reserve can be accessed from a public footpath. A pathway runs the entire length of the wood, leading to a roadway at the far end from which Hogswood Covert can be seen and accessed.
