= Deepdene Terrace =

Nature reserve in Surrey, UK

Coordinates: 51.228°N 0.317°W

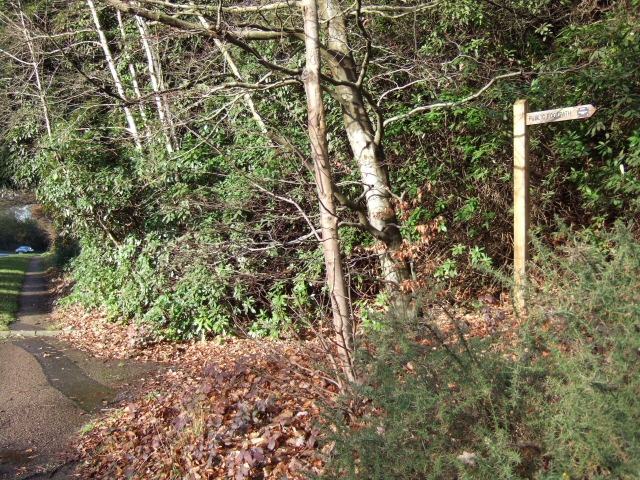
- Interactive map of Deepdene Terrace
- Type: Nature reserve
- Location: Dorking, Surrey
- OS grid: TQ175490
- Area: 4 hectares (9.9 acres)
- Manager: Surrey Wildlife Trust

Deepdene Terrace is a 4-hectare (9.9-acre) nature reserve south-east of Dorking in Surrey. It is owned by Mole Valley District Council and managed by the Surrey Wildlife Trust.

This woodland reserve has an avenue of beech trees and rhododendrons. There are also oaks, sweet chestnuts, yews, common limes and silver birches. The site also has grassland.

There is access from Deepdene Wood and Deepdene Avenue.
