= Uxbridge College Pond =

Coordinates: 51.550745°N 0.468997°W

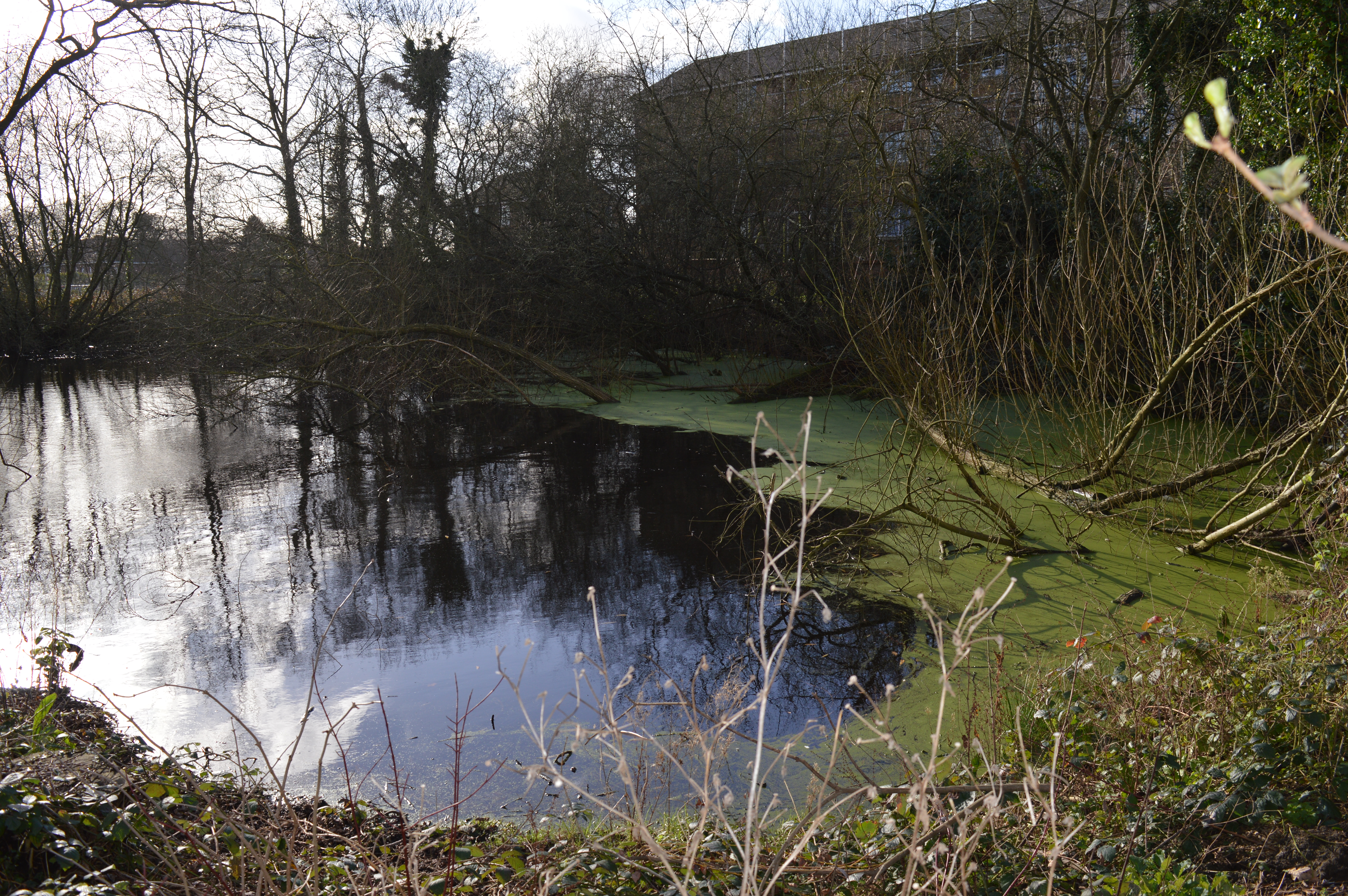

Uxbridge College Pond is a small pond in the grounds of Uxbridge College in Uxbridge in the London Borough of Hillingdon. It is a Site of Borough Importance for Nature Conservation, Grade I.

The pond is shaded by willow trees and sycamores, and it is covered by common duckweed. It has many amphibians, including great crested newts and common frogs.

Access to the site on Park Road is restricted.
