= List of local nature reserves in Lincolnshire =

Lincolnshire is an English ceremonial county consisting of the North Lincolnshire and North East Lincolnshire unitary authorities and the non-metropolitan Lincolnshire County Council, made up of six districts (Boston, East Lindsey, North Kesteven, South Holland, South Kesteven and West Lindsey) and the City of Lincoln. The non-metropolitan county is in the East Midlands, while the two unitary authorities are part of the Yorkshire and Humber region. Bound to the south by Rutland, Northamptonshire and Cambridgeshire, to the south-east by Norfolk and to the west by Leicestershire, Nottinghamshire and South Yorkshire, Lincolnshire's eastern edge follows the coastline with the North Sea and the southern bank of the Humber estuary to the north. The county's area is the fourth largest in England, but its population, at 714,800, is only the 14th highest.

Local nature reserves (LNRs) are designated by local authorities under the National Parks and Access to the Countryside Act 1949. The local authority must have legal control over the site, by owning or leasing it or having an agreement with the owner. LNRs are sites which have a special local interest either biologically or geologically, and local authorities have a duty to care for them. They can apply local bye-laws to manage and protect LNRs. As of January 2018, Lincolnshire has 32 designated Local Nature Reserves.

== Sites ==
Site	Photograph	Area	Location	Declaring authority	Other classifications	Map	Details	Description	Ref
Atkinsons Warren	Atkinson's Warren	32.8 hectares	Ferry Road, Scunthorpe SE 877 121	North Lincolnshire Council					
Axholme Line-Haxey		7.23 hectares	Isle of Axholme, Haxey Village SE 773 005	North Lincolnshire Council					
Bradley and Dixon Woods	Entrance to Bradley Woods	41.77 hectares	South of Grimsby TA 242 058	North East Lincolnshire Council					
Brumby Wood	Brumby Wood	21.84 hectares	Scunthorpe SE 880 103	North Lincolnshire Council					
Cleethorpes Country Park	The lake at Cleethorpes Country Park	62.01 hectares	Between Cleethorpes and Humberston TA 304 067	North East Lincolnshire Council					
Cleethorpes Sands		457.24 hectares	Cleethorpes TA 325 070	North East Lincolnshire Council	Humber Estuary SSSI, Humber Estuary Ramsar, Humber Estuary SAC, Humber Estuary SPA				
Conesby		?	SE 891 146	Lincolnshire County Council					
Cross O'Cliff Orchard		1.70 hectares	Off Cross O'Cliff Hill, Lincoln SK 975 688	Lincolnshire County Council					
Far Ings		15.15 hectares	Barton-upon-Humber TA 010 228	North Lincolnshire Council					
Frodingham Railway Cutting		1.73 hectares	Scunthorpe SE 889 106	North Lincolnshire Council					
Havenside		18.91 hectares	Fishtoft TF 350 415	Boston Borough Council					
Lollycocks Field	Lollycocks Pond, Lollycocks Field	2.15 hectares	Sleaford TF 074 459	North Kesteven District Council					
Mareham Pastures		11.00 hectares	Sleaford TF 073 446	Lincolnshire County Council					
Owlet Plantation		50.28 hectares	Blyton SK 829 952	Lincolnshire County Council					
Owston Ferry Castle	Ruins of Owston Ferry Castle	0.90 hectares	Owston Ferry SE 804 002	North Lincolnshire Council					
Phoenix		24.10 hectares	SE 878 140						
Phoenix Parkway		20.81 hectares	Scunthorpe SE 880 133	North Lincolnshire District Council					
Red Hill		2.87 hectares	Goulceby TF 264 877	Lincolnshire County Council					
Sawcliffe		14.86 hectares	Scunthorpe SE 903 132	North Lincolnshire Council					
Silica Lodge		9.49 hectares	Scunthorpe SE 876 078	North Lincolnshire Council					
Snipe Dales	Snipe Dales	82.16 hectares	Lusby with Winceby (near Hagworthingham) F 319 683	Lincolnshire County Council					
South Thoresby Warren		12.43 hectares	South Thoresby TF 394 762	Lincolnshire County Council					
Stanton's Pit	Stanton's Pit	8.05 hectares	Little Bytham TF 032 174	Lincolnshire County Council					
Swanholme Lakes		52.51 hectares	Lincoln SK 944 685	City of Lincoln Council					
The Pingle		3.42 hectares	Coningsby TF 230 854	East Lindsey District Council					
The Shrubberies		4.39 hectares	Long Sutton TF 425 234	Lincolnshire County Council					
Theaker Avenue		2.25 hectares	Gainsborough SK 830 903	West Lindsey District Council					
Vernatts Drain		1.68 hectares	Spalding TF 249 240	South Holland District Council					
Water's Edge Country Park		41.46 hectares	Barton-upon-Humber TA 030 231	North Lincolnshire Council					
Weelsby Woods Park		34.7 hectares	Grimsby TA 285 076	North East Lincolnshire Council					
Whisby Nature Park		107.57 hectares	Thorpe-on-the-Hill SK 912 662	North Kesteven District Council					
Willoughby Branch Line		6.24 hectares	Willoughby TF 472 734	Lincolnshire County Council					
