= List of Sites of Special Scientific Interest in Lincolnshire =

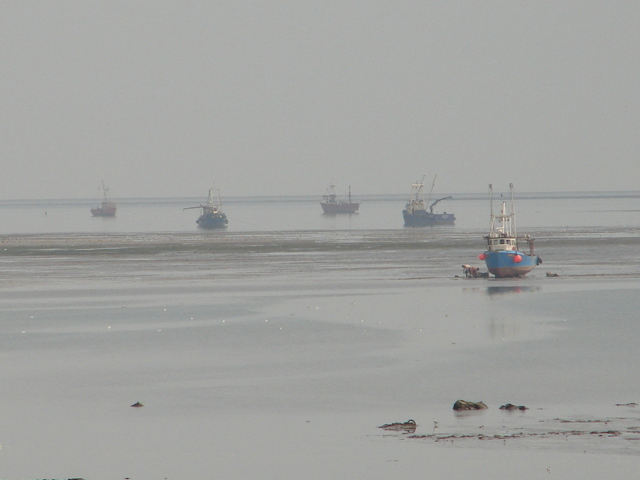
The Wash on the Lincolnshire coast east of Boston

This is a list of Sites of Special Scientific Interest (SSSIs) in Lincolnshire. This list includes sites within the ceremonial county of Lincolnshire, covering the two unitary authorities North Lincolnshire and North East Lincolnshire as well as the rest of the county administered by Lincolnshire County Council.

This list features 98 SSSIs notable for their biology, 23 notable for their geology and three notable for both. Six of the SSSIs include national nature reserves, four are Ramsar Wetland sites, and five are EU Special Protection Areas.

For other counties, see List of SSSIs by Area of Search.

== Sites ==
| Site name | Reason for designation | | Area | | Location & map ref | Year in which notified | Other designations | Map/Refs |
| Site name | Biological interest | Geological interest | Hectares | Acres | Location & map ref | Year in which notified | Other designations | Map/Refs |
|---|---|---|---|---|---|---|---|---|
| Allington Meadows | ✓ | | 3.8 | 9.3 | 52.948°N 0.707°W; SK870397 | 1987 | | Map |
| Ancaster Valley | ✓ | | 10.3 | 25.4 | 52.975°N 0.533°W; SK986430 | 1951 | WT, NCR | Map |
| Bardney Limewoods | ✓ | | 539.8 | 1,333.9 | 53.247°N 0.285°W; TF145736 | 1959 | NNR, NCR, | Map |
| Baston And Thurlby Fens | ✓ | | 54.6 | 134.9 | 52.736°N 0.335°W; TF125167 | 1968 | WT, NCR, SAC | Map |
| Belshaw | ✓ | | 0.2 | 0.5 | 53.544°N 0.842°W; SE768059 | 1988 | | Map |
| Benniworth Haven Cuttings | | ✓ | 2.4 | 5.9 | 53.324°N 0.162°W; TF225824 | 1966 | GCR | Map |
| Bratoft Meadows | ✓ | | 2.3 | 5.6 | 53.152°N 0.218°E; TF484639 | 1968 | WT, NCR | Map |
| Broughton Alder Wood | ✓ | | 0.8 | 2 | 53.577°N 0.552°W; SE960099 | 1986 | | Map |
| Broughton Far Wood | ✓ | | 17.8 | 44 | 53.583°N 0.551°W; SE960106 | 1957 | | Map |
| Calceby Marsh | ✓ | | 8.8 | 21.8 | 53.273°N 0.094°E; TF397772 | 1970 | WT, NCR | Map |
| Candlesby Hill Quarry | ✓ | | 1.8 | 4.5 | 53.191°N 0.184°E; TF460682 | 1966 | WT | Map |
| Castle Bytham Quarry | | ✓ | 5.5 | 13.6 | 52.75°N 0.536°W; SK989179 | 1981 | GCR | Map |
| Castlethorpe Tufas | | ✓ | 0.5 | 1.3 | 53.557°N 0.525°W; SE978077 | 1989 | GCR | Map |
| Chapel Point-wolla Bank | | ✓ | 39.7 | 98.0 | 53.242°N 0.336°E; TF560742 | 2002 | GCR | Map |
| Claxby Chalk Pit | ✓ | ✓ | 2.2 | 5.5 | 53.223°N 0.17°E; TF450717 | 1968 | GCR, WT | Map |
| Cleatham Quarry | ✓ | | 5.8 | 14.2 | 53.501°N 0.584°W; SE940014 | 1986 | | Map |
| Cliff Farm Pit | | ✓ | 1.1 | 2.8 | 53.495°N 0.583°W; SE941008 | 1985 | GCR | Map |
| Cliff House | ✓ | | 4.8 | 11.7 | 53.446°N 0.549°W; SK965953 | 1966 | | Map |
| Copper Hill | | ✓ | 6.6 | 16.4 | 52.972°N 0.545°W; SK978426 | 1950 | GCR | Map |
| Conesby (Yorkshire East) Quarry | | ✓ | 0.9 | 2.2 | 53.622°N 0.636°W; SE903148 | 1995 | GCR | Map |
| Cowbit Wash | | ✓ | 9.1 | 22.4 | 52.755°N 0.164°W; TF240191 | 1999 | GCR | Map |
| Cross Drain | ✓ | | 5.7 | 14.2 | 52.709°N 0.284°W; TF160137 | 1991 | | Map |
| Crowle Borrow Pits | ✓ | | 4.9 | 12.2 | 53.586°N 0.808°W; SE790106 | 1986 | | Map |
| Dalby Hill | | ✓ | 0.2 | 0.5 | 53.204°N 0.107°E; TF408695 | 1986 | GCR | Map |
| Deeping Gravel Pits | ✓ | | 57.6 | 142.3 | 52.659°N 0.26°W; TF178082 | 1968 | Wildlife refuge | Map |
| Doddington Clay Woods | ✓ | | 23.9 | 59.0 | 53.228°N 0.652°W; SK901710 | 1987 | | Map |
| Dole Wood | ✓ | | 4.0 | 9.8 | 52.732°N 0.386°W; TF091161 | 1968 | WT | Map |
| Dunsby Wood | ✓ | | 54.6 | 134.8 | 52.82°N 0.385°W; TF089259 | 1968 | | Map |
| Eastoft Meadow | ✓ | | 0.8 | 2.1 | 53.618°N 0.813°W; SE786142 | 1985 | | Map |
| Epworth Turbary | ✓ | | 32.9 | 81.3 | 53.526°N 0.864°W; SE754039 | 1951 | WT | Map |
| Fulsby Wood | ✓ | | 109.3 | 270.0 | 53.134°N 0.124°W; TF256613 | 1986 | | Map |
| Gibraltar Point | ✓ | | 598.2 | 1,478.3 | 53.103°N 0.333°E; TF563587 | 1951 | Bird sanctuary, SPA, GCR, LNR, WT, NNR, NCR, Ramsar site, SAC | Map |
| Gosling's Corner | ✓ | | 10.2 | 25.1 | 53.262°N 0.289°W; TF142752 | 1988 | | Map |
| Great Casterton Road Banks | ✓ | | 0.4 | 1 | 52.663°N 0.515°W; TF005083 | 1959 | WT | Map |
| Greetwell Hollow Quarry | | ✓ | 59.3 | 146.6 | 53.236°N 0.497°W; TF004721 | 1951 | GCR | Map |
| Grimsthorpe Park | ✓ | | 116.4 | 287.7 | 52.763°N 0.487°W; TF022194 | 1969 | SAC, | Map |
| Hainton Sheepwalk | ✓ | | 2.5 | 6.3 | 53.359°N 0.222°W; TF184861 | 1989 | | Map |
| Harrington Hall Sand Pit | | ✓ | 0.1 | 0.2 | 53.227°N 0.037°E; TF361719 | 1986 | GCR | Map |
| Hatfield Chase Ditches | ✓ | | 44.2 | 109.2 | 53.542°N 0.888°W; SE738056 | 1999 | | Map |
| Haxey Grange Fen | ✓ | | 13.3 | 32.8 | 53.466°N 0.89°W; SK738972 | 1988 | | Map |
| Haxey Turbary | ✓ | | 14.4 | 35.6 | 53.508°N 0.874°W; SE748018 | 1951 | WT | Map |
| Hewson's Field | ✓ | | 0.5 | 1.2 | 53.486°N 0.818°W; SK785995 | 1991 | | Map |
| High Barn, Oxcombe | ✓ | | 8.3 | 20.4 | 53.271°N 0.021°W; TF321767 | 1966 | | Map |
| High Dyke | ✓ | | 6.8 | 16.7 | 53.041°N 0.525°W; SK990503 | 1951 | | Map |
| Holywell Banks | ✓ | | 6.1 | 15.1 | 52.73°N 0.529°W; SK994157 | 1951 | | Map |
| Honington Camp | ✓ | | 1.4 | 3.5 | 52.97°N 0.581°W; SK954423 | 1968 | SAM | Map |
| Hoplands Wood | ✓ | | 14.2 | 35.0 | 53.221°N 0.184°E; TF459715 | 1966 | WT | Map |
| Horbling Fen | | ✓ | 15.1 | 37.3 | 52.902°N 0.29°W; TF151352 | 1999 | GCR | Map |
| Humber Estuary | ✓ | ✓ | 37,000.6 | 91,430.5 | 53.578°N 0.03°E; TA345110 | 2004 | SPA, GCR, MOD, NNR, Ramsar site, SAC | Map |
| Hundleby Clay Pit | | ✓ | 0.8 | 1.9 | 53.173°N 0.066°E; TF382660 | 1986 | GCR, | Map |
| Jenkins Carr | ✓ | | 3.7 | 9.1 | 53.156°N 0.073°E; TF387641 | 1966 | | Map |
| Keal Carr | ✓ | | 9.4 | 23.1 | 53.162°N 0.066°E; TF382648 | 1968 | WT | Map |
| Kingerby Beck Meadows | ✓ | | 5.5 | 13.6 | 53.428°N 0.418°W; TF052935 | 1988 | | Map |
| Kirkby Moor | ✓ | | 73.6 | 181.9 | 53.144°N 0.17°W; TF225623 | 1966 | WT, | Map |
| Kirmington Pits | | ✓ | 9.1 | 22.5 | 53.589°N 0.335°W; TA103116 | 1951 | GCR | Map |
| Kirton Wood, Lincolnshire | ✓ | | 30.3 | 74.9 | 52.882°N 0.545°W; SK980326 | 1968 | NCR | Map |
| Langtoft Gravel Pits | ✓ | | 28.4 | 70.3 | 52.684°N 0.356°W; TF112109 | 1968 | | Map |
| Laughton Common | ✓ | | 54.7 | 135.2 | 53.46°N 0.741°W; SK837967 | 1999 | | Map |
| Lea Marsh | ✓ | | 27.6 | 68.1 | 53.374°N 0.772°W; SK818870 | 1998 | | Map |
| Linwood Warren | ✓ | | 25.7 | 63.5 | 53.372°N 0.302°W; TF131875 | 1966 | WT | Map |
| Little Scrubbs Meadow | ✓ | | 2.0 | 4.9 | 53.253°N 0.284°W; TF146743 | 1988 | WT | Map |
| Manton and Twigmoor | ✓ | | 88.9 | 219.6 | 53.526°N 0.583°W; SE940042 | 1951 | | Map |
| Manton Stone Quarry | | ✓ | 17.5 | 43.2 | 53.51°N 0.584°W; SE940024 | 1986 | GCR | Map |
| Math And Elsea Wood | ✓ | | 44.2 | 109.3 | 52.751°N 0.376°W; TF097183 | 1988 | | Map |
| Mavis Enderby Valley | ✓ | | 15.7 | 38.8 | 53.181°N 0.038°E; TF363668 | 1988 | | Map |
| Messingham Heath | ✓ | | 17.8 | 43.9 | 53.519°N 0.682°W; SE875033 | 1965 | | Map |
| Messingham Sand Quarry | ✓ | | 51.8 | 128 | 53.52°N 0.626°W; SE912035 | 1987 | WT | Map |
| Metheringham Heath Quarry | | ✓ | 12.8 | 31.5 | 53.14°N 0.427°W; TF053615 | 1981 | GCR | Map |
| Moor Closes | ✓ | | 6.8 | 16.8 | 52.983°N 0.542°W; SK980438 | 1968 | WT, NCR, | Map |
| Moor Farm | ✓ | | 47.0 | 116.1 | 53.157°N 0.175°W; TF221638 | 1981 | WT | Map |
| Muckton Wood | ✓ | | 16.7 | 41.3 | 53.309°N 0.071°E; TF381811 | 1953 | WT | Map |
| Nettleton Chalk Pit | | ✓ | 8.1 | 20.0 | 53.468°N 0.307°W; TF125981 | 1968 | GCR | Map |
| New England Valley | ✓ | | 6.3 | 15.7 | 53.242°N 0.001°E; TF336735 | 1966 | | Map |
| Normanby Meadow | ✓ | | 4.2 | 10.3 | 53.391°N 0.459°W; TF026893 | 2002 | | Map |
| North Killingholme Haven Pits | ✓ | | 21.6 | 53.4 | 53.661°N 0.237°W; TA166197 | 1996 | WT, SPA | Map |
| Porter's Lodge Meadows | ✓ | | 9.6 | 23.8 | 52.765°N 0.577°W; SK961196 | 1988 | | Map |
| Potterhanworth Wood | ✓ | | 33.1 | 81.7 | 53.188°N 0.397°W; TF072668 | 1968 | Forest nature reserve, NCR | Map |
| Red Hill | ✓ | | 3.0 | 7.5 | 53.308°N 0.104°W; TF264807 | 1951 | LNR, WT, | Map |
| Robert's Field | ✓ | | 3.0 | 7.5 | 52.723°N 0.5208°W; TF000150 | | LNR, WT, | |
| Risby Warren | ✓ | ✓ | 157.1 | 388.2 | 53.61°N 0.609°W; SE921135 | 1966 | GCR, NCR, | Map |
| Rush Furlong | ✓ | | 0.5 | 1.2 | 53.495°N 0.826°W; SE780004 | 1985 | WT | Map |
| Ryhall Pasture and Little Warren Verges | ✓ | | 6.2 | 15.4 | 52.712°N 0.495°W; TF018138 | 1983 | | Map |
| Saltfleetby-Theddlethorpe Dunes National Nature Reserve | ✓ | | 971.9 | 2,401.5 | 53.399°N 0.225°E; TF480914 | 1951 | NNR, NCR, SAC | Map |
| Sapperton & Pickworth Woods | ✓ | | 28.1 | 69.3 | 52.895°N 0.472°W; TF029342 | 1968 | | Map |
| Scotton And Laughton Forest Ponds | ✓ | | 48.3 | 119.4 | 53.483°N 0.706°W; SK860992 | 1959 | | Map |
| Scotton Beck Fields | ✓ | | 16.8 | 41.4 | 53.479°N 0.682°W; SK876988 | 1987 | | Map |
| Scotton Common | ✓ | | 15.1 | 37.3 | 53.475°N 0.692°W; SK869984 | 1951 | WT, | Map |
| Sea Bank Clay Pits | ✓ | | 16.6 | 40.9 | 53.288°N 0.297°E; TF532792 | 1959 | WT, | Map |
| Silverines Meadows | ✓ | | 6.2 | 15.3 | 53.291°N 0.111°W; TF260788 | 1959 | WT | Map |
| Skendleby Psalter Banks | ✓ | | 0.9 | 2.2 | 53.222°N 0.155°E; TF440716 | 1966 | WT | Map |
| Sotby Meadows | ✓ | | 7.2 | 17.8 | 53.284°N 0.197°W; TF203779 | 1981 | WT | Map |
| South Ferriby Chalk Pit | | ✓ | 85 | 209.9 | 53.667°N 0.486°W; TA001200 | 1987 | GCR | Map |
| Surfleet Lows | ✓ | | 3.4 | 8.5 | 52.84°N 0.144°W; TF251286 | 1968 | WT | Map |
| Swaby Valley | ✓ | | 3.4 | 8.4 | 53.277°N 0.085°E; TF391776 | 1966 | WT | Map |
| Swallow Wold | ✓ | | 4.3 | 10.6 | 53.527°N 0.24°W; TA168048 | 1966 | | Map |
| Swanholme Lakes | ✓ | | 53.1 | 131.3 | 53.205°N 0.59°W; SK943685 | 1985 | LNR, NCR | Map |
| Swinstead Valley | ✓ | | 8.9 | 22.0 | 52.79°N 0.51°W; TF006224 | 1989 | | Map |
| Tattershall Carrs | ✓ | | 26.6 | 65.7 | 53.113°N 0.185°W; TF216589 | 1968 | | Map |
| Tattershall Old Gravel Pits | ✓ | | 14.5 | 35.9 | 53.119°N 0.213°W; TF197595 | 1951 | | Map |
| Tetford Wood | ✓ | | 5.4 | 13.3 | 53.263°N 0.007°W; TF330758 | 1951 | | Map |
| Tetney Blow Wells | ✓ | | 14.7 | 36.4 | 53.486°N 0.012°W; TA320006 | 1968 | WT | Map |
| The Hermitage | ✓ | | 4.4 | 10.9 | 52.827°N 0.504°W; TF009265 | 1968 | SAM | Map |
| The Wash | ✓ | | 62,045.8 | 153,318.5 | 52.941°N 0.253°E; TF515405 | 1972 | SPA, WT, NNR, NCR, Ramsar site, RSPB | Map |
| Thorne Crowle and Goole Moors | ✓ | | 1919 | 4742.1 | 53.633°N 0.901°W; SE728157 | 1970 | SPA, WT, NNR, NCR, Ramsar site, SAC | Map |
| Tortoiseshell Wood | ✓ | | 9.3 | 22.9 | 52.768°N 0.576°W; SK962199 | 1987 | WT, NCR | Map |
| Troy Wood | ✓ | | 91.1 | 225.1 | 53.112°N 0.138°W; TF247588 | 1951 | | Map |
| Tuetoes Hills | ✓ | | 12.5 | 30.8 | 53.503°N 0.729°W; SE844014 | 1999 | | Map |
| Welton-le-wold Old Gravel Pits | | ✓ | 3.4 | 8.4 | 53.377°N 0.077°W; TF280884 | 1986 | GCR | Map |
| Wickenby Wood | ✓ | | 43.6 | 107.6 | 53.33°N 0.381°W; TF079827 | 1976 | Forest nature reserve, NCR | Map |
| Willoughby Meadow | ✓ | | 0.5 | 1.3 | 53.217°N 0.203°E; TF472712 | 1968 | WT | Map |
| Willoughby Wood | ✓ | | 23.2 | 57.4 | 53.213°N 0.186°E; TF461707 | 1951 | | Map |
| Wilsford & Rauceby Warrens | ✓ | | 57.4 | 141.9 | 52.979°N 0.467°W; TF030435 | 1968 | WT | Map |
| Wilsford Heath Quarry | ✓ | | 16.2 | 40.0 | 52.96°N 0.534°W; SK986413 | 1968 | | Map |
| Winceby Rectory Pit | | ✓ | <0.1 | 0.1 | 53.197°N 0.025°W; TF320685 | 1987 | GCR | Map |
| Withcall And South Willingham Tunnels | ✓ | | 3.8 | 9.4 | 53.328°N 0.18°W; TF213828 | 2002 | | Map |
| Woodhall Spa Golf Course | ✓ | | 55.0 | 135.8 | 53.162°N 0.192°W; TF210643 | 1969 | | Map |
| Woodnook Valley | ✓ | | 9.7 | 23.8 | 52.88°N 0.612°W; SK935323 | 1968 | | Map |
| Wrawby Moor | ✓ | | 18.5 | 45.6 | 53.585°N 0.444°W; TA031109 | 1966 | | Map |

== See also ==
- List of SSSIs by Area of Search
- List of ancient woods in England
- Lincolnshire Wildlife Trust
