= Clapgate =

Type of gate

A clapgate (also clapyates) is a kind of gate which opened onto a waste or common land which allowed the animals going onto the common to push it open but which automatically shut so that they could not get out. This feature has given its name to a number of locations in England.

== Places called Clapgate ==
- Clapgate Pits (Lincolnshire Wildlife Trust)
- Landseer Park: there is a clapgate marked as being where Clapgate Lane reaches Landseer Park
- Woolaston: O. G. S. Crawford argues that turning Clapyates into Clap-Y-Ates showed the "misplaced ingenuity of some amateur philologist" as the term has no meaning in Welsh or any other language.
