= Barrow Haven Reedbed =

Nature reserve in Lincolnshire, England

Barrow Haven Reedbeds
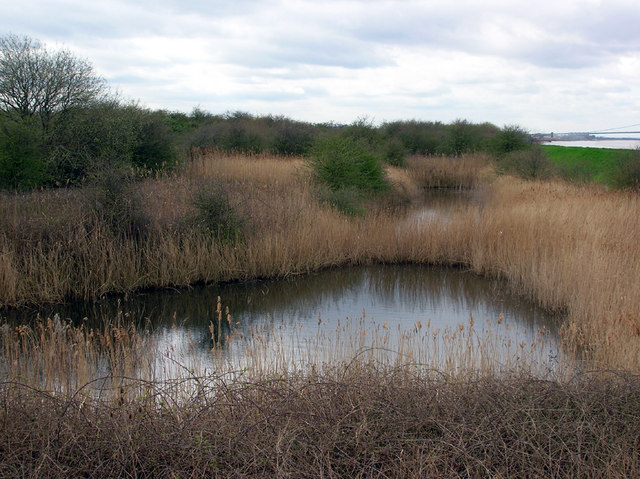

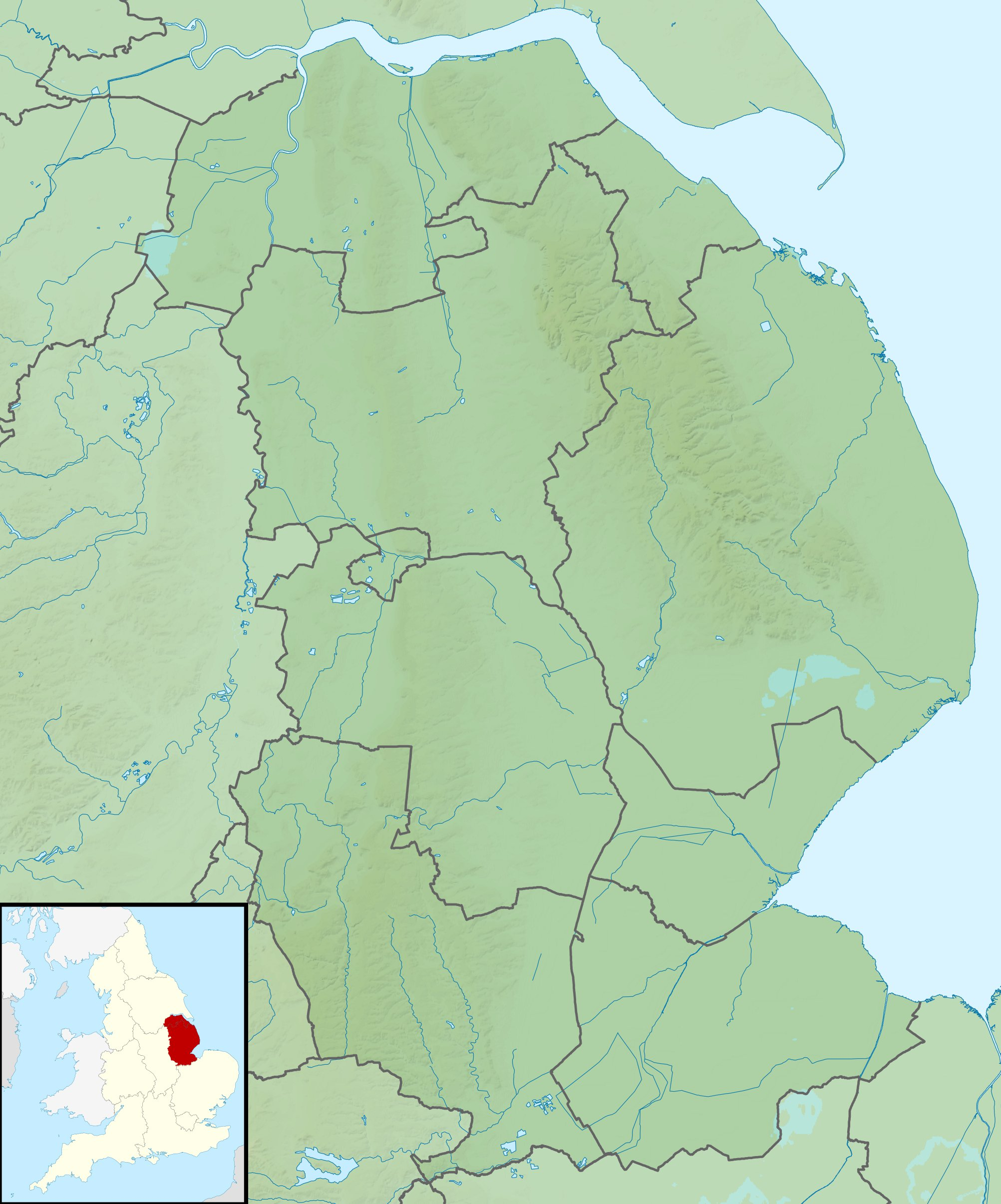
- Location within Lincolnshire
- Interactive map of Barrow Haven Reedbeds
- Type: Local Nature Reserve
- Location: Barrow Haven, North Lincolnshire, England
- OS grid: TA061236
- Coordinates: 53.698528°N 0.39524726°W
- Area: 12.7 hectares (31 acres)
- Manager: Lincolnshire Wildlife Trust

Barrow Haven Reedbeds is a local nature reserve with an area of over 12.7 ha (31 acres) located in Barrow-upon-Humber, North Lincolnshire, England.

It is one of the most important of the flooded former clay pits on the Humber bank: Over 150 species of birds have been recorded from the site.
