= Castle Bytham Quarry =

Disused quarry in Lincolnshire, England

Coordinates: 52.7507°N 0.5348°W

Castle Bytham quarry is a disused quarry located close to the centre of the village of Castle Bytham, Lincolnshire, England. It is famous for the exposure of Laeviuscula Zone ammonite fauna has allowed the dating of the Upper Lincolnshire limestone formation to the Bajocian era, and thereby dating other deposits around Europe.

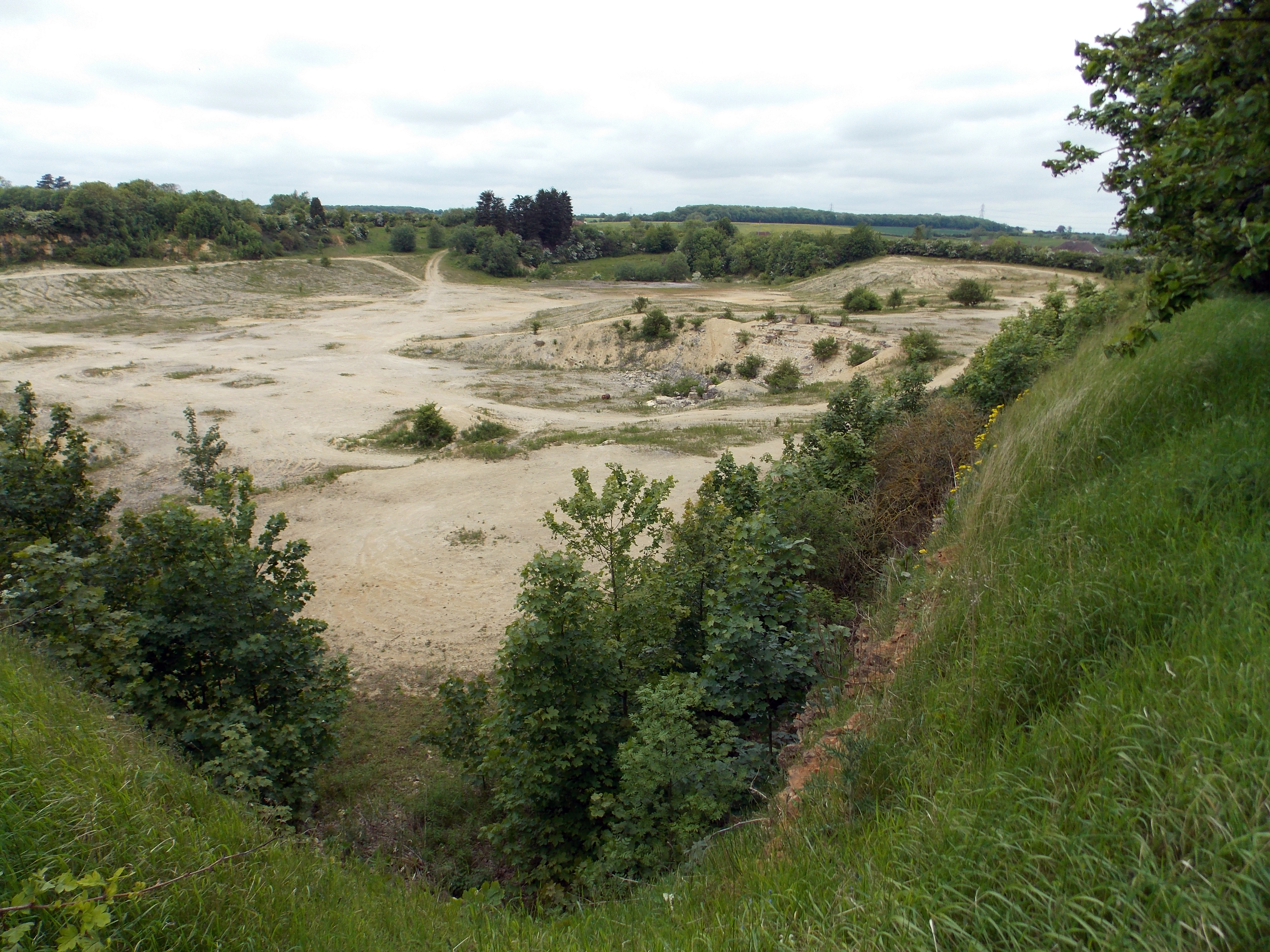
Looking down into Castle Bytham Quarry from the south corner

When the quarry was opened in the 1850s a Bronze Age arrowhead and a Saxon burial were found in the overburden.

Although Ironstone quarrying was common to the west and north, this quarry was worked for Limestone. A kiln adjacent to the railway line was used to produce slaked lime for the agricultural trade and a small amount of cement. The quarry was worked by the Castle Lime company.

The quarry has been left to return to nature since its closure and is now a recognised Site of Special Scientific Interest or SSSI. It has most recently been used as a temporary car park for the annual Castle Bytham Mid-Summer Fair but is otherwise unused. The present owner of the quarry made efforts in 2004 to turn the quarry into an industrial complex of offices and small industrial units.

Thunderbolt Pit, The small quarry to the North of the Little Bytham road, just past the former railway bridge, is in another small outcrop of the same stratification, on the other side of the river. It was not operated by Castle Lime.

== See also ==
- List of Sites of Special Scientific Interest in Lincolnshire
- List of types of limestone
