= Winifred Heath =

Nurse and naturalist

Winifred Heath (24 December 1892 – 22 August 1988) was an English nurse and naturalist.

== Biography ==
Heath was born in the Lickey Hills, Worcestershire. She became a student nurse in London before travelling to India as a missionary nurse. After returning to the UK she worked as a district nurse in Chesterton, Cambridge before moving to Nettleham.

Heath was a long-standing member of the Lincolnshire Naturalists' Union. She was an honorary life-member of the LNU and at the time of her death was its oldest member. She spent much of her retirement fundraising for the Lincolnshire Wildlife Trust and in her honour a nature reserve, formerly Bratoft Meadows, was renamed Heath's Meadows. Heath's Meadows are a grassland meadow site near Burgh le Marsh covering 5.5 hectares (14 acres). She was a volunteer for the RSPCA, the Donkey Sanctuary and the Lincolnshire branch of the Council for the Protection of Rural England.
