= Baston Fen =

Nature reserve in Lincolnshire, England

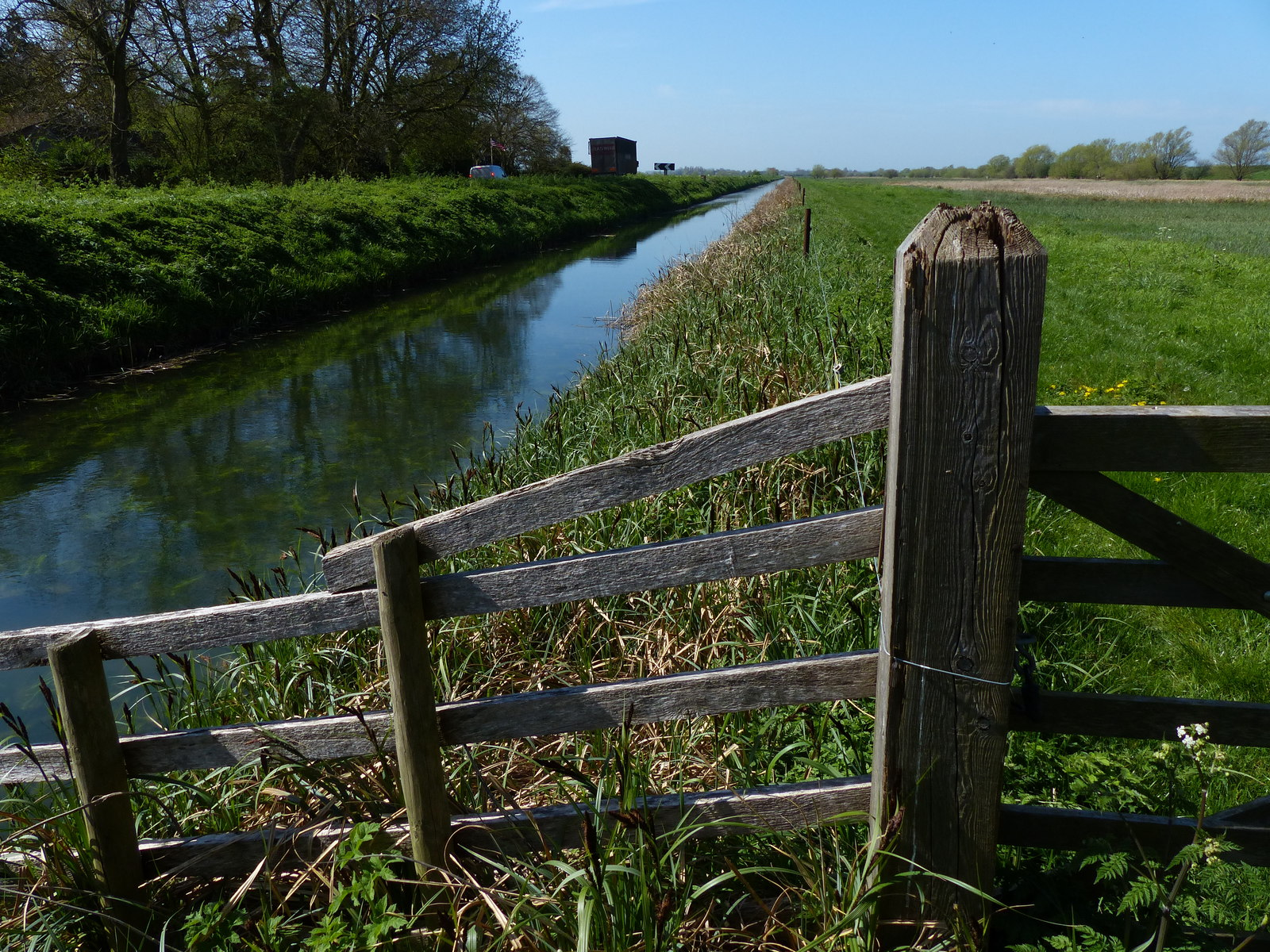
- A counter drain in the reserve

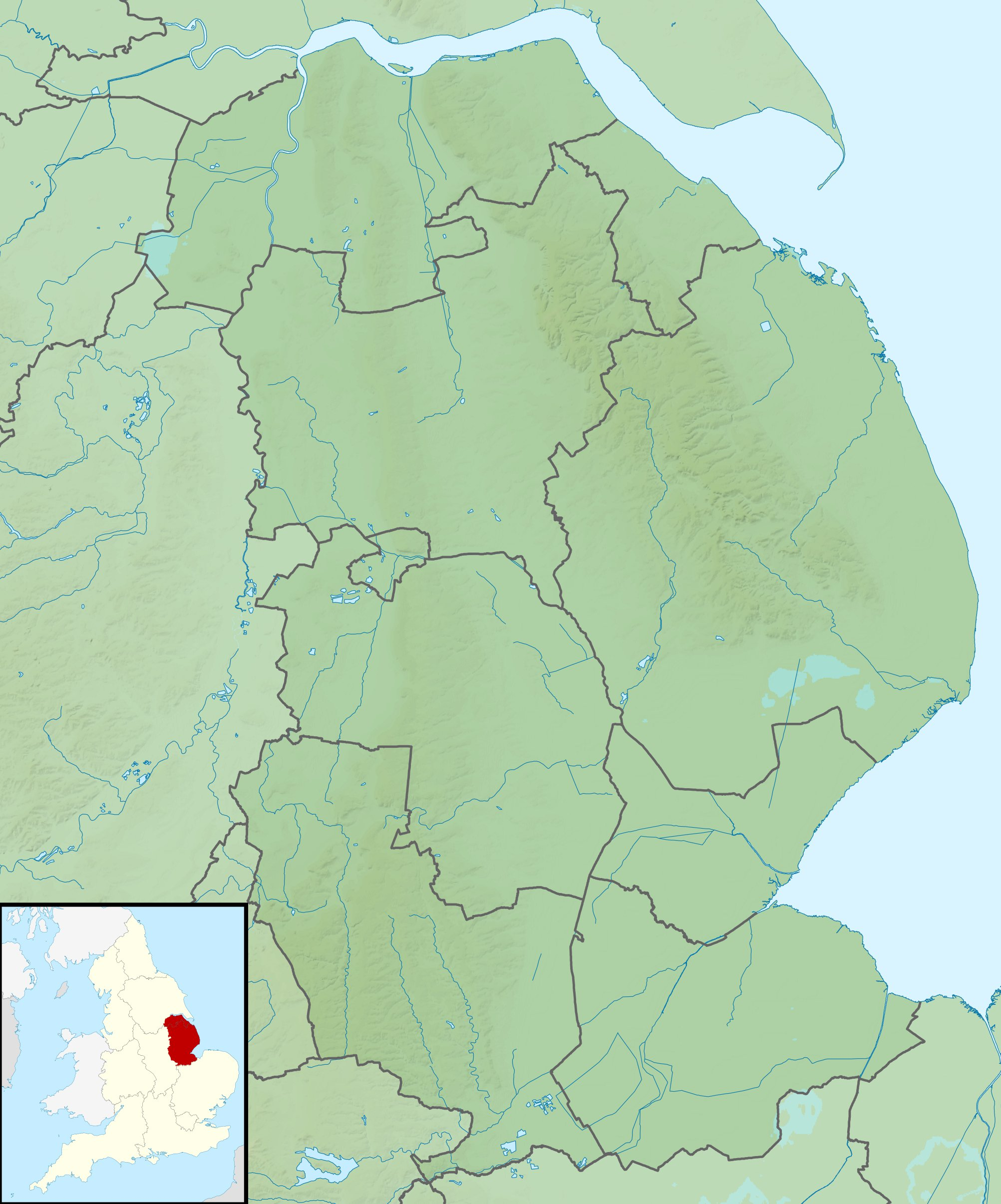
- Location within Lincolnshire
- Interactive map of Baston Fen
- OS grid: TF 145 176
- Coordinates: 52°44′38″N 0°18′19″W
- Area: 33 hectares (82 acres)
- Operator: Lincolnshire Wildlife Trust
- Designation: Special Area of Conservation; Site of Special Scientific Interest
- Website: www.lincstrust.org.uk/nature-reserves/baston-fen

Baston Fen is nature reserve of the Lincolnshire Wildlife Trust, near the village of Baston and about 5 miles (8 km) north of Market Deeping, in Lincolnshire, England. It is uncultivated fenland, which is a habitat for particular plants and wildlife.

== Description ==
The area of the reserve is 33 hectares (82 acres). It is designated a Special Area of Conservation, and a Site of Special Scientific Interest.

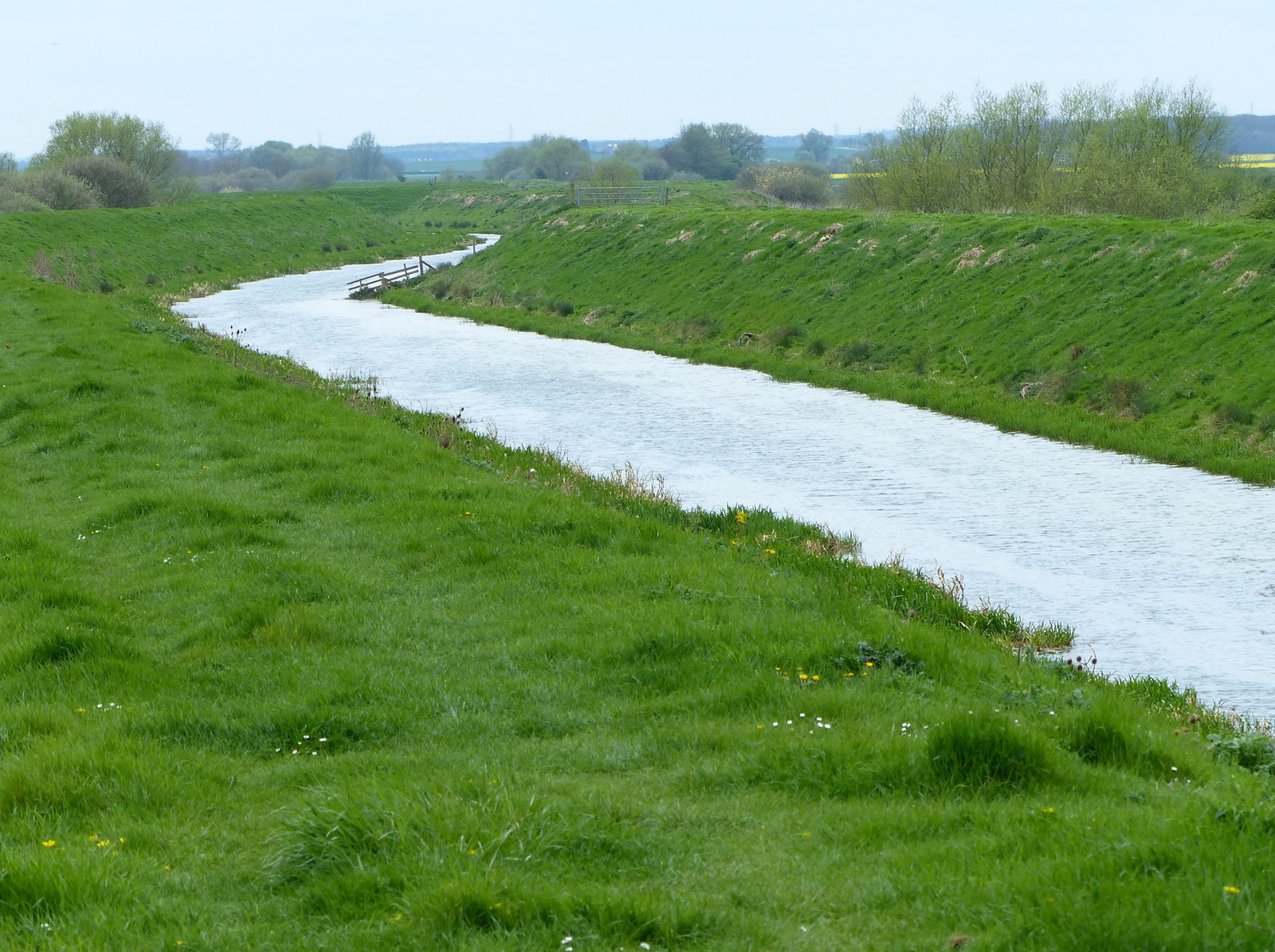
The River Glen in the reserve

It is the largest remaining area of wet fenland in Lincolnshire, and is the only uncultivated part of the Counter Drain Washes. It is permanent pasture where cattle graze in the summer, and which is flooded in winter.

There is a willow carr near the entrance to the reserve, which is a nesting site for birds.

A waymarked route along the River Glen passes three washes. The first wash has a high water table, where sedge grows; here, and in the second wash, meres excavated from the peat attract wildfowl in summer.

=== Plants and wildlife ===
Over 300 species of plants have been recorded in the reserve. Purple loosestrife, water plantain and marsh marigold are among species that grow at the edges of the meres. Other species in the reserve include greater bladderwort, water violet and greater spearwort.

Over 160 species of birds have been recorded. Shoveller, tufted duck and sedge warbler are seen in the breeding season. Flocks of wildfowl, including mute swan, mallard and wigeon, are seen in winter.

In summer, many species of dragonfly and damselfly can be seen.
