= Willow Tree Fen =

Nature reserve in Lincolnshire, England

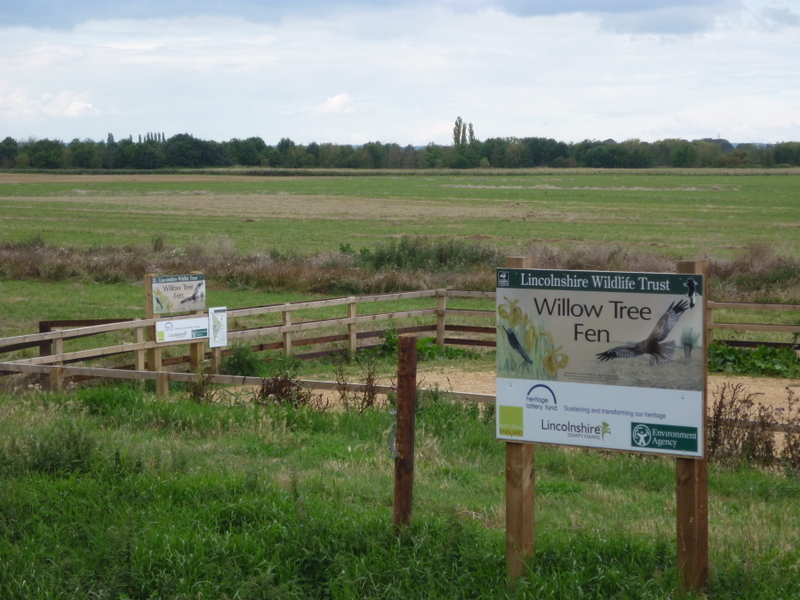

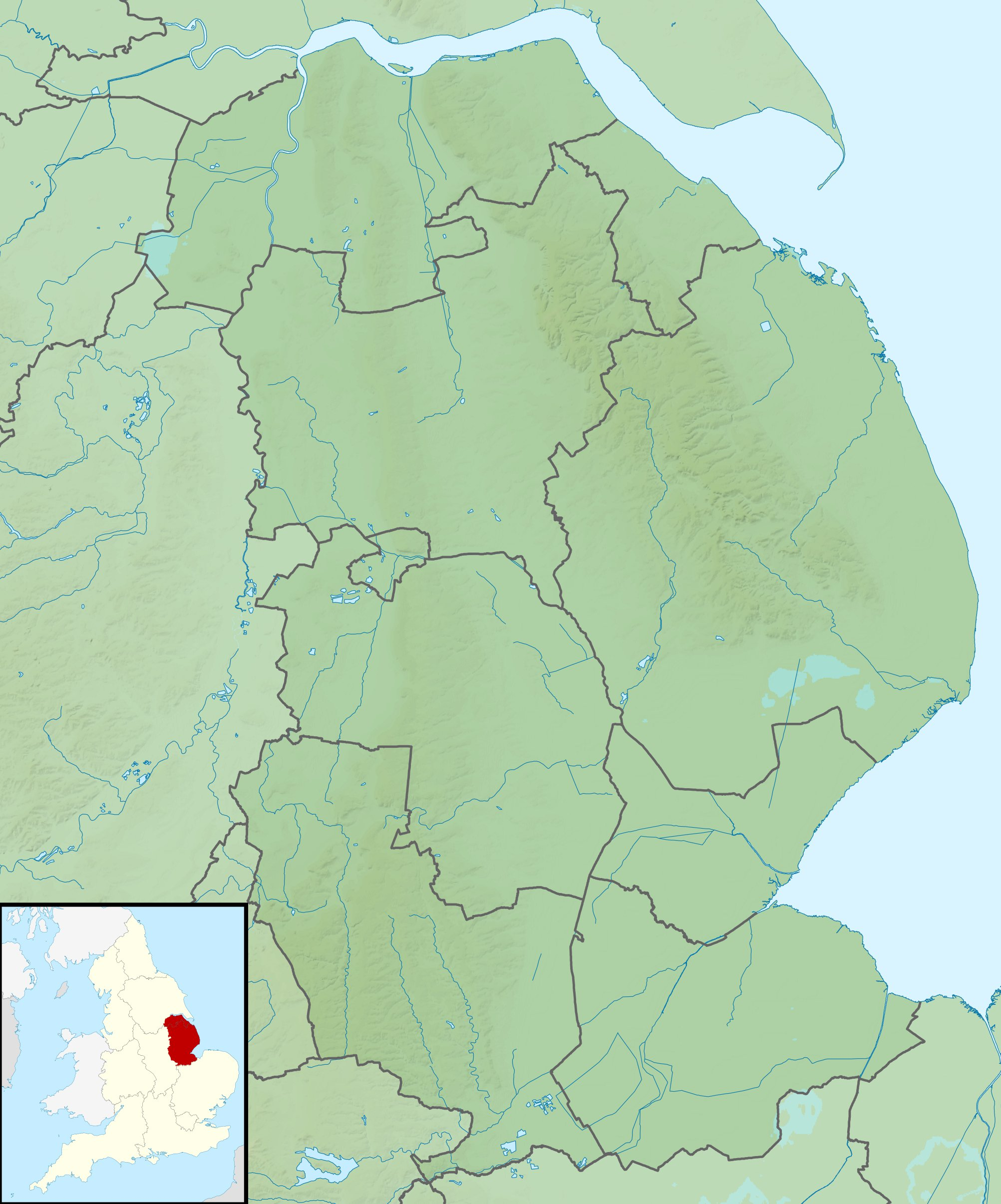
- Location within Lincolnshire
- Type: Local Nature Reserve
- Location: near Bourne and Spalding, south of the River Glen, England
- OS grid: TF 181 213
- Coordinates: 52.776379°N 0.25066380°W
- Area: 112.0 hectares (277 acres)
- Manager: Lincolnshire Wildlife Trust

Willow Tree Fen is a local nature reserve with an area of over 112.0 ha (277 acres) located near Bourne and Spalding, south of the River Glen, England. The site was acquired by Lincolnshire Wildlife Trust in 2009 and converted from an arable field into a wetland fen.

== Site history ==
The site was converted into a wetland in 2009. In 2011, an archaeological dig at the site resulted in the discovery of hundreds of historical artefacts, including pottery and tools, from when the reserve was used as a salt making site. The site was closed to the public in March 2020 as a result of the COVID-19 pandemic in England. A new viewing area was opened in March 2022.

== Wildlife ==
In July 2020 it was announced that a pair of common cranes had successfully bred at the site; the first time the bird has bred in Lincolnshire for over 400 years.

Eurasian bittern was filmed at the site for the first time in 2016.

Several bird species that have been noted include bluethroat, spoonbill, red footed falcon, garganey, cuckoo.mammals include brown hare roe deer, otter, water vole .winter is good for winter swans, wigeon and geese, goosanders.
