= Barrow Blow Wells =

Nature reserve in Lincolnshire, England

Barrow Blow wells
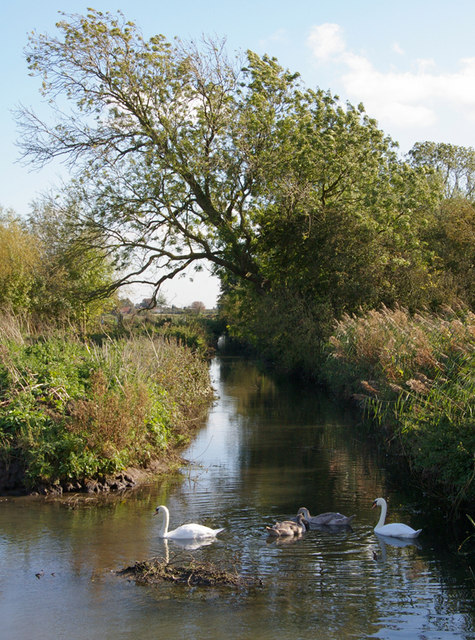

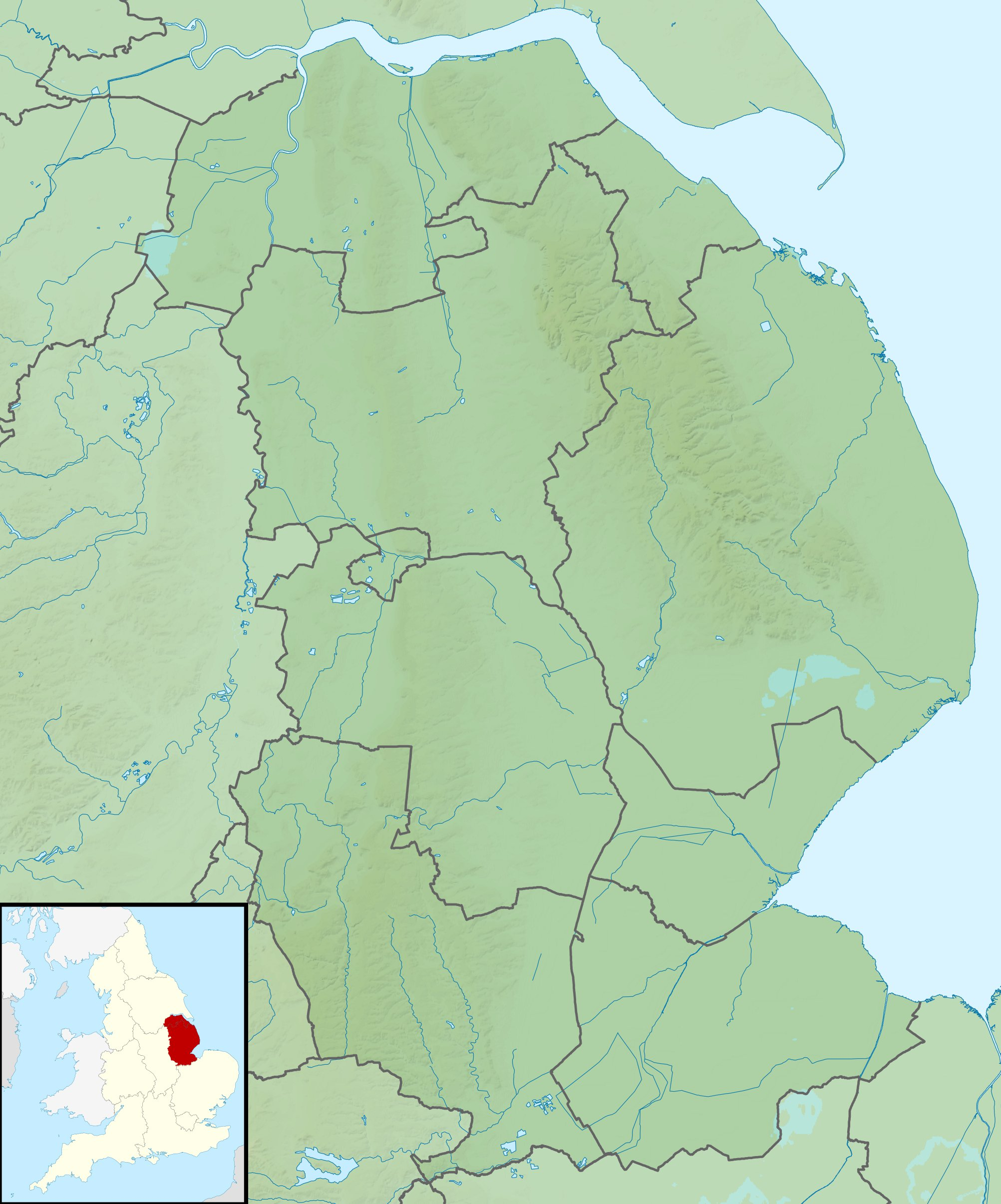
- Location within Lincolnshire
- Interactive map of Barrow Blow wells
- Type: Local Nature Reserve
- Location: Cherry Lane, Barrow-upon-Humber, North Lincolnshire, England
- OS grid: TA073221
- Coordinates: 53.684658°N 0.37797855°W
- Area: 2.7 hectares (6.7 acres)
- Manager: Lincolnshire Wildlife Trust

Barrow Blow Wells is a local nature reserve with an area of over 2.7 ha (6.7 acres) located in Barrow-upon-Humber, North Lincolnshire, England.

The site consists of reedmarshes and woodland centred around two blow wells (natural artesian springs). These blow wells are mainly only to be found on the coastal margins of Lincolnshire. Rainfall forms chalk streams beneath marshes, which get covered in clay when nearing the Humber estuary placing them under higher pressure. Where there is an opening in the clay from the chalk, as at Barrow blow wells, the water is forced upwards.
