= Tunman Wood =

Nature reserve in Lincolnshire, England

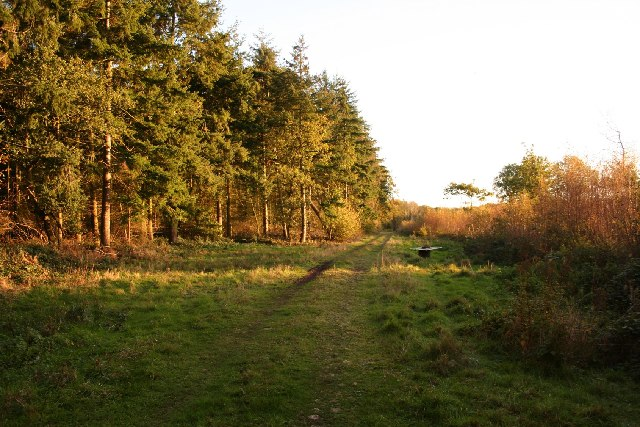

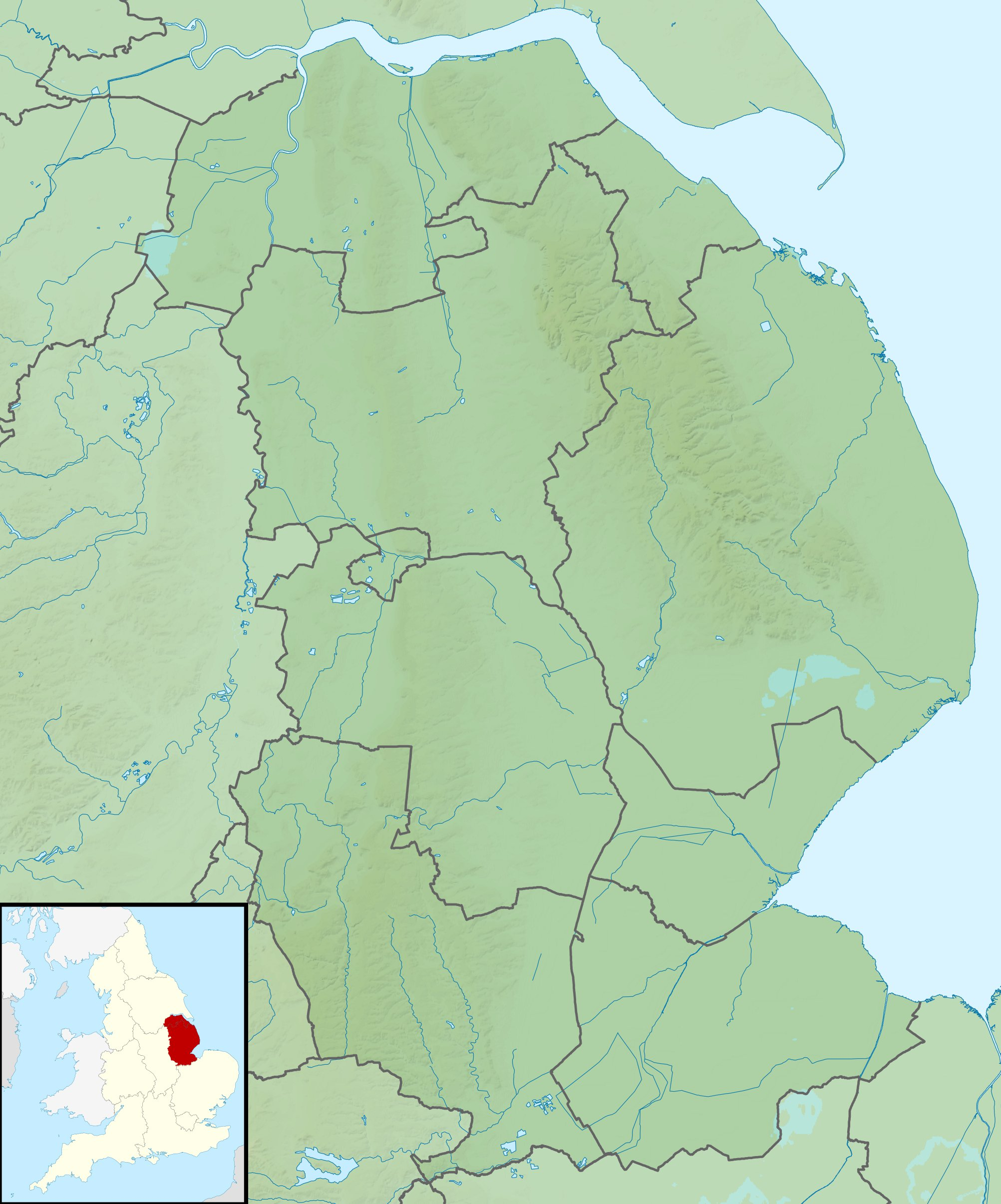
- Location within Lincolnshire
- Type: Local Nature Reserve
- Location: Morton Lane, Eagle Barnsdale, Lincolnshire, england, LN6 9EA
- OS grid: SK 889 655
- Coordinates: 53.179186°N 0.67126478°W
- Area: 53.0 hectares (131 acres)
- Manager: Lincolnshire Wildlife Trust

Tunman Wood is a local nature reserve with an area of over 53 ha (130 acres) located near Eagle Barnsdale, Lincolnshire. It is an area of ancient woodland and has existed since at least 1774. It was used by the Forestry Commission from the 1940s until it was purchased by Lincolnshire County Council, North Kesteven District Council and Lincolnshire Wildlife Trust from Lafarge Aggregates in February 2009.
