= Far Ings National Nature Reserve =

Nature reserve in Lincolnshire, England

Far Ings
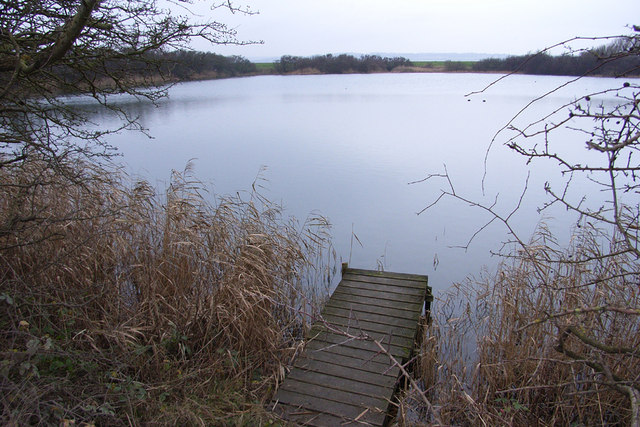

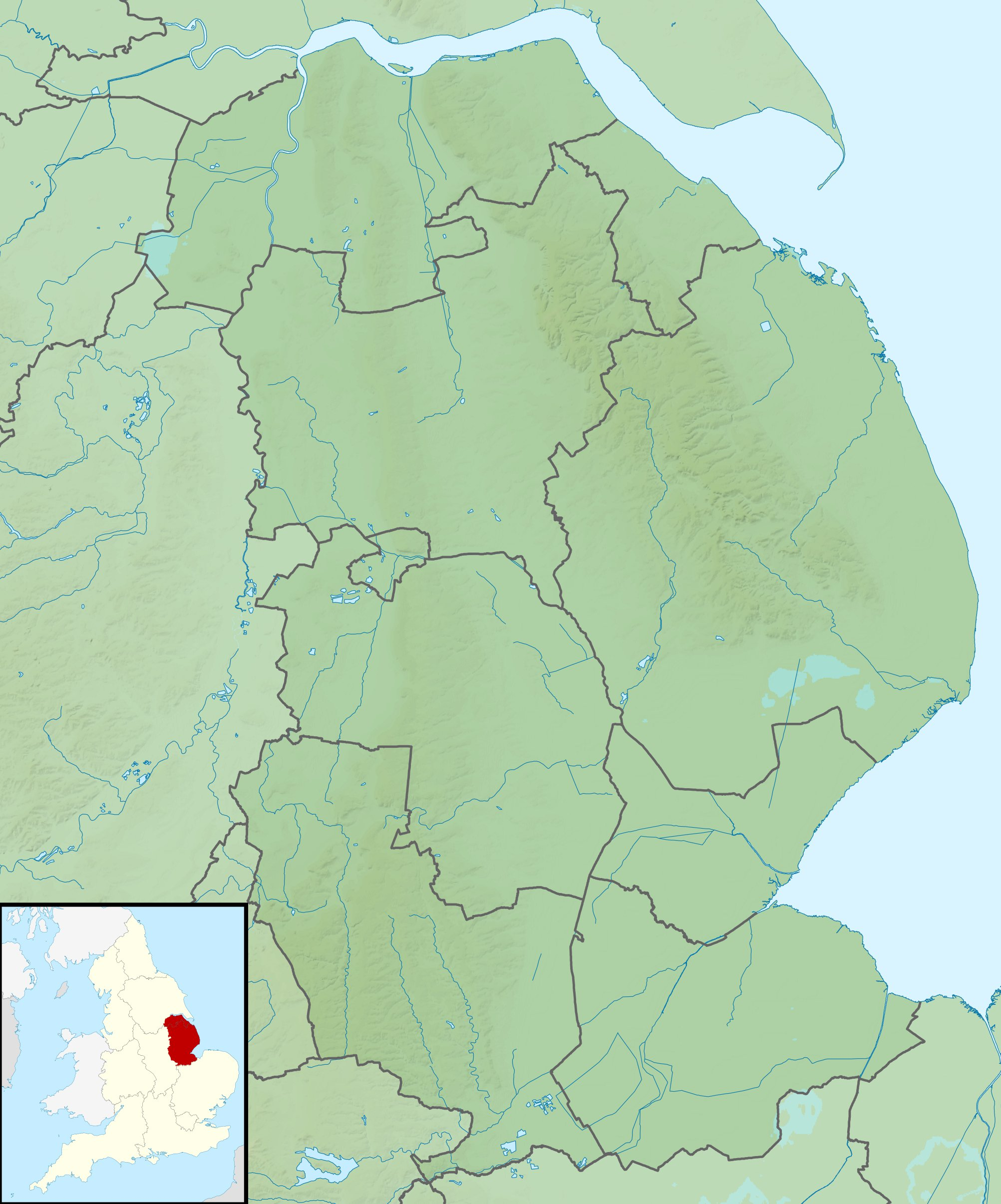
- Location within Lincolnshire
- OS grid: TA017233
- Coordinates: 53.696838°N 0.45998523°W
- Area: 59 hectares (150 acres)
- Manager: Lincolnshire Wildlife Trust

Ramsar Wetland
- Designated: 28 July 1994
- Reference no.: 663

Far Ings national nature reserve is an area of over 90 ha (220 acres) on the southern shore of the Humber Estuary in North Lincolnshire, England. It is immediately west of the town of Barton-upon-Humber and the village of Barton Waterside. In addition to being designated as a national nature reserve, it is within the Humber Estuary Ramsar site, Site of Special Scientific Interest, Special Area of Conservation, and Special Protection Area.

== History ==
The clay pits on the Humber foreshore were the focus of a tile and cement industry from 1850 to 1959. The industrial sites were abandoned in the early 20th century once supplies of clay began to run out. The clay workings filled with water and became colonised by species of reeds. The reserve was acquired by Lincolnshire Wildlife Trust in 1983, who opened it in the same year.

The site was designed as a national nature reserve in April 2005.

A tidal surge on 5 December 2013 caused by Cyclone Xaver breached the flood defences on the Humber bank, flooding the reserve. The visitor centre re-opened in August 2014.

The visitor centre, toilets, and car park were closed during the COVID-19 Pandemic in England.

In 2020, a proposal was launched to develop a series of holiday lodges on the site of the former Humber Bridge Hotel, located within the reserve. The Lincolnshire Wildlife Trust formally campaigned against the development, citing that it would cause unavoidable disturbance to species protected by law such as marsh harrier, bearded tit, Cetti's warbler, kingfisher, and barn owl. The planning application received more than 830 responses, almost all of which were negative, and was thus of one of the most-objected applications in North Lincolnshire's history.

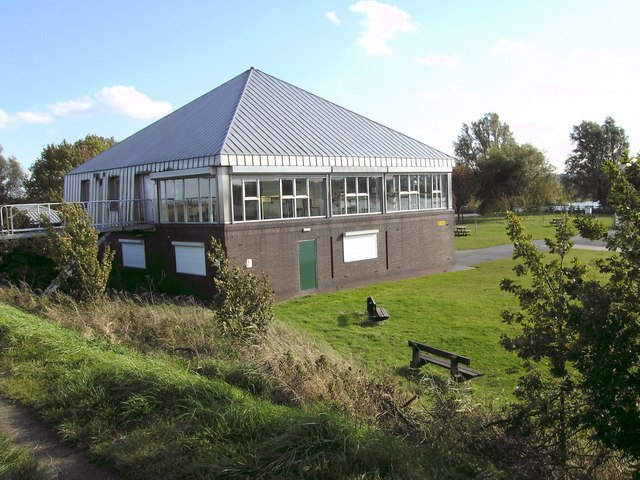
The visitor centre in 2008

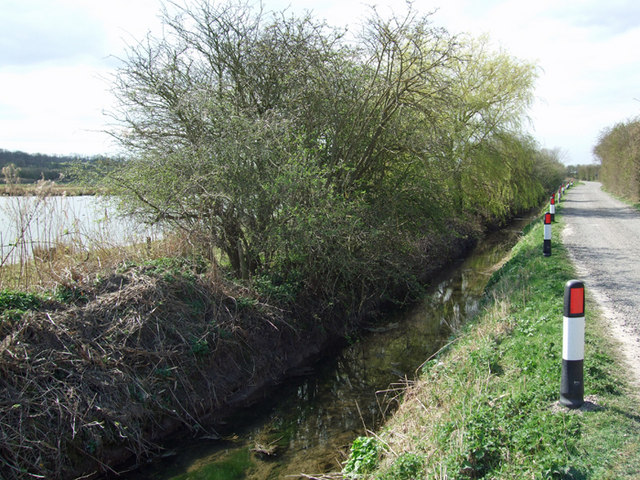
Far Ings road

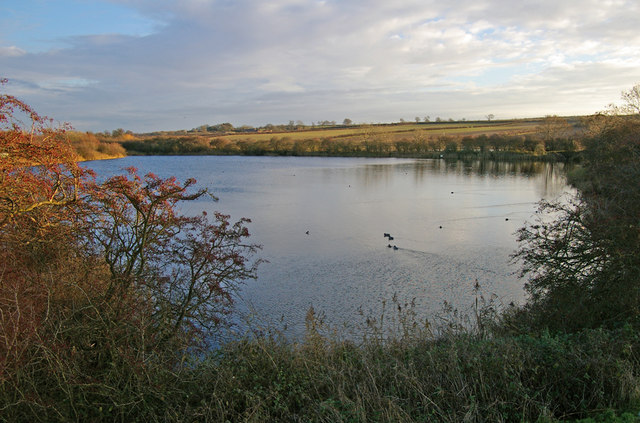

== Species ==
There are more than 250 species of moths, 230 species of wildflower, and at least 19 species of butterflies identified from Far Ings. The first Eurasian bitterns to breed in Lincolnshire in over 30 years were seen at Far Ings in 2000. A Blyth's reed warbler was spotted at the reserve in June 2020. A murmuration of several thousand starlings was filmed at the site by the BBC in January 2023.

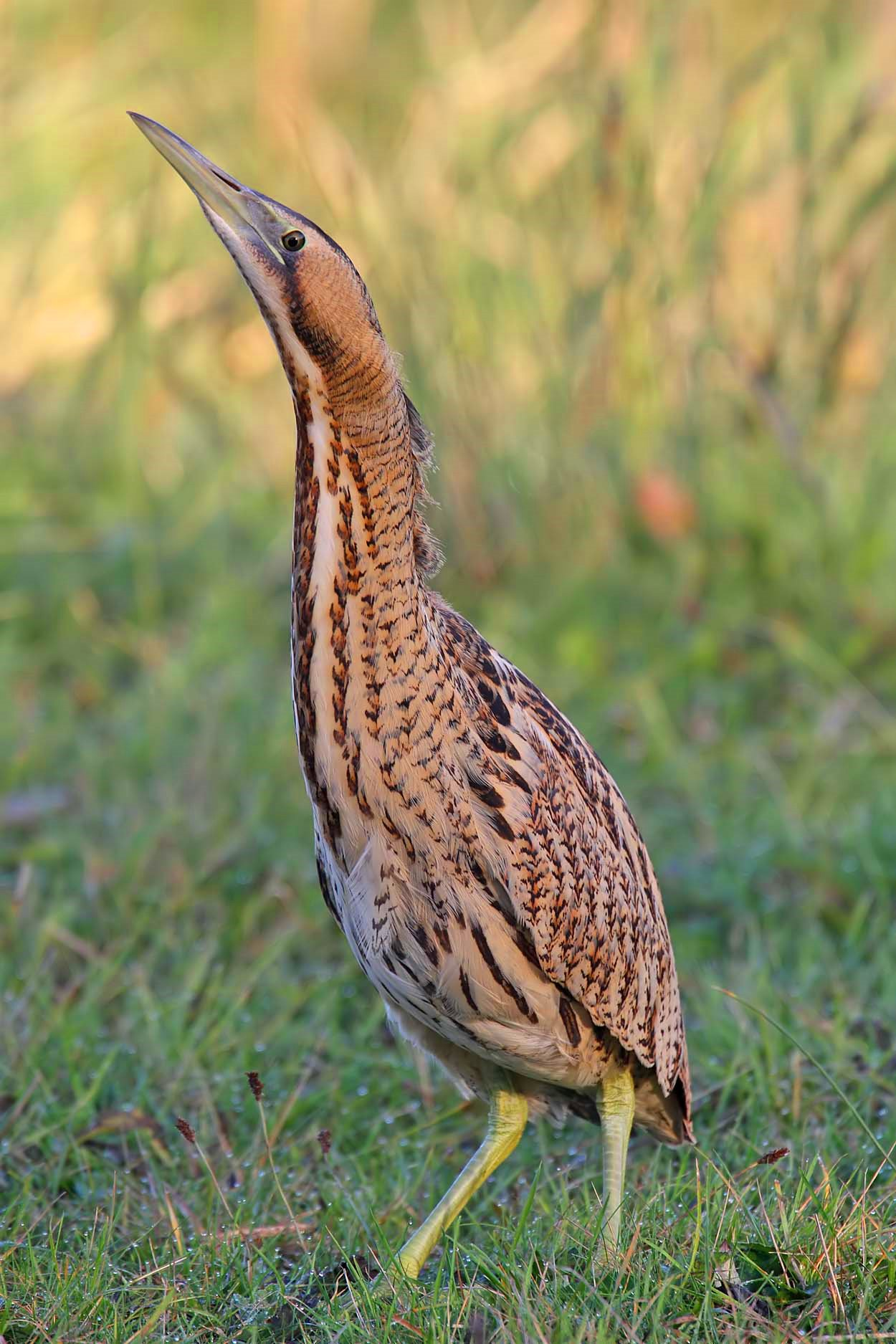
Eurasian Bittern at Far Ings, 2013

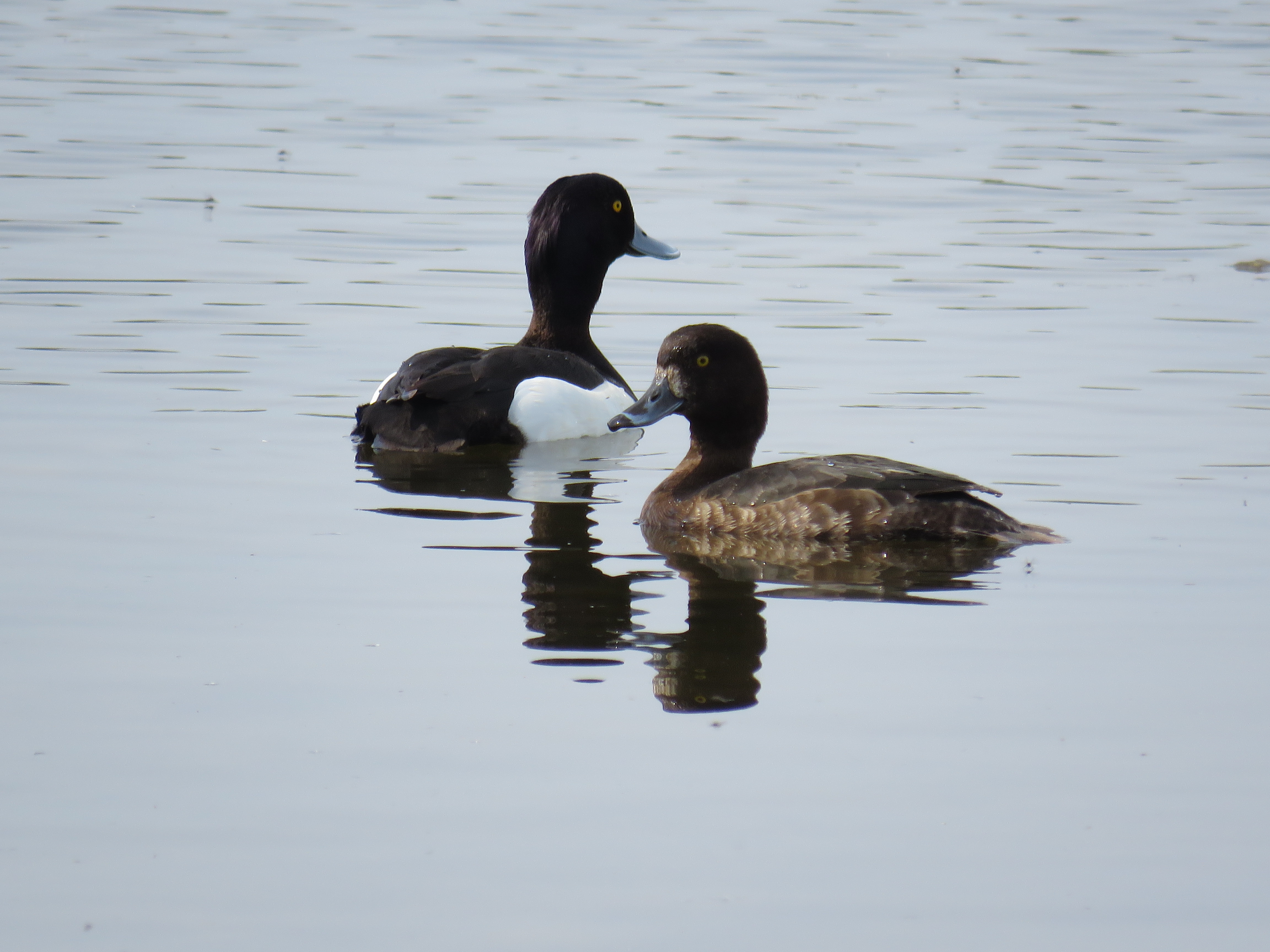
Tufted ducks

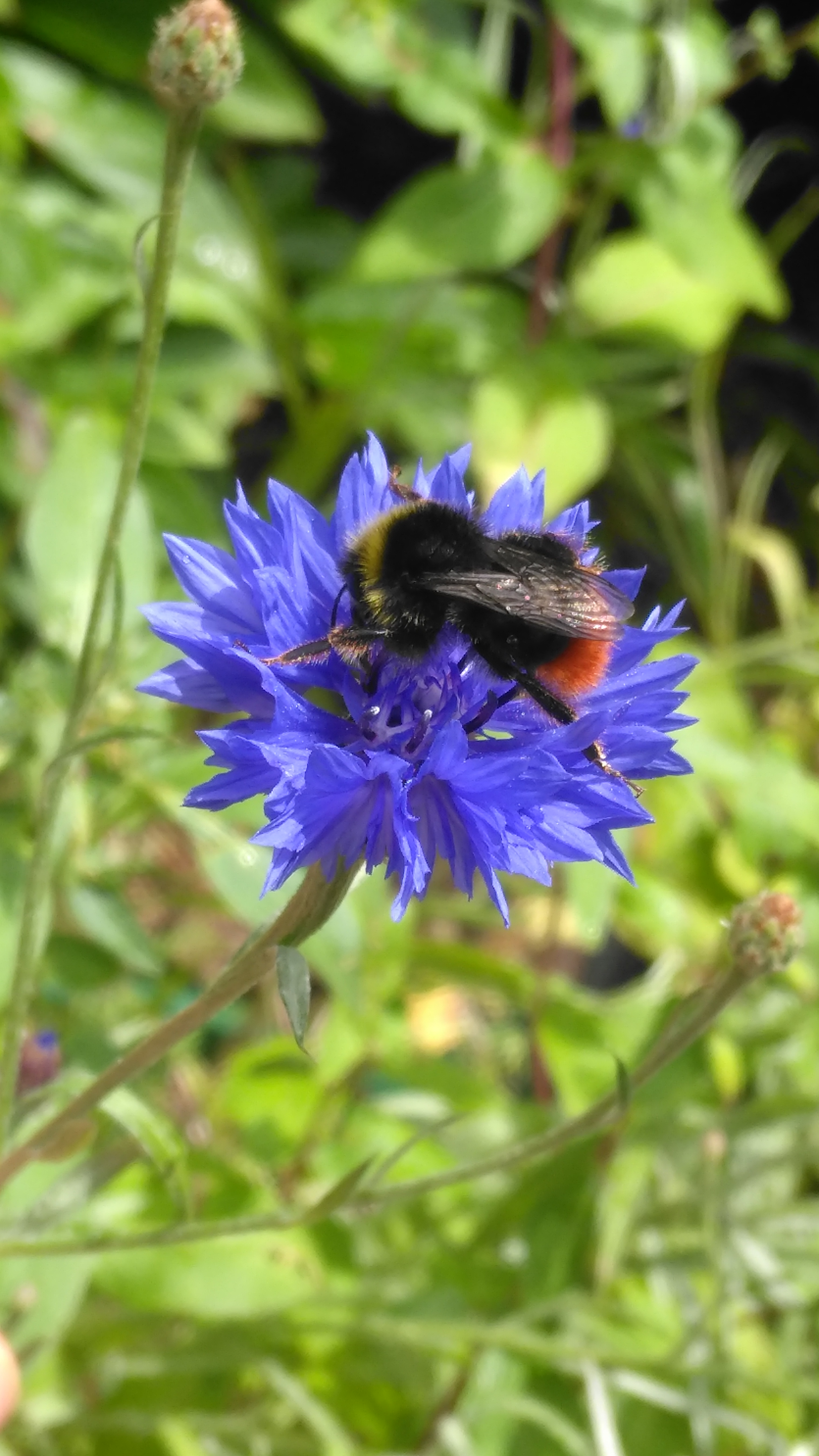
Bombus lapidarius

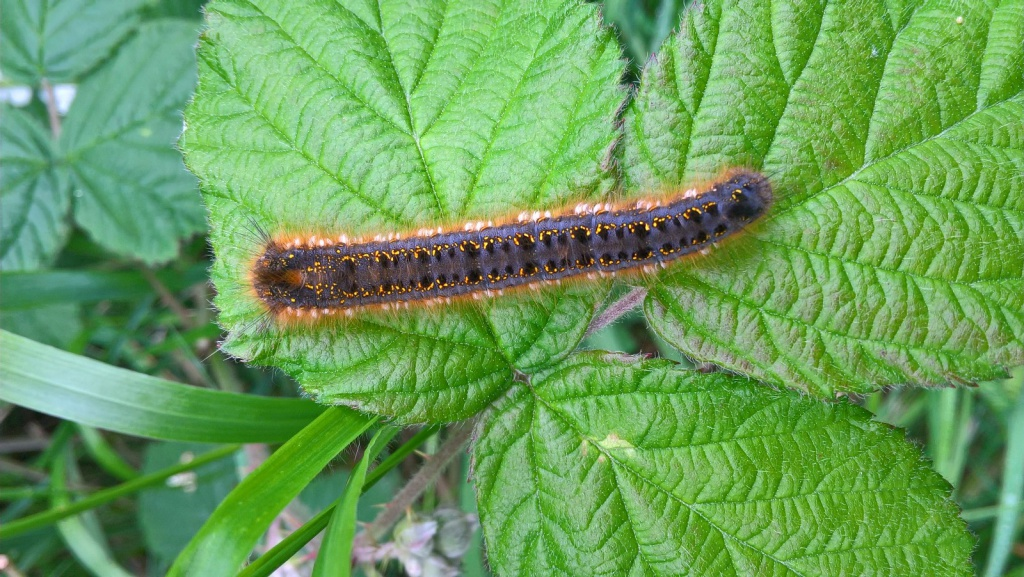
Drinker moth larva

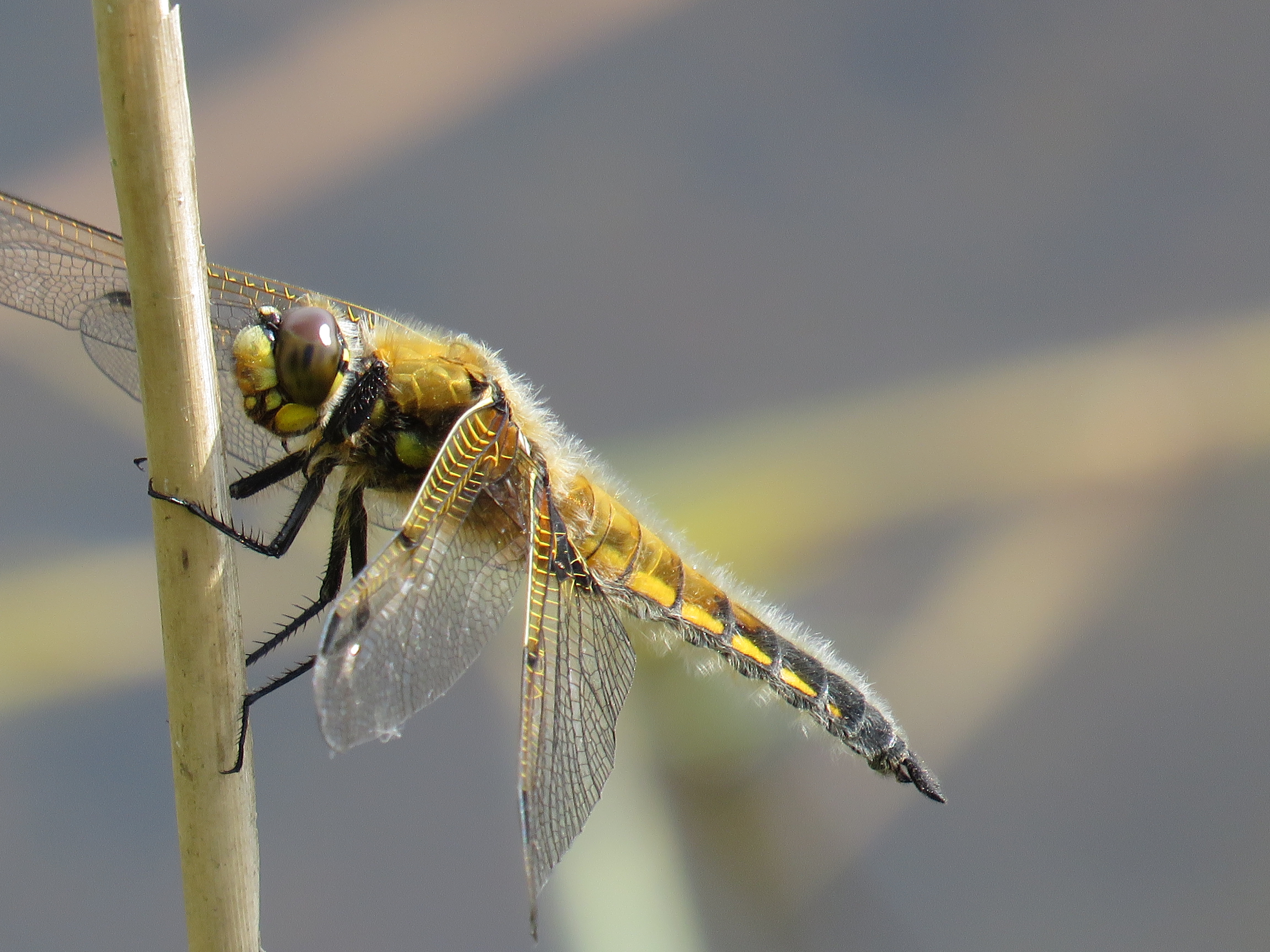
Dragonfly
