= Landseer Park =

Park in Ipswich, Suffolk, England

Coordinates: 52.039°N 1.172°E

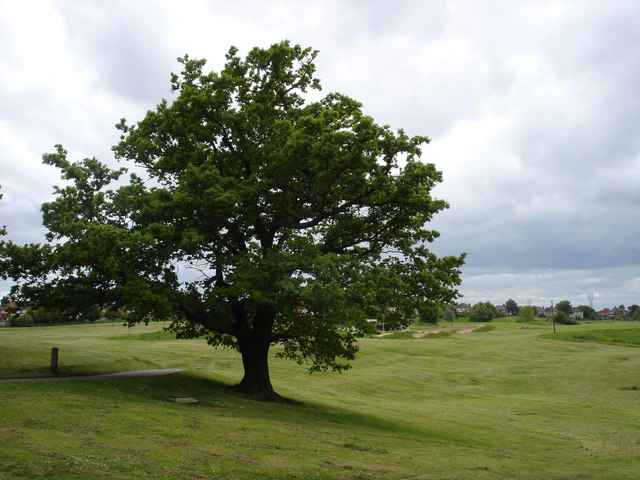

- Location within Suffolk
- District: Ipswich
- Shire county: Suffolk
- Region: East
- Country: England
- Sovereign state: United Kingdom
- Police: Suffolk
- Fire: Suffolk
- Ambulance: East of England

Landseer Park is a large open green space north of Landseer Road, in the eastern suburbs of Ipswich, Suffolk, England. It is home to the Ipswich BMX Club. National Cycle Route 51 passes through the park. It is designated a County Wildlife Site.

== History ==
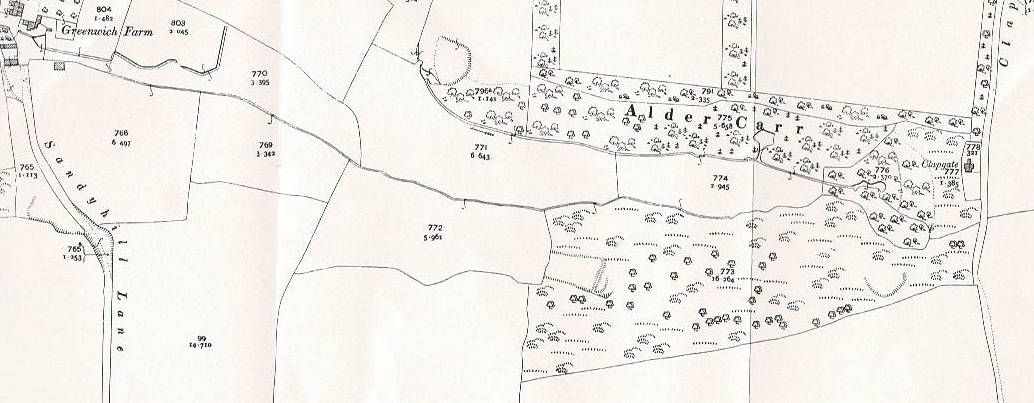
1902 Ordnance Survey showing the site of Landseer park

The area used to be wooded valley with a brook running down from east to west and into the River Orwell. The 1902 Ordnance Survey map shows an area known as Clapgate, which means a "gate on to a waste or common—which the animals going to the common can push open but which shuts automatically so that they cannot get out." There is also a wooded area marked as Alder Carr, a kind of land form also featured on the same map in the nearby Holywells Estate. This name is retained on the Ipswich Wildlife Audit 2013 map. The audit describes how up until the 1960s the site consisted of various mature trees set in woodland, alongside shrubland, and wetland features such as wet meadows, fen, streams and ponds.

However, during the 1950s and 1960s, except for the playground area at the eastern end of the park, the site was used as a landfill site to dispose of domestic waste. Thousands of tonnes of household waste and possibly some industrial waste and even a dead horse were dumped there. Nevertheless, the area was used by local children from the Gainsborough Estate as a play area, and the existence of the now buried rubbish is still indicated by the presence of tall cast iron methane vents

== Geology ==
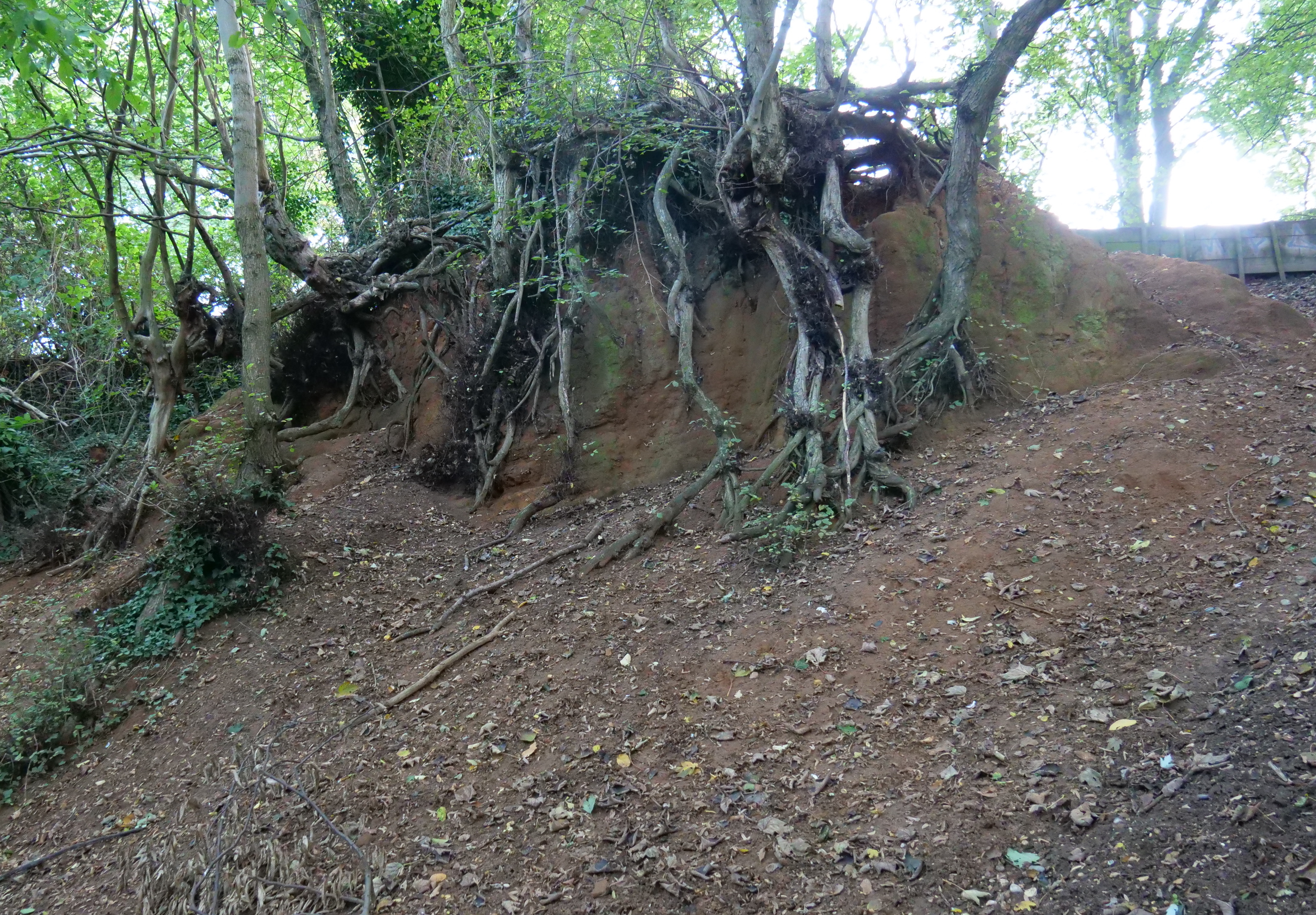
Red Crag in Landseer Park

Part of the area has a 2-metre layer of Red Crag, i.e. fossilised seashells coloured red by iron, sitting on top of London Clay.

== Ipswich BMX Club ==
The Ipswich BMX Club built the first BMX track in the UK here in 1980.The club continues to provide coaching and races in the park on a regular basis. In 2013 they applied to Ipswich Borough Council for funds to upgrade the track surface so that they could continue to hold practice sessions and meet the necessary standards for national and international BMX meets.

== Gallery ==
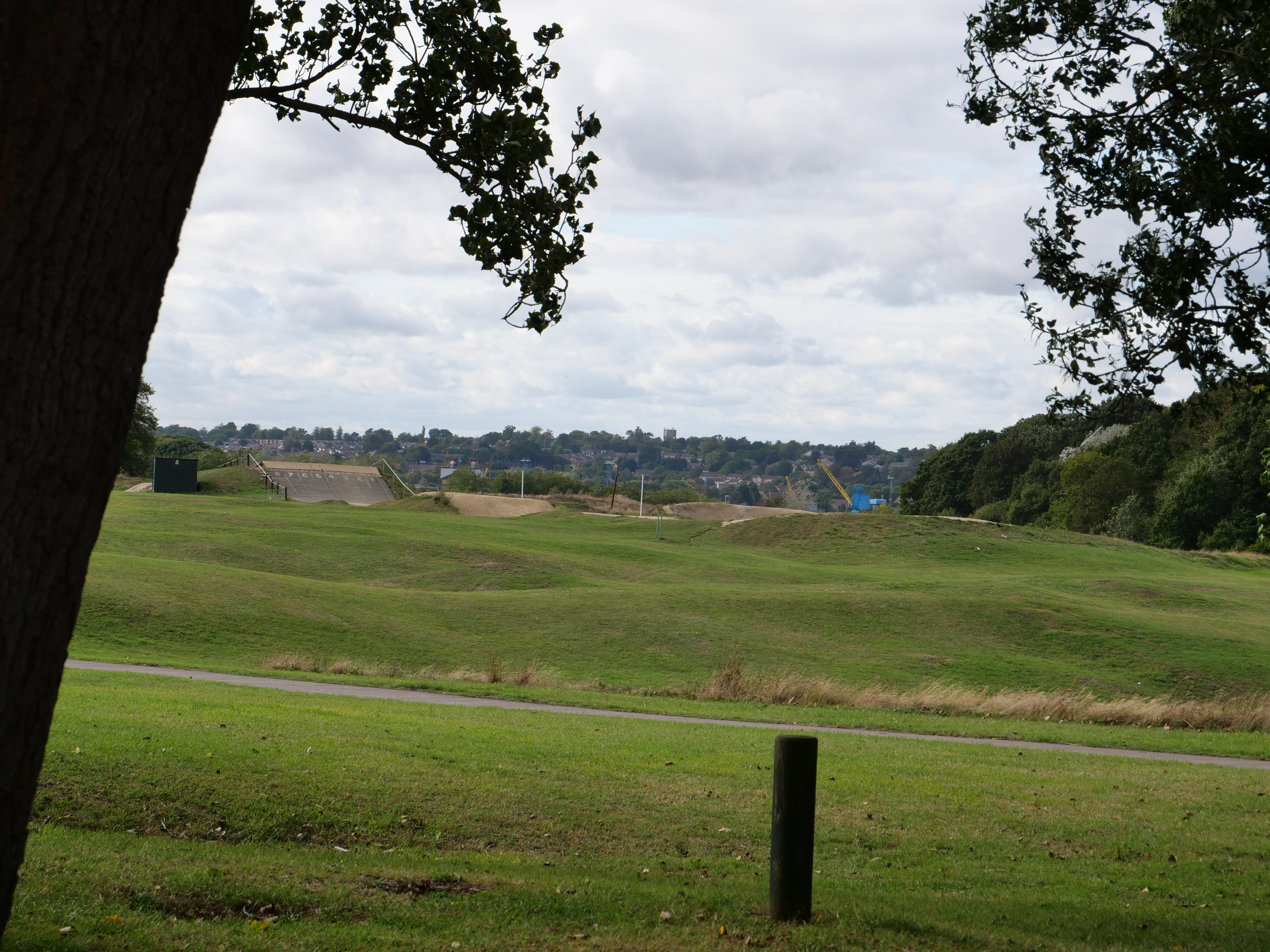
A long-distance view of the Landseer Park BMX track

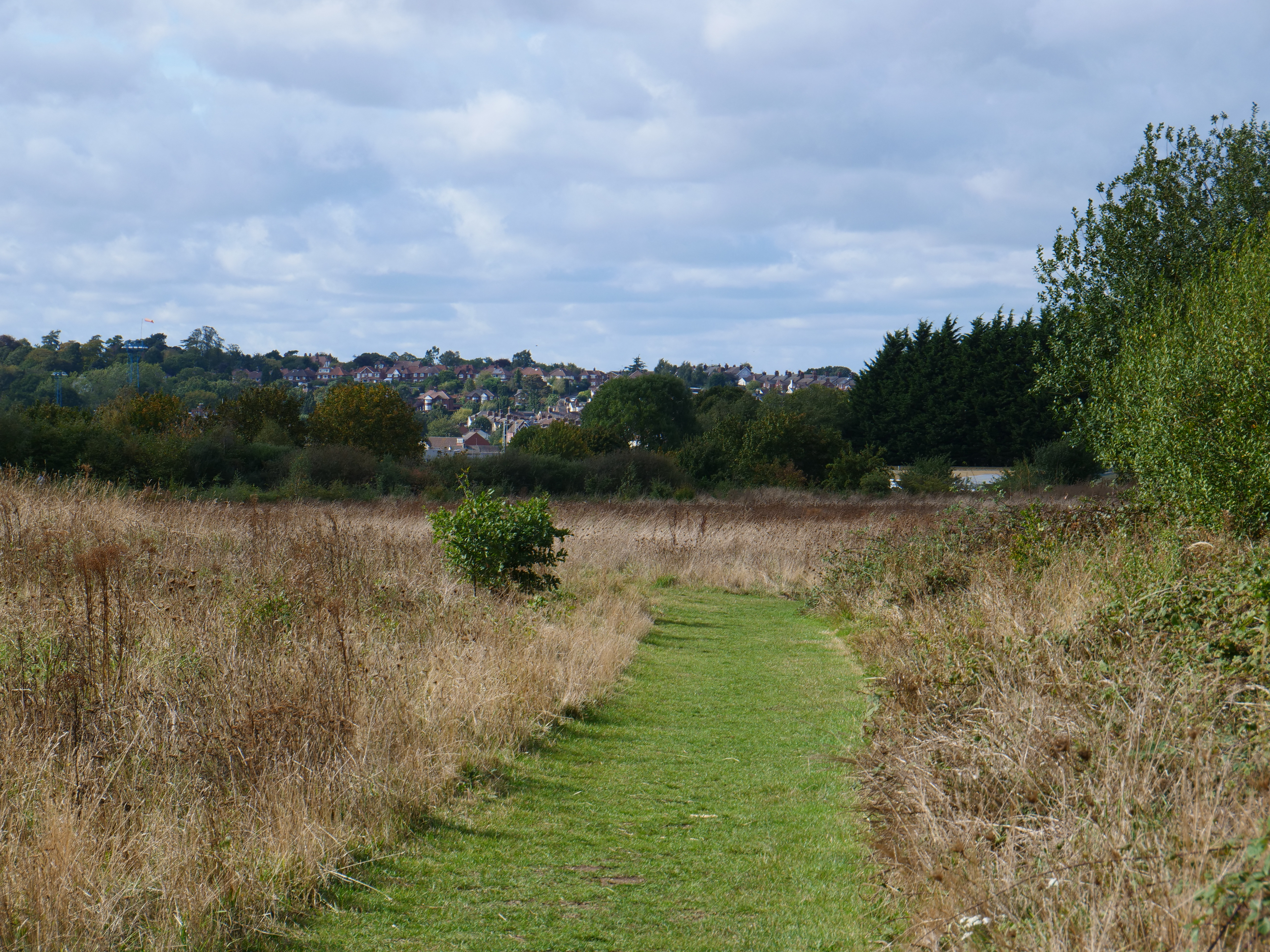
Landseer Park - view of Maidenhall in the distance

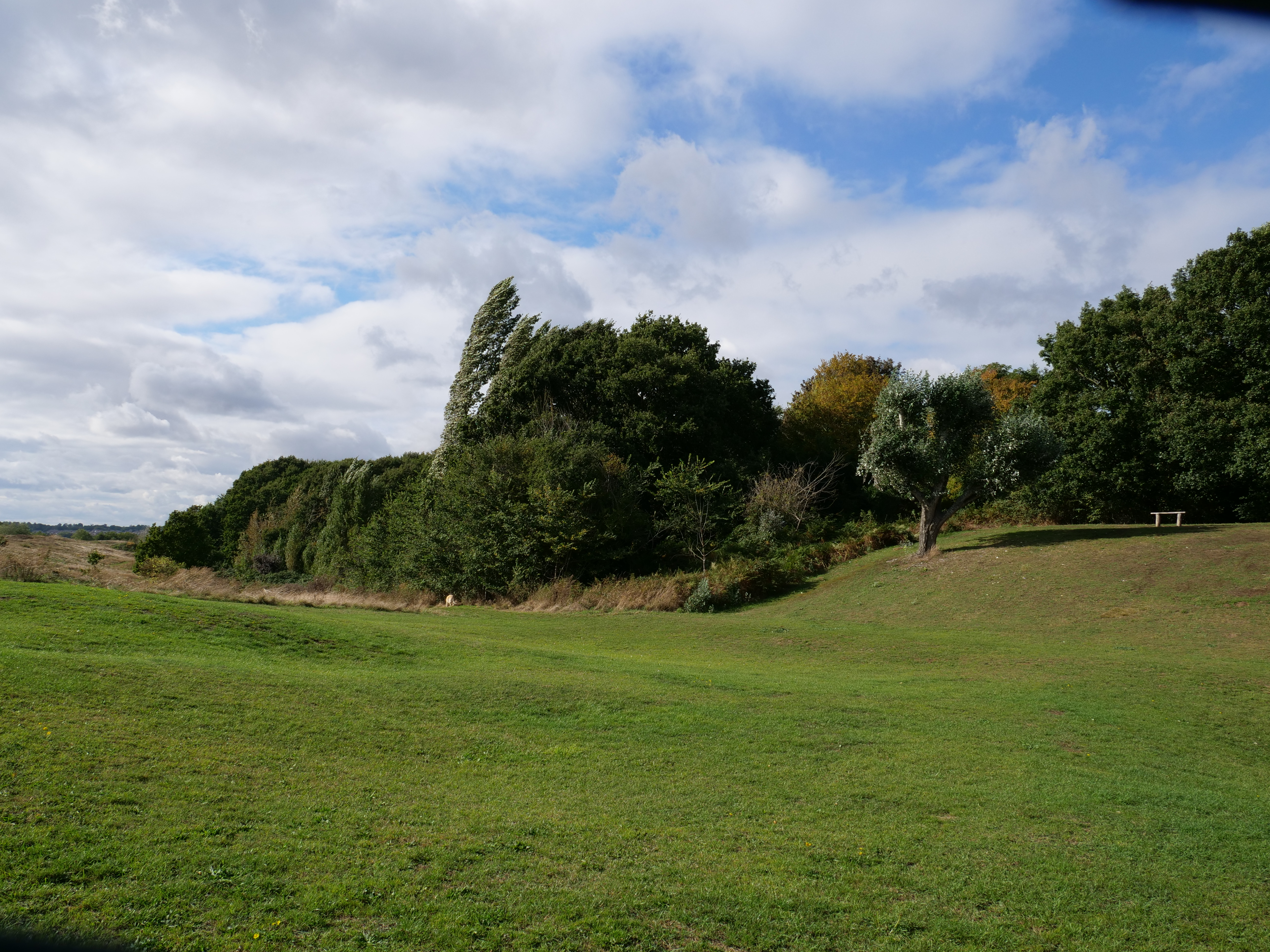
Landseer Park - view west from the eastern end of park

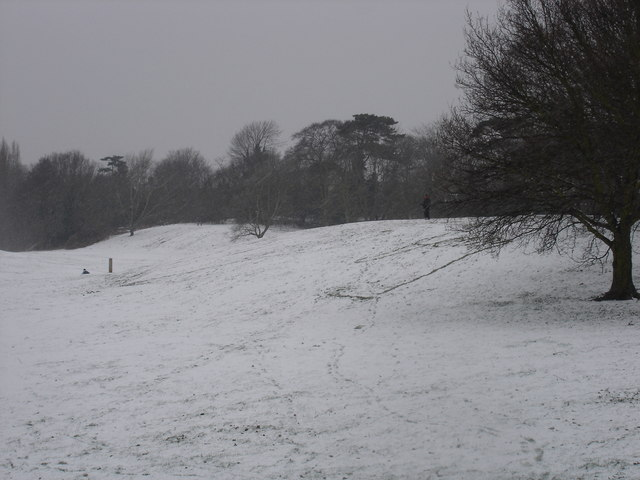
Landseer Park with snow, February 2009
