= Havenside =

Nature reserve in Lincolnshire, England

- Interactive map of Havenside
- Type: Local Nature Reserve
- Location: Fishtoft, Lincolnshire
- OS grid: TF 351 413
- Area: 18.91 hectares (46.7 acres)

Havenside is an 18.91-hectare Local Nature Reserve in Fishtoft, a civil parish in the Boston borough of Lincolnshire. It is a thin piece of land along the eastern edge of The Haven (a stretch of the River Witham), running southwards from the built-up area around Skirbeck (within Fishtoft's parish boundaries but separate from the village of Fishtoft) to a point just north of the junction where Hobhole Drain merges with The Haven; the reserve is mostly bounded to the east by fields, but is backed onto by residential and industrial buildings at Skirbeck and is adjacent to a sewerage works further south. It contains a mixture of rough grassland with scrub and brambles, cattle-grazed meadows, seasonal ponds, estuary, and mud flats. It also contains the Pilgrim Fathers' Memorial on the site (formerly called Scotia Creek) where a group of puritans were arrested in 1607 while trying to escape religious persecution. The reserve's main entrance is near Finn Forest's works on the industrial estate off Fishtoft Road, Skirbeck. Another car park is off Scalp Road in Fishtoft village.
