= Deeping Lakes Nature Reserve =

Nature reserve in Lincolnshire, England

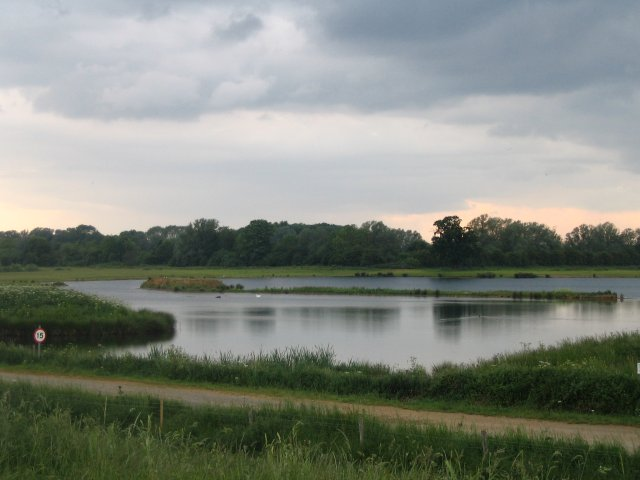

- Location within Lincolnshire
- Type: Local Nature Reserve
- Location: Deeping St James, Lincolnshire, England
- OS grid: TF187083
- Coordinates: 52.656675°N 0.25064869°W
- Area: 160 acres (65 ha)
- Manager: Lincolnshire Wildlife Trust

Deeping Lakes Nature Reserve, also known as Deeping Gravel Pits, is a local nature reserve with an area of over 160 acres located south-east of Deeping St James in Lincolnshire, England. It includes part of the Deeping Gravel Pits SSSI and is placed within a Higher Level Stewardship scheme.

== Site ==
The site comprises a series of flooded former gravel pits to create a wetland habitat.

== History ==
The largest lake was excavated in the 19th century and since developed naturally. The two smaller lakes date from the 1990s. The main lake was purchased by Lincolnshire Wildlife Trust in 2003. They manage the whole site, although the smaller lakes are on long lease.

In 1848 the site was used as a brickworks. Gravel extraction started in 1870. The large lake and one formerly known as 'the Mere' were quarried to provide stone for the Great Northern Railway. The Mere was originally transformed by its owner, Richard Thompson, who planted trees and added fish stocks to the lake, which became a tourist attraction. The Lake and The Mere were designated as a SSSI (Site of Special Scientific Interest) in 1968.

=== Lincolnshire Wildlife Trust ===
The large lake was purchased by Lincolnshire Wildlife Trust in 2003. In 2015, one of the lakes was redeveloped to level it off and break up three old islands; these were elevated out of the lake to create 27 smaller islands.

On 30 April 2019 oil drums were dumped in the River Welland, affecting wildfowl at the reserve. LWT worked with the Environment Agency and RSPCA to remove the oil and clean the 25 mute swans affected by it. The site was also subjected to illegal dumping in September 2019.

The site and car park remained open to the public during the COVID-19 Pandemic in England.

== Wildlife ==
The site is known for its wildfowl and waterbirds as well as rare plants like Dactylorhiza incarnata (early marsh-orchid).

In the 1950s the site was used by the Wildfowl & Wetlands Trust to create a bird ringing trap in the Mere. Between 1964 and 1984, 11,574 ducks were ringed on the island. A common pochard ringed on the site in February 1966 was shot in Russia in September 1968. In 1990, 103 heron nests were counted, though the annual decline of these nests (down to 24 in 2009) has been attributed to the increased breeding of cormorants here.

By 2016 otters had become regularly reported from the site.
