= Snipe Dales =

Nature reserve in Lincolnshire, England

- Plaque where the Prime Meridian intersects Snipe Dales

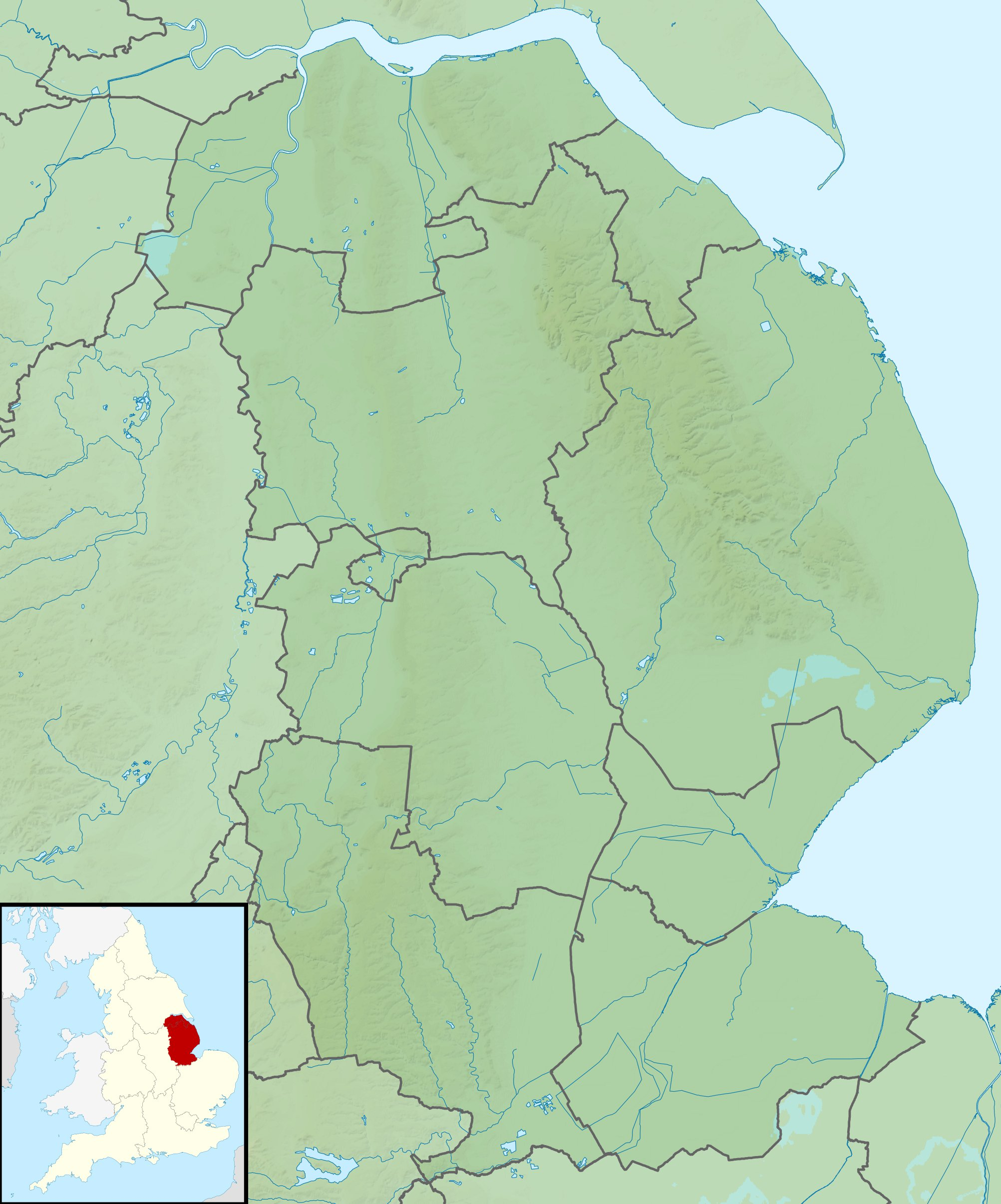
- Location within Lincolnshire
- Coordinates: 53.196°N 0.005°W
- Area: 87 hectares (210 acres)
- Manager: Lincolnshire Wildlife Trust and Lincolnshire County Council

Snipe Dales is a country park and nature reserve in the Lincolnshire Wolds near Hagworthingham in Lincolnshire, England. The reserve is one of the few remaining examples showing the Wolds as they were.

Snipe Dales comprises a raised heathland nature reserve at the west and a semi-natural mostly coniferous woodland country park at the east. It is located within a steep sided valley containing many small streams, sourced from springs, flowing into a larger stream that becomes a tributary of the River Lymn.

The country park is 210 acres (0.8 km^{2}) in total of which 90 is woodland previously owned by the Forestry Commission and now by Lincolnshire County Council. The nature reserve and park is jointly managed by the County Council and Lincolnshire Wildlife Trust with help from volunteers. Access is by foot or wheelchair only, although there is a car park with visitor facilities. Dogs are allowed on a short lead in the country park but not in the reserve.

The Prime Meridian runs through Snipe Dales and a plaque is at its intersection.
