= Clapgate Pits =

Disused quarry in Lincolnshire, England

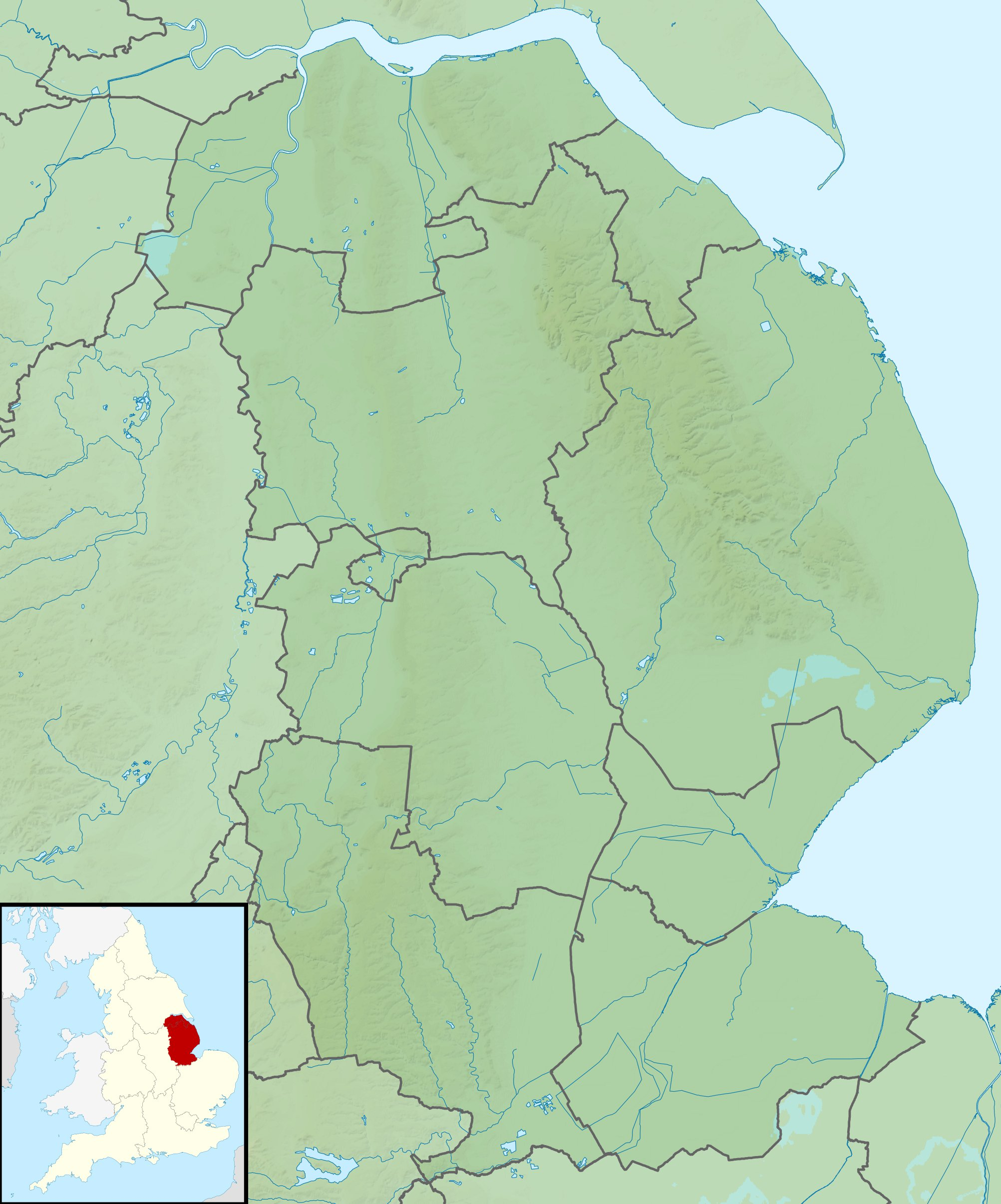
- Location within Lincolnshire
- Interactive map of Clapgate Pits
- Type: Local Nature Reserve
- Location: North-east corner of Broughton Woods, Broughton, North Lincolnshire, England
- OS grid: SE961109
- Coordinates: 53.585889°N 0.54977266°W
- Area: 1.0 hectare (2.5 acres)
- Manager: Lincolnshire Wildlife Trust

Clapgate Pits is a disused quarry near Broughton, Lincolnshire. This 1.0 ha (2.5 acres) site has been managed by Lincolnshire Wildlife Trust since 1996. It provides an environment for several plants which are rare in Lincolnshire: pale St John's-Wort, Squinancywort and Wall Germander. Until 1969 it was the most northerly site in Britain for Pasqueflower but these plants were apparently dug up by vandals.

== Mammals ==
The following mammals have been recorded in Clapgate Pits:

- Brown hare (Lepus europaeus)
- Grey squirrel (Sciurus carolinensis)
- Reeves's muntjac (Muntiacus reevesi)
- Roe deer (Capreolus capreolus)
