= Brumby Wood =

Nature reserve in Scunthorpe, England

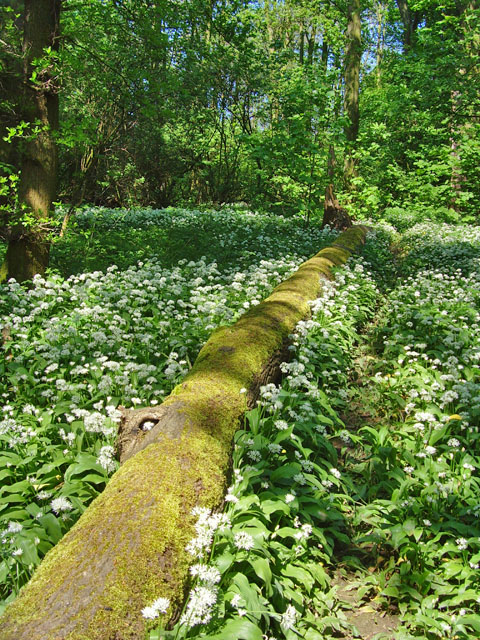
- Brumby Wood
- Interactive map of Brumby Wood
- Type: Local Nature Reserve
- Location: Scunthorpe, North Lincolnshire
- OS grid: SE 880 103
- Area: 21.84 hectares (54.0 acres)
- Manager: North Lincolnshire Council

Brumby Wood is a 21.84-hectare Local Nature Reserve in the town of Scunthorpe in North Lincolnshire. It is owned and managed by North Lincolnshire Council. It is composed of ancient woodland which provides a good habitat for birds, mammals, invertebrates, bluebell, wild garlic and yellow archangel; the site is located in Scunthorpe and is bounded to the north by the South Humberside Main Line railway, to the east and west by playing fields and to the south by an industrial site, a crematorium and a cemetery; the wood is bisected by the A18 road.
