= Stanton's Pit =

Nature reserve in Lincolnshire, England

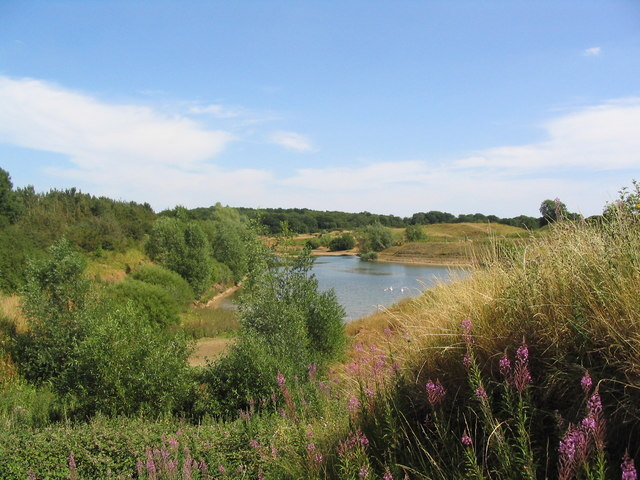
- Stanton's Pit
- Interactive map of Stanton's Pit
- Type: Local Nature Reserve
- Location: Between Little Bytham and Witham-on-the-Hill, Lincolnshire
- OS grid: TF 035 171
- Area: 8.05 hectares (19.9 acres)
- Manager: Lincolnshire Wildlife Trust

Stanton's Pit is an 8.05-hectare Local Nature Reserve situated between Little Bytham and Witham-on-the-Hill, villages in the South Kesteven district of Lincolnshire. It is owned and managed by Lincolnshire Wildlife Trust.

The reserve mostly comprises a disused sand pit with adjacent grasslands which was donated by its former owner to the Lincolnshire Wildlife Trust so that it could be classified as a Local Nature Reserve. It has been designated as such on the basis of its ornithological interest, with 50 species of birds recorded visiting the site and 19 breeding, including little grebe, little ringed plover, sand martin, turtle dove and lesser whitethroat. Wading birds known to occupy the site in autumn include little stint, ruff and spotted redshank, greenshank, and common, curlew, green and wood sandpipers. Stanton's Pit is suspected to be situated on a migratory route from The Wash to Rutland Water. The site is bounded to the north by a minor road between Little Bytham and Witham-on-the-Hill, to the south and west by farmland and to the east by Bush Lees wood.
