= Atkinsons Warren =

Nature reserve in Lincolnshire, England

Coordinates: 53.6081°N 0.671°W

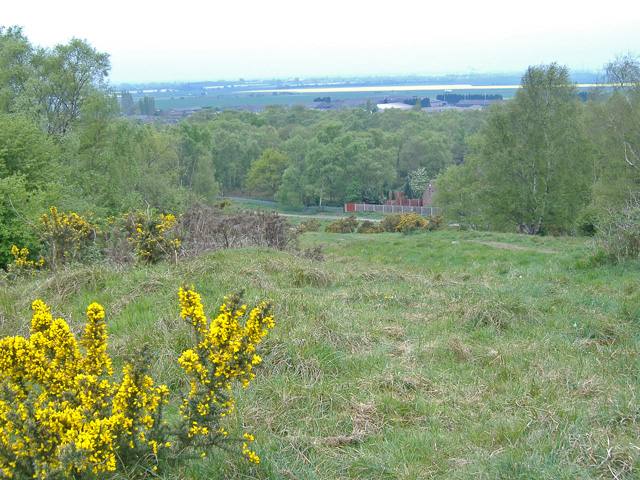
Atkinsons Warren

Atkinsons Warren is a large area of woodland in northwest Scunthorpe, North Lincolnshire, England. It is a Local Nature Reserve, and includes a meadow grazed by rabbits, rough grassland, developing scrub, and birch and oak woodland. It also features tree carvings. The Warren can be publicly accessed on foot or by car, and is used for walking dogs and riding bicycles.

The name comes from Walter Atkinson, gamekeeper for the Sheffield family of Normanby Hall. Atkinson lived in the south shooting lodge of the Warren from 1905 to 1966. The ruins of Atkinson's home remain in the reserve to this day on a popular path for dogwalkers.

Over 33 Hectares of the Warren was declared a nature reserve on 28 July 2004, though a small error in draughting led to 0.08 Hectares being removed in 2008.
