= Belshaw =

- Site of Special Scientific Interest
- Location within Lincolnshire
- Location of Belshaw.
- Area of search: Humberside
- Grid reference: SE768059
- Coordinates: 53.544575°N 0.841712°W
- Interest: Biological
- Area: 0.2 acres (0.00081 km^{2}; 0.00031 sq mi)
- Notification date: 1988

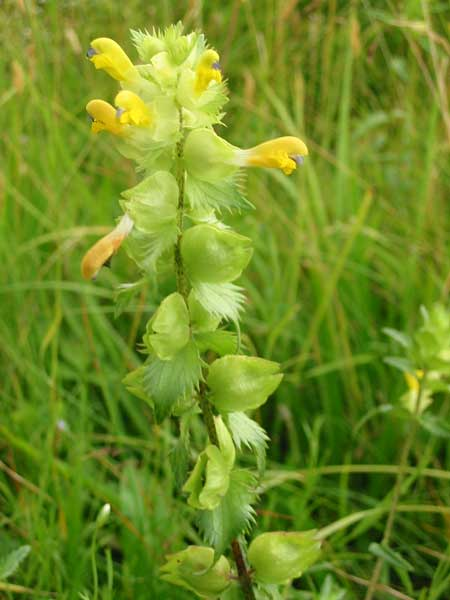
Rhinanthus angustifolius, the greater yellow-rattle

Belshaw is a Site of Special Scientific Interest (SSSI) in Lincolnshire, England. It lies to the west of the village of Belton in the Isle of Axholme. The site, which was designated a SSSI in 1988, is a short length of land along a disused railway line and is important because it supports a colony of greater yellow-rattle. This is a nationally rare plant which receives special protection under Schedule 8 of the Wildlife and Countryside Act, 1981. Once widely distributed, this species is now known to occur at only six localities in Great Britain.
