= Mareham Pastures =

Nature reserve in Sleaford, England

- Interactive map of Mareham Pastures
- Type: Local Nature Reserve
- Location: Sleaford, Lincolnshire
- OS grid: TF 071 447
- Area: 11 hectares (27 acres)
- Manager: Lincolnshire County Council and Friends of Mareham Pastures

Mareham Pastures is an 11-hectare Local Nature Reserve in Sleaford, a market town and civil parish in the North Kesteven district of Lincolnshire. It is owned by Lincolnshire County Council and managed jointly by Lincolnshire County Council and the Friends of Mareham Pastures. The reserve consists of wildflower meadows, new woodland, hedges and open grassland, providing a good habitat for butterflies and potentially barn owls; it is located westwards off Mareham Lane and is bounded to the north and north-west by residential developments at Quarrington and by farmland to the south; it is adjacent to a disused recycling centre (Sleaford Household Waste Recycling Centre), situated to its east. The site can be accessed by the public on foot via Bullock Pastures Lane, which begins at Sleaford Cricket Ground off London Road; visitors travelling by car can park next to the former recycling centre off Mareham Lane and gain access that way.
