= Heath's Meadows =

Nature reserve in Lincolnshire, England

- Location within Lincolnshire
- Type: Local Nature Reserve
- Location: Burgh le Marsh, Lincolnshire, England
- OS grid: TF484640
- Coordinates: 53.152465°N 0.21774223°W
- Area: 5.5 hectares (14 acres)
- Manager: Lincolnshire Wildlife Trust

Heath's Meadows is a local nature reserve with an area of over 5.5 ha (14 acres) located in Burgh le Marsh, Lincolnshire, England. It was acquired by Lincolnshire Wildlife Trust in 1969. The site was originally called Bratoft Meadows but was renamed in honour of Winifred Heath, a LWT fundraiser. The grassland meadows contain many flowers, including: cowslips, green-winged orchid, spotted orchid, adder's tongue, and dyer's greenweed.
