= Ryhall Pasture and Little Warren Verges =

Protected area in Lincolnshire and Rutland, England

Coordinates: 52.711°N 0.49°W

- Site of Special Scientific Interest
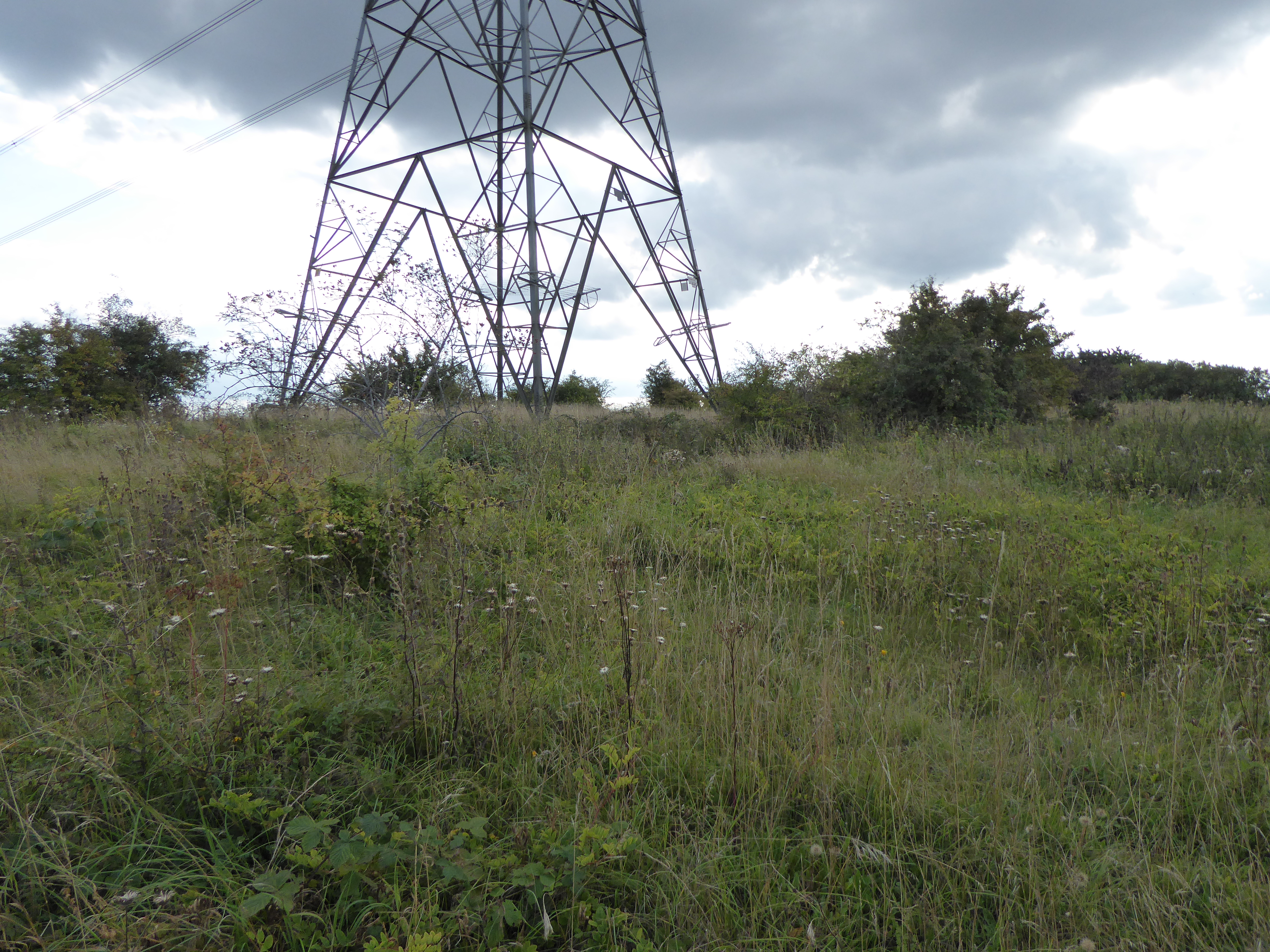
- Ryhall Pasture
- Location of Ryhall Pasture and Little Warren Verges.
- Area of search: Lincolnshire; Rutland
- Grid reference: TF 021 137
- Interest: Biological
- Area: 6.2 hectares
- Notification date: 1983
- Location map: Magic Map

Ryhall Pasture and Little Warren Verges is a 6.2-hectare (15-acre) biological Site of Special Scientific Interest north of the village of Ryhall. Little Warren Verges is in Lincolnshire and Ryhall Pasture is in Rutland.

The main grasses on Ryhall Pasture are tor-grass, upright brome and red fescue. The soil is on Jurassic Upper Lincolnshire Limestone, and the rich herb flora include clustered bellflower and greater knapweed. The roadside verges have a diverse calcareous flora, and adjacent hedges are rich in herbs and insect species.

There is public access to the verges but not to the meadow.
