= Lincolnshire Wildlife Trust =

Wildlife conservation charity

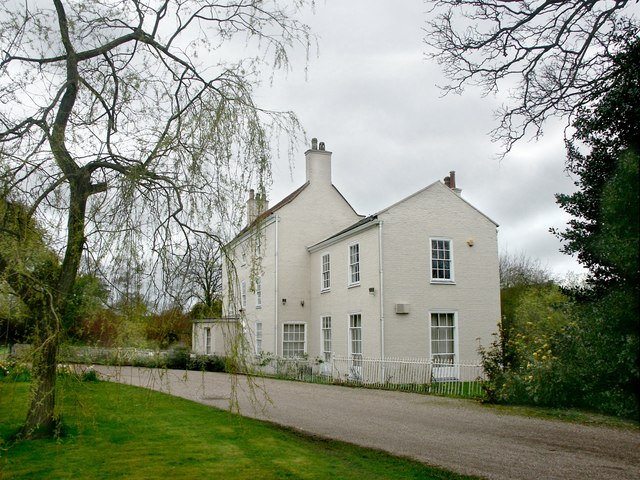
Banovallum House, Lincolnshire Wildlife Trust headquarters

The Lincolnshire Wildlife Trust, (part of the Wildlife Trusts partnership), covers the whole ceremonial county of Lincolnshire, England. It was founded in 1948 as a voluntary charitable organisation dedicated to conserving the wildlife and wild places of Lincolnshire and to promoting the understanding and enjoyment of the natural world.

== Description ==
Its headquarters are at Banovallum House, Manor House Street, Horncastle. It has over 27,000 members and manages 95 nature reserves with a total area of 8,520 acres (34.49 km^{2}). These include five main visitor-focused reserves used for educational purposes:

- Gibraltar Point National Nature Reserve opened in 1949 and was the first nature reserve to be purchased by the Trust. A reserve of sand dunes, salt marsh and brackish pools situated on the coast 3 miles (5 km) south of Skegness. Facilities include two car parks and a visitors' centre with a cafe, shop and toilets.
- Far Ings National Nature Reserve opened in 1973. A reserve of lakes, reedbeds and meadows situated in the north of the county on the south bank of the Humber Estuary 2 miles (3 km) west of Barton upon Humber. Facilities provided include car parking, toilets, shop and classroom.
- Whisby Nature Park opened in 1989. A reserve of lakes, meadows and immature woodland situated in the west of the county alongside the A46 Lincoln by-pass. Facilities include car parking, an education centre with a laboratory and a classroom, an adventure playground for children and the 'Natural World Centre' with toilets, café, shop and temporary and permanent exhibitions. (The car parks, adventure playground and 'Natural World Centre' are managed by North Kesteven District Council).
- Snipe Dales Country Park & Nature Reserve opened in 1974. A reserve that is part wet grassland and scrub and part conifer woodland situated in the centre of the county on the B1195 Horncastle to Spilsby road. The coniferous woodland is currently being replaced by native broadleaved trees. Facilities include car parking and toilets.
- Deeping Lakes Nature Reserve opened in 2004. A reserve of lakes and immature woodland situated in the south of the county on the north bank of the River Welland, it is 3 miles (5 km) east of Deeping St James on the B1166 road. Only car parking is provided while the site is being developed.

The Trust employs 78 full and part-time staff who are aided by more than 1,300 volunteers drawn mainly from Trust's 16 area groups (members' groups), each of which is based on one of the county's main towns. The area groups also organise meetings, visits and social events and are involved in fundraising and membership recruitment.

5,000 of the Trust's members are under 16 years of age; these are catered for by the organisation's junior wing Wildlife Watch which runs seven groups around the county organising events for children.

The Trust's income is derived mainly from members' subscriptions, money raised by area groups and members, donations, grants from local authorities and government agencies (usually for special projects), profits from the Trust's sales business and from legacies.

== Sites ==
=== Key ===
==== Public access ====
- BPA = access only by prior arrangement with the Trust
- No = no public access
- Yes = public access to all or most of the site

Site	Image	Area	Location	Public Access	Classifications	Description
Ancaster Valley		10 hectares (25 acres)	52.978924°N 0.53591996°W	Yes		A steep-sided valley best known for its flower-rich limestone grassland. Plants include pasqueflower, bee orchid, dyer's greenweed and dropwort, whilst birds recorded at the site include Eurasian green woodpecker and great spotted woodpecker.
Anderby Marsh		24 hectares (59 acres)	53.256569°N 0.32207716°E			
Arnold's Meadow		3 hectares (7.4 acres)	52.778972°N 0.13317943°E			
Banovallum House		1 hectare (2.5 acres)	53.207712°N 0.11933892°E			
Barrow Blow Wells		3 hectares (7.4 acres)	53.684185°N 0.37762291°W	Yes	LNR	Reedmarshes and woodland centred around two blow wells (natural artesian springs).
Barrow Haven Reedbed		13 hectares (32 acres)	53.697929°N 0.39716479°W	Yes	LNR	Reedbed in flooded, disused clay pits.
Baston Fen		33 hectares (82 acres)	52.743907°N 0.30529738°W			
Bloxholm Wood		30 hectares (74 acres)				
Boston Road Bricks		2 hectares (4.9 acres)				
Boultham Mere		19 hectares (47 acres)				
Candlesby Hill Quarry		2 hectares (4.9 acres)				
Chapel Pit		3 hectares (7.4 acres)				
Clapgate Pits		1 hectare (2.5 acres)				Former quarry
Crowle Moor		188 hectares (460 acres)				
Dawson City Clay Pits		16 hectares (40 acres)				
Deeping Lakes		71 hectares (180 acres)	52.656675°N 0.25064869°W	Yes	LNR, SSSI	Flooded former gravel pits. Wildfowl and wetland site.
Digby Corner		1 hectare (2.5 acres)				
Dole Wood		8 hectares (20 acres)				
Donna Nook National Nature Reserve		1,150 hectares (2,800 acres)	53°28′29″N 000°09′07″E	Yes	NNR	Coastal salt marsh noted for its annual grey seal breeding population.
Duke's Covert and Copper Hill		2 hectares (4.9 acres)				
Epworth Turbary		33 hectares (82 acres)				
Fairfield Pit		9 hectares (22 acres)				
Far Ings National Nature Reserve		59 hectares (150 acres)	53.696838°N 0.45998523°W	Yes	NNR, SSSI, Ramsar site	Reedbeds on flooded former clay pits. Wildfowl and wetland site.
Fir Hill Quarry		1 hectare (2.5 acres)				
Fiskerton Fen		7 hectares (17 acres)				
Frampton Marsh		172 hectares (430 acres)	52.9263°N 0.0266°E			
Friskney Decoy Wood		6 hectares (15 acres)				
Furze Hill		5 hectares (12 acres)				
Gibraltar Point National Nature Reserve		437 hectares (1,080 acres)	53.09641°N 0.32838°E		NNR	
Goslings Corner Wood		10 hectares (25 acres)				
Great Casterton Road Banks		1 hectare (2.5 acres)	52.663°N 0.514°W			
Greetwell Hollow		13 hectares (32 acres)				
Hatton Meadows		4 hectares (9.9 acres)				
Haxey Turbary		15 hectares (37 acres)				
Heath's Meadows		6 hectares (15 acres)				
Hopland's Wood		14 hectares (35 acres)				
Horbling Line		1 hectare (2.5 acres)				
Huttoft Bank Pit		4 hectares (9.9 acres)				
Keal Carr		12 hectares (30 acres)				
Killingholme Haven Pits		32 hectares (79 acres)				
Kingerby Beck Meadows		9 hectares (22 acres)				
Kirkby Gravel Pits		15 hectares (37 acres)				
Kirkby Moor		75 hectares (190 acres)				
Landholme Wood		11 hectares (27 acres)				
Lawn Wood, and Bottleneck and Jackson's Meadows		12 hectares (30 acres)				
Legbourne Wood		35 hectares (86 acres)				
Linwood Warren		28 hectares (69 acres)				
Messingham Sand Quarry		40 hectares (99 acres)				
Mill Hill Quarry		2 hectares (4.9 acres)				
Moor Closes		6 hectares (15 acres)				
Moor Farm		48 hectares (120 acres)				
Moulton Marsh		36 hectares (89 acres)				
Muckton Wood		17 hectares (42 acres)				
Pasture Wharf		21 hectares (52 acres)				
Pickering's Meadow		3 hectares (7.4 acres)				
Pinchbeck Slipe		22 hectares (54 acres)				
Rauceby Warren		9 hectares (22 acres)				
Red Hill		27 hectares (67 acres)				
Rigsby Wood		15 hectares (37 acres)				
Robert's Field		4 hectares (9.9 acres)				
Roughton Moor Wood		10 hectares (25 acres)				
Rush Furlong		3 hectares (7.4 acres)				
Saltfleetby – Threddlethorpe Dunes		951 hectares (2,350 acres)	53.4023°N 0.2064°E		NNR	
Sandilands Pit		1 hectare (2.5 acres)				
Scotton Common		64 hectares (160 acres)				
Sedge Hole Close		1 hectare (2.5 acres)				
Silverines Meadows		6 hectares (15 acres)				
Snipe Dales		87 hectares (210 acres)	53.196°N 0.005°W			
Sotby Meadows		6 hectares (15 acres)				
South Witham Verges		6 hectares (15 acres)				
Sow Dale		34 hectares (84 acres)				
Spendluffe Meadows		5 hectares (12 acres)				
Stanton's Pit		8 hectares (20 acres)			LNR	
Swinn Wood		20 hectares (49 acres)			LNR	
Surfleet Lows		3 hectares (7.4 acres)				
Tetney Blow Wells		15 hectares (37 acres)				
The Shrubberies		5 hectares (12 acres)				
Thurlby Fen Slipe		8 hectares (20 acres)				
Toby's Hill		9 hectares (22 acres)				
Toft Tunnel		3 hectares (7.4 acres)				
Tortoiseshell Wood and Porter's Lodge Meadows		21 hectares (52 acres)				
Tunman Wood		53 hectares (130 acres)				
Watts Wood		3 hectares (7.4 acres)				
Welton-le-Wold		2 hectares (4.9 acres)				
Whisby Nature Park		144 hectares (360 acres)				
Willoughby Branch Line		5 hectares (12 acres)				
Willoughby Meadow		5 hectares (12 acres)				
Willow Tree Fen		112 hectares (280 acres)				
Wolla Bank Pit		4 hectares (9.9 acres)				
Wolla Bank Reedbed		3 hectares (7.4 acres)				
Woodhall Spa Airfield Nature Reserve			53.130728°N 0.19893587°W	BPA	NNR	Former airfield and gravel quarry.
