= List of Sites of Special Scientific Interest in Kent =

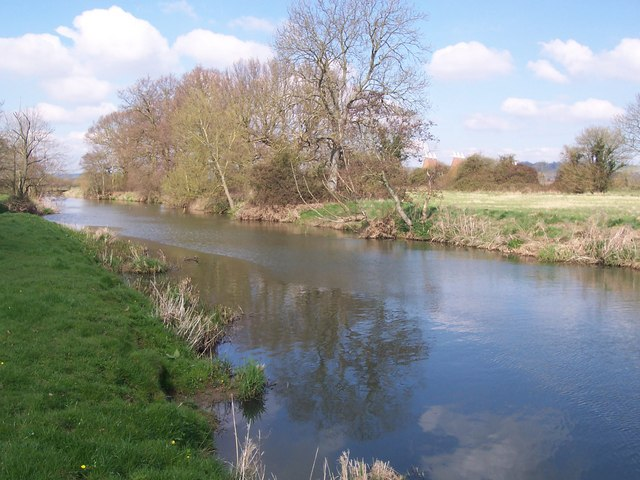
The River Beult north-east of Paddock Wood

Kent is a county in the south-eastern corner of England. It is bounded to the north by Greater London and the Thames Estuary, to the west by Sussex and Surrey, and to the south and east by the English Channel and the North Sea. The county town is Maidstone. It is governed by Kent County Council, with twelve district councils, Ashford, Canterbury, Dartford, Dover, Folkestone and Hythe, Gravesham, Maidstone, Thanet, Tonbridge and Malling and Tunbridge Wells. Medway is a separate unitary authority. The chalk hills of the North Downs run from east to west through the county, with the wooded Weald to the south. The coastline is alternately flat and cliff-lined.

In England, Sites of Special Scientific Interest (SSSIs) are designated by Natural England, which is responsible for protecting England's natural environment. Designation as an SSSI gives legal protection to the most important wildlife and geological sites. As of May 2018, there are 98 sites designated in Kent. There are 21 sites which have been designated for their geological interest, 67 for their biological interest, and 10 for both reasons.

Sixteen sites are Special Areas of Conservation, eight are Special Protection Areas, twenty-three are Nature Conservation Review sites, thirty-three are Geological Conservation Review sites, eleven are national nature reserves, nine are Ramsar internationally important wetland sites, eleven are local nature reserves, thirteen are in Areas of Outstanding Natural Beauty, one is on the Register of Historic Parks and Gardens of Special Historic Interest in England and two contain scheduled monuments. Seventeen sites are managed by the Kent Wildlife Trust, four by the Royal Society for the Protection of Birds and seven by the National Trust.

== Key ==
=== Interest ===
- B = site of biological interest
- G = site of geological interest

=== Public access ===
- FP = access to footpaths through the site only
- NO = no public access to site
- PP = public access to part of site
- YES = public access to all or most of the site

=== Other classifications ===
- AONB = Area of Outstanding Natural Beauty
- KWT = Kent Wildlife Trust
- GCR = Geological Conservation Review site
- LNR = Local nature reserve
- NCR = Nature Conservation Review site
- NNR = National nature reserve
- NT = National Trust
- Plant = Plantlife, a wild plant conservation charity
- Ramsar = Ramsar site, an internationally important wetland site
- RHPG = Register of Historic Parks and Gardens of Special Historic Interest in England
- RSPB = Royal Society for the Protection of Birds
- SAC = Special Area of Conservation
- SM = Scheduled monument
- SPA = Special Protection Area under the European Union Directive on the Conservation of Wild Birds

== Sites ==
Sites
Site name	Photograph	B	G	Area (Note: The area and grid reference are taken from the "Details" page for each site on the Natural England database.)	Public access	Location	Other classifications	Map (Note: The maps are provided by Natural England on the Magic Map website.)	Citation (Note: Citations are provided for each site by Natural England.)	Description
Alex Farm Pastures	Alex Farm Pastures	✓		4.5 hectares (11 acres)	NO	Ashford; 51.097°N 0.806°E; TQ 966 368		Map	Citation	This site has unimproved neutral grassland, which is a nationally rare habitat. Some of it has been lost to scrub, but in other areas it is maintained by rabbit grazing. There are several uncommon butterflies, including the nationally scarce pearl-bordered fritillary and small pearl-bordered fritillary.
Alkham, Lydden and Swingfield Woods	Alkham, Lydden and Swingfield Woods	✓		228.3 hectares (564 acres)	PP	Dover; 51.148°N 1.23°E; TR 260 437	NCR	Map	Citation	This site is composed of several steeply sloping woods on chalk soil, together with an area of chalk grassland. The ground flora is diverse, including some unusual plants such as lady orchid in the woods and burnt orchid in the meadow.
Allington Quarry	Allington Quarry		✓	0.8 hectares (2.0 acres)	NO	Maidstone; 51.29°N 0.498°E; TQ 743 575	GCR	Map	Citation	This Pleistocene site has an extensive section through gulls (cracks in the rock) which are filled with loess. These were probably produced by seasonal freezing and thawing during the last ice age.
Aylesford Pit	Aylesford Pit		✓	1.5 hectares (3.7 acres)	NO	Aylesford; 51.308°N 0.481°E; TQ 730 595	GCR	Map	Citation	This Pleistocene site in the terrace of the River Medway has yielded many mammalian bones and paleolithic artefacts, but its geographical isolation from the main Thames sequence makes precise correlation of Aylesford rocks with those laid down at the same time in Thames sites uncertain.
Baker's Hole	Bakers Hole		✓	6.9 hectares (17 acres)	NO	Swanscombe; 51.444°N 0.317°E; TQ 611 742	GCR	Map	Citation	This internationally renowned site has yielded the largest number of stone tools and flakes in Britain dating to the Early Middle Paleolithic (325,000 to 180,000 year ago). Most of them were produced by Neanderthals using the Levallois technique.
Bourne Alder Carr	Bourne Alder Carr	✓		13.5 hectares (33 acres)	PP	Sevenoaks; 51.271°N 0.301°E; TQ 606 549		Map	Citation	The River Bourne runs through a shallow valley, and frequent flushing of the woodland on the banks with water rich in nutrients creates a rich ground flora. There is also an area of swamp around a fish pond.
Brookland Wood	Brookland Wood	✓		10.9 hectares (27 acres)	PP	Tunbridge Wells; 51.124°N 0.371°E; TQ 660 387		Map	Citation	This site has diverse types of woodland and ground flora. Alder is dominant in wet areas and hazel, ash and field maple in drier ones. Small streams have a variety of mosses and liverworts.
Charing Beech Hangers	Charing Beech Hangers	✓		52.6 hectares (130 acres)	PP	Ashford; 51.201°N 0.831°E; TQ 979 484		Map	Citation	This steeply sloping site has mature beech and oak, and the ground flora is varied with some uncommon species. Invertebrates include the rare slug Limax tenellus and several scarce moths.
Chattenden Woods and Lodge Hill	Great Chattenden Wood	✓		351.0 hectares (867 acres)	PP	Rochester; 51.432°N 0.525°E; TQ 756 734		Map	Citation	This site has diverse habitats, including ancient semi-natural woodland, grassland and scrub. There are nationally important numbers of nightingales in the woods and scrub during the breeding season, and invertebrates include nationally scarce moths.
Chequer's Wood and Old Park	Chequer's Wood and Old Park	✓	✓	106.9 hectares (264 acres)	NO	Canterbury; 51.285°N 1.115°E; TR 173 586	GCR	Map	Citation	This site includes Fordwich Pit, which has yielded a large collection of early Acheulian handaxes, between 550,000 and 300,000 old. Habitats include alder wood in a valley bottom, acidic grassland on dry sandy soil, oak and birch woodland, scrub and a pond.
Church Woods, Blean	Church Woods, Blean	✓		526.7 hectares (1,302 acres)	YES	Canterbury; 51.301°N 1.015°E; TR 103 601	NCR, NNR, RSPB, SAC	Map	Citation	This broadleaved coppice with standards wood has a diverse range of trees, a rich ground flora, a wide variety of birds and many uncommon invertebrates, including the nationally rare heath fritillary butterfly.
Cobham Woods	Cobham Woods	✓		242.7 hectares (600 acres)	YES	Rochester; 51.388°N 0.439°E; TQ 698 683	AONB, NT	Map	Citation	These woods are partly on acidic Thanet Sands and partly on chalk soils. There is also an area of arable land which has some uncommon plants, including the very rare and protected rough marsh-mallow, which has been recorded on the site since 1792.
Combwell Wood	Combwell Wood	✓		110.6 hectares (273 acres)	FP	Cranbrook; 51.081°N 0.434°E; TQ 706 341	AONB	Map	Citation	Much of this ancient wood has traditionally been coppiced, but there has probably been undisturbed woodland on steep slopes, and uncommon bryophytes here are thought to be survivors from the Atlantic warm period around 5,000 years ago. There are also several nationally scarce water beetles.
Cowden Meadow	owden Meadow	✓		1.1 hectares (2.7 acres)	FP	Edenbridge; 51.153°N 0.115°E; TQ 480 414		Map	Citation	This site has flora which are found on grassland sites which have not been cultivated for many years, such as quaking grass, oxeye daisy and pepper saxifrage. Wetter areas are dominated by hard rush.
Cowden Pound Pastures	Cowden Pound Pastures	✓		5.9 hectares (15 acres)	NO	Edenbridge; 51.169°N 0.086°E; TQ 459 432	KWT	Map	Citation	This is unimproved neutral grassland, which is a nationally rare habitat, and it is grazed to prevent scrub invading the pasture. Grasses include crested dog's tail and common knapweed, and an area of wet grassland by a stream has jointed rush and water mint.
Dalham Farm	Dalham Farm		✓	8.8 hectares (22 acres)	PP	Rochester; 51.449°N 0.557°E; TQ 778 753	GCR	Map	Citation	The farm shows mass movement of rock and soil on a shallow 8% slope of London Clay, which is seen in ridges across the site. It may be the lowest angled slope failure in Britain, and is important in demonstrating slope degradation where there is no coastal erosion.
Darenth Wood	Darenth Wood	✓		122.9 hectares (304 acres)	YES	Dartford; 51.426°N 0.267°E; TQ 577 721		Map	Citation	This ancient semi-natural wood has many rare invertebrates, including thirty-two which are nationally scarce and two which are nationally rare: these are beetles which live in dead and dying oak timber, Grilis pannonicus and Platypus cylindricus.
Dover to Kingsdown Cliffs	Dover to Kingsdown Cliffs	✓	✓	207.7 hectares (513 acres)	YES	Dover; 51.146°N 1.371°E; TR 359 439	GCR, NT, SAC	Map	Citation	The cliffs expose fossiliferous rocks dating to 99 and 86 million years ago, during the Late Cretaceous, which are historically important as many geological principles were tested there. The cliffs have many breeding sea birds, and there are diverse algae on the foreshore.
Down Bank	Down Bank	✓		5.9 hectares (15 acres)	FP	Canterbury; 51.23°N 0.982°E; TR 083 521		Map	Citation	This sloping chalk meadow has the nationally endangered black-veined moth and twenty-eight species of butterfly, including the nationally scarce Duke of Burgundy. Grassland flora include two nationally scarce species, small bedstraw and man orchid.
Dryhill	Dryhill		✓	11.7 hectares (29 acres)	YES	Sevenoaks; 51.276°N 0.149°E; TQ 500 552	GCR, LNR	Map	Citation	This former quarry exposes rocks dating to the Aptian stage in the early Cretaceous, around 120 million years ago. It is famous for its rich and diverse brachiopod and bivalve fossils, which are important for palaeoecological research.
Dungeness, Romney Marsh and Rye Bay	Dungeness, Romney Marsh and Rye Bay	✓	✓	10,172.9 hectares (25,138 acres)	PP	Romney Marsh; 50.946°N 0.857°E; TR 008 202	AONB, GCR, KWT, LNR, NNR, Ramsar, RSPB, SAC, SPA	Map (Note: Dungeness, Romney Marsh and Rye Bay and High Rocks are partly in East Sussex)	Citation	Nationally important habitats in this site are saltmarsh, sand dunes, vegetated shingle, saline lagoons, standing waters, lowland ditch systems, and basin fens, and it has many rare and endangered species of fauna and flora. It is geologically important as its deposits display the chronology of coastal evolution.
East Blean Woods	East Blean Woods	✓		151.3 hectares (374 acres)	YES	Canterbury; 51.335°N 1.14°E; TR 188 642	KWT, NCR, NNR SAC	Map	Citation	This site has mixed coppice with some mature oaks. Insects include the rare and protected heath fritillary butterfly, and there is a wide variety of woodland birds.
Ellenden Wood	Ellenden Wood	✓		90.6 hectares (224 acres)	YES	Whitstable; 51.322°N 1.014°E; TR 101 624	NCR, SAC	Map	Citation	This wood has diverse flora with over 250 species of vascular plants and 300 of fungi. Insects include 3 species which are nationally rare, and there are mammals such as wood mice, dormice and two species of shrew.
Farningham Wood	Farningham Wood	✓		74.2 hectares (183 acres)	YES	Dartford; 51.391°N 0.213°E; TQ 541 681	LNR	Map	Citation	This wood has a variety of soil conditions, resulting in diverse ground flora and invertebrates, some of which are typical ancient woodland. Ponds in the middle support several species of amphibian, and the nationally rare hoverfly Volucella inanis has been recorded on the site.
Folkestone to Etchinghill Escarpment	Folkestone to Etchinghill Escarpment	✓	✓	263.2 hectares (650 acres)	PP	Folkestone; 51.103°N 1.13°E; TR 192 384	GCR, NCR, SAC	Map	Citation	A large area of chalk grassland has three nationally rare plants, late spider orchid, early spider orchid and bedstraw broomrape. Asholt Wood has outstanding lichen flora. The site also includes Holywell Coombe, a key geological site displaying the sequence of mollusc fossils in the late Pleistocene and Holocene.
Folkestone Warren	Folkestone Warren	✓	✓	316.3 hectares (782 acres)	PP	Folkestone; 51.099°N 1.237°E; TR 267 383	GCR, LNR, NCR	Map	Citation	These chalk cliffs have several nationally rare plants and they provide a location for cliff nesting and wintering birds. The SSSI also contains two internationally important reference sites for study of the Cretaceous period.
Gibbin's Brook	Gibbin's Brook	✓		16.8 hectares (42 acres)	YES	Ashford; 51.107°N 1.021°E; TR 116 385		Map	Citation	This site is mainly marshy grassland, but it also has a stream, a pond and small areas of bog and dry acidic grassland. It is notable for its invertebrates, especially moths.
Great Crabbles Wood	Great Crabbles Wood	✓		33.0 hectares (82 acres)	YES	Gravesend; 51.406°N 0.446°E; TQ 702 703		Map	Citation	Most of the wood is mixed coppice, with sweet chestnut dominant and oak standards. There are scarce flora such as lady and man and bird's nest orchids, white helleborine and wild liquorice.
Great Shuttlesfield Down	Great Shuttlesfield Down	✓		21.8 hectares (54 acres)	FP	Folkestone; 51.126°N 1.108°E; TR 176 409		Map	Citation	This unimproved grassland is dominated by sheep's fescue, upright brome and tor-grass, and it is grazed by sheep and cattle. Notable invertebrates are the rare adonis blue butterfly and two solitary wasps, Crossocerus cetratus and Crossocerus styrius.
Greatness Brickworks	Greatness Brickworks		✓	7.8 hectares (19 acres)	NO	Sevenoaks; 51.298°N 0.200°E; TQ 535 577	GCR,	Map	Citation	This Cretaceous site is highly fossiliferous, with many ammonites. It is described by Natural England as "of vital importance in biostratigraphic research on the Gault of the Weald".
Halling to Trottiscliffe Escarpment	Halling to Trottiscliffe Escarpment	✓		600.6 hectares (1,484 acres)	PP	Rochester; 51.350°N 0.404°E; TQ 675 640	NCR, SAC	Map	Citation	This site on the North Downs has grassland and beech woodland on chalk soil. It is entomologically important, with uncommon insects such as the bug Psylla viburni, and it is the only known location in Britain for the moth Hypercallia citrinalis.
Ham Street Woods	Ham Street Woods	✓		175.2 hectares (433 acres)	YES	Ashford; 51.073°N 0.866°E; TR 009 343	NCR, NNR	Map	Citation	This semi-natural wood is more than 400 years old, and it has rich and diverse invertebrates, including 12 rare or scarce dead wood species, such as the nationally rare beetle, Tomoxia biguttata.
Hart Hill	Hart Hill		✓	1.4 hectares (3.5 acres)	NO	Ashford; 51.222°N 0.780°E; TQ 942 506	GCR	Map	Citation	This site is controversial as it exposes the Lenham Beds, the date of which have been disputed, but they are now thought to be Pliocene on the basis of their marine bivalves and gastropods.
Hatch Park	Hatch Park	✓		71.8 hectares (177 acres)	NO	Ashford; 51.129°N 0.946°E; TR 062 408	RHPG	Map	Citation	This site has species-rich acidic grassland which is the remnant of a larger deer park, and is still managed by a herd of deer. There are also ancient pollard woods which are the richest for epiphytic lichens in the county. Several ponds have adjacent areas of marsh.
High Rocks	High Rocks		✓	3.3 hectares (8.2 acres)	PP	Tunbridge Wells; 51.113°N 0.226°E; TQ 559 383	GCR	Map	Citation	This Pleistocene site is described by Natural England as "a key geomorphological site for sandstone weathering features developed on the highest cliffs in the Weald". The Ardingly Sandstone has micro-cracking of unknown origin.
Hoad's Wood	Hoad's Wood	✓		80.5 hectares (199 acres)	NO	Ashford; 51.148°N 0.790°E; TQ 952 425		Map	Citation	This oak and hornbeam wood is outstanding for its insects, especially butterflies and moths, with two which are nationally rare, the broad-bordered beehawk and black-veined moths. There are diverse breeding birds.
Holborough to Burham Marshes	Holborough to Burham Marshes	✓		149.8 hectares (370 acres)	YES	Snodland; 51.328°N 0.456°E; TQ 712 616	KWT	Map	Citation	This site is in the tidal flood plain of the River Medway. It has diverse habitats, with reedbeds, fen, grassland, woodland, scrub and a flooded gravel pit, which attracts wintering wildfowl. There are five rare invertebrates, including three bee species.
Hollingbourne Downs	Hollingbourne Downs	✓		60.9 hectares (150 acres)	YES	Maidstone; 51.270°N 0.649°E; TQ 849 557		Map	Citation	This escarpment has unimproved chalk grassland and beech woodland. The dominant grasses are tor-grass, upright brome and sheep's fescue, and shrub species on woodland margins include the wayfaring-tree and traveller's-joy.
Hothfield Common	Hothfield Common	✓		56.5 hectares (140 acres)	YES	Ashford; 51.178°N 0.814°E; TQ 968 458	KWT, LNR	Map	Citation	This site has areas of heath and the best valley bog in the county, both habitats which are uncommon in Kent. Over a thousand insect species have been recorded, several of which are nationally rare, such as the bee Lasioglossum semilucens and the cranefly Tipula holoptera.
Houlder and Monarch Hill Pits, Upper Halling	Houlder and Monarch Hill Pits		✓	0.7 hectares (1.7 acres)	NO	Rochester; 51.345°N 0.425°E; TQ 690 634	GCR	Map	Citation	This site has a sequence of deposits covering the end of the last glacial period, with two sheets of glacial deposits separated by a fossil soil assigned to the late glacial interstadial around 13,000 years ago. It provides evidence of lithostratigraphic and biostratigraphic changes during this period.
Hubbard's Hill	Hubbard's Hill		✓	66.6 hectares (165 acres)	YES	Sevenoaks; 51.247°N 0.196°E; TQ 534 520	GCR	Map	Citation	This Quaternary site exhibits solifluction (erosion by freezing and thawing). The main deposits date to the Wolstonian glaciation around 130,000 years ago, but the latest have radiocarbon dates of only 12,500 years, during the most recent Younger Dryas ice age.
Ileden and Oxenden Woods	Ileden and Oxenden Woods	✓		86.4 hectares (213 acres)	YES	Canterbury; 51.228°N 1.175°E; TR 218 524		Map	Citation	These woods have a variety of soil types and diverse habitats. There is a rich bird community and ground flora, including two nationally rare orchids, narrow-lipped helleborine and lady orchid.
Knole Park	Knole Park	✓		383.4 hectares (947 acres)	YES	Sevenoaks; 51.262°N 0.210°E; TQ 543 538	AONB.NT	Map	Citation	The park has acidic woodland, parkland, woods and ponds. It has the best ancient woodland invertebrates in the county, including the nationally rare beetle Platypus cylindrus and several nationally scarce species, and it also has a rich fungus flora.
Larkey Valley Wood	Larkey Valley Wood	✓		44.1 hectares (109 acres)	YES	Canterbury; 51.257°N 1.044°E; TR 125 553	LNR	Map	Citation	This wood has diverse ground flora with some uncommon plants and many breeding birds, such as tree pipits, nuthatches and hawfinches. Flora include the scarce lady orchid.
Lenham Quarry	Lenham Quarry		✓	4.0 hectares (9.9 acres)	YES	Maidstone; 51.240°N 0.741°E; TQ 914 525	GCR	Map	Citation	This site has been assigned to the Pliocene on the basis of its gastropod, bivalve and serpulid worm fossils. It is important because there are few exposures dating from this period in Britain.
Lullingstone Park	Lullingstone Park	✓		66.4 hectares (164 acres)	YES	Sevenoaks; 51.355°N 0.171°E; TQ 513 640	SM,	Map	Citation	Some of the pollards in this wood are over 400 years old, and it is important for invertebrates, lichens, breeding birds and fungi. Over 340 beetle species have been recorded, including two which are nationally rare.
Lydden and Temple Ewell Downs	Lydden and Temple Ewell Downs	✓		63.2 hectares (156 acres)	YES	Dover; 51.162°N 1.252°E; TR 275 453	AONB, KWT NCR, NNR SAC	Map	Citation	This site has some of the richest chalk downland in the county. The invertebrate community is outstanding, including butterflies such as marbled whites, adonis blue and the very rare silver-spotted skipper.
Lympne Escarpment	Lympne Escarpment	✓		140.2 hectares (346 acres)	PP	Hythe; 51.070°N 1.030°E; TR 124 344	SM.	Map	Citation	This steeply sloping site has woodland and grassland on Kentish ragstone, with many springs and flushes at the base. It is close to the sea, and the resulting high humidity allows plants such as stinking iris, which are usually confined to woods, to grow in grassland.
Lynsore Bottom	Lynsore Bottom	✓		70.6 hectares (174 acres)	YES	Canterbury; 51.189°N 1.090°E; TR 160 479		Map	Citation	These coppice with standards woods have a variety of tree species. The ground flora is diverse, and the woods are also important for their breeding birds, including tawny owls, grasshopper warblerss and hawfinches.
Magpie Bottom	Magpie Bottom	✓		51.9 hectares (128 acres)	YES	Sevenoaks; 51.329°N 0.216°E; TQ 545 612		Map	Citation	This steeply sloping area of chalk grassland has diverse herb flora, including the nationally rare Kentish milkwort and seven species of orchid, such as the scarce man orchid. There are also areas of woodland and scrub.
Marden Meadows	Marden Meadow	✓		3.7 hectares (9.1 acres)	PP	Tonbridge; 51.173°N 0.518°E; TQ 761 445	KWT	Map	Citation	These unimproved neutral meadows are cut for hay each year and then grazed. There are also ponds and hedgerows which are probably of ancient origin, and trees include midland hawthorns and wild service-trees.
Medway Estuary and Marshes	Medway Estuary and Marshes	✓		4,478.8 hectares (11,067 acres)	PP	Sittingbourne; 51.408°N 0.657°E; TQ 849 710	NCR, Ramsar, SPA	Map	Citation	This site is internationally important for its wintering birds, and nationally important for its breeding birds. It is also has an outstanding flora, such as the nationally rare oak-leaved goosefoot and the nationally scarce slender hare's-ear.
Northward Hill	Northward Hill	✓		52.5 hectares (130 acres)	YES	Rochester; 51.457°N 0.562°E; TQ 781 762	NCR, NNR, RSPB.	Map	Citation	This site has mixed woodland, scrub, ponds, grassland and bracken. It has the largest heronry in Britain, with more than 200 pairs, and insects include the scarce sloe carpet and least carpet moths.
Oaken Wood	Oaken Wood		✓	18.7 hectares (46 acres)	YES	Maidstone; 51.267°N 0.437°E; TQ 701 548	GCR,	Map	Citation	This site provides the best example of a very unusual topography, with cracking and tilting of underlying weaker strata during the Pleistocene by periglacial processes producing crests and troughs in the surface rocks.
Oldbury and Seal Chart	Oldbury and Seal Chart	✓		212.4 hectares (525 acres)	YES	Sevenoaks; 51.279°N 0.255°E; TQ 574 557	AONB, NT	Map	Citation	More than 250 species of fungi have been recorded in this site, including 10 which are rare or scarce. There are also molluscs which are characteristic of ancient woodland, including the rare snail Phenacolumax major and the scarce slug Limax tenellus.
One Tree Hill and Bitchet Common	One Tree Hill and Bitchet Common	✓		79.2 hectares (196 acres)	YES	Sevenoaks; 51.258°N 0.244°E; TQ 567 534	AONB, NT	Map	Citation	This site has mixed woodland on the Lower Greensand, some of it of ancient origin. The habitats are varied, including acidic soils on Bitchet Common and damp, base-rich soils in Martins Wood. There are several rare plants and invertebrates.
Orlestone Forest	Orlestone Forest	✓		347.6 hectares (859 acres)	PP	Ashford; 51.080°N 0.830°E; TQ 983 350	NCR	Map	Citation	This site is described by Natural England as "an important invertebrate locality of national significance". Hundreds of invertebrate species have been recorded, including 39 which are nationally rare and 134 which are nationally scarce. Several are only known in Britain on this site.
Otford to Shoreham Downs	Otford to Shoreham Downs	✓		145.1 hectares (359 acres)	PP	Sevenoaks; 51.335°N 0.199°E; TQ 533 618	AONB, KWT	Map	Citation	These downs have woodland, scrub and species-rich chalk grassland, which has been traditionally managed by grazing. A decline in grazing has caused the chalk downland to become overgrown, but it is still very species diverse, with over a hundred plants recorded.
Otterpool Quarry	Otterpool Quarry		✓	10.2 hectares (25 acres)	NO	Lympne; 51.088°N 1.014°E; TR 112 364	GCR	Map	Citation	This quarry exposes rocks dating to the Cretaceous period, and shows the contact between the Hythe and Sandgate beds. It is very rich in fossil ammonites, with species which can be correlated elsewhere.
Park Wood, Chilham	Park Wood, Chilham	✓		31.1 hectares (77 acres)	YES	Canterbury; 51.236°N 0.925°E; TR 043 526		Map	Citation	This wood is mainly hazel and hornbeam coppice with oak standards, and diverse shrub and ground layers. There are many breeding birds and invertebrates, including two which are rare, the wasp Crossocerus distinguendus and the fly Stratiomys potamida.
Parkgate Down	Parkgate Down	✓		7.0 hectares (17 acres)	YES	Canterbury; 51.171°N 1.010°E; TR 168 459	KWT, SAC	Map	Citation	This downland site has grassland which is grazed by sheep and cattle on the lower slopes and dense scrub on the upper ones. There are a variety of orchids including the uncommon lady and musk orchids.
Parsonage Wood	Parsonage Wood	✓		9.7 hectares (24 acres)	YES	Cranbrook; 51.066°N 0.563°E; TQ 797 328	KWT	Map	Citation	This is an example of a woodland ghyll in the High Weald. The trees are mainly coppiced, but some of the ground flora are species which are indicative of ancient woods, such as butcher's broom, violet helleborine and pendulous sedge.
Pembury Cutting and Pit	Pembury Cutting and Pit		✓	1.6 hectares (4.0 acres)	PP	Tunbridge Wells; 51.149°N 0.303°E; TQ 612 414	GCR	Map	Citation	This site exposes rocks of the Tunbridge Wells Sand Formation, dating to the Early Cretaceous around 140 to 100 million years ago. There are many fossils of Lycopodites, an extinct plant.
Peter's Pit	Peters Pit	✓		28.7 hectares (71 acres)	FP	Rochester; 51.337°N 0.464°E; TQ 717 627	SAC	Map	Citation	This was formerly a chalk quarry and it has an undulating terrain. There are many ponds, some of which have populations of the great crested newt, a protected species under the Wildlife and Countryside Act 1981. The site has two reptiles, grass snakes and common European adders.
Polebrook Farm	Polebrook Farm	✓		13.0 hectares (32 acres)	PP	Edenbridge; 51.208°N 0.155°E; TQ 506 476		Map	Citation	The field layout of this farm is believed to have remained unchanged for over 700 years. The hedges and meadows have a rich variety of flora, with at least 19 species of grasses.
Preston Marshes	Preston Marshes	✓		43.4 hectares (107 acres)	NO	Canterbury; 51.297°N 1.202°E; TR 233 602		Map	Citation	This site in the valley of the River Little Stour is dominated by common reed, with areas of willow scrub and pasture. There are many beeding and wintering birds, such as reed buntings and sedge warblers.
Purple Hill	Purple Hill	✓		14.9 hectares (37 acres)	NO	Maidstone; 51.330°N 0.600°E; TQ 812 622	NCR	Map	Citation	This chalk downland site has herb-rich grassland, scrub and woods. Flora include the nationally rare Kentish milkwort and several uncommon orchids.
Queendown Warren	Queendown Warren	✓		22.2 hectares (55 acres)	YES	Sittingbourne; 51.336°N 0.623°E; TQ 828 629	AONB, KWT, LNR, NCR, Plant, SAC	Map	Citation	This site has dry grassland and woodland on a south facing slope. It has two rare plants, early spider orchid and meadow clary, and a rich variety of insects.
River Beult	River Beult	✓		29.1 hectares (72 acres)	PP	Tonbridge; 51.193°N 0.526°E; TQ 766 468		Map	Citation	The river has a varied clay river flora, with nearly 100 recorded species. There are floating plants such as yellow water-lily in the channel and flora on the banks include amphibious bistort and celery-leaved buttercup.
Robins Wood	Robins Wood	✓		47.7 hectares (118 acres)	FP	Cranbrook; 51.076°N 0.522°E; TQ 768 338		Map	Citation	This is a deep valley along a stream in the Weald, and has the humid conditions typical of such areas. It has a diverse flora of mosses, ferns and liverworts, and woodland which is thought to date back to recolonisation after the last ice age ended 11,700 years ago.
Rusthall Common	Rusthall Common		✓	2.7 hectares (6.7 acres)	YES	Tunbridge Wells; 51.133°N 0.240°E; TQ 568 395	GCR	Map	Citation	This Quaternary site is important for its examples of sandstone weathering, especially Toad Rock, which stands on a narrow base moulded by periglacial wind erosion.
Sandwich Bay to Hacklinge Marshes	Sandwich Bay	✓	✓	1,790.1 hectares (4,423 acres)	PP	Sandwich; 51.283°N 1.371°E; TR 352 592	GCR, KWT, LNR, NCR, NNR, Ramsar, SAC, SPA	Map	Citation	This site has over 30 plant species and 168 invertebrates which are nationally rare and nationally scarce, and several wintering birds are present in nationally important numbers. It is also a geologically important site, with diverse fish fossils dating to the Thanetian around 57 million years ago.
Scord's Wood and Brockhoult Mount	Brockhoult Mount	✓		252.3 hectares (623 acres)	PP	Westerham; 51.248°N 0.112°E; TQ 475 520	NCR	Map	Citation	This sloping site has the best sessile oak stands in the county. Grasslands on acidic soils are mainly common bent, heath bedstraw and sheep's sorrel, together with some heather and bracken.
Scotney Castle	Scotney Castle	✓		112.5 hectares (278 acres)	YES	Tunbridge Wells; 51.091°N 0.410°E; TQ 689 352	NT	Map	Citation	This site has parkland, grassland, woodland. There are dormice, a protected species, and several nationally scarce invertebrates, such as Rolph's door snail. There are man-made ponds and a moat.
Seabrook Stream	Seabrook Stream	✓		24.1 hectares (60 acres)	PP	Folkestone; 51.087°N 1.109°E; TR 178 366		Map	Citation	The main biological interest of this site lies in the sixty-seven species of cranefly which have been recorded in areas of alder carr and fen. Four are nationally scarce, including Erioptera limbata, which is only known on two other British sites, and there are also fourteen other nationally scarce invertebrate species.
Sevenoaks Gravel Pits	Sevenoaks Gravel Pits	✓		73.7 hectares (182 acres)	PP	Sevenoaks; 51.291°N 0.181°E; TQ 522 569	KWT	Map	Citation	This site has flooded gravel pits which have a variety of breeding and wintering birds. There are thirteen species of dragonfly, and there are also areas of reedbeds and woodland.
Sheppey Cliffs and Foreshore	Sheppey Cliffs and Foreshore	✓	✓	303.6 hectares (750 acres)	PP	Sheerness; 51.421°N 0.865°E; TQ 993 730	GCR	Map	Citation	This site exposes Eocene London Clay with well preserved fossil fauna and flora, which have been studied since the eighteenth century. Flora include tropical lianas. The site is botanically important for the nationally rare dragon's teeth.
Shorne and Ashenbank Woods	Ashenbank Wood	✓		197.4 hectares (488 acres)	YES	Gravesend; 51.403°N 0.414°E; TQ 680 699		Map	Citation	These woods have diverse and important invertebrates, especially dragonflies, beetles and true bugs, including the rare beetles Mordella holomelaena and Peltodytes caesus. Several clay workings have been landscaped to create shallow ponds designed for wildlife.
Sissinghurst Park Wood	Sissinghurst Park Wood	✓		34.1 hectares (84 acres)	NO	Cranbrook; 51.120°N 0.573°E; TQ 802 388		Map	Citation	This wood is mainly sweet chestnut coppice, and the importance of the site lies in the number of rare plants found in its rides. It is the most eastern locality in Britain for ivy-leaved bellflower.
South Thames Estuary and Marshes	South Thames Estuary and Marshes	✓		5,289.0 hectares (13,069 acres)	PP	Rochester; 51.471°N 0.576°E; TQ 790 778	NCR, Ramsar, RSPB, SPA	Map	Citation	Over 20,000 waterfowl use this site, and some species are present in internationally important numbers. There are nationally scarce plants on dykes, and the diverse invertebra include nationally rare beetles, flies and true bugs.
Southborough Pit	Southborough Pit		✓	1.1 hectares (2.7 acres)	PP	Tunbridge Wells; 51.153°N 0.276°E; TQ 593 418	GCR	Map	Citation	This site dates to the Valanginian age, around 140 million years ago in the Lower Cretaceous. It is the type locality for the High Brooms Soil Bed, which contains the aquatic horsetail Equisetes lyellii.
Spot Lane Quarry	Spot Lane Quarry		✓	0.1 hectares (0.25 acres)	YES	Maidstone; 51.258°N 0.568°E; TQ 793 541	GCR	Map	Citation	This site exposes loess, probably dating to the glacial Wolstonian Stage between 352,000 and 130,000 years ago. It contains the fossils of land snails, and as loess in Britain is usually unfossiliferous, it is one of the few sites where loess fauna can be studied.
Stodmarsh	Stodmarsh	✓		623.2 hectares (1,540 acres)	PP	Canterbury; 51.308°N 1.172°E; TR 212 613	NCR, NNR, Ramsar, SAC, SPA	Map	Citation	This site has flooded gravel pits, scrub, reed beds, grassland and alder carr, with a diverse flora and fauna. Several scarce moths have been recorded and two rare birds, cetti's warbler and the bearded tit, breed in nationally significant numbers.
Sturry Pit	Sturry Pit		✓	0.7 hectares (1.7 acres)	YES	Canterbury; 51.304°N 1.120°E; TR 176 607	GCR	Map	Citation	This former gravel quarry has yielded many hand axes of Middle Acheulian style from the third terrace of the River Stour. It is important for understanding the chronologies of the terraces of the Thames basin in the Pleistocene.
The Swale	The Swale	✓		6,509.4 hectares (16,085 acres)	PP	Faversham; 51.362°N 0.873°E; TR 001 665	KWT, LNR, NCR, NNR, Ramsar, SPA	Map	Citation	This site has mudflats, saltmarsh and fresh water marsh. It has many wildfowl and waders, including internationally important numbers of teal, wigeon and grey plover. The Swale also has a rich variety of invertebrates and plants.
Swanscombe Skull Site	Swanscombe Skull Site		✓	3.9 hectares (9.6 acres)	YES	Swanscombe; 51.444°N 0.297°E; TQ 597 742	GCR, NNR	Map	Citation	The large stone in the photograph marks the place where in 1935 dentist Alvan Marston found the first Lower Paleolithic human fossil in Britain. It is part of the skull of a 400,000 year old early Neanderthal woman, and is one of only two British sites to have yielded human remains from this early period.
Tankerton Slopes	Tankerton Slopes	✓		2.3 hectares (5.7 acres)	YES	Whitstable; 51.364°N 1.045°E; TR 121 672	SAC	Map	Citation	This north facing slope has a population of tall herbs, including the largest population in Britain of hog's fennel, a nationally rare umbellifer. Fauna include Agonopterix putridella, a nationally rare moth whose larvae feed exclusively on hog's fennel.
Thanet Coast	Thanet Coast	✓	✓	816.9 hectares (2,019 acres)	PP	Birchington; 51.380°N 1.279°E; TR 283 696	GCR, LNR, Ramsar, SAC, SPA	Map	Citation	This site has unstable cliffs and foreshore, saltmarsh, lagoons, woodland and grassland. It has internationally important numbers of wintering birds and three nationally rare invertebrates. It is also an important Palaeocene site and paleobotanical locality.
Tower Hill to Cockham Wood	Tower Hill to Cockham Wood	✓	✓	48.8 hectares (121 acres)	PP	Rochester; 51.410°N 0.531°E; TQ 761 709	GCR	Map	Citation	This site contains typical woodland on Tertiary deposits, and sandy areas which have diverse invertebrates, including seven nationally rare bees and wasps. Upnor Quarry exposes a complete sequence of Tertiary rocks.
Trottiscliffe Meadows	Trottiscliffe Meadows	✓		4.8 hectares (12 acres)	FP	West Malling; 51.311°N 0.356°E; TQ 643 595	NCR	Map	Citation	These meadows on gault clay are crossed by calcareous streams, and they are two of the few remaining areas of unimproved grassland in the county. They have a number of uncommon plants, such as marsh valerian, carnation sedge, brown sedge and the rare moss Cratoneuron filicinum.
Wansunt Pit	Wansunt Pit		✓	1.9 hectares (4.7 acres)	PP	Dartford; 51.443°N 0.179°E; TQ 515 738	GCR	Map (Note: Wansunt Pit is partly in Greater London)	Citation	The site exposes the Dartford Heath Gravel. The relationship of this exposure to the Swanscombe sequence and the Thames Terraces is a controversial issue in Thames Pleistocene studies. Stone tools have been found of Homo heidelbergensis, dating from the Hoxnian Stage, an interglacial period between 424,000 and 374,000 years ago.
Wateringbury	Wateringbury		✓	0.2 hectares (0.49 acres)	NO	Maidstone; 51.255°N 0.416°E; TQ 687 534	GCR	Map	Citation	This site contains tufa which displays a complete sequence of molluscs, especially terrestrial snails, dating to the early Holocene, and thus gives a full record of the order in which species colonised the area after the end of the last ice age, the Younger Dryas.
West Blean and Thornden Woods	Thornden Woods	✓		781.0 hectares (1,930 acres)	PP	Herne Bay; 51.328°N 1.088°E; TR 152 633	KWT, NCR	Map	Citation	These woods have more than fifty species of breeding birds, and the diverse invertebrate fauna include five nationally rare and thirteen nationally scarce species. There is also a population of the declining and protected hazel dormouse.
Westerham Mines	Westerham Mines	✓		25.4 hectares (63 acres)	PP	Westerham; 51.257°N 0.084°E; TQ 455 529		Map	Citation	The main interest of this site lies in the use of former mines by five species of bats for hibernation. They are the whiskered, Brandt's, Daubenton's, Natterer's and long-eared bats. Some moths also hibernate in the mines.
Westerham Wood	Westerham Wood	✓		43.3 hectares (107 acres)	NO	Westerham; 51.276°N 0.062°E; TQ 439 550		Map	Citation	This ancient oak wood on Gault Clay is traditionally managed, and it has a diverse ground flora and an outstanding range of breeding birds. The insect fauna is also diverse, and 77 bryophyte and nearly 300 fungus species have been recorded.
Wouldham to Detling Escarpment	Wouldham to Detling Escarpment	✓	✓	311.2 hectares (769 acres)	PP	Chatham; 51.322°N 0.514°E; TQ 753 611	AONB, GCR, KWT, LNR, NCR, SAC	Map	Citation	This stretch of chalk escarpment has woodland, unimproved grassland and scrub. Plants include the nationally rare meadow clary and there are several scarce invertebrates. There are many Mesozoic fossil fishes in an excellent state of preservation.
Wye and Crundale Downs	Wye and Crundale Downs	✓	✓	358.3 hectares (885 acres)	PP	Ashford; 51.176°N 0.969°E; TR 076 460	AONB, GCR, NCR, NNR, SAC	Map	Citation	This site has a variety of habitats, including grassland, calacreous fen meadow, scrub, dry woodland on chalk and wet alder woodland. The Devil's Kneading Trough, found within the site, is an important geological site displaying periglacial changes dating to the late glacial period.
Yockletts Bank	Yockletts Bank	✓		25.4 hectares (63 acres)	YES	Canterbury; 51.188°N 1.040°E; TR 125 476	AONB, KWT	Map	Citation	This sloping site has woodland on dry chalk soils with diverse woodland breeding birds. The ground flora, dominated by bluebells, also contains many orchids.

== See also ==
- List of Local Nature Reserves in Kent
- Kent Wildlife Trust

== Sources ==
- Pettit, Paul; White, Mark (2012). The British Palaeolithic: Human Societies at the Edge of the Pleistocene World. Abingdon, UK: Routledge. ISBN 978-0-415-67455-3.
- Ratcliffe, Derek, ed. (1977). A Nature Conservation Review. Vol. 2. Cambridge, UK: Cambridge University Press. ISBN 0-521-21403-3.
