= Tower Hill to Cockham Wood =

Biological and geological site

Coordinates: 51.410°N 0.531°E

- Site of Special Scientific Interest
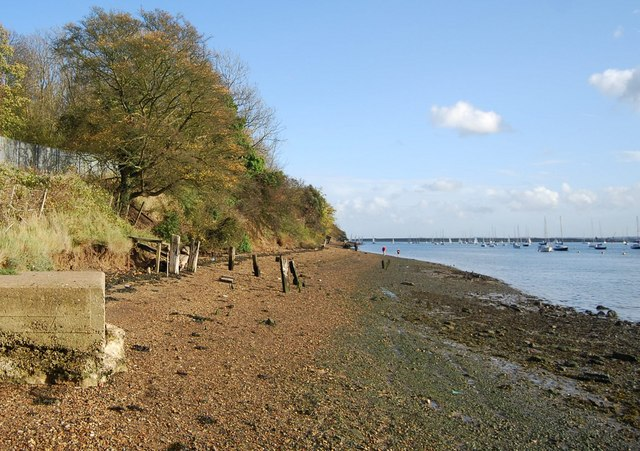
- Location of Tower Hill to Cockham Wood.
- Area of search: Kent
- Grid reference: TQ 761 709
- Interest: Biological; Geological
- Area: 47.8 hectares (118 acres)
- Notification date: 1987
- Location map: Magic Map

Tower Hill to Cockham Wood is a 47.8-hectare (118-acre) biological and geological Site of Special Scientific Interest on the northern outskirts of Rochester in Kent. It contains two Geological Conservation Review sites.

This site contains typical woodland on Tertiary deposits, and sandy areas which have diverse invertebrates, including seven nationally rare bees and wasps. Upnor Quarry exposes a complete sequence of Tertiary rocks.

There are public footpaths through the site, but some parts are private land.
