= Aylesford Pit =

Geological site in Kent, England

Coordinates: 51.3088°N 0.4810°E

- Site of Special Scientific Interest
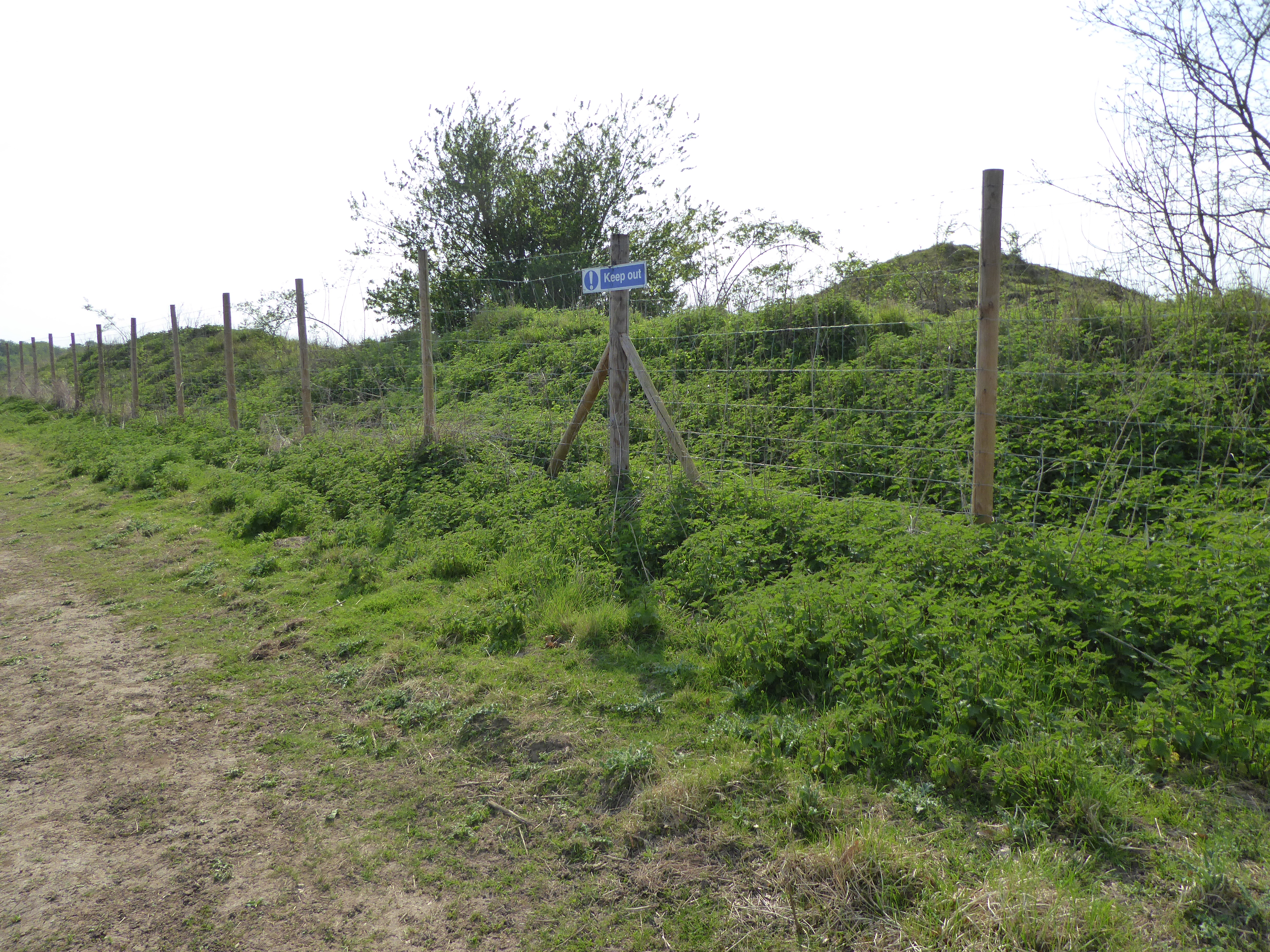
- Location of Aylesford Pit.
- Area of search: Kent
- Grid reference: TQ 730 595
- Interest: Geological
- Area: 1.5 hectares (3.7 acres)
- Notification date: 1991
- Location map: Magic Map

Aylesford Pit is a 1.5-hectare (3.7-acre) geological Site of Special Scientific Interest north of Maidstone in Kent. It is a Geological Conservation Review site.

This Pleistocene site has yielded many mammalian bones and paleolithic artefacts, but its geographical isolation from other sites in the Thames sequence makes its precise correlation uncertain.

The site is private land with no public access.
