= Greatness Brickworks =

Protected area in Kent, England

Coordinates: 51.298°N 0.200°E

- Site of Special Scientific Interest
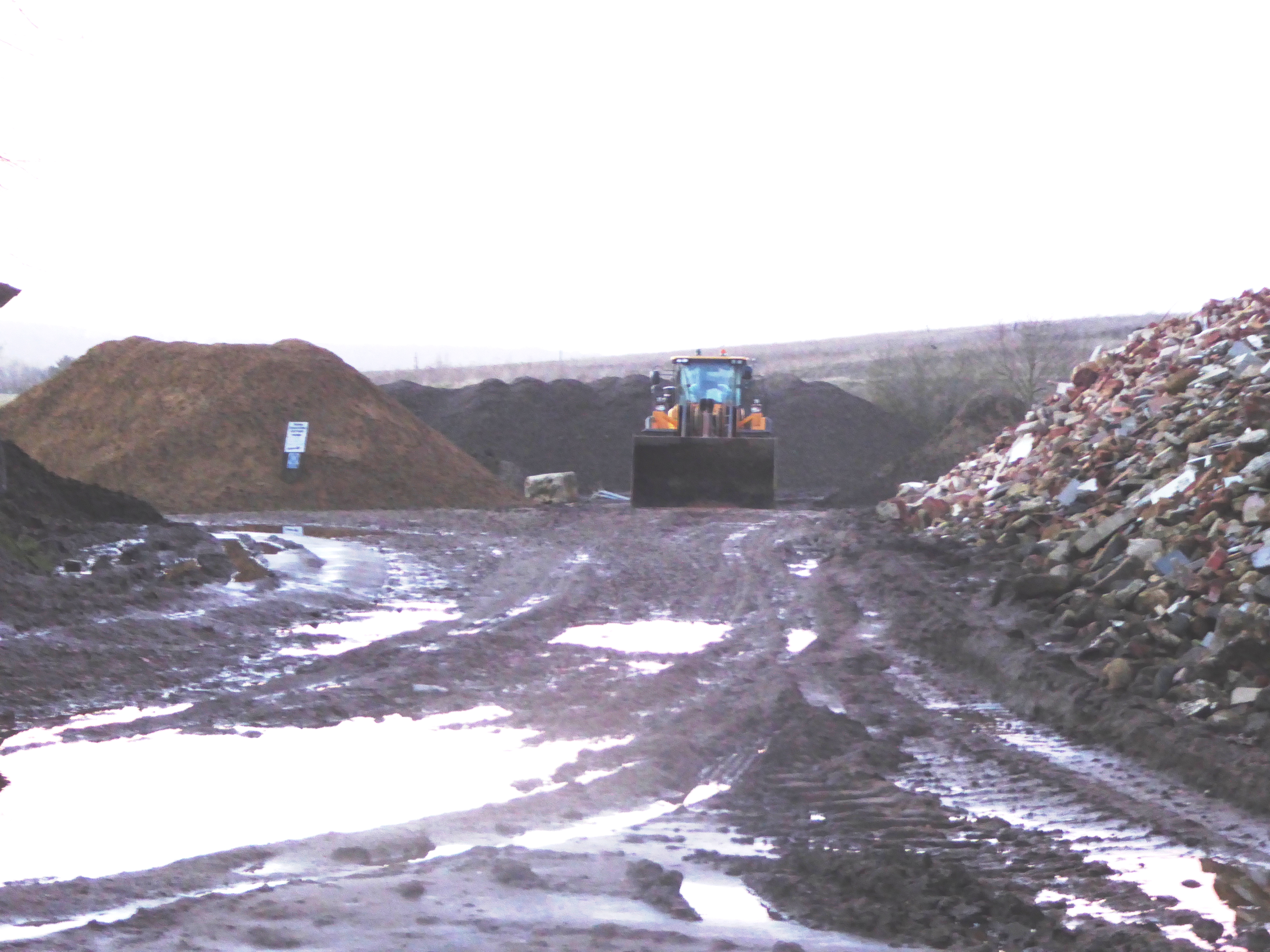
- Location of Greatness Brickworks.
- Area of search: Kent
- Grid reference: TQ 535 577
- Interest: Geological
- Area: 7.8 hectares (19 acres)
- Notification date: 1987
- Location map: Magic Map

Greatness Brickworks is a 7.8-hectare (19-acre) geological Site of Special Scientific Interest in Sevenoaks in Kent. It is a Geological Conservation Review site.

This Cretaceous site is highly fossiliferous, with many ammonites. It is described by Natural England as "of vital importance in biostratigraphic research on the Gault of the Weald".

The site is private land with no public access.
