= Preston Marshes =

Site in east of Canterbury in Kent

Coordinates: 51.297°N 1.202°E

- Site of Special Scientific Interest
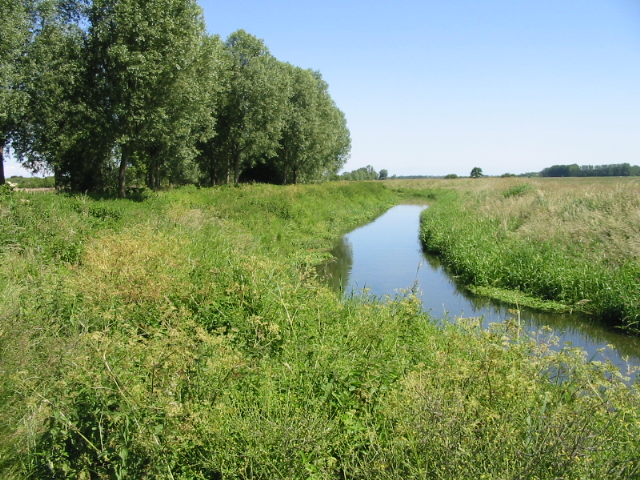
- The Little Stour in Preston Marshes
- Location of Preston Marshes.
- Area of search: Kent
- Grid reference: TR 233 602
- Interest: Biological
- Area: 43.4 hectares (107 acres)
- Notification date: 1984
- Location map: Magic Map

Preston Marshes is a 43.4-hectare (107-acre) biological Site of Special Scientific Interest east of Canterbury in Kent.

This site in the valley of the River Little Stour is dominated by common reed, with areas of willow scrub and pasture. There are many breeding and wintering birds, such as reed buntings and sedge warblers.

A public footpath runs along the eastern boundary.
