= Dryhill Nature Reserve =

Nature reserve

Coordinates: 51.276°N 0.149°E

Dryhill
- Site of Special Scientific Interest
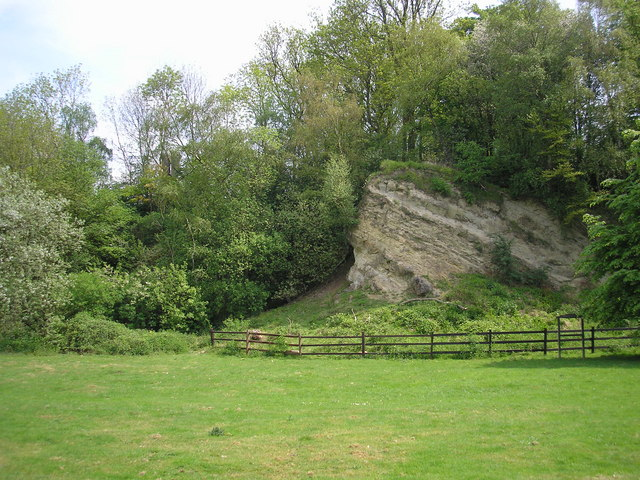
- Location of Dryhill.
- Area of search: Kent
- Grid reference: TQ 500 552
- Interest: Geological
- Area: 11.7 hectares (29 acres)
- Notification date: 1996
- Location map: Magic Map

Dryhill is an 11.7-hectare (29-acre) geological Site of Special Scientific Interest on the western outskirts of Sevenoaks in Kent. It is a Geological Conservation Review site, and an area of 9.5 hectares (23 acres) is a Local Nature Reserve

This former quarry exposes rocks dating to the Aptian stage in the early Cretaceous, around 120 million years ago. It is famous for its rich and diverse brachiopod and bivalve fossils, which are important for palaeoecological research.

There is access from Dryhill Lane.

== Land ownership ==
All land within Dryhill Site of Special Scientific Interest is owned by the local authority.
