= Lynsore Bottom =

Site of Special Scientific Interest in Kent, England

Coordinates: 51.189°N 1.090°E

- Site of Special Scientific Interest
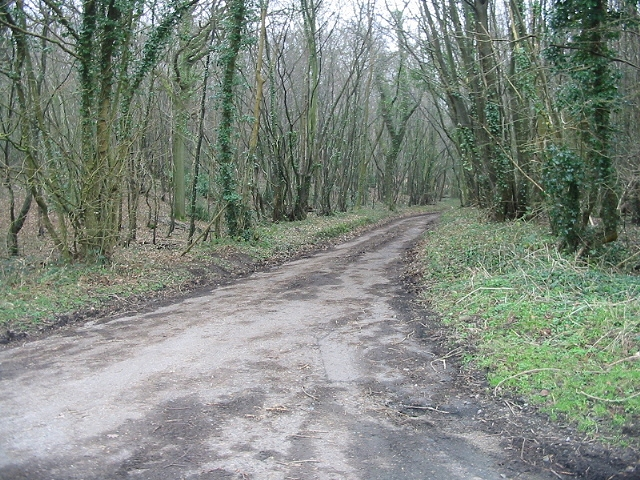
- Location of Lynsore Bottom.
- Area of search: Kent
- Grid reference: TR 160 479
- Interest: Biological
- Area: 70.6 hectares (174 acres)
- Notification date: 1985
- Location map: Magic Map

Lynsore Bottom is a 70.6-hectare (174-acre) biological Site of Special Scientific Interest north of Folkestone in Kent.

These coppice with standards woods have a variety of tree species. The ground flora is diverse, and the woods are also important for their breeding birds, including tawny owls, grasshopper warblers and hawfinches.

The woods are crossed by public footpaths.
