= Farningham Wood =

Natural area in Kent, England

Coordinates: 51.391°N 0.213°E

- Site of Special Scientific Interest
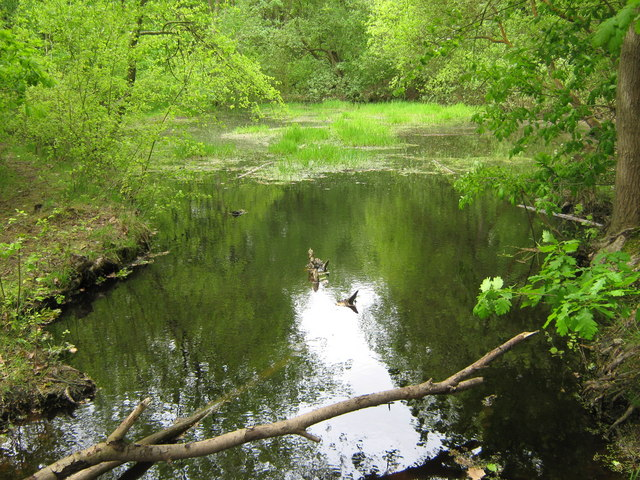
- Location of Farningham Wood.
- Area of search: Kent
- Grid reference: TQ 541 681
- Interest: Biological
- Area: 74.2 hectares (183 acres)
- Notification date: 1986
- Location map: Magic Map

Farningham Wood is a 74.2-hectare (183-acre) biological Site of Special Scientific Interest east of Swanley in Kent. It is also a Local Nature Reserve. It is owned and managed by Sevenoaks District Council and Farningham Parish Council.

This wood has a variety of soil conditions, resulting in diverse ground flora and invertebrates, some of which are typical ancient woodland. Ponds in the middle support several species of amphibian, and the nationally rare hoverfly Volucella inanis has been recorded on the site.

There is access from Calfstock Lane.
