= Combwell Wood =

UK Site of Special Scientific Interest

Coordinates: 51.081°N 0.434°E

- Site of Special Scientific Interest
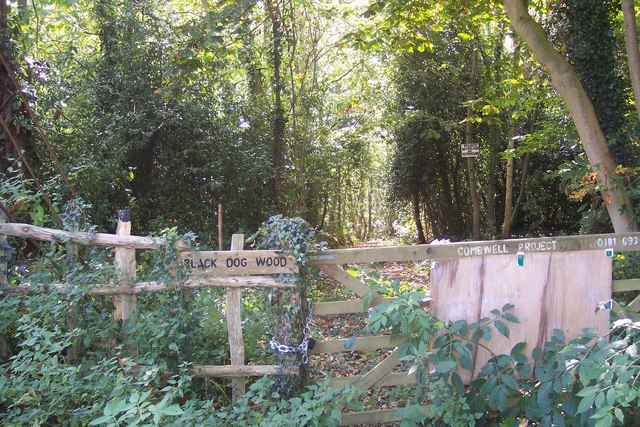
- Location of Combwell Wood.
- Area of search: Kent
- Grid reference: TQ 706 341
- Interest: Biological
- Area: 110.6 hectares (273 acres)
- Notification date: 1991
- Location map: Magic Map

Combwell Wood is a 110.6-hectare (273-acre) biological Site of Special Scientific Interest south-east of Tunbridge Wells in Kent. The wood is part of the High Weald Area of Outstanding Natural Beauty. It is divided into 36 sections owned by different people.

Much of this ancient wood has traditionally been coppiced, but there has probably been undisturbed woodland on steep slopes, and uncommon bryophytes here are thought to be survivors from the Atlantic warm period around 5,000 years ago. There are also several nationally scarce water beetles.

The site is private land, but a public footpath goes through it.
