= Scord's Wood and Brockhoult Mount =

Protected area in Kent, England

Coordinates: 51.248°N 0.112°E

- Site of Special Scientific Interest
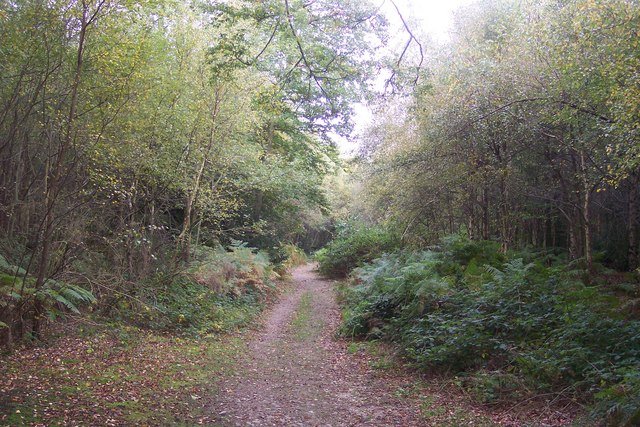
- Bridleway in Scord's Wood
- Location of Scord's Wood and Brockhoult Mount.
- Area of search: Kent
- Grid reference: TQ 475 520
- Interest: Biological
- Area: 252.3 hectares (623 acres)
- Notification date: 1991
- Location map: Magic Map

Scord's Wood and Brockhoult Mount is a 252.3-hectare (623-acre) biological Site of Special Scientific Interest west of Sevenoaks in Kent. Scord's Wood is a Nature Conservation Review site, Grade I.

This sloping site has the best sessile oak stands in the county. Grasslands on acidic soils are mainly common bent, heath bedstraw, and sheep’s sorrel, together with some heather and bracken.

This site is composed of a number of scattered blocks, as well as public footpaths and bridleways that go through some areas.
