= Sissinghurst Park Wood =

Biological site in Kent, England

Coordinates: 51.12°N 0.573°E

- Site of Special Scientific Interest
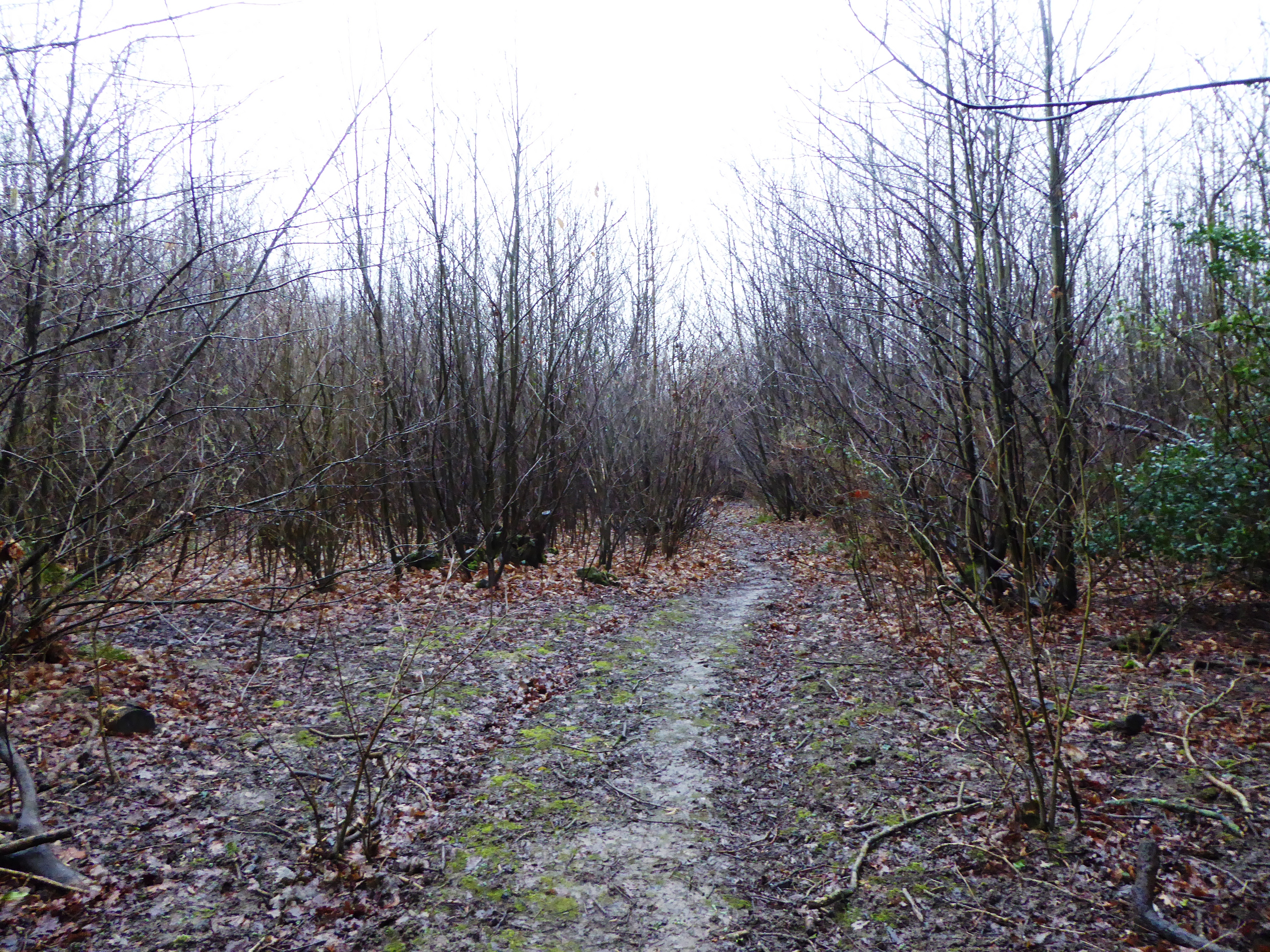
- Location of Sissinghurst Park Wood.
- Area of search: Kent
- Grid reference: TQ 802 388
- Interest: Biological
- Area: 31.1 hectares (77 acres)
- Notification date: 1987
- Location map: Magic Map

Sissinghurst Park Wood is a 31.1-hectare (77-acre) biological Site of Special Scientific Interest north-east of Sissinghurst Kent.

This wood is mainly sweet chestnut coppice, and the importance of the site lies in the number of rare plants found in its rides. It is the most eastern locality in Britain for ivy-leaved bellflower.

The site is private with no public access.
