= Halling to Trottiscliffe Escarpment =

Conservation area in Kent, England

Coordinates: 51.35°N 0.404°E

- Site of Special Scientific Interest
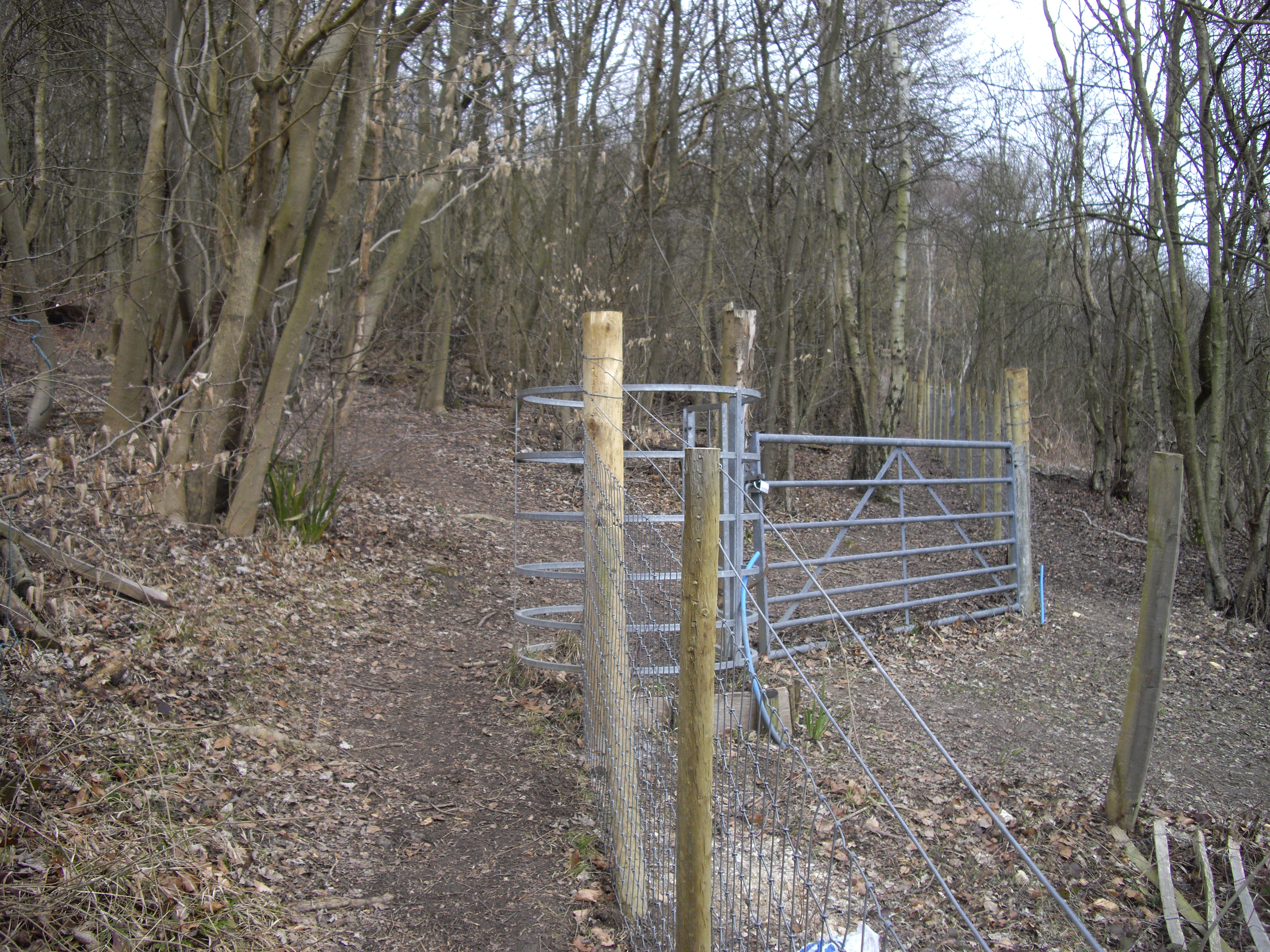
- Location of Halling to Trottiscliffe Escarpment.
- Area of search: Kent
- Grid reference: TQ 675 640
- Interest: Biological
- Area: 600.6 hectares (1,484 acres)
- Notification date: 1984
- Location map: Magic Map

Halling to Trottiscliffe Escarpment is a 600.6-hectare (1,484-acre) biological Site of Special Scientific Interest which runs from Cuxton to Wrotham, west of Rochester in Kent. It is a Nature Conservation Review site, Grade I. and a Special Area of Conservation.

This site on the North Downs has grassland and beech woodland on chalk soil. It is entomologically important, with uncommon insects such as the bug Psylla viburni, and it is the only known location in Britain for the moth Hypercallia citrinalis.
