= Ileden and Oxenden Woods =

Woodland in Kent, England

Coordinates: 51.228°N 1.175°E

- Site of Special Scientific Interest
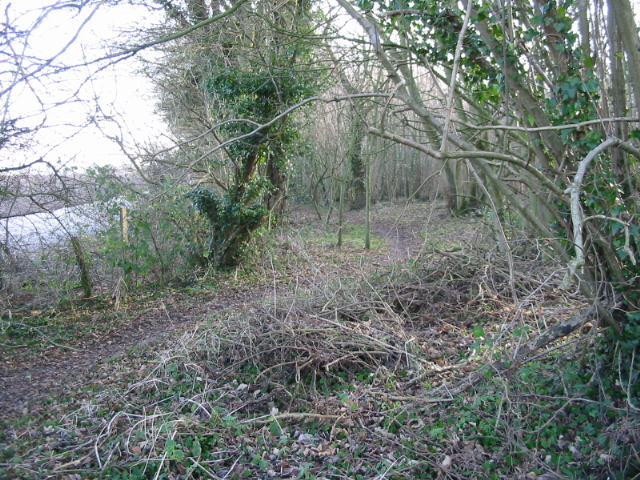
- Location of Ileden and Oxenden Woods.
- Area of search: Kent
- Grid reference: TR 218 524
- Interest: Biological
- Area: 86.4 hectares (213 acres)
- Notification date: 1986
- Location map: Magic Map

Ileden and Oxenden Woods is an 86.4-hectare (213-acre) biological Site of Special Scientific Interest (SSSI) south-east of Canterbury in Kent. It is in the Kent Downs Area of Outstanding Natural Beauty and is located in Adisham parish.

The SSSI incorporates six named woods. From north to south, these are Oxenden Wood, Pitt Wood, Woodlands Wood, Boughtonland Wood, Well Wood and Ileden Wood.

These woods have a variety of soil types and diverse habitats. There is a rich bird community and ground flora, including two nationally rare orchids, narrow-lipped helleborine and lady orchid.

Public footpaths go through the woods.

== Controversy ==
Ileden and Oxenden Woods has been the subject of significant local dispute in recent years over public access, ownership and management.

In 2010, Adisham residents protested when Timothy Steel, a local landowner and former banker to the Queen, attempted to prevent walkers from accessing paths in the woods. After Kent County Council issued an order to maintain public access, which was appealed by Mr. Steel, a public inquiry followed. The inquiry ruled in favour of the villagers, confirming the status of the paths as public rights of way.

In 2019, local residents raised concerns about the ownership and management of the woodland after Woodlands.co.uk acquired land in Pitt and Oxenden Woods. A public meeting was held in September 2019 to discuss the possible impact of Woodlands.co.uk's practices of woodland lotting, which involves selling woodland in small chunks. A recommendation was made during the meeting to retain management of the woodland as a whole. Additionally, the company had submitted plans to widen and resurface the woodland paths with aggregate; however, these plans were later abandoned.

In 2021, Oxenden and Pitt Wood were sold without being subdivided. Following the sale, a local group of volunteers called Watch Over Adisham's Woods has since been working with the new owners of all woods in the Ileden and Oxenden SSSI, discussing management plans, sharing information about flora and fauna and collectively resolving issues that arise.
