= Hubbard's Hill =

Geological site of interest in Kent, England

Coordinates: 51.247°N 0.196°E

- Site of Special Scientific Interest
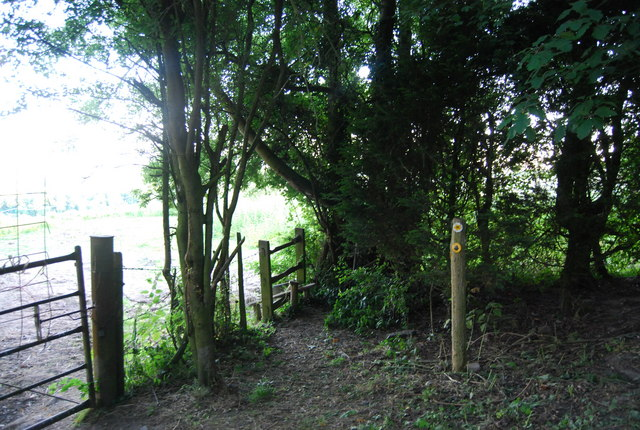
- Location of Hubbard's Hill.
- Area of search: Kent
- Grid reference: TQ 534 520
- Interest: Geological
- Area: 66.6 hectares (165 acres)
- Notification date: 1986
- Location map: Magic Map

Hubbard's Hill is a 66.6-hectare (165-acre) geological Site of Special Scientific Interest south of Sevenoaks in Kent. It is a Geological Conservation Review site.

This Quaternary site exhibits solifluction (erosion by freezing and thawing). The main deposits date to the Wolstonian glaciation around 130,000 years ago, but the latest have radiocarbon dates of only 12,500 years, during the most recent Younger Dryas ice age.

The Greensand Way long distance footpath goes through the site.
