= Polebrook Farm =

Protected area in Kent, England

Coordinates: 51.208°N 0.155°E

- Site of Special Scientific Interest
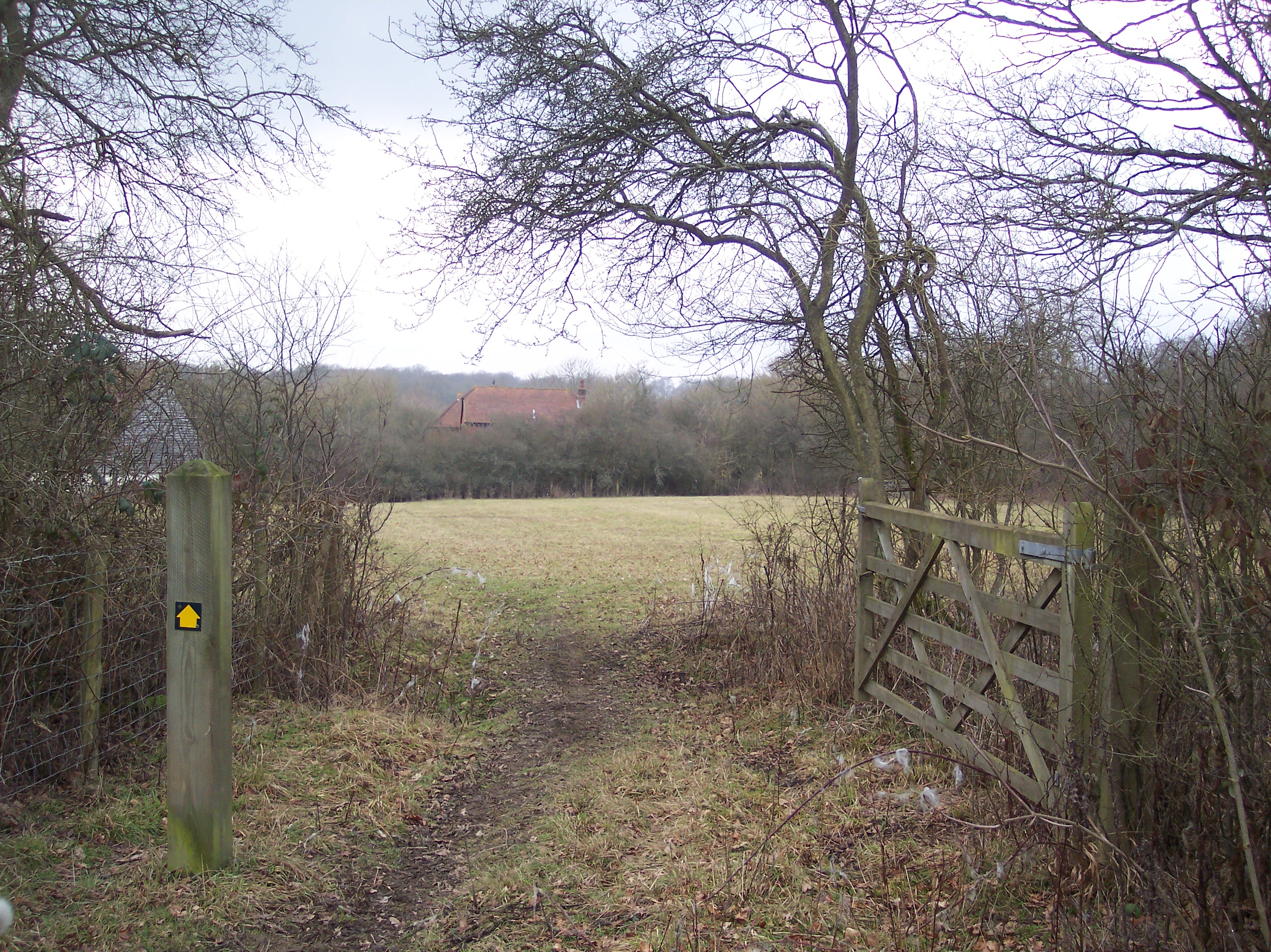
- Location of Polebrook Farm.
- Area of search: Kent
- Grid reference: TQ 506 476
- Interest: Biological
- Area: 13.0 hectares (32 acres)
- Notification date: 1984
- Location map: Magic Map

Polebrook Farm is a 13-hectare (32-acre) biological Site of Special Scientific Interest south of Sevenoaks in Kent, England.

The field layout of this farm is believed to have remained unchanged for over 700 years. The hedges and meadows have a rich variety of flora, with at least 19 species of grasses.

A public footpath crosses the site.
