= Wateringbury SSSI =

Protected area in Kent, England

Coordinates: 51.255°N 0.416°E

Wateringbury
- Site of Special Scientific Interest
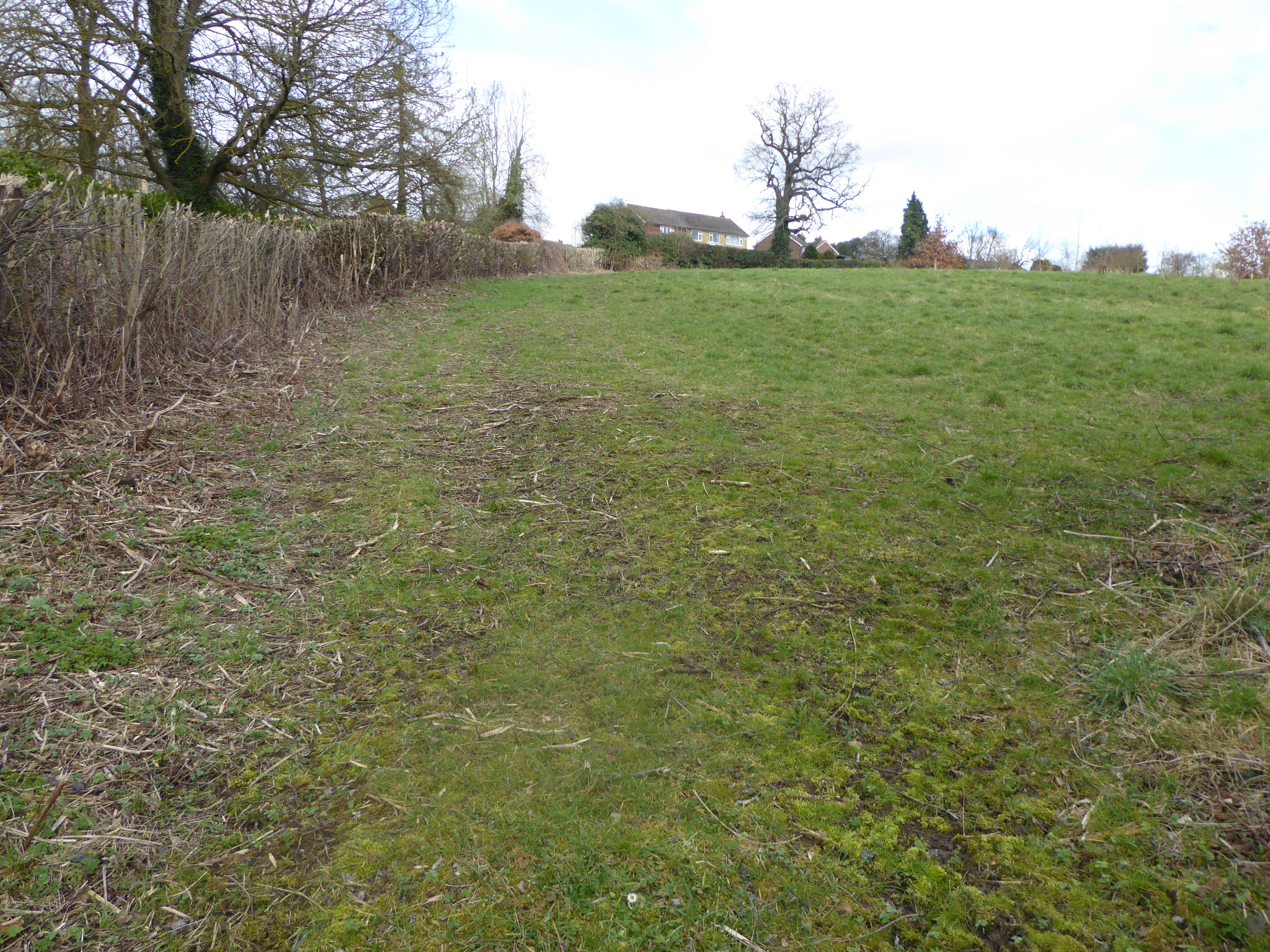
- Location of Wateringbury.
- Area of search: Kent
- Grid reference: TQ 687 534
- Interest: Geological
- Area: 0.2 hectares (0.49 acres)
- Notification date: 1996
- Location map: Magic Map

Wateringbury SSSI is a 0.2-hectare (0.49-acre) geological Site of Special Scientific Interest in Wateringbury west of Maidstone in Kent. It is a Geological Conservation Review site.

This site contains tufa which displays a complete sequence of molluscs, especially terrestrial snails, dating to the early Holocene, and thus gives a full record of the order in which species colonised the area after the end of the last ice age, the Younger Dryas.

The site is private land with no public access. It has been filled in and no geology is visible.
