= Down Bank =

Conservation area in Kent, England

Coordinates: 51.23°N 0.982°E

- Site of Special Scientific Interest
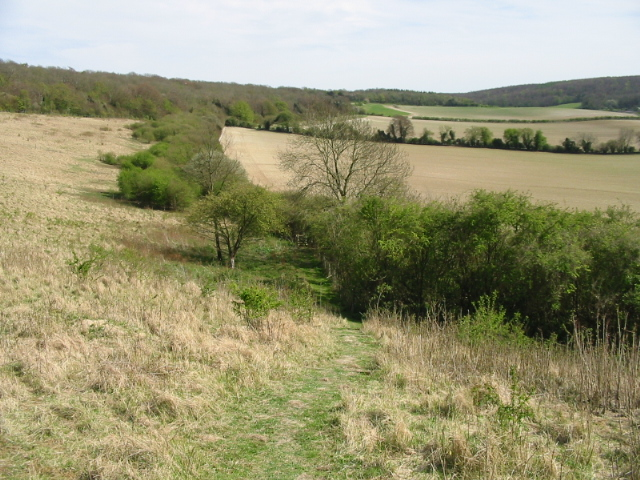
- Location of Down Bank.
- Area of search: Kent
- Grid reference: TR 083 521
- Interest: Biological
- Area: 5.9 hectares (15 acres)
- Notification date: 1990
- Location map: Magic Map

Down Bank is a 5.9-hectare (15-acre) biological Site of Special Scientific Interest south-west of Canterbury in Kent.

This sloping chalk meadow has the nationally endangered black-veined moth and twenty-eight species of butterfly, including the nationally scarce Duke of Burgundy. Grassland flora include two nationally scarce species, small bedstraw and man orchid.

A public footpath goes through the site.
