= Oaken Wood =

Woodland in Kent, England

Coordinates: 51.267°N 0.437°E

- Site of Special Scientific Interest
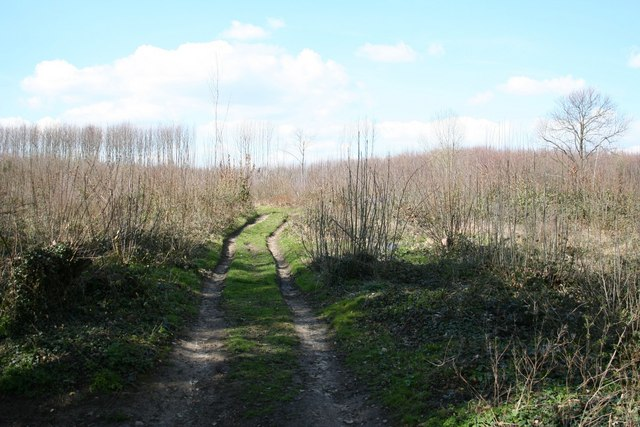
- Location of Oaken Wood.
- Area of search: Kent
- Grid reference: TQ 701 548
- Interest: Geological
- Area: 18.7 hectares (46 acres)
- Notification date: 1985
- Location map: Magic Map

Oaken Wood is a 18.7-hectare (46-acre) geological Site of Special Scientific Interest west of Maidstone in Kent. It is a Geological Conservation Review site.

Known locally as "Barming Wood" due to the village of Barming being the closest settlement to Oaken Woods, it is an ancient woodland with orchids, dormice, tawny owls, nightingales and many species of bat (alongside various other species).

This site provides the best example of a very unusual topography, with cracking and tilting of underlying weaker strata during the Pleistocene by periglacial processes producing crests and troughs in the surface rocks.

A public footpath crosses the site.

In 2013, plans to uproot parts or all of Oaken Wood for a ragstone quarry were met with controversy due to its environmental importance (with various different species residing there) and its possibility in setting a legal precedent for up to 300 other ancient woodlands in the UK.

The most current threat Oaken Wood faces is the proposed expansion of Hermitage Quarry (Gallagher Aggregates Ltd). Along with the 32 hectares lost by a previous expansion in 2013, “The loss of ancient woodland … could be greater than the losses from HS2 and the Lower Thames Crossing combined". (The Woodland Trust).
