= Magpie Bottom =

Protected area in Kent, England

Coordinates: 51.329°N 0.216°E

- Site of Special Scientific Interest
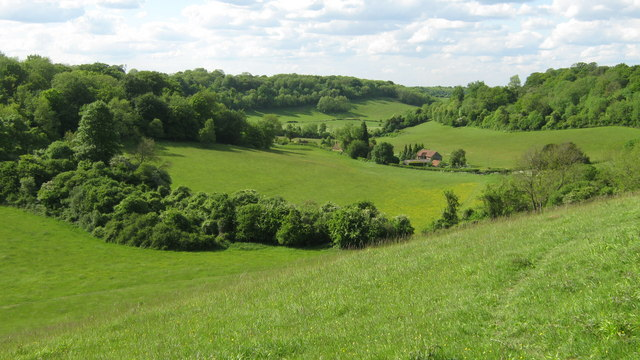
- Location of Magpie Bottom.
- Area of search: Kent
- Grid reference: TQ 545 612
- Interest: Biological
- Area: 51.9 hectares (128 acres)
- Notification date: 1987
- Location map: Magic Map

Magpie Bottom is a 51.9-hectare (128-acre) biological Site of Special Scientific Interest north of Sevenoaks in Kent.

This steeply sloping area of chalk grassland has diverse herb flora, including the nationally rare Kentish milkwort and seven species of orchid, such as the scarce man orchid. There are also areas of woodland and scrub.

Public footpaths go through the site.
