= Otterpool Quarry =

Site of Special Scientific Interest in Kent, England

Coordinates: 51.088°N 1.014°E

- Site of Special Scientific Interest
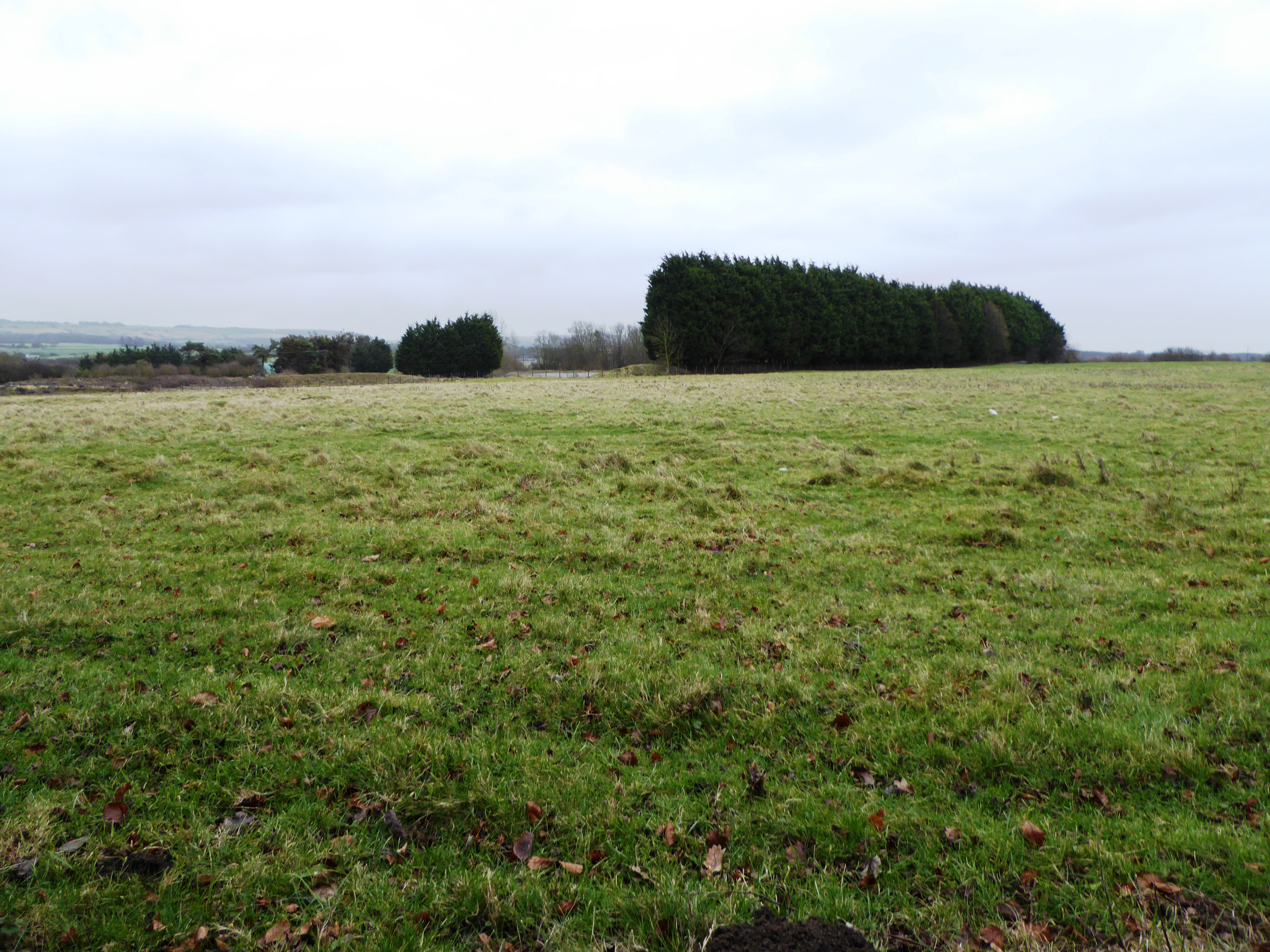
- Location of Otterpool Quarry.
- Area of search: Kent
- Grid reference: TR 112 364
- Interest: Geological
- Area: 10.2 hectares (25 acres)
- Notification date: 1984
- Location map: Magic Map

Otterpool Quarry is a 10.2-hectare (25-acre) geological Site of Special Scientific Interest west of Hythe in Kent. It is a Geological Conservation Review site.

This quarry exposes rocks dating to the Cretaceous period, and shows the contact between the Hythe and Sandgate beds. It is very rich in fossil ammonites, with species which can be correlated elsewhere.

The site is private land with no public access. The quarry has been filled in and no geology is visible.
