= Lenham Quarry =

Site of Special Scientific Interest in Kent, England

Coordinates: 51.240°N 0.741°E

- Site of Special Scientific Interest
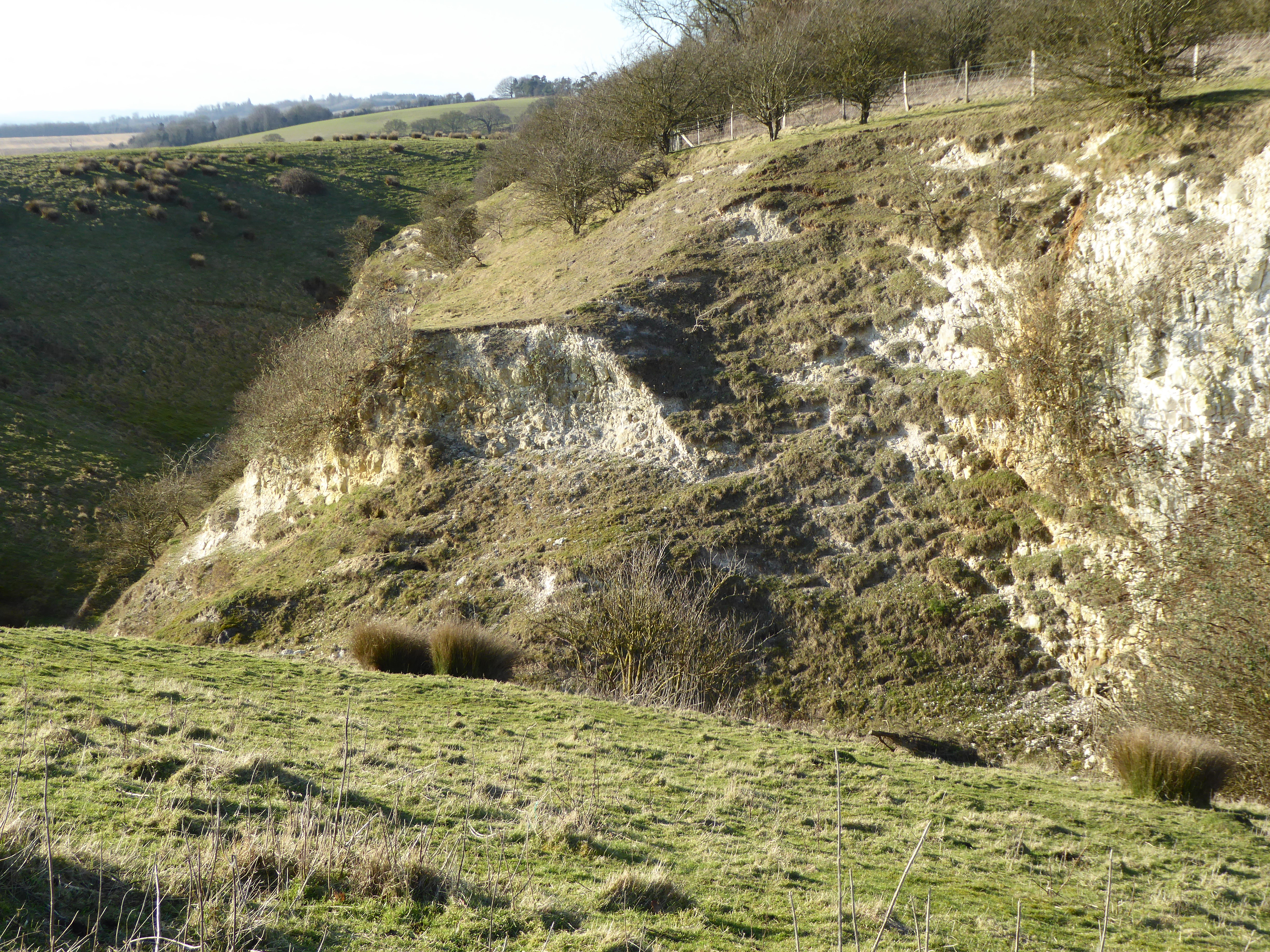
- Location of Lenham Quarry.
- Area of search: Kent
- Grid reference: TQ 914 525
- Interest: Geological
- Area: 4.0 hectares (9.9 acres)
- Notification date: 1987
- Location map: Magic Map

Lenham Quarry is a 4-hectare (9.9-acre) geological Site of Special Scientific Interest east of Lenham in Kent. It is a Geological Conservation Review site.

This site has been assigned to the Pliocene on the basis of its gastropod, bivalve and serpulid worm fossils. It is important because there are few exposures dating from this period in Britain.

There is access to the site from Hubbards Hill.
