= Gibbin's Brook =

UK Site of Special Scientific Interest

Coordinates: 51.107°N 1.021°E

- Site of Special Scientific Interest
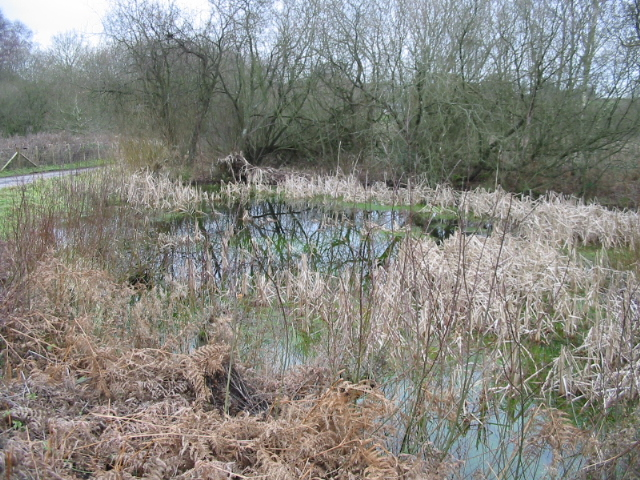
- Location of Gibbin's Brook.
- Area of search: Kent
- Grid reference: TR 116 385
- Interest: Biological
- Area: 16.8 hectares (42 acres)
- Notification date: 1985
- Location map: Magic Map

Gibbin's Brook is a 16.8-hectare (42-acre) biological Site of Special Scientific Interest in Sellindge in Kent.

This site is mainly marshy grassland, but it also has a stream, a pond and small areas of bog and dry acidic grassland. It is notable for its invertebrates, especially moths.

The site is open to the public and a footpath runs through it.
