= Southborough Pit =

Protected area in Kent, England

Coordinates: 51.153°N 0.276°E

- Site of Special Scientific Interest
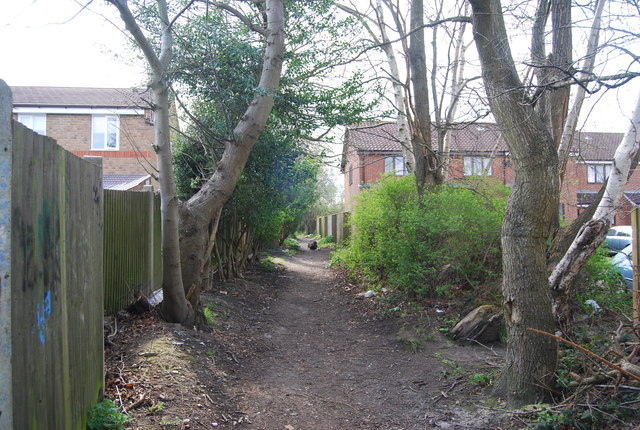
- Location of Southborough Pit.
- Area of search: Kent
- Grid reference: TQ 593 418
- Interest: Geological
- Area: 1.1 hectares (2.7 acres)
- Notification date: 1993
- Location map: Magic Map

Southborough Pit is a 1.1-hectare (2.7-acre) geological Site of Special Scientific Interest in Tunbridge Wells in Kent. It is a Geological Conservation Review site.

This site dates to the Valanginian age, around 140 million years ago in the Lower Cretaceous. It is the type locality for the High Brooms Soil Bed, which contains the aquatic horsetail Equisetes lyellii.

Footpaths go through the site, but it has been filled in and no geology is visible.
