= Brookland Wood =

Uk Site of Special Scientific Interest

Coordinates: 51.124°N 0.371°E

- Site of Special Scientific Interest
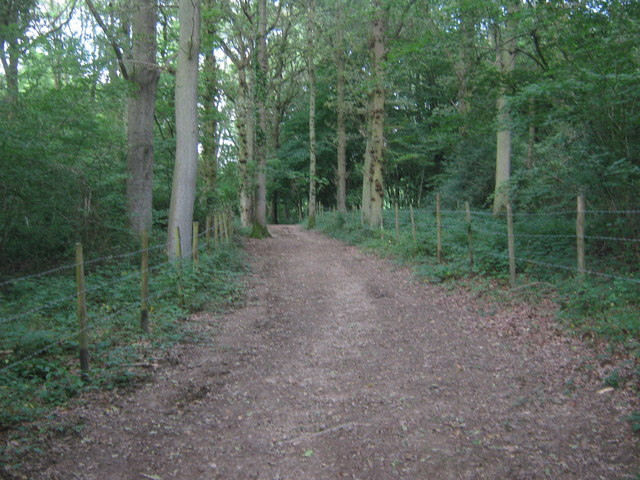
- Location of Brookland Wood.
- Area of search: Kent
- Grid reference: TQ 660 387
- Interest: Biological
- Area: 10.9 hectares (27 acres)
- Notification date: 1986
- Location map: Magic Map

Brookland Wood is a 10.9-hectare (27-acre) biological Site of Special Scientific Interest east of Tunbridge Wells in Kent.

This site has diverse types of woodland and ground flora. Alder is dominant in wet areas and hazel, ash and field maple in drier ones. Small streams have a variety of mosses and liverworts.

A public footpath goes through the wood.
