= Houlder and Monarch Hill Pits, Upper Halling =

Protected area in Kent, England

Coordinates: 51.345°N 0.425°E

- Site of Special Scientific Interest
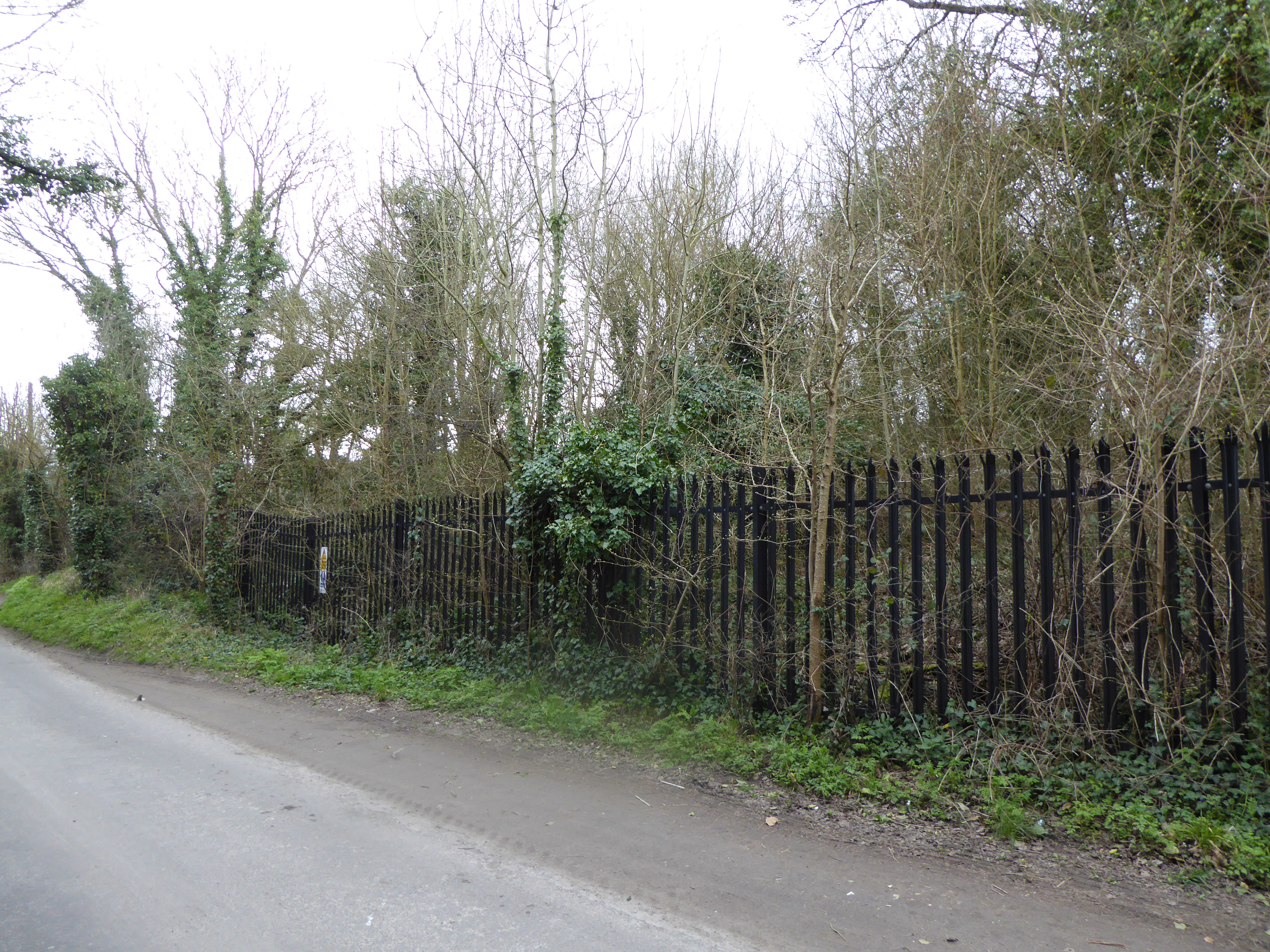
- Location of Houlder and Monarch Hill Pits, Upper Halling.
- Area of search: Kent, England
- Grid reference: TQ 690 634
- Interest: Geological
- Area: 0.7 hectares (1.7 acres)
- Notification date: 1990
- Location map: Magic Map

Houlder and Monarch Hill Pits is a 0.7-hectare (1.7-acre) geological Site of Special Scientific Interest in Upper Halling in Kent, England. It is a Geological Conservation Review site.

This site has a sequence of deposits covering the end of the Last glacial period, with two sheets of glacial deposits separated by a fossil soil assigned to the late glacial interstadial around 13,000 years ago. It provides evidence of lithostratigraphic and biostratigraphic changes during this period.

The quarries are private land with no public access.
