= Cowden Meadow =

Protected area in Kent, England

Coordinates: 51.153°N 0.115°E

- Site of Special Scientific Interest
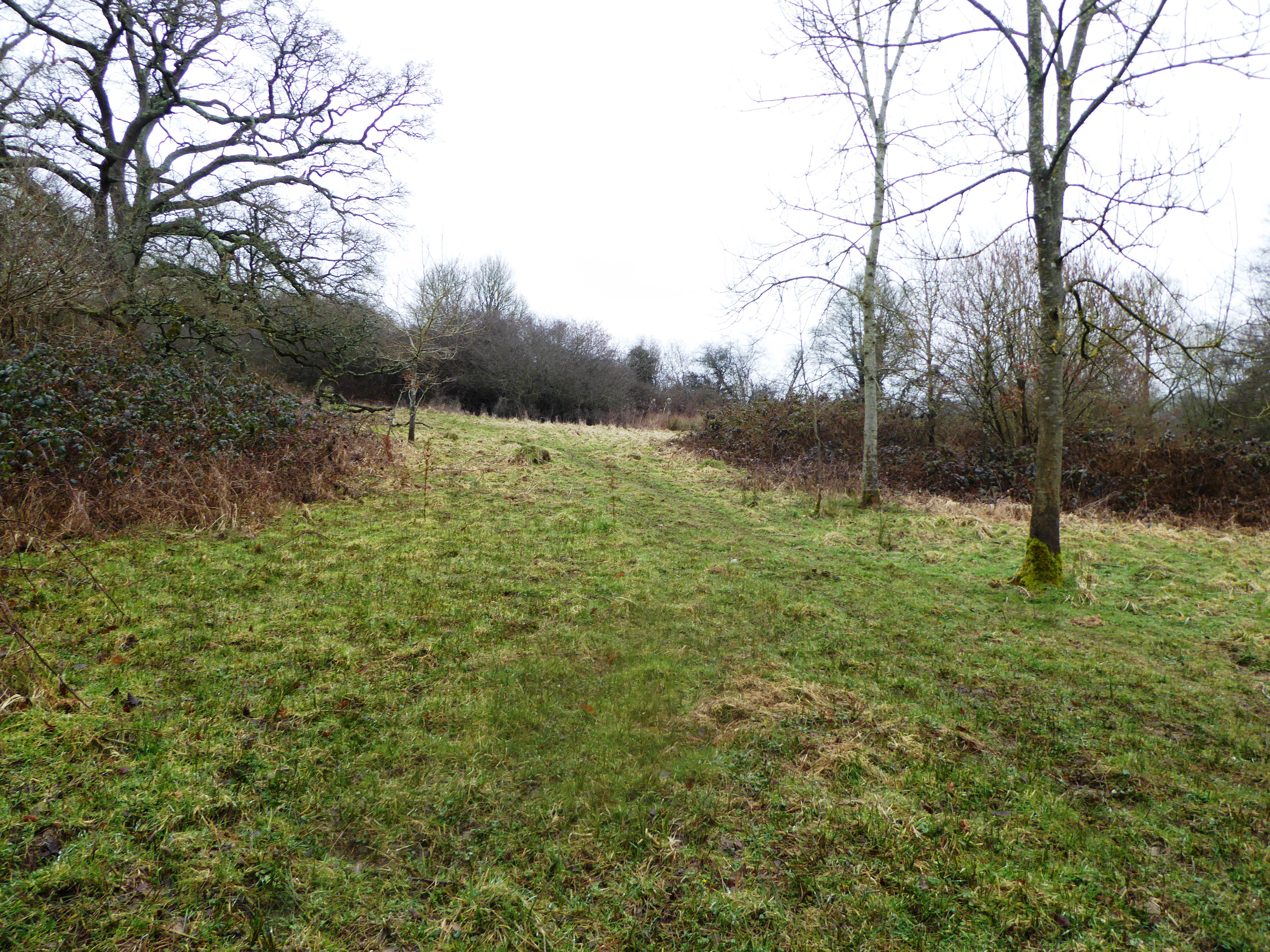
- Location of Cowden Meadow.
- Area of search: Kent
- Grid reference: TQ 480 414
- Interest: Biological
- Area: 1.1 hectares (2.7 acres)
- Notification date: 1984
- Location map: Magic Map

Cowden Meadow is a 1.1-hectare (2.7-acre) biological Site of Special Scientific Interest east of Cowden in Kent.

This site has flora which are found on grassland sites which have not been cultivated for many years, such as quaking grass, oxeye daisy and pepper saxifrage. Wetter areas are dominated by hard rush.

A public footpath runs along the southern end of the site.
