= Pembury Cutting and Pit =

Protected area in Kent, England

Coordinates: 51.149°N 0.303°E

- Site of Special Scientific Interest
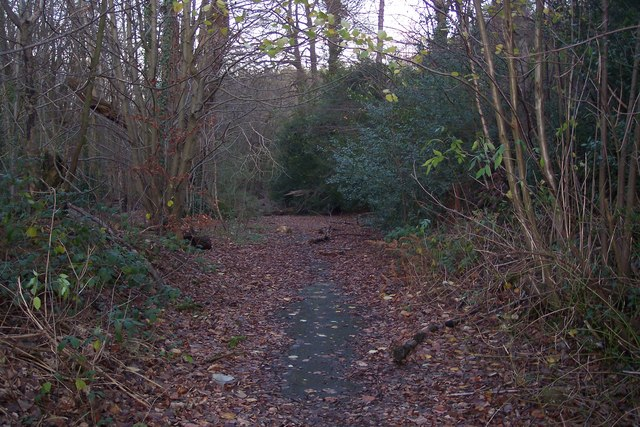
- Location of Pembury Cutting and Pit.
- Area of search: Kent
- Grid reference: TQ 612 414
- Interest: Geological
- Area: 1.6 hectares (4.0 acres)
- Notification date: 1989
- Location map: Magic Map

Pembury Cutting and Pit is a 1.6-hectare (4.0-acre) geological Site of Special Scientific Interest east of Tunbridge Wells in Kent. It is a Geological Conservation Review site.

This site exposes rocks of the Tunbridge Wells Sand Formation, dating to the Early Cretaceous around 140 to 100 million years ago. There are many fossils of Lycopodites, an extinct plant.

This site is in three separate areas, and a lane and a footpath run along the side of two of them.
