= Robins Wood =

Woodland in Kent, England

Coordinates: 51.076°N 0.522°E

- Site of Special Scientific Interest
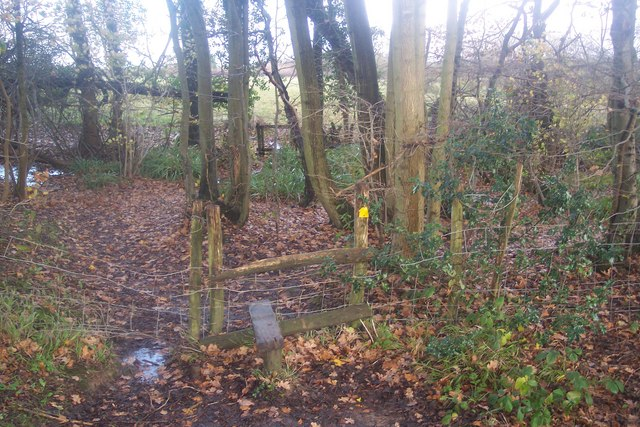
- Location of Robins Wood.
- Area of search: Kent
- Grid reference: TQ 768 338
- Interest: Biological
- Area: 47.7 hectares (118 acres)
- Notification date: 1987
- Location map: Magic Map

Robins Wood is a 47.7-hectare (118-acre) biological Site of Special Scientific Interest between Tunbridge Wells and Ashford in Kent, England.

This is a deep valley along a stream in the Weald, and has the humid conditions typical of such areas. It has a diverse flora of mosses, ferns and liverworts, and woodland which is thought to date back to recolonisation after the last ice age ended 11,700 years ago.

Footpaths go through some parts of the site.
