= Bourne Alder Carr =

Protected area in Kent, England

Coordinates: 51.271°N 0.301°E

- Site of Special Scientific Interest
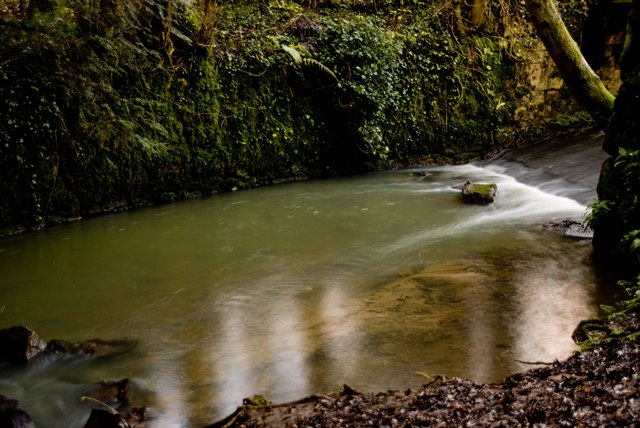
- The River Bourne
- Location of Bourne Alder Carr.
- Area of search: Kent
- Grid reference: TQ 606 549
- Interest: Biological
- Area: 13.4 hectares (33 acres)
- Notification date: 1987
- Location map: Magic Map

Bourne Alder Carr is a 13.4-hectare (33-acre) biological Site of Special Scientific Interest east of Sevenoaks in Kent.

The River Bourne runs through a shallow valley, and frequent flushing of the woodland on the banks with water rich in nutrients creates a rich ground flora. There is also an area of swamp around a fish pond.

Roads and footpaths go through this site.
