= Westerham Wood =

Protected area in Kent, England

Coordinates: 51.276°N 0.062°E

- Site of Special Scientific Interest
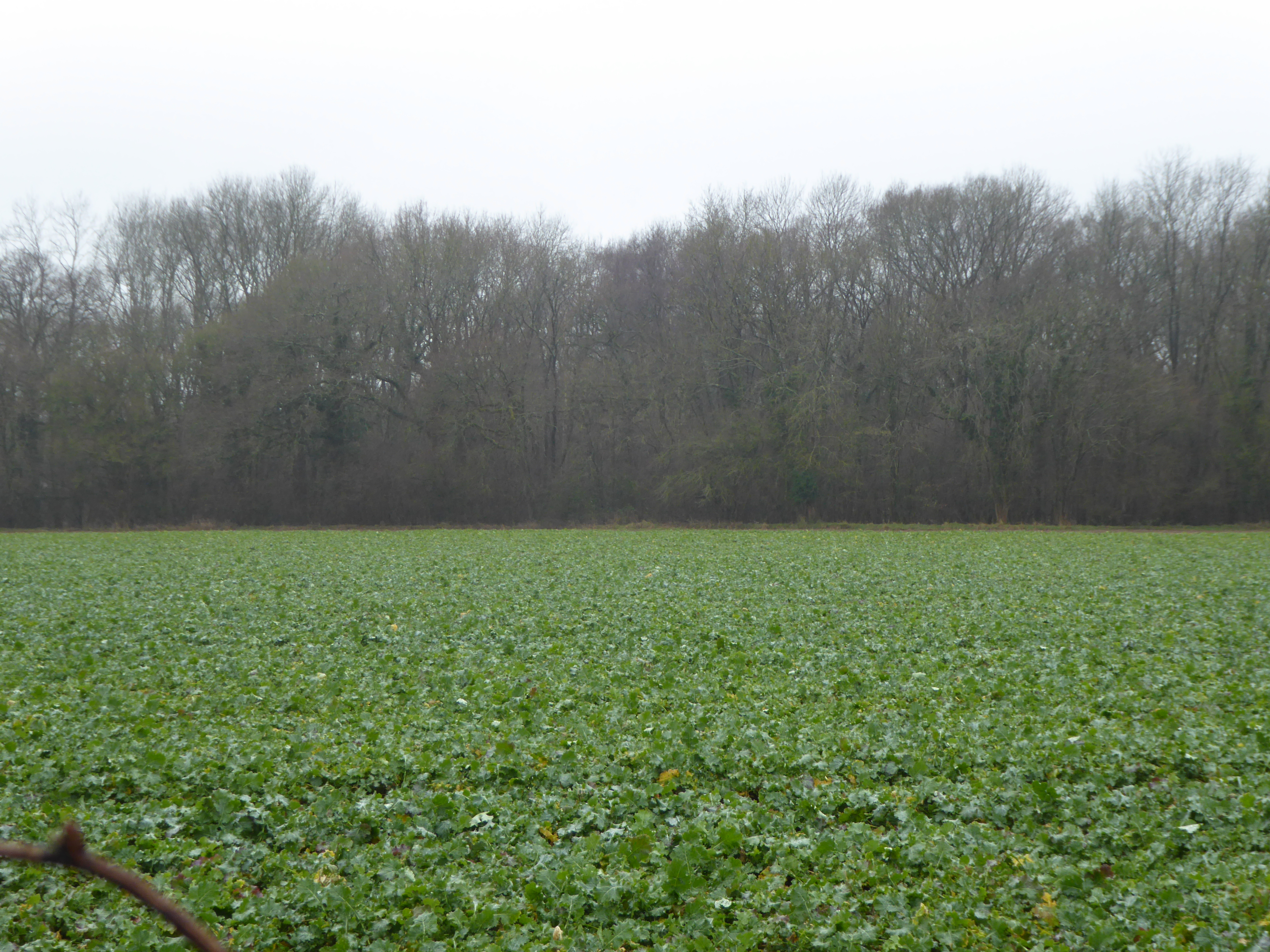
- Location of Westerham Wood.
- Area of search: Kent
- Grid reference: TQ 439 550
- Interest: Biological
- Area: 43.2 hectares (107 acres)
- Notification date: 1986
- Location map: Magic Map

Westerham Wood is a 43.2 hectares (107 acres) biological Site of Special Scientific Interest north of Westerham in Kent.

This ancient oak wood on Gault Clay is traditionally managed, and it has a diverse ground flora and an outstanding range of breeding birds. The insect fauna is also diverse, and 77 bryophyte and nearly 300 fungus species have been recorded.

The site is private land with no public access.
