= Alex Farm Pastures =

Protected area in Kent, England

Coordinates: 51.097°N 0.806°E

- Site of Special Scientific Interest
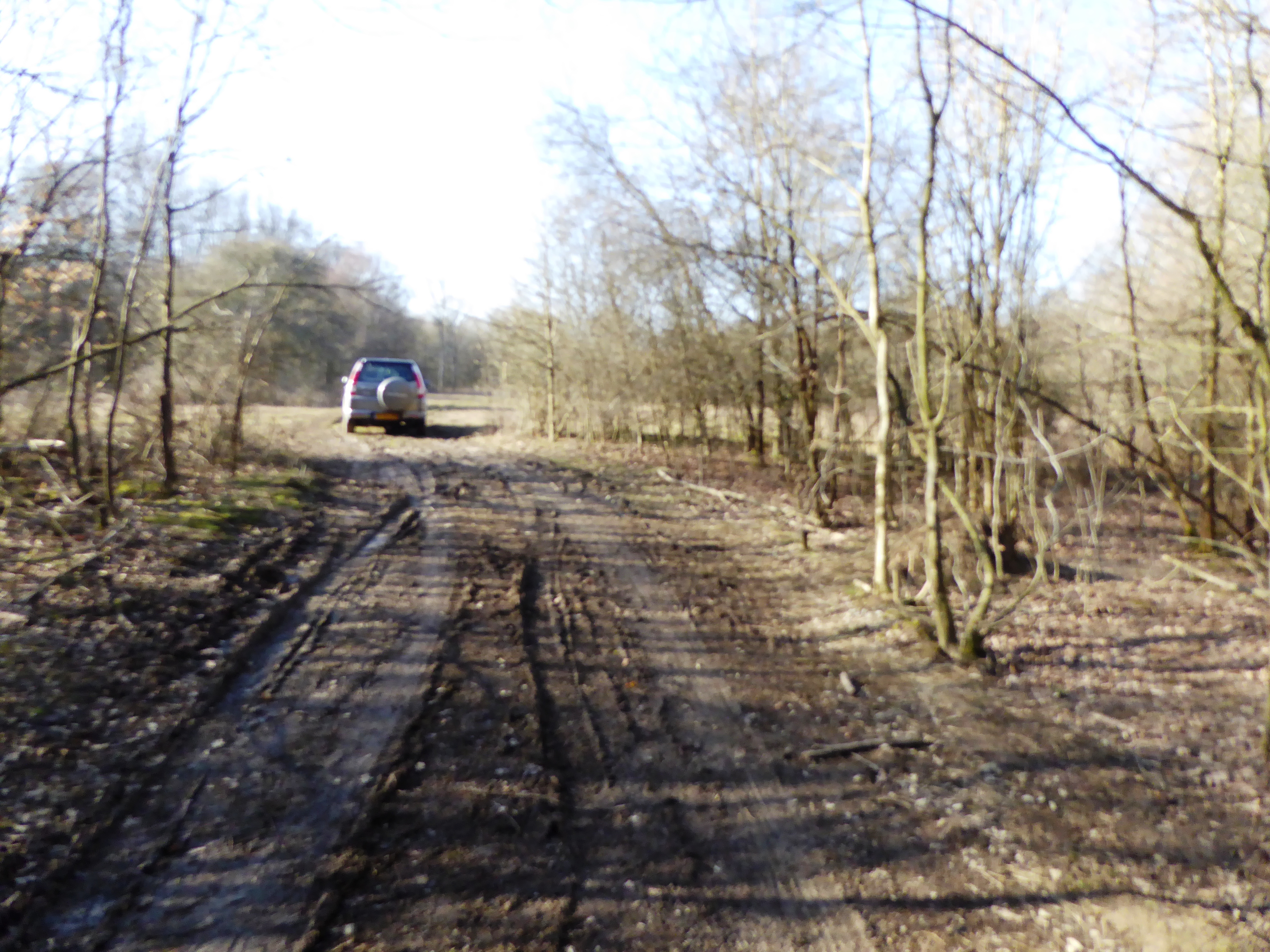
- Location of Alex Farm Pastures.
- Area of search: Kent
- Grid reference: TQ 966 368
- Interest: Biological
- Area: 4.5 hectares (11 acres)
- Notification date: 1994
- Location map: Magic Map

Alex Farm Pastures is a 4.5-hectare (11-acre) biological Site of Special Scientific Interest south of Shadoxhurst in Kent.

This site has unimproved neutral grassland, which is a nationally rare habitat. Some of it has been lost to scrub, but in other areas it is maintained by rabbit grazing. There are several uncommon butterflies, including the nationally scarce pearl-bordered fritillary and small pearl-bordered fritillary.

The site is private land with no public access.
