= Charing Beech Hangers =

Site of Special Scientific Interest in Kent, England

Coordinates: 51.201°N 0.831°E

- Site of Special Scientific Interest
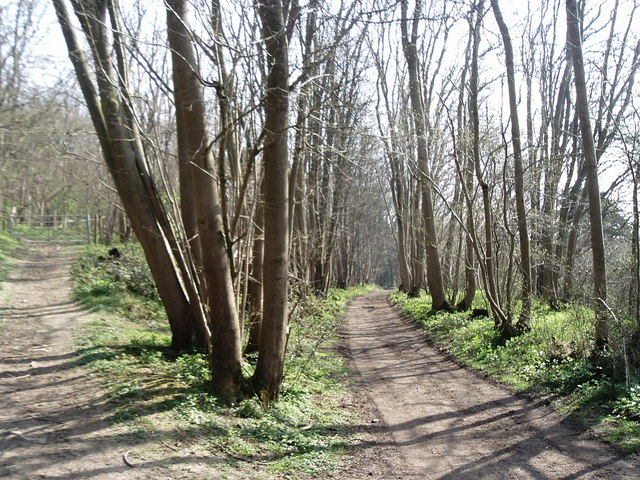
- Location of Charing Beech Hangers.
- Area of search: Kent
- Grid reference: TQ 979 484
- Interest: Biological
- Area: 52.6 hectares (130 acres)
- Notification date: 1986
- Location map: Magic Map

Charing Beech Hangers is a 52.6-hectare (130-acre) biological Site of Special Scientific Interest north of Ashford in Kent.

This steeply sloping site has mature beech and oak, and the ground flora is varied with some uncommon species. Invertebrates include the rare slug limax tenellus and several scarce moths.

The North Downs Way runs along the south side of the site.
