= Sturry Pit =

Protected area in Kent, England

Coordinates: 51.304°N 1.12°E

- Site of Special Scientific Interest
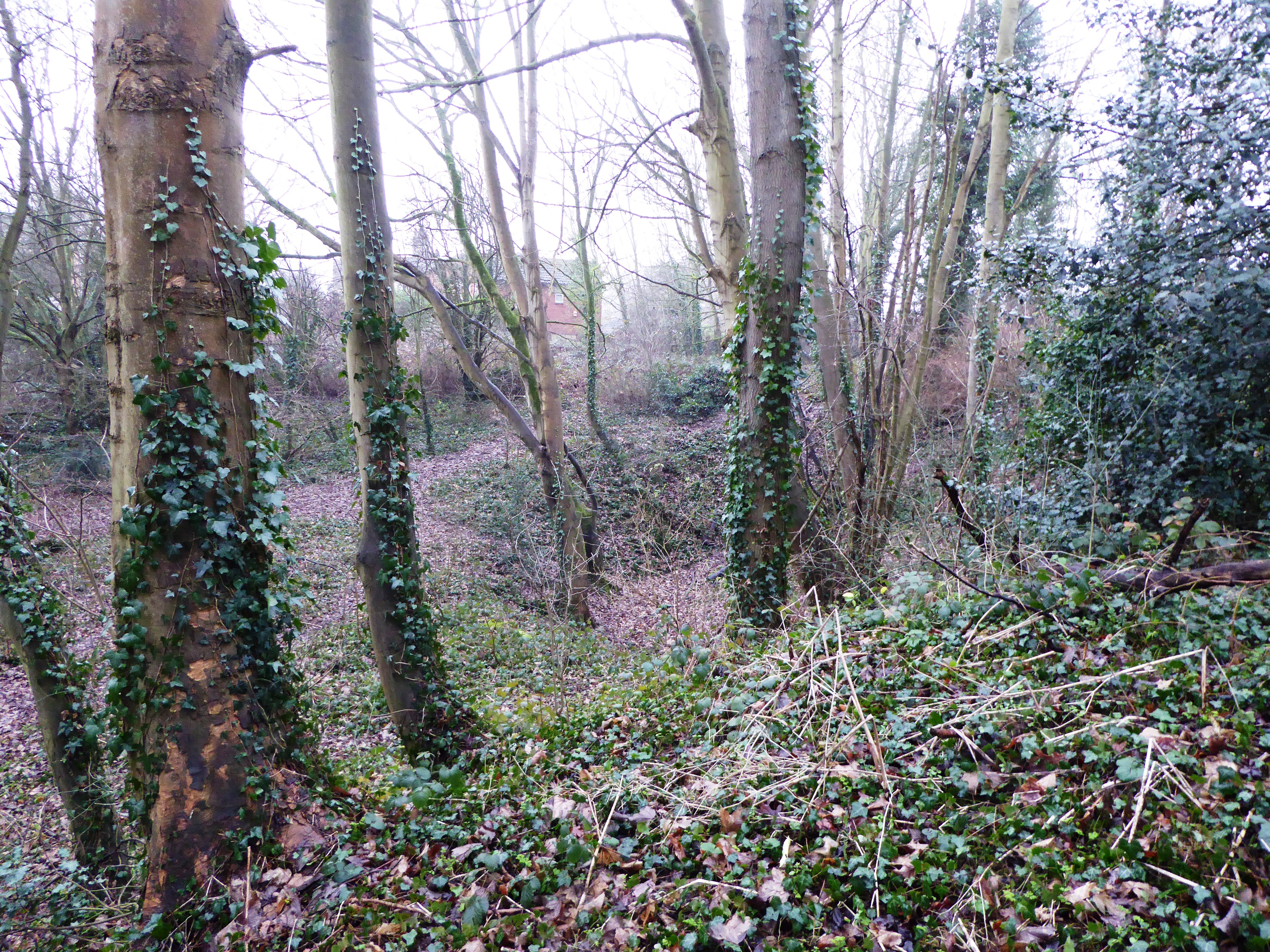
- Location of Sturry Pit.
- Area of search: Kent
- Grid reference: TR 176 607
- Interest: Geological
- Area: 0.7 hectares (1.7 acres)
- Notification date: 1991
- Location map: Magic Map

Sturry Pit is a 0.7 hectares (1.7 acres) geological Site of Special Scientific Interest north-east of Canterbury in Kent. It is a Geological Conservation Review site.

This former gravel quarry has yielded many hand axes of Middle Acheulian style from the third terrace of the River Stour. It is important for understanding the chronologies of the terraces of the Thames basin in the Pleistocene.

There is access to the site from Sturry Hill.

== Land ownership ==
All land within Sturry Pit SSSI is owned by the local authority.
