= Lympne Escarpment =

Site of Special Scientific Interest in Kent, England

Coordinates: 51.07°N 1.03°E

- Site of Special Scientific Interest
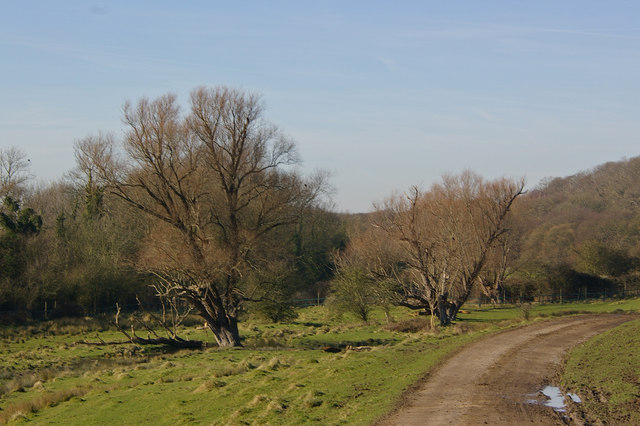
- Location of Lympne Escarpment.
- Area of search: Kent
- Grid reference: TR 124 344
- Interest: Biological
- Area: 140.2 hectares (346 acres)
- Notification date: 1987
- Location map: Magic Map

Lympne Escarpment is a 140.2-hectare (346-acre) biological Site of Special Scientific Interest west of Hythe in Kent, England. Part of it is the remains of a Saxon Shore fort now called Stutfall Castle, which is a Scheduled Monument.

This steeply sloping site has woodland and grassland on Kentish ragstone, with many springs and flushes at the base. It is close to the sea, and the resulting high humidity allows plants such as stinking iris, which are usually confined to woods, to grow in grassland.

Public footpaths cross the site.

Part of the land within Lympne Escarpment SSSI is owned by the Ministry of Defence.
