= Great Crabbles Wood =

Site of Special Scientific Interest in UK

Coordinates: 51.406°N 0.446°E

- Site of Special Scientific Interest
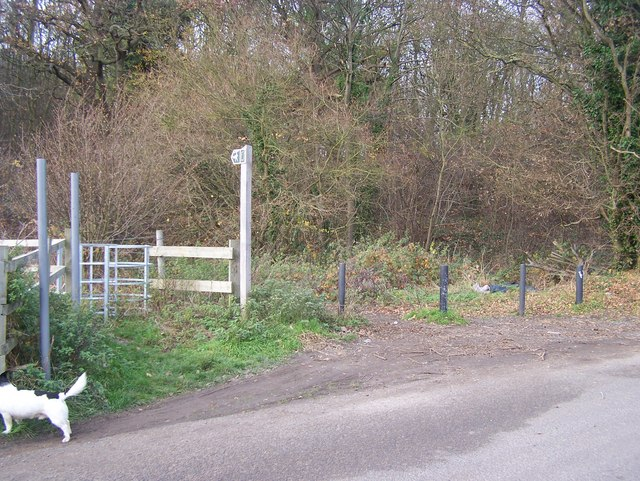
- Location of Great Crabbles Wood.
- Area of search: Kent
- Grid reference: TQ 702 703
- Interest: Biological
- Area: 33.0 hectares (82 acres)
- Notification date: 1984
- Location map: Magic Map

Great Crabbles Wood is a 33-hectare (82-acre) biological Site of Special Scientific Interest north-west of Rochester in Kent.

Most of the wood is mixed coppice, with sweet chestnut dominant and oak standards. There are scarce flora such as lady and man and bird's nest orchids, white helleborine and wild liquorice.

The wood is crossed by footpaths.
