= Spot Lane Quarry =

Site of Special Scientific Interest in Kent, England

Coordinates: 51.258°N 0.568°E

- Site of Special Scientific Interest
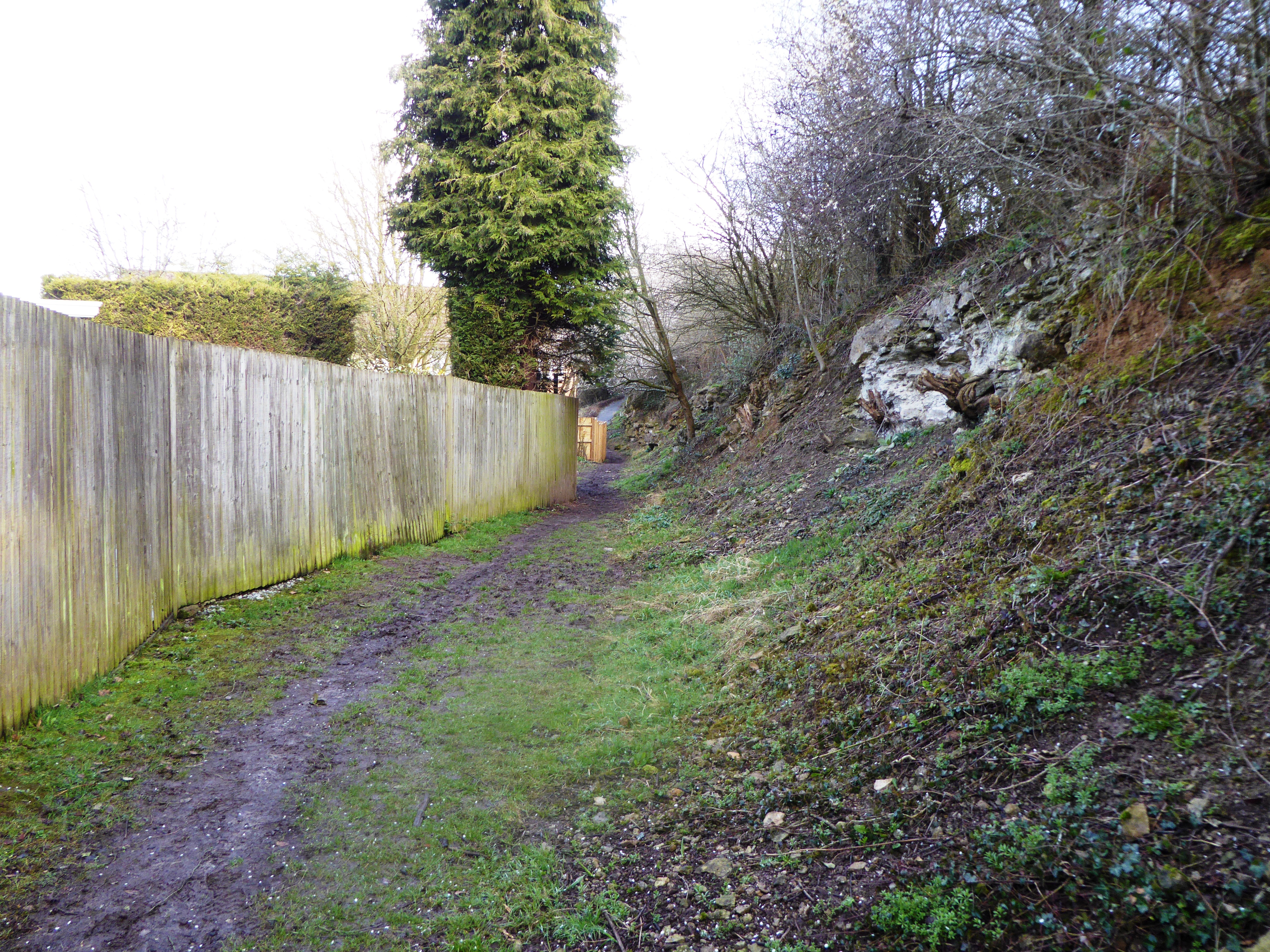
- Location of Spot Lane Quarry.
- Area of search: Kent
- Grid reference: TQ 793 541
- Interest: Geological
- Area: 0.1 hectares (0.25 acres)
- Notification date: 1992
- Location map: Magic Map

Spot Lane Quarry is a 0.1-hectare (0.25-acre) geological Site of Special Scientific Interest on the eastern outskirts of Maidstone in Kent. It is a Geological Conservation Review site.

This site exposes loess, probably dating to the glacial Wolstonian Stage between 352,000 and 130,000 years ago. It contains the fossils of land snails, and as loess in Britain is usually unfossiliferous, it is one of the few sites where loess fauna can be studied.

The site is now a public footpath.

== Land ownership ==
All land within Spot Lane Quarry SSSI is owned by the local authority.
