= Alkham, Lydden and Swingfield Woods =

Woodland in Kent, England

Coordinates: 51.148°N 1.23°E

- Site of Special Scientific Interest
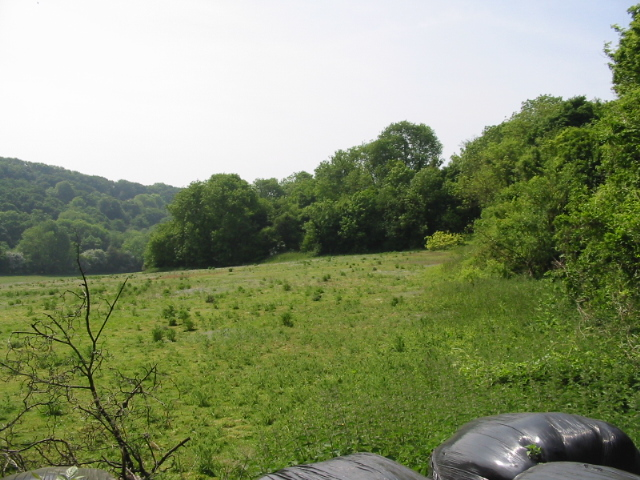
- Location of Alkham, Lydden and Swingfield Woods.
- Area of search: Kent
- Grid reference: TR 260 437
- Interest: Biological
- Area: 228.3 hectares (564 acres)
- Notification date: 1986
- Location map: Magic Map

Alkham, Lydden and Swingfield Woods is a 228.3-hectare (564-acre) biological Site of Special Scientific Interest north-west of Dover in Kent. Alkham Valley Woods is a Nature Conservation Review site, Grade I.

This site is composed of several steeply sloping woods on chalk soil, together with an area of chalk grassland. The ground flora is diverse, including some unusual plants such as lady orchid in the woods and burnt orchid in the meadow.

Public footpaths go through some of the woods but other areas are private land. Part of the land designated as Alkham, Lydden and Swingfield Woods SSSI is owned by the Ministry of Defence.
