= Oldbury and Seal Chart =

Protected area in Kent, England

Coordinates: 51.279°N 0.255°E

- Site of Special Scientific Interest
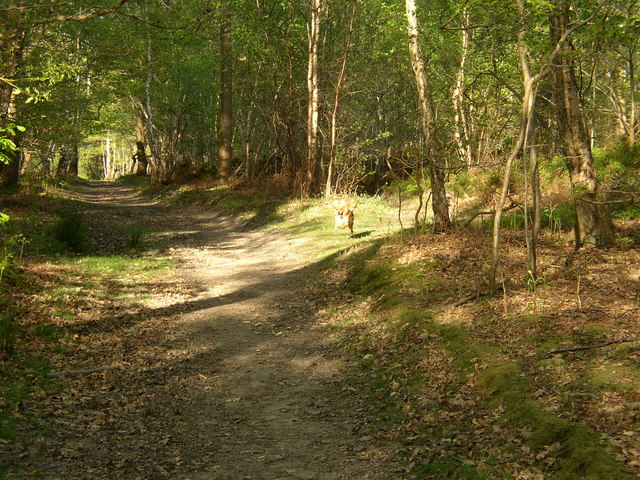
- Redhill Wood, Seal Chart
- Location of Oldbury and Seal Chart.
- Area of search: Kent
- Grid reference: TQ 574 557
- Interest: Biological
- Area: 212.4 hectares (525 acres)
- Notification date: 1990
- Location map: Magic Map

Oldbury and Seal Chart is a 212.4-hectare (525-acre) biological Site of Special Scientific Interest east of Sevenoaks in Kent, England. It is in the Kent Downs Area of Outstanding Natural Beauty, and part of it is Oldbury Hill, a National Trust property and Iron Age hill fort.

More than 250 species of fungi have been recorded in this site, including 10 which are rare or scarce. There are also molluscs which are characteristic of ancient woodland, including the rare snail Phenacolumax major and the scarce slug Limax tenellus.

The site is crossed by several public footpaths.
