= Dalham Farm =

Protected area in Kent, England

Coordinates: 51.449°N 0.557°E

- Site of Special Scientific Interest
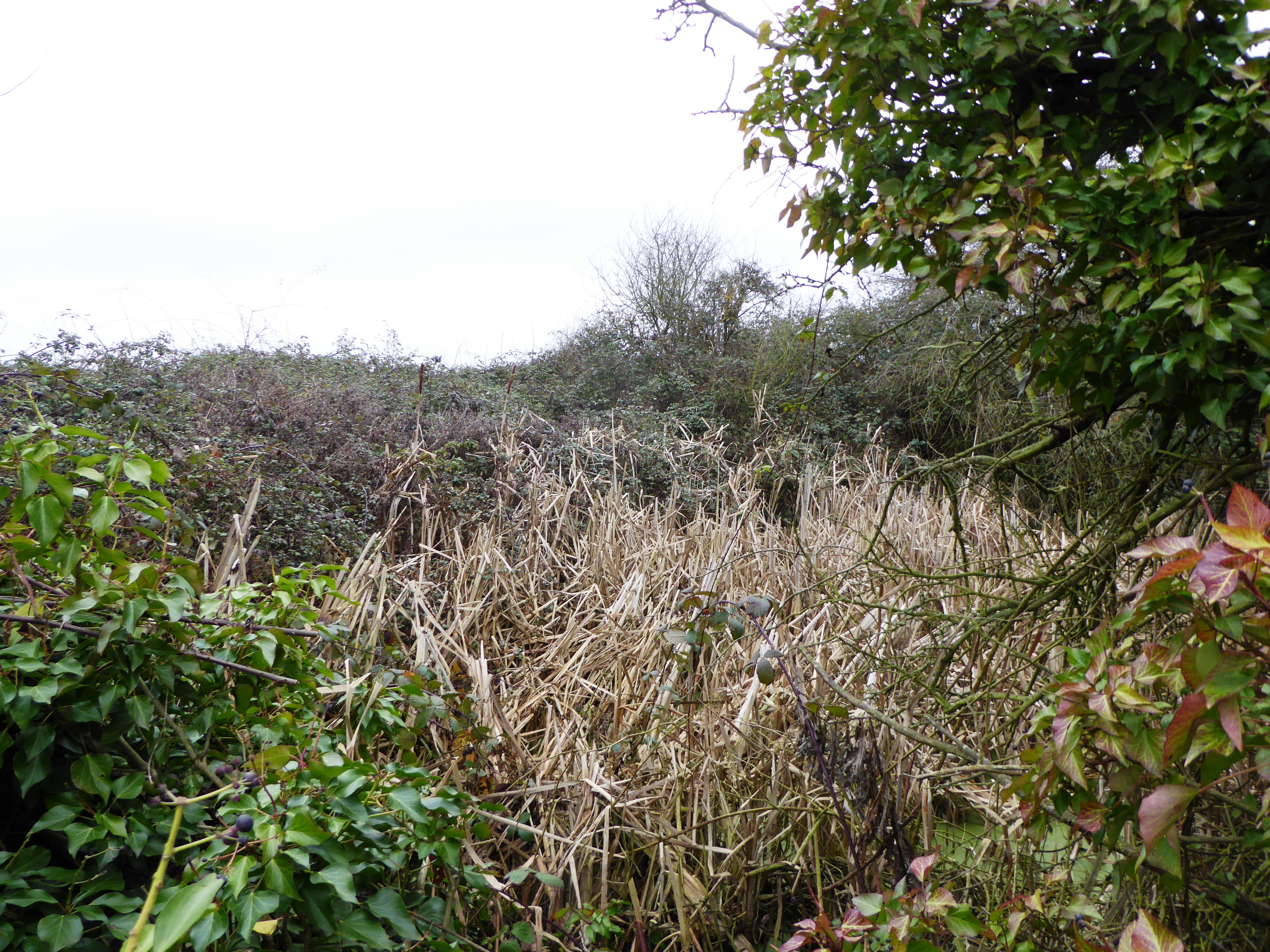
- Location of Dalham Farm.
- Area of search: Kent
- Grid reference: TQ 778 753
- Interest: Geological
- Area: 8.8 hectares (22 acres)
- Notification date: 1987
- Location map: Magic Map

Dalham Farm is an 8.8 hectares (22 acres) geological Site of Special Scientific Interest located in High Halstow, north of Rochester in Kent. It is also designated as a Geological Conservation Review site.

The farm shows mass movement of rock and soil on a shallow 8% slope of London Clay, which is evident in ridges across the site. It may be the lowest angled slope failure in Britain, and is significant in demonstrating slope degradation in the absence of coastal erosion.

A public footpath crosses the site.
