= Ellenden Wood =

Woodland near Whitstable, Kent, England

Coordinates: 51.322°N 1.014°E

- Site of Special Scientific Interest
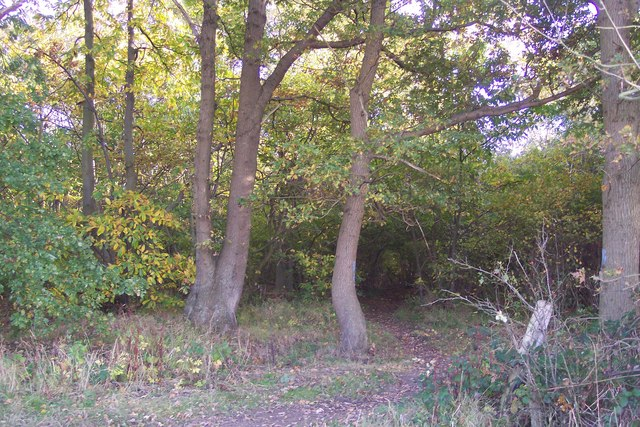
- Location of Ellenden Wood.
- Area of search: Kent
- Grid reference: TR 101 624
- Interest: Biological
- Area: 90.6 hectares (224 acres)
- Notification date: 1985
- Location map: Magic Map

Ellenden Wood is a 90.6-hectare (224-acre) biological Site of Special Scientific Interest south of Whitstable in Kent. It is a Nature Conservation Review site, Grade 2. and a Special Area of Conservation

This wood has diverse flora with over 250 species of vascular plants and 300 of fungi. Insects include 3 species which are nationally rare, and there are mammals such as wood mice, dormice and two species of shrew.

Several public footpaths cross the site.
