= List of Sites of Special Scientific Interest in Oxfordshire =

Oxfordshire in South East England has an area of 2,605 square kilometres and a population of 648,700. In England, the body responsible for designating Sites of Special Scientific Interest (SSSIs) is Natural England, which is responsible for protecting England's natural environment. Notification as an SSSI gives legal protection to the best sites for wildlife and geology. As of 2020, there are 111 SSSIs in Oxfordshire, 78 of which have been designated for biological interest, 27 for geological interest, and 6 for both biological and geological interest.

== Key ==
=== Interest ===
- B = site of biological interest
- G = site of geological interest

=== Public access ===
- FP = access to footpaths through the site only
- No = no public access to site
- PP = public access to part of site
- Yes = public access to all or most of the site

=== Other designations and wildlife trust management ===
- BBOWT = Berkshire, Buckinghamshire and Oxfordshire Wildlife Trust
- GCR = Geological Conservation Review site
- LNR = Local nature reserve
- NCR = Nature Conservation Review site
- NNR = National nature reserve
- Ramsar = Ramsar site, an internationally important wetland site
- SAC = Special Area of Conservation
- SM = Scheduled monument
- SPA = Special Protection Area

== Sites ==
| Site name | Photograph | B | G | Area (Note: The area and grid reference are taken from the "Details" page for each site on the Natural England database.) | Public access | Location | Other | Map (Note: The maps are provided by Natural England on the Magic Map website.) | Citation (Note: Citations are provided for each site by Natural England.) | Description |
|---|---|---|---|---|---|---|---|---|---|---|
| Alvescot Meadows | | ✓ | | 3.0 hectares (7.4 acres) | | Alvescot; 51.743°N 1.606°W; SP 273 050 | | Map | Citation | |
| Appleton Lower Common | Appleton Lower Common | ✓ | | 47.3 hectares (117 acres) | FP | Appleton; 51.703°N 1.386°W; SP 425 007 | | Map | Citation | The common has diverse broadleaved woodland on Oxford Clay with rides and glades. The shrub layer has a rich variety of species, such as primrose, goldilocks buttercup, early purple orchid, twayblade and wood anemone. Invertebrates include the rare club-tailed dragonfly. |
| Ardley Cutting and Quarry | Ardley Cutting | ✓ | ✓ | 40.1 hectares (99 acres) | PP | Ardley; 51.941°N 1.223°W; SP 535 272 | BBOWT, GCR, SM | Map | Citation | The quarry and railway cutting exposes rocks dating to the Bathonian stage of the Middle Jurassic, about 167 million years ago. It is described by Natural England as of national importance for the understanding of the Jurassic Period in Britain as it allows correlation of rocks of the Oxford area to be correlated with those of the Midlands. The site has calcareous grassland with diverse vertebrates, including the internationally protected great crested newt. |
| Ardley Trackways | Ardley Trackways | | ✓ | 63.6 hectares (157 acres) | NO | Bucknell; 51.921°N 1.215°W; SP 541 250 | GCR | Map | Citation | This site is internationally important because it has trackways created by a herd of sauropod (herbivorous) dinosaurs, together with several carnivorous theropods, along a shoreline dating to the Middle Jurassic, around 165 million years ago. These are the only such trackways in England, and one of the few dating to the Middle Jurassic in the world. The tracks throw light on the behaviour and gait of the dinosaours. |
| Arncott Bridge Meadows | Arncott Bridge Meadows | ✓ | | 8.7 hectares (21 acres) | NO | Arncott; 51.862°N 1.118°W; SP 608 185 | | Map | Citation | The site is adjacent to the River Ray and in its flood plain. It is old unimproved hay meadows which display medieval ridge and furrow features, showing that it has not been ploughed for centuries. It lies on Oxford Clay, and some areas are seasonally waterlogged. It has a wide variety of plants, including some rare ones, such as the nationally uncommon narrow-leaved water-dropwort, and the river bank also has unusual plants. |
| Ashdown Park | Ashdown Park | ✓ | | 9.3 hectares (23 acres) | YES | Ashbury; 51.536°N 1.592°W; SU 284 820 | | Map | Citation | The park has been designated an SSSI because of the lichens on its many sarsen boulders. These are in parkland which is heavily grazed to ensure that the lichens, which have taken centuries to grow, do not become shaded. Noteworthy species include Aspicilia caesiocinerea, Buellia saxorum, Candelariella coralliza, Rinodina atrocinerea and Parmelia loxodes. |
| Aston Rowant | Aston Rowant | ✓ | | 127.5 hectares (315 acres) | YES | Shirburn; 51.663°N 0.950°W; SU 727 966 | NCR; NNR; SAC | Map (Note: This site is partly in Buckinghamshire.) | Citation | This site has beech woodland, scrub and chalk grassland. Unusual plants in the ground flora include wood barley, and the orchids Violet and white helleborine. There are several uncommon species of beetles and moths, and fifty breeding bird species. |
| Aston Rowant Cutting | Aston Rowant Cutting | | ✓ | 3.5 hectares (8.6 acres) | YES | Shirburn; 51.662°N 0.943°W; SU 732 964 | GCR | Map | Citation | This cutting provides the best exposure in central England dating to the Coniacian stage of the Late Cretaceous, approximately 88 million years ago. It is part of the Upper Chalk succession, and at its base there is a fossil rich section which is important in defining the boundary between the Coniacian and the preceding Turonian stage. |
| Aston Rowant Woods | Aston Rowant Woods | ✓ | | 209.9 hectares (519 acres) | YES | Aston Rowant; 51.674°N 0.917°W; SU 750 978 | NCR; NNR; SAC | Map | Citation | The site is described by Natural England as "of national importance as a large, unfragmented area of ancient semi-natural woodland characteristic of the Chilterns scarp". Flora include 52 species indicative of ancient woods, and there are over 100 species of fungi. |
| Aston Upthorpe Downs | Aston Upthorpe Downs | ✓ | | 38.5 hectares (95 acres) | YES | Aston Upthorpe; 51.548°N 1.218°W; SU 543 835 | NCR | Map | Citation | This site is a set of dry valleys in the Berkshire Downs. Most of it is chalk grassland which has a rich variety of flora and fauna, and there are also areas of mixed woodland and juniper scrub. Flora include the nationally uncommon wild candytuft and the only population in the county of the rare pasque flower. |
| Barrow Farm Fen | | ✓ | | 6.7 hectares (17 acres) | | Marcham; 51.674°N 1.325°W; SU 468 975 | | Map | Citation | |
| Bear, Oveys and Great Bottom Woods | Oveys Wood | ✓ | | 64.1 hectares (158 acres) | FP | Rotherfield Peppard; 51.544°N 0.995°W; SU 698 833 | | Map | Citation | This beech woodland has more than 40 species of ground flora which is commonly associated with ancient woods in southern Britain, including broad-leaved helleborine, southern wood-rush, yellow archangel, enchanter's nightshade, goldilocks buttercup, woodruff and the moss Leucobryum glaucum. |
| Berins Hill Bank | | ✓ | | 2.1 hectares (5.2 acres) | | Ipsden; 51.561°N 1.059°W; SU 653 851 | | Map | Citation | |
| Berrick Trench | Berrick Trench | ✓ | | 2.1 hectares (5.2 acres) | FP | Swyncombe; 51.588°N 0.984°W; SU 705 882 | | Map | Citation | This is an ancient semi-natural beech wood on the slope of a dry valley in the Upper Chalk. There are many stools of ash, oak, beech, whitebeam, field maple and hazel. Woodland flowering plants include early purple orchid and early dog-violet. |
| Bestmoor | | ✓ | | 12.1 hectares (30 acres) | | North Aston; 51.964°N 1.285°W; SP 492 297 | | Map | Citation | |
| Bix Bottom | Bix Bottom | ✓ | | 102.3 hectares (253 acres) | YES | Swyncombe; 51.585°N 0.968°W; SU 716 879 | BBOWT | Map | Citation | This site has ancient woods which are shown on a map of 1786, together with areas of grassy clearings and scrub. More than 500 species of vascular plant have been recorded, including 18 orchids and the rare meadow clary, which is listed in the British Red Data Book of Plants. There are more than 75 bird species and 650 fungi, including many which are nationally rare. |
| Blenheim Park | Blenheim Park | ✓ | | 224.3 hectares (554 acres) | YES | Woodstock; 51.836°N 1.370°W; SP 435 155 | | Map | Citation | The park was once an Anglo-Saxon chase and then a twelfth-century deer park. It now has some of the best areas of pasture and oak woodland in the country. The large lakes were created in the eighteenth century, and they are regionally important for breeding and wintering birds. Invertebrates include three rare beetles which are included in the British Red Data Book of Invertebrates, Rhizophagus oblongicollis, Plectophloeus nitidus and Aeletesatomarius. |
| Bould Wood | Bould Wood | ✓ | | 58.2 hectares (144 acres) | PP | Chipping Norton; 51.883°N 1.634°W; SP 253 206 | BBOWT | Map | Citation | This site is mainly ancient semi-natural woodland, but it also has two streams, a pond and a wet meadow. The lower plant flora is diverse. Fungi include tricholoma toadstools and Cudoniella clavus, while there are lichens such as Cladonia polydactyla, Catillaria prasina and Graphis scripta. |
| Brasenose Wood and Shotover Hill | Brasenose Wood and Shotover Hill | ✓ | | 109.2 hectares (270 acres) | YES | Headington; 51.764°N 1.186°W; SP 563 056 | NCR | Map | Citation | Most Brasenose Wood is a remnant of the ancient Shotover Forest, and it is one of the few woods which is still managed by the traditional method of coppice-with-standards. It has a very diverse ground flora, and 221 species of vascular plant have been recorded, including 46 which are characteristic of ancient woodland. Shotover hill has heath and unimproved grassland. It is described by Natural England as "of outstanding entomological interest", with many rare flies, bees, wasps and ants. |
| Buckland Warren | | ✓ | | 0.04 hectares (0.099 acres) | NO | Buckland; 51.664°N 1.520°W; SU 333 963 | | Map | Citation | This narrow strip of cultivated land between a wood and a golf course is designated an SSSI because it has a population of the nationally rare broad-leaved cudweed, which has been recorded at less than ten sites in Britain and is listed in the British Red Data Book of Vascular Plants. This annual plant requires disturbance of the soil by ploughing in early to mid October. |
| Cassington Meadows | | ✓ | | 6.9 hectares (17 acres) | | Witney; 51.788°N 1.332°W; SP 462 101 | SAC | Map | Citation | |
| Chimney Meadows | Chimney Meadows | ✓ | | 49.6 hectares (123 acres) | PP | Bampton; 51.698°N 1.492°W; SP 352 000 | BBOWT, NNR | Map | Citation | This site, which consists of six botanically rich alluvial meadows, is bordered on the south by the River Thames. The meadows are intersected by ditches, most of which are covered in reed canary-grass. The most common grasses are crested dog's-tail, creeping bent, perennial rye-grass, hairy sedge and glaucous sedge. |
| Chinnor Chalk Pit | Chinnor Chalk Pit | | ✓ | 20.4 hectares (50 acres) | NO | Chinnor; 51.691°N 0.906°W; SU 757 997 | GCR | Map | Citation | This site is described by Natural England as "important for its excellent exposures Totternhoe Stone", dating to the mid-Cenomanian stage of the Cretaceous period, around 100 million years ago. It has yielded many fossils of ammonites from the Lower and Middle Chalk. |
| Chinnor Hill | Chinnor Hill | ✓ | | 26.8 hectares (66 acres) | YES | Chinnor; 51.699°N 0.893°W; SP 766 006 | BBOWT | Map | Citation | This hill has species-rich calcareous grassland, juniper scrub, which is an uncommon habitat, mixed scrub and woodland. More than 300 species of vascular plant have been recorded and 65 of birds. Many passerines breed in the scrub, and thrushes such as redwings and fieldfares feed on berries in the winter. |
| Cothill Fen | Cothill Fen | ✓ | ✓ | 43.3 hectares (107 acres) | PP | Marcham; 51.698°N 1.333°W; SP 462 001 | BBOWT, GCR, NCR, NNR, SAC | Map | Citation | This site has nationally rare calcareous fen and moss-rich mire habitats and a rich invertebrate fauna, including 25 species in the Red Data Book of Invertebrates. More than 330 vascular plants have been recorded. It is a nationally important site geologically because the sampling the peat gives a picture of the vegetation over the early Holocene, between 10,000 and 6,500 years ago. |
| Culham Brake | | ✓ | | 1.5 hectares (3.7 acres) | | Culham; 51.664°N 1.267°W; SU 508 964 | | Map | Citation | |
| Cumnor | | | ✓ | 0.2 hectares (0.49 acres) | | Oxford; 51.726°N 1.334°W; SP 461 032 | GCR | Map | Citation | |
| Ditchley Road Quarry | | | ✓ | 12.1 hectares (30 acres) | | Charlbury; 51.876°N 1.465°W; SP 369 199 | GCR | Map | Citation | |
| Dry Sandford Pit | Dry Sandford Pit | ✓ | ✓ | 4.2 hectares (10 acres) | YES | Abingdon; 51.691°N 1.326°W; SU 467 994 | BBOWT, GCR | Map | Citation | This former sand quarry exposes a sequence of limestone rocks laid down in shallow coastal waters during the Oxfordian stage of the Jurassic, around 160 million years ago. It has many fossil ammonites. It has diverse calcareous habitats, including fen, grassland, scrub and heath. It is nationally important entomologically, especially for bees and wasps. |
| Ducklington Mead | Ducklington Mead | ✓ | | 4.6 hectares (11 acres) | NO | Ducklington; 51.766°N 1.475°W; SP 363 076 | | Map | Citation | This traditionally managed meadow has diverse flora, such as the rare and declining snake's-head fritillary. Flowering plants in drier areas include saw-wort, dropwort, lady's bedstraw and betony. There are also ditches with interesting wetland flora and an ancient hedge with a variety of shrubs. |
| Fernham Meadows | | ✓ | | 22.5 hectares (56 acres) | | Faringdon; 51.614°N 1.577°W; SU 294 907 | | Map | Citation | |
| Frilford Heath, Ponds and Fens | Frilford Heath, Ponds and Fens | ✓ | | 108.8 hectares (269 acres) | PP | Abingdon; 51.682°N 1.364°W; SU 441 983 | BBOWT | Map | Citation | Natural England describes the acid grassland, heathland and valley fens of this site as unique in southern England. Over 400 vascular plants have been recorded, including some which are nationally rare. There are unusual insects such as the wasp Microdynerus exilis, which was only recognised as native to Britain in the late twentieth century, the red data book of threatened species fly cheilosia mutabalis, and the nationally uncommon Epistrophe diaphana. |
| Glyme Valley | Glyme Valley | ✓ | | 28.9 hectares (71 acres) | PP | Chipping Norton; 51.930°N 1.510°W; SP 338 258 | BBOWT | Map | Citation | This linear site runs along two stretches of the valley of the River Glyme, with the upper area encompassing the river's headwaters. The diverse habitats include the river, ponds, fen, marshy grassland, limestone grassland, scrub and wet woodland. There is a large colony of meadow clary, a rare species which is listed in the British Red Data Book of Vascular Plants. There are several badger setts. |
| Grafton Lock Meadow | | ✓ | | 10.7 hectares (26 acres) | | Faringdon; 51.688°N 1.606°W; SU 273 989 | | Map | Citation | |
| Hackpen, Warren & Gramp's Hill Downs | Warren Down | ✓ | | 71.4 hectares (176 acres) | YES | Childrey; 51.560°N 1.486°W; SU 357 847 | SM | Map | Citation | This site consists of three adjacent areas of unimproved chalk grassland, which are managed by close grazing. Warren Down and Gramp's Hill Down are dominated by upright brome, and most of Hackpen Down by red fescue. Eleven species of butterfly have been recorded, including chalkhill blue, brown argus and marbled white. |
| Harpsden Wood | Harpsden Wood | ✓ | | 29.4 hectares (73 acres) | YES | Henley-on-Thames; 51.517°N 0.906°W; SU 760 804 | | Map | Citation | Most of this ancient wood is on acidic clay with flints, although some areas are on sandy clay or chalky silt. The acid soils have a sparse understorey but there is a diverse ground flora in the calcareous areas. Orchids include broad-leaved helleborine, green-flowered helleborine, bird's-nest orchid and narrow-lipped helleborine. |
| Hartslock | Hartslock | ✓ | | 41.8 hectares (103 acres) | YES | Goring-on-Thames; 51.507°N 1.110°W; SU 619 790 | BBOWT, SAC | Map | Citation | This site on the east bank of the River Thames has diverse semi-natural habitats, including species-rich chalk downland, ancient yew woodland, semi-natural broadleaved woodland, riverside fen and scrub. Hartslock Wood is one of the sites listed in 1915 by Charles Rothschild, the founder of the Wildlife Trusts, as "worthy of preservation". The wood has a variety of tree species including beech and yew, and there is a large colony of badgers. |
| Highlands Farm Pit | Highlands Farm Pit | | ✓ | 0.6 hectares (1.5 acres) | YES | Henley-on-Thames; 51.526°N 0.930°W; SU 743 813 | GCR | Map | Citation | The site exposes gravel from the abandoned channel of the River Thames before the Anglian ice age pushed the river south around 450,000 years ago. It may date to the late Anglian Black Park Terrace which would make it the latest known exposure of the gravel floor of the old channel, and therefore of considerable importance. It has revealed large quantities of Palaeolithic flints, which are some of the earliest of their type known. It is described by Natural England as a "crucial site". |
| Holly Court Bank | | ✓ | | 4.4 hectares (11 acres) | | Witney; 51.833°N 1.441°W; SP 386 151 | | Map | Citation | |
| Holly Wood | Holly Wood | ✓ | | 25.6 hectares (63 acres) | NO | Oxford; 51.786°N 1.150°W; SP 587 100 | | Map | Citation | This ancient wood is a small remnant of the medieval Royal Forest of Shotover. It is coppice with standards on Oxford Clay with a varied invertebrate fauna. There are several uncommon butterfiles such as the black hairstreak and purple emperor. |
| Holton Wood | Holton Wood | ✓ | | 50.6 hectares (125 acres) | FP | Oxford; 51.767°N 1.133°W; SP 599 079 | | Map | Citation | This ancient wood was formerly part of Bernwood Forest, which was a medieval hunting forest. It is semi-natural coppice with standards, with fine oak standards of varying ages. It has a rich invertebrate fauna, including 27 species of butterfly, with uncommon species such as white admiral and purple emperor. |
| Hook Meadow and The Trap Grounds | Hook Meadow and The Trap Grounds | ✓ | | 11.9 hectares (29 acres) | NO | Oxford; 51.777°N 1.278°W; SP 499 089 | | Map | Citation | These unimproved meadows in the floodplain of the River Thames are poorly drained and they have calcareous clay soils. The southern field is the most waterlogged, and its flora includes wetland species such as sharp-flowered rush, marsh arrow grass, common spike-rush and early marsh orchid. |
| Hook Norton Cutting and Banks | Hook Norton Cutting and Banks | ✓ | ✓ | 6.7 hectares (17 acres) | PP | Chipping Norton; 51.982°N 1.480°W; SP 358 316 | BBOWT, GCR | Map | Citation | Hook Norton Cutting is a nature reserve along two stretches of a disused railway line separated by a tunnel. Most of it is unimproved calcareous grassland with a rich variety of flora. The site is notable for its bee species, including one which has only been recorded at three other sites in the country, Andrena bucephala. The cutting exposes rocks dating to the Middle Jurassic, around 167 million years ago, which are the type section of the Hook Norton Member of the Chipping Norton Formation. Hook Norton Bank is a steeply sloping limestone grassland by the River Swere. |
| Horsehay Quarries | Horsehay Quarries | | ✓ | 8.4 hectares (21 acres) | NO | Chipping Norton; 51.941°N 1.338°W; SP 456 272 | GCR | Map | Citation | These quarries expose rocks dating to the Middle Jurassic period. The sequence runs from the Northampton Sand Formation of the Aalenian about 172 million years ago to the Taynton Limestone Formation of the Middle Bathonian around 167 million years ago. |
| Hurst Hill | Hurst Hill | ✓ | ✓ | 20.6 hectares (51 acres) | YES | Cumnor; 51.734°N 1.312°W; SP 476 041 | GCR | Map | Citation | The site is owned by All Souls College, Oxford, and its mosses and liverworts have been monitored for more than fifty years. The hill is also important geologically. In 1879 a fossil of a Camptosaurus prestwichii, a large herbivorous dinosaur dating to the Upper Jurassic 143 million years ago, was found on the site. The fossil belongs to a typically North African genus, and provides evidence of a land bridge across the proto-Atlantic in the Late Jurassic. |
| Iffley Meadows | Iffley Meadows | ✓ | | 36.1 hectares (89 acres) | YES | Oxford; 51.730°N 1.244°W; SP 523 037 | BBOWT | Map | Citation | These flood meadows between two arms of the River Thames are traditionally managed for hay and pasture. A large part of the site is on clay, and it is enriched by silt each year when it is flooded. There is a rich grassland flora, with the outstanding feature being 89,000 snake's head fritillaries, which produce purple flowers in the spring. There is a network of old river channels, ditches and overgrown hedges. |
| Kirtlington Quarry | Kirtlington Quarry | | ✓ | 3.1 hectares (7.7 acres) | YES | Kidlington; 51.875°N 1.284°W; SP 494 199 | GCR, LNR | Map | Citation | Britain has the only five Middle Jurassic mammal sites in the world, and this disused quarry has yielded the richest and most diverse assemblage. It dates to the Upper Bathonian, around 150 million years ago. There are nine therian and prototherians species, together with a tritylodontid. There are also fossils of theropod dinosaurs, crocodilians, pterosaurs, fishes and many shark teeth. |
| Knightsbridge Lane | Knightsbridge Lane | ✓ | | 1.7 hectares (4.2 acres) | YES | Watlington; 51.667°N 1.104°W; SU 683 969 | | Map | Citation | This site consists of woodland on the sides of a minor road, which has approximately one tenth of the population in the country of a very rare plant, green hound's tongue. It is listed in the British Red Data Book of vascular plants, and it is found at only seven other locations in Britain. The species is often found in disturbed soils, and may have increased following the clearance of dead elm trees. |
| Lamb and Flag Quarry | | | ✓ | 0.2 hectares (0.49 acres) | | Abingdon; 51.674°N 1.452°W; SU 380 974 | GCR | Map | Citation | |
| Lambridge Wood | Lambridge Wood | ✓ | | 74.6 hectares (184 acres) | YES | Henley-on-Thames; 51.551°N 0.937°W; SU 738 841 | | Map | Citation | Soil types in the wood vary from calcareous to very acid. The main trees are beech, and other trees include oak, ash and wych elm. The understorey in mainly bramble, and in some areas bracken. |
| Langley's Lane Meadow | | ✓ | | 3.3 hectares (8.2 acres) | | Witney; 51.710°N 1.436°W; SP 391 014 | | Map | Citation | |
| Little Tew Meadows | Little Tew Meadows | ✓ | | 40.0 hectares (99 acres) | FP | Little Tew; 51.950°N 1.453°W; SP 377 281 | | Map | Citation | This site is composed of four adjoining unimproved meadows. One is used for hay while the rest are managed by cattle grazing. Two have prominent ridge and furrow dating to medieval farming practices. There are also extensive flushes and outcrops of limestone around the site of a former quarry. |
| Little Wittenham | Little Wittenham | ✓ | | 68.9 hectares (170 acres) | YES | Dorchester-on-Thames; 51.631°N 1.175°W; SU 572 928 | SAC | Map | Citation | This site, which is managed by the Earth Trust, consists of woods, grassland, scrub and ponds on the slope of a hill next to the River Thames. Flora include the nationally scarce greater dodder, and there is a rich assemblage of amphibians, including one of the largest populations in the country of the great crested newt, which is a priority species of the Biodiversity action plan. |
| Littlemore Railway Cutting | Littlemore Railway Cutting | | ✓ | 0.5 hectares (1.2 acres) | NO | Oxford; 51.721°N 1.234°W; SP 530 027 | GCR | Map | Citation | The cutting exposes limestone and clay laid down in mid-Oxfordian stage of the Late Jurassic, around 160 million years ago. The deposit is part of the Stanford Formation, and the clay appears to have been deposited in a channel between coral reefs which then covered the Oxford area. |
| Littleworth Brick Pit | | | ✓ | 1.5 hectares (3.7 acres) | | Oxford; 51.744°N 1.148°W; SP 589 054 | GCR | Map | Citation | |
| Long Hanborough Gravel Pit | | | ✓ | 3.7 hectares (9.1 acres) | | Witney; 51.819°N 1.394°W; SP 419 136 | GCR | Map | Citation | |
| Lye Valley | Lye Valley | ✓ | | 2.3 hectares (5.7 acres) | YES | Oxford; 51.746°N 1.209°W; SP 547 056 | LNR | Map | Citation | This a calcareous valley fen, which is a nationally rare and threatened habitat. It is drained by the Lye Brook. There is a variety of moss species, such as Drepanocladus revolvens and Campylium stellatum. Invertebrates include the nationally rare soldier fly, Vanoyia tenuicornis and the uncommon spiders, Xysticus ulmi and Anistea elegans. |
| Lyehill Quarry | Lyehill Quarry | | ✓ | 2.8 hectares (6.9 acres) | NO | Oxford; 51.757°N 1.144°W; SP 592 068 | GCR | Map | Citation | This disused quarry exposes rocks dating to the Wheatley Limestone member of the Stanford Formation, approximately 160 million years ago during the Middle Jurassic. The deposits are limestones in an unstable reef substrate, and the only fossils are of oysters. |
| Magdalen Grove | | | ✓ | 0.4 hectares (0.99 acres) | | Oxford; 51.755°N 1.250°W; SP 519 065 | GCR | Map | Citation | |
| Magdalen Quarry | | | ✓ | 0.3 hectares (0.74 acres) | | Oxford; 51.760°N 1.203°W; SP 551 071 | GCR, LNR | Map | Citation | |
| Middle Barton Fen | | ✓ | | 11.6 hectares (29 acres) | | Chipping Norton; 51.933°N 1.356°W; SP 444 263 | | Map | Citation | |
| Moulsford Downs | Moulsford Down | ✓ | | 13.6 hectares (34 acres) | NO | Moulsford; 51.539°N 1.169°W; SU 577 826 | | Map | Citation | This chalk grassland site on the Berkshire Downs has a rich wildlife. The diverse invertebrate fauna includes the uncommon robber-fly Leptarthrus brevirostris, the adonis blue butterfly, the juniper shield bug, the weevils Baris picicornis and seed beetle Phyllobius viridicollis, the leaf beetle Phyllotreta nodicornis and the Bruchus cisti. |
| Murcott Meadows | | ✓ | | 22.5 hectares (56 acres) | | Oxford; 51.521°N 1.143°W; SP 592 139 | BBOWT | Map | Citation | |
| Neithrop Fields Cutting | Neithrop Fields Cutting | | ✓ | 1.4 hectares (3.5 acres) | YES | Banbury; 52.074°N 1.362°W; SP 438 419 | GCR | Map | Citation | This site exhibits sections dating to the Early Jurassic around 190 to 180 million years ago. Its Middle Lias sediments show that it was adjacent to the "London landmass", which was then an island. The Upper Lias have a section rich in fossil ammonites. Natural England describes the site as a "key palaeogeographic and stratigraphic locality". |
| New Marston Meadows | New Marston Meadows | ✓ | | 44.7 hectares (110 acres) | PP | Oxford; 51.765°N 1.248°W; SP 520 076 | | Map | Citation | These meadows in the floodplain of the River Cherwell are traditionally managed for hay or by grazing. Some plants are typical of those on ancient meadows, such as common meadow-rue, pepper-saxifrage, devil's-bit scabious, adder's-tongue fern, smooth brome and meadow barley. Snake's head fritillary, which is nationally scarce, is also found at the site. |
| Otmoor | Otmoor | ✓ | | 213.0 hectares (526 acres) | PP | Murcott; 51.820°N 1.169°W; SP 574 138 | | Map | Citation | This site in the floodplain of the River Ray has herb-rich damp grassland, wet sedge, coarse grassland, woodland, pools and ditches. More than sixty species of bird breed on the site, such as curlew and lapwing, while wintering birds include teal, wigeon, snipe, golden plover and short-eared owl. |
| Out Wood | Out Wood | ✓ | | 19.2 hectares (47 acres) | PP | Woodstock; 51.883°N 1.410°W; SP 407 207 | | Map | Citation | This semi-natural wood is a surviving fragment of the medieval Royal Forest of Wychwood. It is overgrown coppice with standards, and the standards are oaks between 30 and 150 years old. Rides have a diverse ground flora, including meadow saffron, broad-leaved helleborine and greater butterfly orchid. |
| Pishill Woods | Pishill Woods | ✓ | | 42.8 hectares (106 acres) | PP | Henley-on-Thames; 51.606°N 0.972°W; SU 713 902 | | Map | Citation | These semi-natural woods have a rich ground flora, including 35 species associated with ancient woodland. The southern part is dominated by beech and oak coppice, whereas the north, which has been managed as high forest, has mainly mature beech trees, with smaller numbers of oak, ash, cherry, whitebeam, yew and wych elm. The southern part is common land. |
| Pixey and Yarnton Meads | Pixey and Yarnton Meads | ✓ | | 86.4 hectares (213 acres) | PP | Oxford; 51.788°N 1.308°W; SP 478 102 | NCR, SAC | Map | Citation | These are unimproved flood meadows on the bank of the River Thames. Their management is very well recorded, and it is known that they have been grazed and cut for hay for more than a thousand years, with the result that they are botanically rich, with more than 150 species. The site has been the subject of detailed botanical and hydrological research. |
| Port Meadow with Wolvercote Common and Green | Port Meadow | ✓ | | 167.1 hectares (413 acres) | PP | Oxford; 51.774°N 1.287°W; SP 493 086 | NCR, SAC, SM | Map | Citation | This site consists of meadows in the floodplain of the River Thames. It is thought to have been grazed for over a thousand years and is a classic site for studying the effects of grazing on flora. There is a low diversity compared with neighbouring fields which are cut for hay, but 178 flowering plants have been recorded, including creeping marshwort, which is a Red Data Book species not found anywhere else in Britain. |
| Priest's Hill | | | ✓ | 1.0 hectare (2.5 acres) | | Henley-on-Thames; 51.579°N 0.993°W; SU 699 872 | GCR | Map | Citation | |
| Reed Hill | Reed Hill | ✓ | | 14.0 hectares (35 acres) | NO | Witney; 51.584°N 1.450°W; SP 380 174 | | Map | Citation | This sheltered dry valley has unimproved limestone grassland, secondary woodland and scrub. A spring at the northern end makes the ground there seasonally damp. Invertebrates include the small blue, Duke of Burgundy and dark green fritillary butterflies, the small shield bug Neotti-glossa pusilla, the beetle Oedemera lurida and the spider Hypsosinga pygmaea. |
| Rock Edge | Rock Edge | | ✓ | 1.7 hectares (4.2 acres) | YES | Oxford; 51.754°N 1.206°W; SP 549 064 | GCR, LNR | Map | Citation | This site exposes limestone rich in coral called Coral rag, laid down when the area was under a warm, shallow sea, similar to the Bahama Banks today. It is rich in fossils derived from the coral reefs. It dates to the Upper Jurassic, around 145 million years ago. |
| Rushy Meadows | Rushy Meadows | ✓ | | 8.9 hectares (22 acres) | NO | Kidlington; 51.824°N 1.303°W; SP 481 142 | | Map | Citation | This site consists of unimproved alluvial grasslands on the bank of the Oxford Canal. The species-rich sward is dominated by hard rush, and other plants include water avens, which is very uncommon in the Thames Basin, pepper saxifrage, devil's bit scabious, early marsh orchid and distant sedge. |
| Salt Way, Ditchley | Salt Way, Ditchley | ✓ | | 2.0 hectares (4.9 acres) | YES | Chipping Norton; 51.873°N 1.444°W; SP 384 195 | LNR | Map | Citation | This is a stretch of an ancient track together with its species-rich grass verges and hedges. It has been designated an SSSI because it has the largest known British colony of the very rare downy woundwort, with more than 100 seedlings and 60 flowering stems. The plant is associated with hedges along Roman roads and ancient tracks on calcareous soils, and Salt Way may date to the Roman period. |
| Sarsgrove Wood | Sarsgrove Wood | ✓ | | 41.9 hectares (104 acres) | NO | Chipping Norton; 51.916°N 1.559°W; SP 304 243 | | Map | Citation | This ancient wood has a diverse geology resulting in a variety of soil conditions. A stream with poorly drained valley walls runs through the wood. More freely-drained areas have ground flora including early-purple orchid, primrose, bluebell, early dog-violet, sweet violet and narrow-leaved everlasting pea. |
| Sharp's Hill Quarry | Sharp's Hill Quarry | | ✓ | 2.4 hectares (5.9 acres) | NO | Banbury; 52.020°N 1.510°W; SP 337 358 | GCR | Map | Citation | This is the type locality of the Sharp's Hill Formation. It is very fossiliferous and dates to the Bathonian stage of the Middle Jurassic, around 167 million years ago. It is very important for understanding the Bathonian succession in north Oxfordshire. Strata of the underlying Chipping Norton Formation are also present. |
| Sheep's Banks | Sheep's Bank | ✓ | | 5.1 hectares (13 acres) | NO | Woodstock; 51.885°N 1.359°W; SP 442 209 | | Map | Citation | This steeply sloping site is species-rich grassland which is traditionally managed. An ancient hedge runs the length of the site and a small stream runs along the downward side. Flora include five species of orchid, including bee, pyramidal and green-winged. |
| Shellingford Crossroads Quarry | Shellingford Crossroads Quarry | | ✓ | 2.6 hectares (6.4 acres) | YES | Faringdon; 51.645°N 1.530°W; SU 326 941 | GCR | Map | Citation | This site exposes rocks of the Corallian Group, dating to the Oxfordian stage of the Late Jurassic, around 160 million years ago. It has many fossils of corals and reef-dwelling bivalves, and it is also important as it provides an example of the complexity of Oxfordian stratigraphy. |
| Shipton-on-Cherwell and Whitehill Farm Quarries | Shipton-on-Cherwell and Whitehill Farm Quarries | | ✓ | 27.0 hectares (67 acres) | NO | Kidlington; 51.852°N 1.309°W; SP 477 173 | GCR | Map | Citation | This site exposes a lithostratigraphic succession dating to the Bathonian stage of the Middle Jurassic, around 167 million years ago. Shipton-on-Cherwell Quarry is described by Natural England as "of international importance as one of the best Upper Bathonian reptile sites known", and it has yielded type material for two species of crocodile. The quarry has also produced the type specimen of the dinosaur Dacentrurus vetustus. |
| Shirburn Hill | Shirburn Hill | ✓ | | 63.7 hectares (157 acres) | YES | Watlington; 51.653°N 0.968°W; SU 715 954 | | Map | Citation | The hill has chalk grassland, chalk heath, scrub and broadleaved woodland. Most grasslands in the Chilterns are maintained by stock, and the site is unusual in being cropped only by rabbits. Less closely grazed areas have taller grass with species such as false oat-grass, tor-grass and red fescue. There are large areas of hawthorn and buckthorn scrub. |
| Sidling's Copse and College Pond | | ✓ | | 21.7 hectares (54 acres) | | Oxford; 51.781°N 1.200°W; SP 553 094 | BBOWT | Map | Citation | |
| Spartum Fen | | ✓ | | 7.6 hectares (19 acres) | | Oxford; 51.709°N 1.055°W; SP 654 016 | | Map | Citation | |
| Stanton Great Wood | Stanton Great Wood | ✓ | | 58.2 hectares (144 acres) | NO | Oxford; 51.778°N 1.149°W; SP 588 092 | | Map | Citation | This coppice with standards wood is traditionally managed. The dominant trees are pedunculate oak, ash and hazel, and there is a rich flora and diverse insects. Moths include the buff footman, poplar lutestring, blotched emerald, maiden's blush and the nationally uncommon small black arches. |
| Stanton Harcourt | | | ✓ | 0.5 hectares (1.2 acres) | | Witney; 51.743°N 1.402°W; SP 414 051 | GCR | Map | Citation | |
| Stonesfield Common, Bottoms and Banks | Stonesfield Common, Bottoms and Banks | ✓ | | 26.9 hectares (66 acres) | PP | Witney; 51.846°N 1.432°W; SP 392 165 | | Map | Citation | This site is composed of steeply sloping valleys and banks. Most of it is unimproved limestone grassland and scrub, but there is also an area of semi-natural ancient woodland. The grass in Stonesfield Common is mainly upright brome, and herbs include field scabious, greater knapweed, lady's bedstraw and pyramidal orchid. |
| Stonesfield Slate Mines | | | ✓ | 0.8 hectares (2.0 acres) | | Witney; 51.850°N 1.444°W; SP 384 170 | GCR | Map | Citation | |
| Stratton Audley Quarries | | | ✓ | 8.6 hectares (21 acres) | | Bicester; 51.920°N 1.128°W; SP 601 250 | GCR | Map | Citation | |
| Sturt Copse | Sturt Copse | ✓ | | 6.5 hectares (16 acres) | FP | Witney; 51.832°N 1.422°W; SP 399 150 | | Map | Citation | This wood has many giant stools of coppiced of ash and wych elm trees, together with oaks, some of them pollarded. Most of the ground layer is dominated by dog's mercury, and there are uncommon plants such as yellow star-of-Bethlehem, Lathraea squamaria and hard shield-fern. |
| Sugworth | Sugworth | | ✓ | 0.6 hectares (1.5 acres) | NO | Abingdon; 51.703°N 1.261°W; SP 512 007 | GCR | Map | Citation | This site dates to the Cromerian Stage, an interglacial over half a million years ago. It is a river channel cut into Kimmeridge Clay of the Late Jurassic, and it has rich deposits of vertebrates, ostracods, molluscs, beetles, plant remains and pollen. |
| Swyncombe Downs | Swyncombe Downs | ✓ | | 47.1 hectares (116 acres) | PP | Henley-on-Thames; 51.615°N 1.025°W; SU 676 911 | SM | Map | Citation | This is an area of chalk grassland and scrub on the steep slopes of the Chiltern Hills. The site is described by Natural England as outstanding for its butterflies and moths. Butterflies include the silver-spotted skipper, which is nationally rare, grizzled skipper, grizzled skipper and dark green fritillary. There are day flying moths such as the cistus forester, chimney sweeper and wood tiger. |
| Taynton Quarries | | ✓ | | 40.0 hectares (99 acres) | | Taynton; 51.833°N 1.660°W; SP 235 150 | | Map | Citation | |
| Tuckmill Meadows | | ✓ | | 5.7 hectares (14 acres) | | Shrivenham; 51.607°N 1.656°W; SU 239 899 | LNR | Map | Citation | |
| Warren Bank | Warren Bank | ✓ | | 3.1 hectares (7.7 acres) | YES | Wallingford; 51.566°N 1.059°W; SU 653 857 | BBOWT | Map | Citation | This steeply sloping site has unimproved chalk grassland and scrub. There is a rich variety of flora, including horseshoe vetch, chalk milkwort and bee orchid. There are also many insects, with butterflies such as dark green fritillary and green hairstreak. |
| Waterperry Wood | Waterperry Wood | ✓ | | 137.0 hectares (339 acres) | YES | Forest Hill; 51.778°N 1.124°W; SP 605 092 | NCR | Map | Citation | This wood has been designated an SSSI because it contains a diverse and important insect fauna, with many nationally uncommon and rare species. There are nineteen species of nationally uncommon hoverflies, including five which are listed in the British Red Data Book of Insects, many nationally uncommon beetles, thirty butterfly species and several rare moths. |
| Watlington and Pyrton Hills | Watlington Hill | ✓ | | 112.7 hectares (278 acres) | PP | Watlington; 51.639°N 0.983°W; SU 705 938 | LNR | Map | Citation | This site has floristically diverse chalk grassland, chalk scrub, broadleaved woodland and yew woodland. Watlington Hill has short turf which is grazed by rabbits, with flowering plants including yellow-wort, dropwort, horseshoe vetch, squinancywort and the nationally rare candytuft. |
| Wendlebury Meads and Mansmoor Closes | Wendlebury Meads | ✓ | | 74.1 hectares (183 acres) | FP | Kidlington; 51.853°N 1.190°W; SP 561 175 | BBOWT, NCR | Map | Citation | Wendlebury Meads consists of several meadows which have been traditionally managed, and have complex and varied flora. It is one of the few Calcareous pastures to have survived agricultural improvements. Almost all show evidence of medieval ridge and furrow ploughing. Mansmoor Closes were enclosed before 1622, and are important from both a landscape and archaeological point of view. More than 160 plant species have been recorded on the site. |
| Weston Fen | Weston Fen | ✓ | | 14.0 hectares (35 acres) | FP | Bicester; 51.872°N 1.239°W; SP 525 195 | | Map | Citation | This site has diverse habitats, including a fast-flowing stream, species-rich, calcareous fen, willow carr, hazel woodland, limestone grassland and marshy grassland. There are several rare species of beetle, such as Sphaerius acaroides, Eubria palustris, Silis ruficollis and Agabus biguttatus. |
| Westwell Gorse | | ✓ | | 2.5 hectares (6.2 acres) | | Burford; 51.800°N 1.684°W; SP 219 113 | | Map | Citation | |
| Whitecross Green and Oriel Woods | Whitecross Green | ✓ | | 63.0 hectares (156 acres) | YES | Murcott; 51.825°N 1.128°W; SP 602 144 | BBOWT | Map | Citation | These ancient woods are part of two former royal forests, Shotover and Bernwood. They are crossed by herb-rich and grassy rides, some of which are bordered by ditches, and there is also a pond and a marsh. Twenty-four species of butterfly have been recorded including the nationally rare black hairstreak. |
| Whitehill Wood | | ✓ | | 3.4 hectares (8.4 acres) | | Witney; 51.836°N 1.434°W; SP 391 154 | | Map | Citation | |
| Whitehorse Hill | Whitehorse Hill | ✓ | ✓ | 99.0 hectares (245 acres) | PP | Faringdon; 51.578°N 1.568°W; SU 300 867 | GCR, SM | Map | Citation | This dry valley provides evidence of solifluction (slow sloping downhill due to repeated freezing and thawing) during at least one cold stage of the Pleistocene. The site has unimproved chalk grassland with a rich variety of flora, particularly in former chalk quarries. Grasses include upright brome and sheep’s fescue. |
| Wicklesham and Coxwell Pits | | | ✓ | 12.6 hectares (31 acres) | | Faringdon; 51.645°N 1.579°W; SU 292 941 | GCR | Map | Citation | |
| Wolvercote Meadows | Wolvercote Meadows | ✓ | | 7.1 hectares (18 acres) | PP | Oxford; 51.783°N 1.298°W; SP 485 096 | SAC | Map | Citation | These meadows next to the River Thames are traditionally managed for pasture and hay, and they have a rich flora. The largest, which is called Great Baynham's Meadow, is used as pasture, and the other fields are managed for hay with grazing in the autumn. There are also watercourses which have many dragonflies. |
| Woodeaton Quarry | Woodeaton Quarry | | ✓ | 7.3 hectares (18 acres) | YES | Oxford; 51.806°N 1.228°W; SP 533 122 | GCR | Map | Citation | This site exposes a sequence of rocks dating to the Middle Jurassic around 167 million years ago. It exhibits one of the most complete Bathonian sections in the county, and is described by Natural England as "of great palaeontological and sedimentological interest". |
| Woodeaton Wood | Woodeaton Wood | ✓ | | 14.0 hectares (35 acres) | NO | Oxford; 51.796°N 1.218°W; SP 540 111 | | Map | Citation | This coppice with standards on calcareous soil is a fragment of the ancient Shotover Forest. The ground layer has plants such as wood anemone, nettle-leaved bellflower, ramsons, goldilocks buttercup, early dog-violet and enchanter's nightshade. |
| Wormsley Chalk Banks | Wormsley Chalk Banks | ✓ | | 14.8 hectares (37 acres) | PP | Stokenchurch; 51.634°N 0.926°W; SU 744 934 | | Map | Citation | The site has chalk grassland which is rich in both plant and invertebrate species which have sharply declined nationally. Flowers include bee and fly orchids, the latter of which is becoming scarce. Invertebrates include a variety of butterflies, harvest spiders and slowworms. |
| Worsham Lane | | ✓ | | 0.4 hectares (0.99 acres) | | Witney; 51.784°N 1.556°W; SP 307 096 | | Map | Citation | |
| Wychwood | Wychwood | ✓ | | 501.7 hectares (1,240 acres) | PP | Witney; 51.851°N 1.512°W; SP 337 170 | NCR, NNR, SM | Map | Citation | This remnant of a large royal hunting forest is the largest area of ancient broadleaved forest in the county, and the site also has limestone grassland and four marl lakes. More than 360 species of flowering plants and ferns have been recorded, together with 85 lichens and 60 mosses and liverworts. The invertebrate fauna is diverse, including 17 rare flies. |
| Wytham Ditches and Flushes | Wytham Ditches and Flushes | ✓ | | 2.7 hectares (6.7 acres) | NO | Wytham; 51.785°N 1.327°W; SP 465 098 | | Map | Citation | These ditches have a rich aquatic and fen flora. Uncommon wetland plants include greater water-parsnip, greater spearwort, water violet, brookweed, narrow-leaved water plantain and creeping jenny. There is also a small tussocky field which is kept partly waterlogged by flushes. |
| Wytham Woods | Wytham Wood | ✓ | | 423.8 hectares (1,047 acres) | YES | Wytham; 51.769°N 1.330°W; SP 463 080 | NCR | Map | Citation | Habitats in this site, which formerly belonged to Abingdon Abbey, include ancient woodland and limestone grassland. Over 500 species of vascular plant have been recorded, and more data about the bird, mammal and invertebrate fauna, have probably been recorded about this site than any other in the country as a result of studies by Oxford University. More than 900 species of beetles, 580 of flies, 200 of spiders, 700 of bees, wasps and ant, 250 of true bugs and 27 of earthworms have been recorded. |

== See also ==
- Berkshire, Buckinghamshire and Oxfordshire Wildlife Trust
- List of local nature reserves in Oxfordshire

== Sources ==
- Ratcliffe, Derek, ed. (1977). A Nature Conservation Review. Vol. 2. Cambridge, UK: Cambridge University Press. ISBN 978-0-521-21403-2.
- British Red Data Books. Vol. 1–3. Nature Conservancy Council; Joint Nature Conservation Committee. 1977–1999.
