= Knightsbridge Lane =

Protected area in Oxfordshire, England

Coordinates: 51.66675°N 1.013833333333°W

- Site of Special Scientific Interest
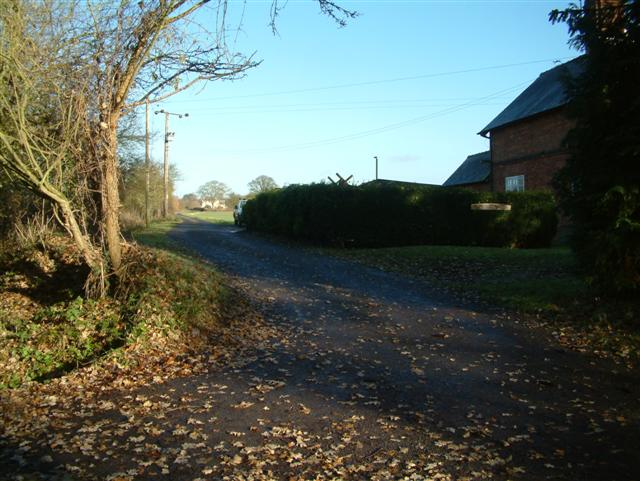
- Location of Knightsbridge Lane.
- Area of search: Oxfordshire
- Grid reference: SU 683 969
- Interest: Biological
- Area: 1.7 hectares (4.2 acres)
- Notification date: 1987
- Location map: Magic Map

Knightsbridge Lane is a 1.7-hectare (4.2-acre) biological Site of Special Scientific Interest just north of Watlington, Oxfordshire.

This site consists of woodland on the sides of a minor road, which has approximately one tenth of the population in the country of a very rare plant, green hound's tongue. It is listed in the British Red Data Book of vascular plants, and it is found at only seven other locations in Britain. The species is often found in disturbed soils, and may have increased following the clearance of dead elm trees.
