= Highlands Farm Pit =

Geological conservation site

- Site of Special Scientific Interest
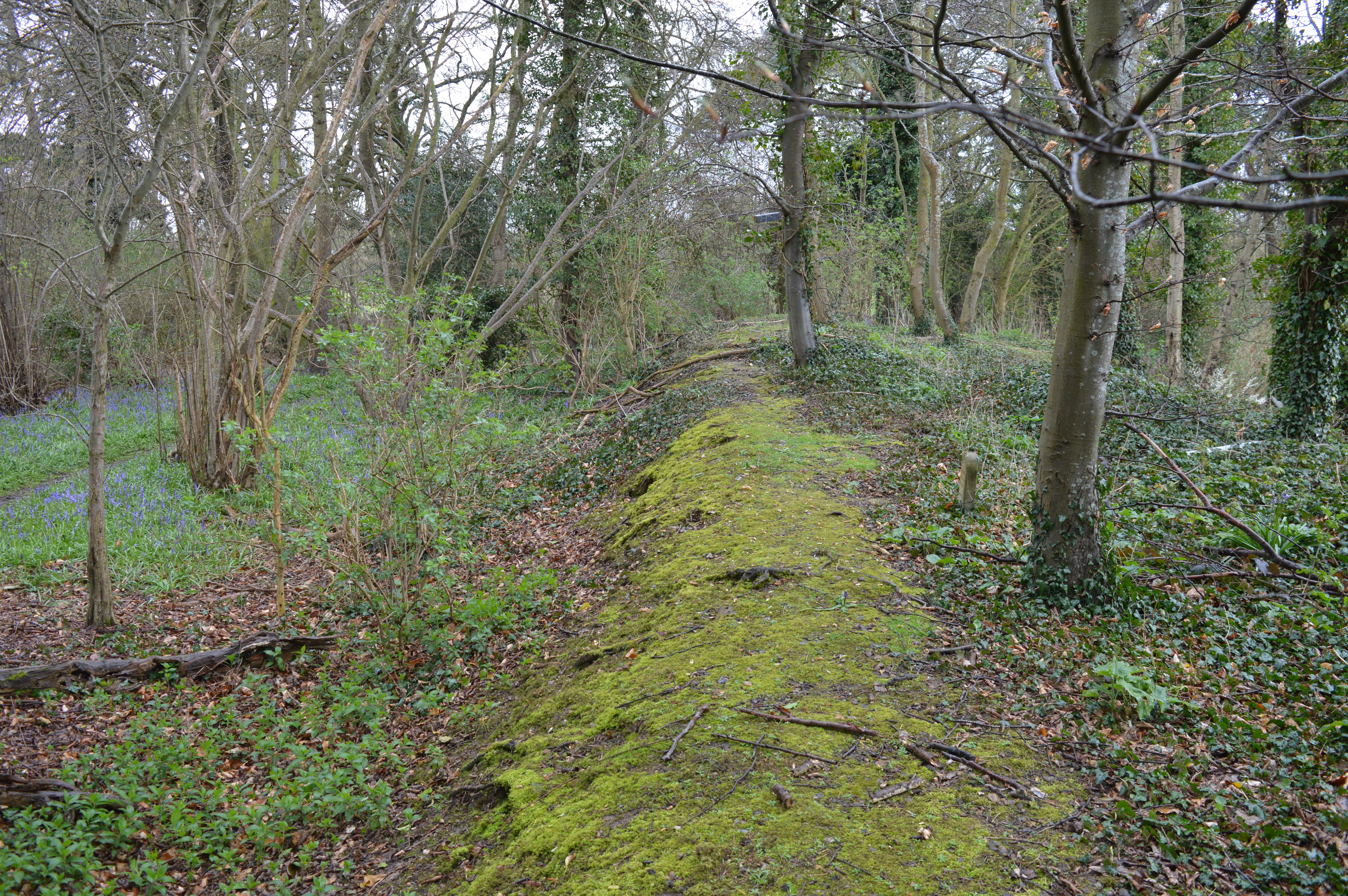
- Location of Highlands Farm Pit.
- Area of search: Oxfordshire
- Grid reference: SU744813
- Coordinates: 51.558718°N 1.488595°W
- Interest: Geological
- Area: 0.6 ha (1.5 acres)
- Notification date: 1986
- Location map: Magic Map

Highlands Farm Pit is a 0.6-hectare (1.5-acre) former gravel pit and now a geological Site of Special Scientific Interest in Henley-on-Thames, Oxfordshire, England. It is a Geological Conservation Review site.

The site exposes gravel from the abandoned channel of the River Thames before the Anglian ice age pushed the river south around 450,000 years ago. It may date to the late Anglian Black Park Terrace which would make it the latest known exposure of the gravel floor of the old channel, and therefore of considerable importance. The site is a long narrow strip of land, and there is a footpath through it from the lane to the farm.

== Palaeolithic finds ==
The site has revealed large quantities of Palaeolithic flints, which are some of the earliest of their type known. It is described by Natural England as a "crucial site". It is one of the most prolific Palaeolithic sites in the United Kingdom, with around 60 artefacts per cubic yard from the Clactonian period. The site was first discovered in 1895. The part of Palaeolithic interest is at the edge of the disused gravel pit, over an area of around 24m × 150m.

== See also ==
- List of Sites of Special Scientific Interest in Oxfordshire
