= Arncott Bridge Meadows =

UK Site of Special Scientific Interest

Coordinates: 51.862224°N 1.11776°W

- Site of Special Scientific Interest
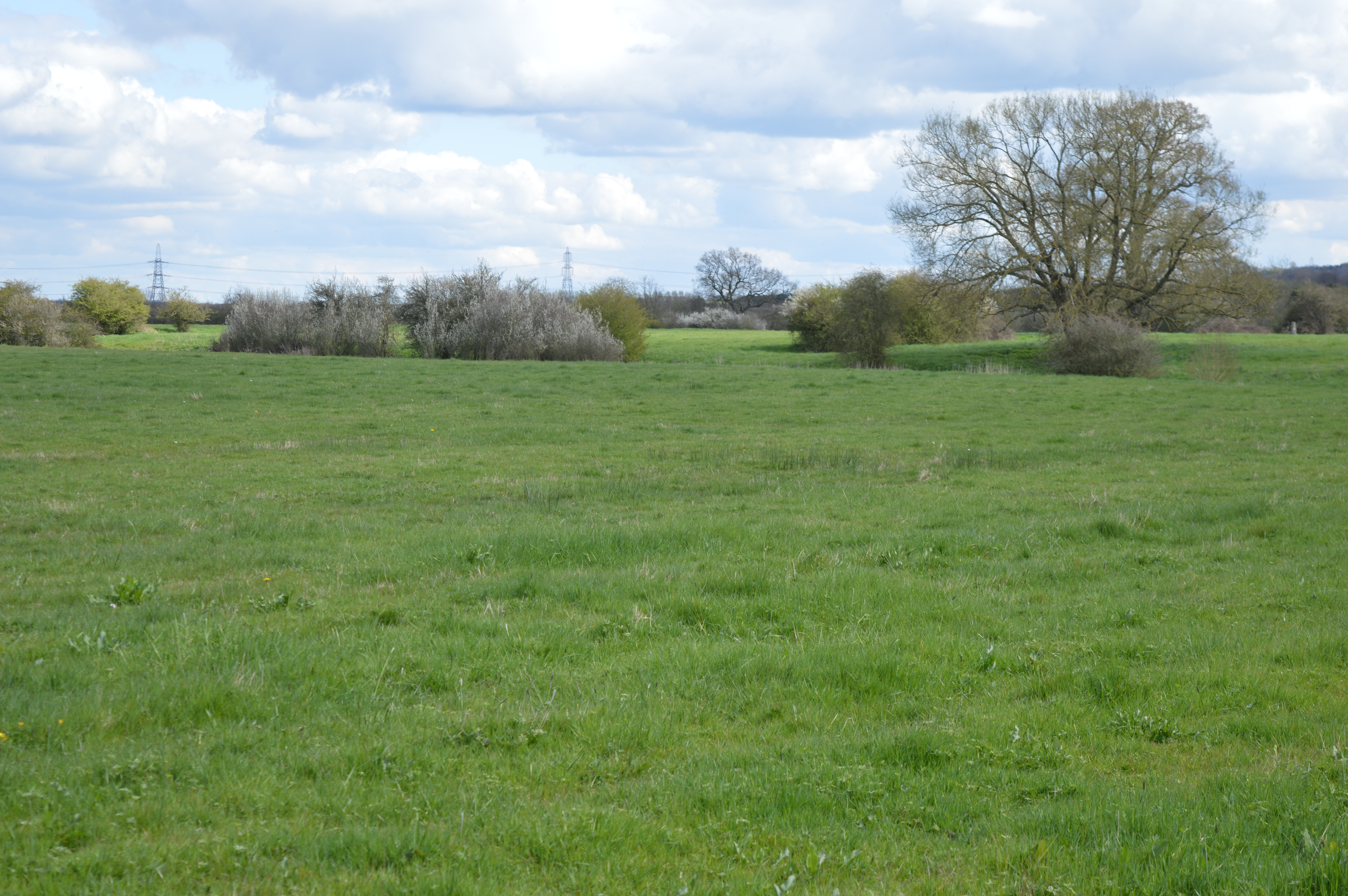
- Location of Arncott Bridge Meadows.
- Area of search: Oxfordshire
- Grid reference: SP608185
- Interest: Biological
- Area: 8.7 ha (21 acres)
- Notification date: 1985
- Location map: Magic Map

Arncott Bridge Meadows is an 8.7-hectare (21-acre) biological Site of Special Scientific Interest in Arncott in Oxfordshire.

The site is adjacent to the River Ray and in its flood plain. It is old unimproved hay meadows which display medieval ridge and furrow features, showing that it has not been ploughed for centuries. It lies on Oxford Clay, and some areas are seasonally waterlogged. It has a wide variety of plants, such as false fox-sedge in wetter areas, and crested dog's-tail in drier ones. There are some rare species, such as the nationally uncommon narrow-leaved water-dropwort, and the river bank also has unusual plants.

The site is private land with no public access, but it can be viewed from Ploughley Road.
