= Moulsford Downs =

Protected area in Oxfordshire, England

Coordinates: 51.539°N 1.169°W

- Site of Special Scientific Interest
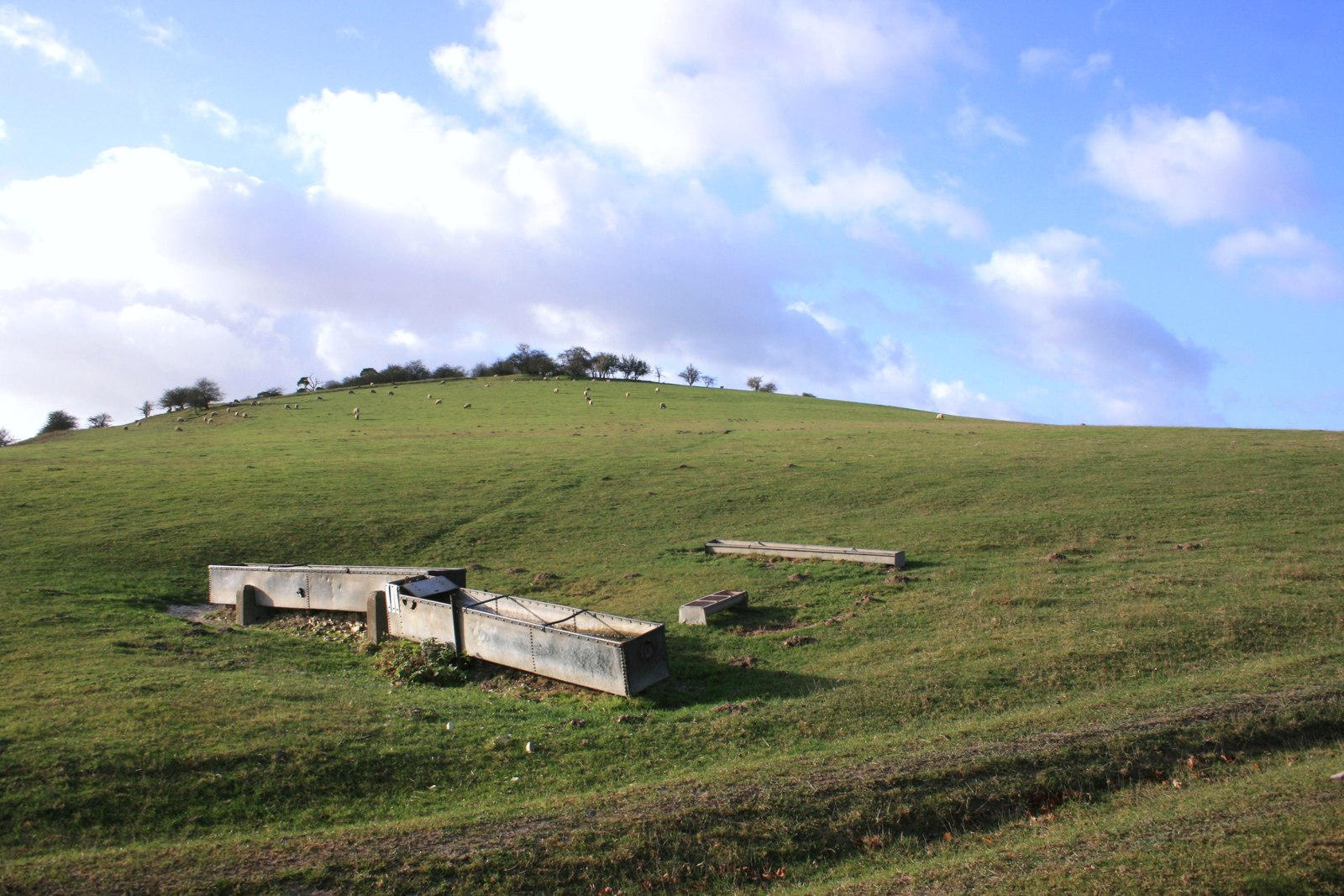
- Location of Moulsford Downs.
- Area of search: Oxfordshire
- Grid reference: SU 577 826
- Interest: Biological
- Area: 13.6 hectares (34 acres)
- Notification date: 1986
- Location map: Magic Map

Moulsford Downs is a 13.6-hectare (34-acre) biological Site of Special Scientific Interest north-west of Goring-on-Thames in Oxfordshire.

This chalk grassland site on the Berkshire Downs has a rich wildlife. The diverse invertebrate fauna includes the uncommon robber-fly Leptarthrus brevirostris, the adonis blue butterfly, the juniper shield bug, the weevils Baris picicornis and seed beetle Phyllobius viridicollis, the leaf beetle Phyllotreta nodicornis and the Bruchus cisti.

The site is private land with no public access.
