= Aston Upthorpe Downs =

Protected area in Oxfordshire, England

Coordinates: 51.548°N 1.218°W

- Site of Special Scientific Interest
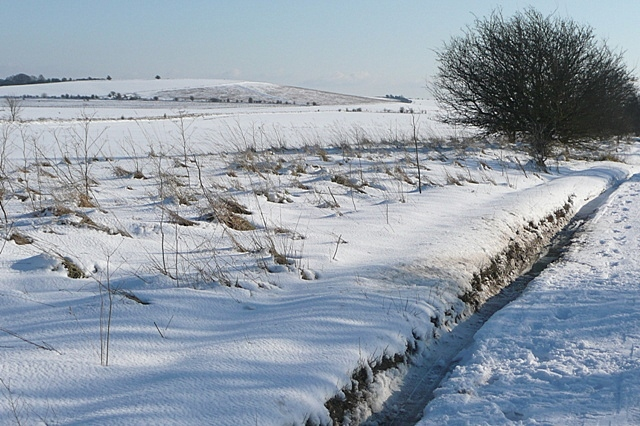
- Location of Aston Upthorpe Downs.
- Area of search: Oxfordshire
- Grid reference: SU 543 835
- Interest: Biological
- Area: 38.5 hectares (95 acres)
- Notification date: 1992
- Location map: Magic Map

Aston Upthorpe Downs is a 38.5-hectare (95-acre) biological Site of Special Scientific Interest south of Aston Upthorpe in Oxfordshire. It is a Nature Conservation Review site, Grade I.

This site is a set of dry valleys in the Berkshire Downs. Most of it is chalk grassland which has a rich variety of flora and fauna, and there are also areas of mixed woodland and juniper scrub. Flora include the nationally uncommon wild candytuft and the only population in the county of the rare pasque flower.
