= Out Wood =

Woodland in Oxfordshire, England

Coordinates: 51.883°N 1.410°W

- Site of Special Scientific Interest
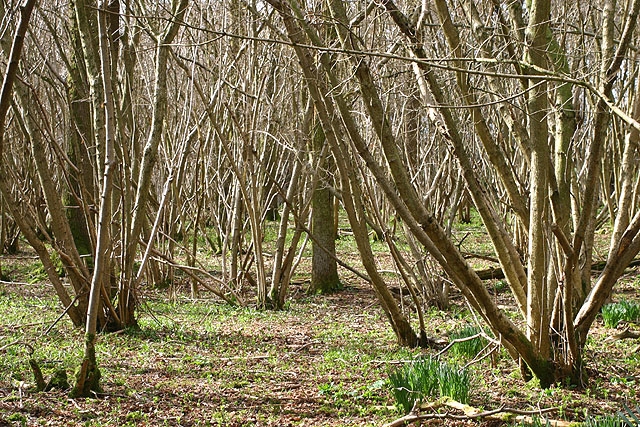
- Location of Out Wood.
- Area of search: Oxfordshire
- Grid reference: SP 407 207
- Interest: Biological
- Area: 19.2 hectares (47 acres)
- Notification date: 1986
- Location map: Magic Map

Out Wood is a 19.2-hectare (47-acre) biological Site of Special Scientific Interest east of Charlbury in Oxfordshire.

This semi-natural wood is a surviving fragment of the medieval Royal Forest of Wychwood. It is an overgrown coppice with standards, and the standards are oaks between 30 and 150 years old. Rides have a diverse ground flora, including meadow saffron, broad-leaved helleborine and greater butterfly orchid.
