= Wytham Ditches and Flushes =

Protected area in Oxfordshire, England

Coordinates: 51.785°N 1.327°W

- Site of Special Scientific Interest
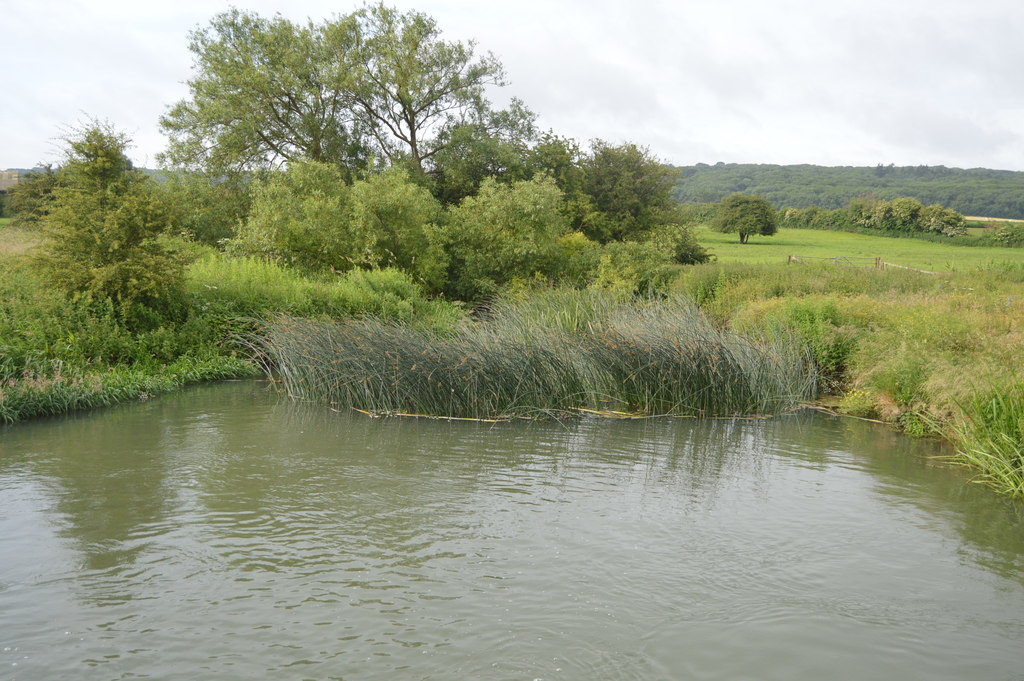
- Location of Wytham Ditches and Flushes.
- Area of search: Oxfordshire
- Grid reference: SP 465 098
- Interest: Biological
- Area: 2.7 hectares (6.7 acres)
- Notification date: 1986
- Location map: Magic Map

Wytham Ditches and Flushes is a 2.7-hectare (6.7-acre) biological Site of Special Scientific Interest north of Oxford in Oxfordshire.

These ditches have a rich aquatic and fen flora. Uncommon wetland plants include greater water-parsnip, greater spearwort, water violet, brookweed, narrow-leaved water plantain and creeping jenny. There is also a small tussocky field which is kept partly waterlogged by flushes.
