= Pixey and Yarnton Meads =

Protected area in Oxfordshire, England

Coordinates: 51.788°N 1.308°W

- Site of Special Scientific Interest
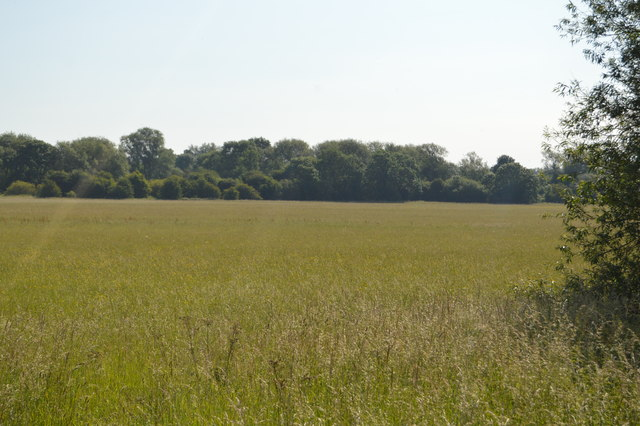
- Location of Pixey and Yarnton Meads.
- Area of search: Oxfordshire
- Grid reference: SP 478 102
- Interest: Biological
- Area: 86.4 hectares (213 acres)
- Notification date: 1986
- Location map: Magic Map

Pixey and Yarnton Meads is an 86.4-hectare (213-acre) biological Site of Special Scientific Interest north of Oxford in Oxfordshire. It is a Nature Conservation Review site, Grade I, and part of Oxford Meadows Special Area of Conservation.

These are unimproved flood meadows on the bank of the River Thames. Their management is very well recorded, and it is known that they have been grazed and cut for hay for more than a thousand years, with the result that they are botanically rich, with more than 150 species. The site has been the subject of detailed botanical and hydrological research.
