= Tuckmill Meadows =

Local nature reserve in Oxfordshire, England

Coordinates: 51.607°N 1.656°W

- Type: Local Nature Reserve and Site of Special Scientific Interest
- Location: Between Shrivenham and Watchfield, Oxfordshire
- OS grid: SU 239 899
- Area: 5.69 hectares (14.1 acres)
- Created: SSSI: March 2, 1988; 38 years ago; Local Nature Reserve: May 16, 1991; 35 years ago
- Manager: Earth Trust

Tuckmill Meadows is a 5.69-hectare (14.1-acre) Local Nature Reserve and Site of Special Scientific Interest between Shrivenham and Watchfield in Oxfordshire. It is owned by Vale of White Horse District Council and managed by Berkshire, Buckinghamshire & Oxfordshire Wildlife Trust.

== Description ==
The site consists of an L-shaped meadow through which the Ratcoombe Brook flows and a small woodland copse. The higher slopes of the meadow are wildflower-rich grassland.

== Natural history ==
Tuckmill Meadows has over 300 recorded plant species, including cowslips and southern marsh orchids. Animal species include otters, badgers, warblers and other birds, rare insects, and dragonflies.

== History ==
The site is named after Tuckmill, a former watermill in Watchfield, and was shaped by centuries of farming and milling creating floodplains along the River Cole. It was declared a Site of Special Scientific Interest in 1988 and a Local Nature Reserve in 1991. Since 2024 it has been managed by Earth Trust.
