= Reed Hill, Oxfordshire =

Protected area in Oxfordshire, England

Coordinates: 51.584°N 1.450°W

Reed Hill
- Site of Special Scientific Interest
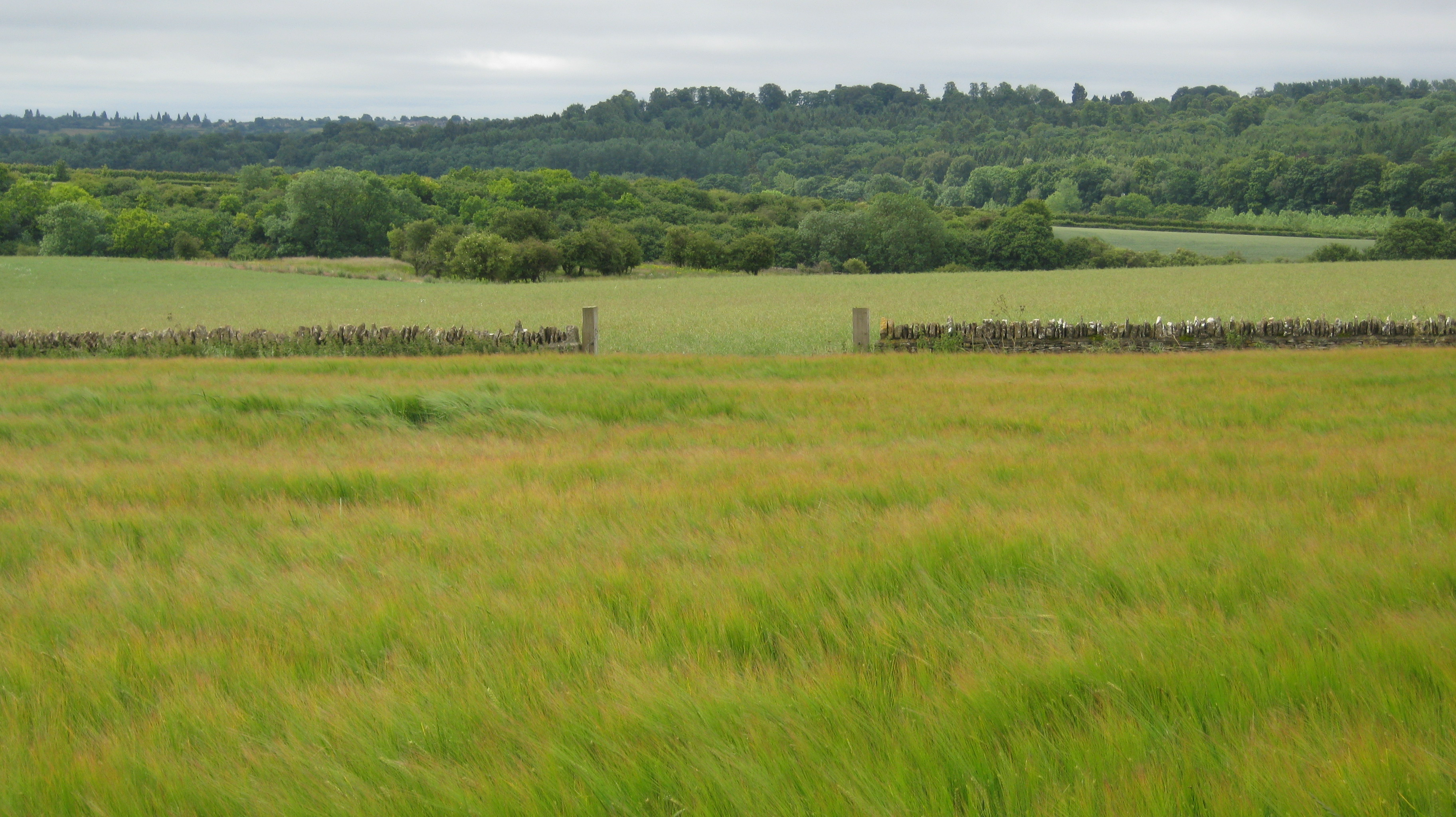
- Location of Reed Hill.
- Area of search: Oxfordshire
- Grid reference: SP 380 174
- Interest: Biological
- Area: 14.0 hectares (35 acres)
- Notification date: 1987
- Location map: Magic Map

Reed Hill is a 14-hectare (35-acre) biological Site of Special Scientific Interest (SSSI) west of Stonesfield in Oxfordshire. It partly overlaps Stonesfield Slate Mines SSSI.

This sheltered dry valley has unimproved limestone grassland, secondary woodland and scrub. A spring at the northern end makes the ground there seasonally damp. Invertebrates include the small blue, Duke of Burgundy and dark green fritillary butterflies, the small shield bug Neotti-glossa pusilla, the beetle Oedemera lurida and the spider Hypsosinga pygmaea.
