= Berrick Trench =

Coordinates: 51.588°N 0.984°W

- Site of Special Scientific Interest
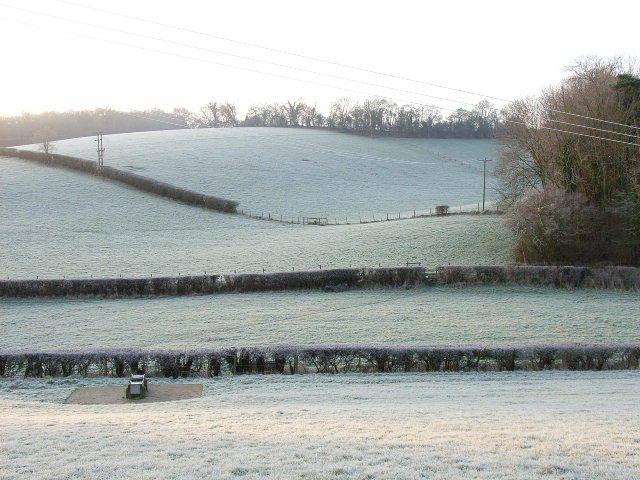
- Location of Berrick Trench.
- Area of search: Oxfordshire
- Grid reference: SU 705 882
- Interest: Biological
- Area: 2.1 hectares (5.2 acres)
- Notification date: 1988
- Location map: Magic Map

Berrick Trench is a 2.1-hectare (5.2-acre) biological Site of Special Scientific Interest north of Nettlebed in Oxfordshire.

This is an ancient semi-natural beech wood on the slope of a dry valley in the Upper Chalk. There are many stools of ash, oak, beech, whitebeam, field maple and hazel. Woodland flowering plants include early purple orchid and early dog-violet.
