= Lyehill Quarry =

Quarry in Oxfordshire, England

- Site of Special Scientific Interest
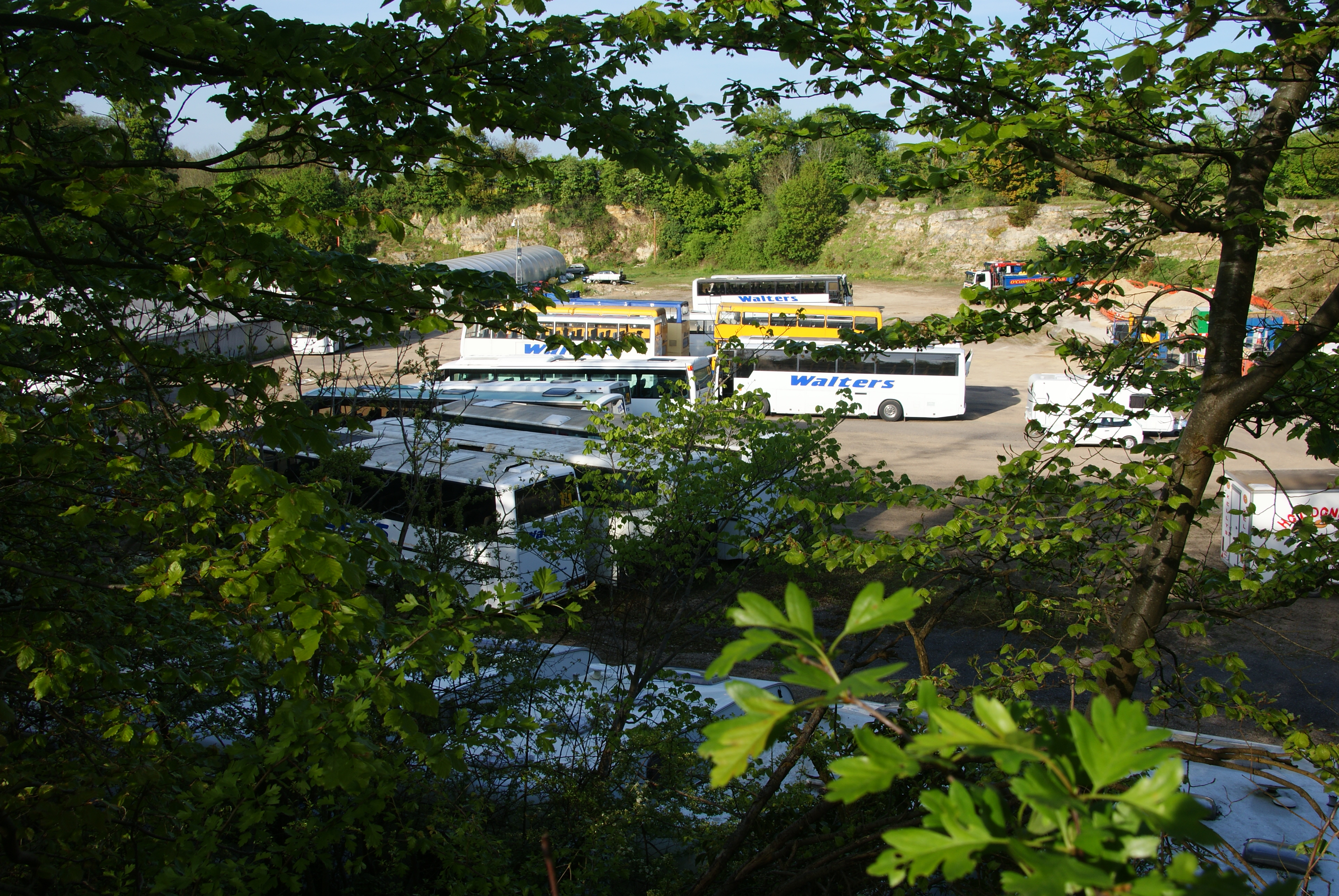
- Location of Lyehill Quarry.
- Area of search: Oxfordshire
- Grid reference: SP 592 068
- Coordinates: 51.757°N 1.144°W
- Interest: Geological
- Area: 2.8 hectares (6.9 acres)
- Notification date: 1986
- Location map: Magic Map

Lyehill Quarry is a 2.8-hectare (6.9-acre) former quarry and geological Site of Special Scientific Interest east of Oxford in Oxfordshire, England. It is a Geological Conservation Review site.

This disused quarry exposes rocks dating to the Wheatley Limestone member of the Stanford Formation, approximately 160 million years ago during the Middle Jurassic. The deposits are limestones in an unstable reef substrate, and the only fossils are of oysters.

The site is private land with no public access.
