= Salt Way, Ditchley =

Site of Special Scientific Interest in Oxfordshire, England

Coordinates: 51.873°N 1.444°W

- Site of Special Scientific Interest
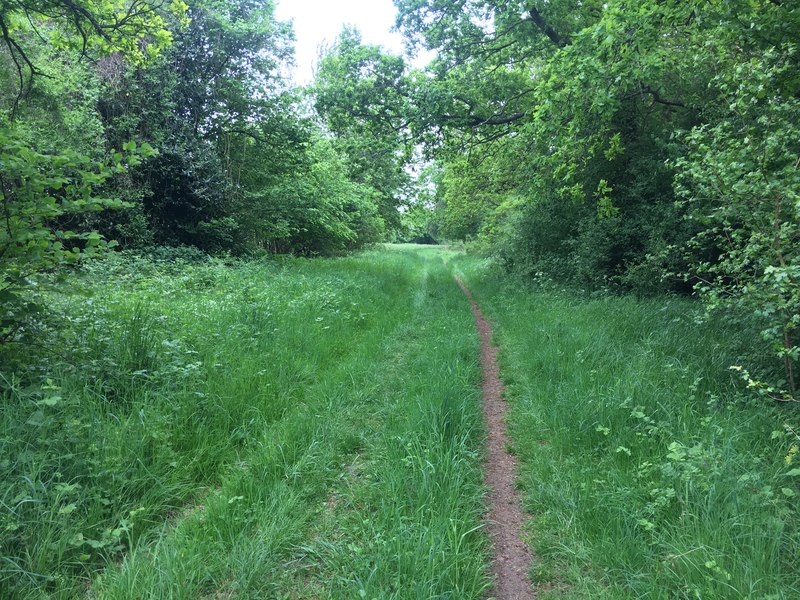
- Location of Salt Way, Ditchley.
- Area of search: Oxfordshire
- Grid reference: SP 384 195
- Interest: Biological
- Area: 2.0 hectares (4.9 acres)
- Notification date: 1988
- Location map: Magic Map

Salt Way, Ditchley is a 2-hectare (4.9-acre) biological Site of Special Scientific Interest (SSSI) east of Charlbury in Oxfordshire. It is also a Local Nature Reserve.

This is a stretch of an ancient track together with its species-rich grass verges and hedges. It has been designated an SSSI because it has the largest known British colony of the very rare downy woundwort, with more than 100 seedlings and 60 flowering stems. The plant is associated with hedges along Roman roads and ancient tracks on calcareous soils, and Salt Way may date to the Roman period.
