= Swyncombe Downs =

Protected area in Oxfordshire, England

Coordinates: 51.615°N 1.025°W

- Site of Special Scientific Interest
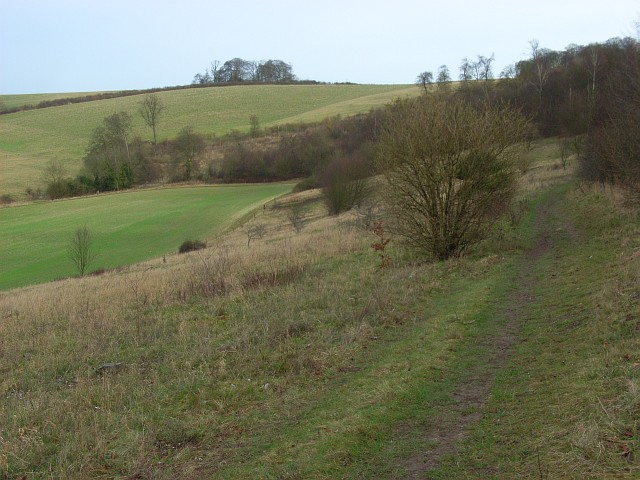
- Location of Swyncombe Downs.
- Area of search: Oxfordshire
- Grid reference: SU 676 911
- Interest: Biological
- Area: 47.1 hectares (116 acres)
- Notification date: 1984
- Location map: Magic Map

Swyncombe Downs is a 47.1-hectare (116-acre) biological Site of Special Scientific Interest east of Wallingford in Oxfordshire.

This is an area of chalk grassland and scrub on the steep slopes of the Chiltern Hills. The site is described by Natural England as outstanding for its butterflies and moths. Butterflies include the silver-spotted skipper, which is nationally rare, grizzled skipper and dark green fritillary. There are day flying moths such as the cistus forester, chimney sweeper and wood tiger.
