= Sturt Copse =

Coordinates: 51.832°N 1.422°W

- Site of Special Scientific Interest
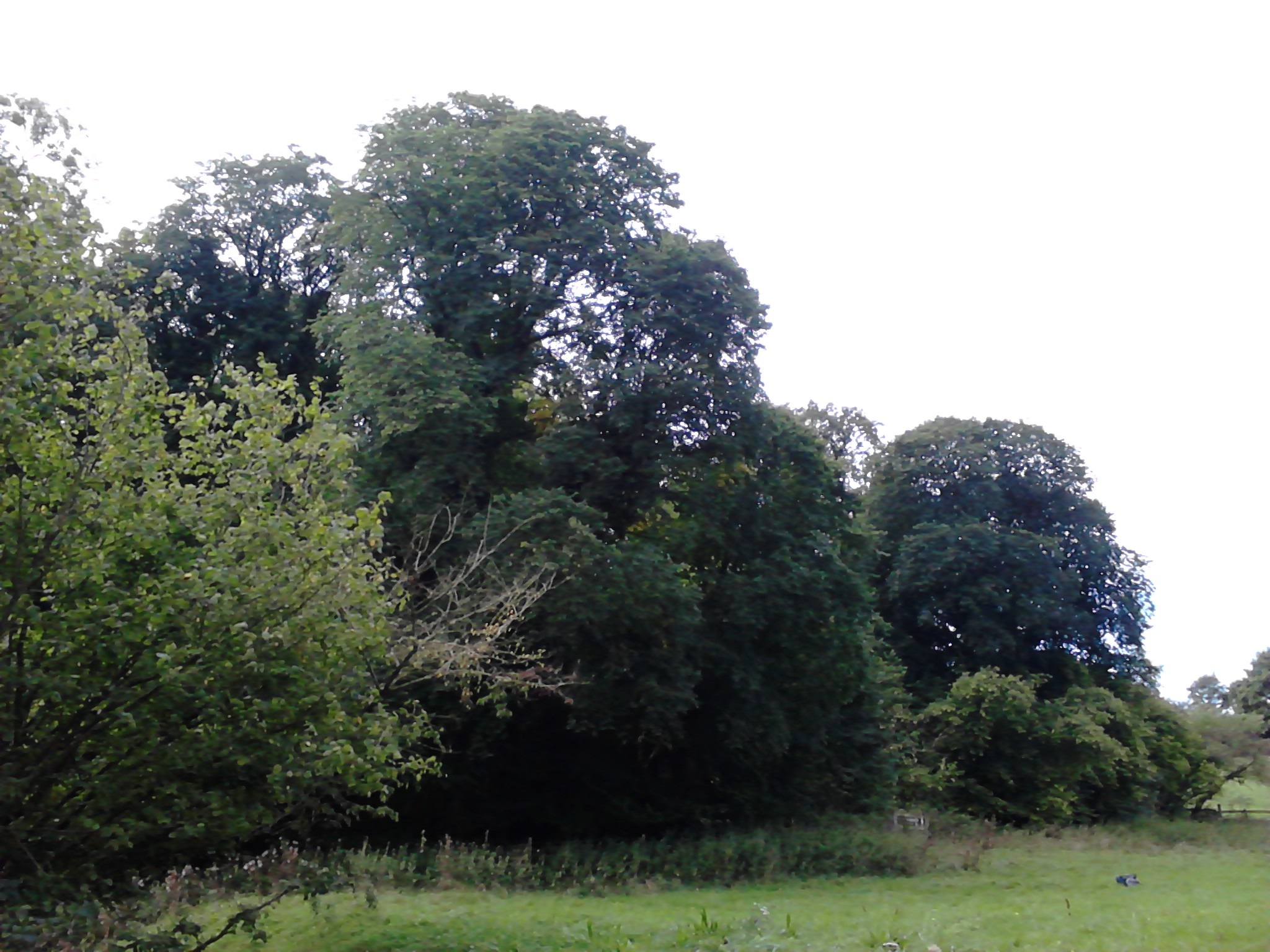
- Location of Sturt Copse.
- Area of search: Oxfordshire
- Grid reference: SP 399 150
- Interest: Biological
- Area: 6.5 hectares (16 acres)
- Notification date: 1987
- Location map: Magic Map

Sturt Copse is a 6.5-hectare (16-acre) biological Site of Special Scientific Interest north-west of Oxford in Oxfordshire.

This wood has many giant stools of coppiced of ash and wych elm trees, together with oaks, some of them pollarded. Most of the ground layer is dominated by dog's mercury, and there are uncommon plants such as yellow star-of-Bethlehem, Lathraea squamaria and hard shield-fern.
