= Shipton-on-Cherwell and Whitehill Farm Quarries =

Protected area in Oxfordshire, England

- Site of Special Scientific Interest
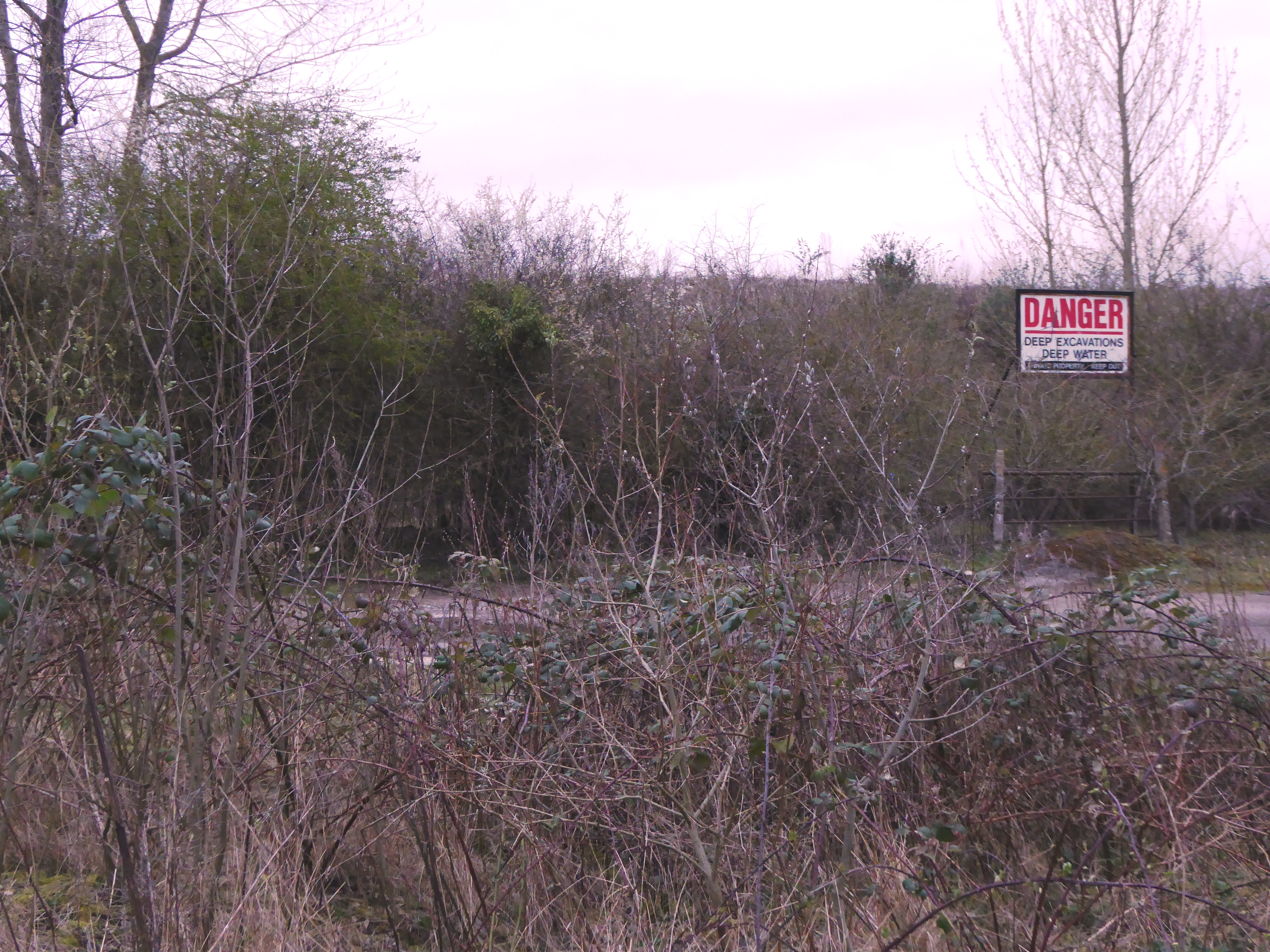
- Location of Shipton-on-Cherwell and Whitehill Farm Quarries.
- Area of search: Oxfordshire
- Grid reference: SP 477 173
- Coordinates: 51.852°N 1.309°W
- Interest: Geological
- Area: 30.0 hectares (74 acres)
- Notification date: 1995
- Location map: Magic Map

Shipton-on-Cherwell and Whitehill Farm Quarries is a 30-hectare (74-acre) geological Site of Special Scientific Interest consisting of formar quarries, located north of Kidlington in Oxfordshire, England. It is a Geological Conservation Review site.

This site exposes a lithostratigraphic succession dating to the Bathonian stage of the Middle Jurassic, around 167 million years ago. Shipton-on-Cherwell Quarry is described by Natural England as "of international importance as one of the best Upper Bathonian reptile sites known", and it has yielded type material for two species of crocodile. The quarry has also produced the type specimen of the dinosaur Dacentrurus vetustus.

The site is private land with no public access.
