= Neithrop Fields Cutting =

Protected area in Oxfordshire, England

Coordinates: 52.074°N 1.362°W

- Site of Special Scientific Interest
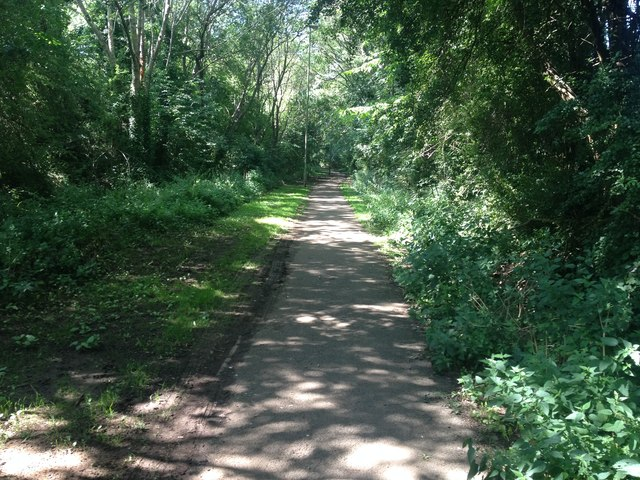
- Location of Neithrop Fields Cutting.
- Area of search: Oxfordshire
- Grid reference: SP 438 419
- Interest: Geological
- Area: 1.4 hectares (3.5 acres)
- Notification date: 1986
- Location map: Magic Map

Neithrop Fields Cutting is a 1.4-hectare (3.5-acre) geological Site of Special Scientific Interest in Banbury in Oxfordshire. It is a Geological Conservation Review site.

This site exhibits sections dating to the Early Jurassic around 190 to 180 million years ago. Its Middle Lias sediments show that it was adjacent to the "London landmass", which was then an island. The Upper Lias have a section rich in fossil ammonites. Natural England describes the site as a "key palaeogeographic and stratigraphic locality".

The Banbury Fringe Walk runs through the site.
