= Otmoor SSSI =

Protected area in Oxfordshire, England

Coordinates: 51.820°N 1.169°W

Otmoor
- Site of Special Scientific Interest
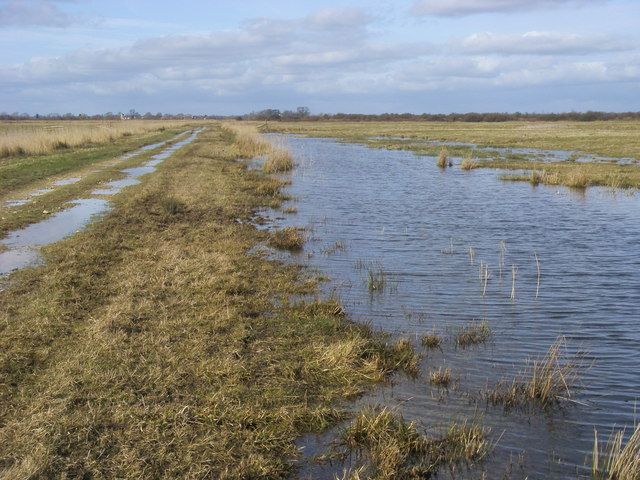
- Location of Otmoor.
- Area of search: Oxfordshire
- Grid reference: SP 574 138
- Interest: Biological
- Area: 213.0 hectares (526 acres)
- Notification date: 1988
- Location map: Magic Map

Otmoor SSSI is a 213-hectare (530-acre) biological Site of Special Scientific Interest north of Oxford in Oxfordshire. It is adjacent to RSPB Otmoor, and they are both part of Otmoor, an area of wetland and wet grassland which was enclosed in the early nineteenth century.

This site in the floodplain of the River Ray has herb-rich damp grassland, wet sedge, coarse grassland, woodland, pools and ditches. More than sixty species of bird breed on the site, such as curlew and lapwing, while wintering birds include teal, wigeon, snipe, golden plover and short-eared owl.

Much of the site is owned by the Ministry of Defence as a firing range and is closed to the public.
