= Littlemore Railway Cutting =

Protected area in Oxfordshire, England

Coordinates: 51.721°N 1.234°W

- Site of Special Scientific Interest
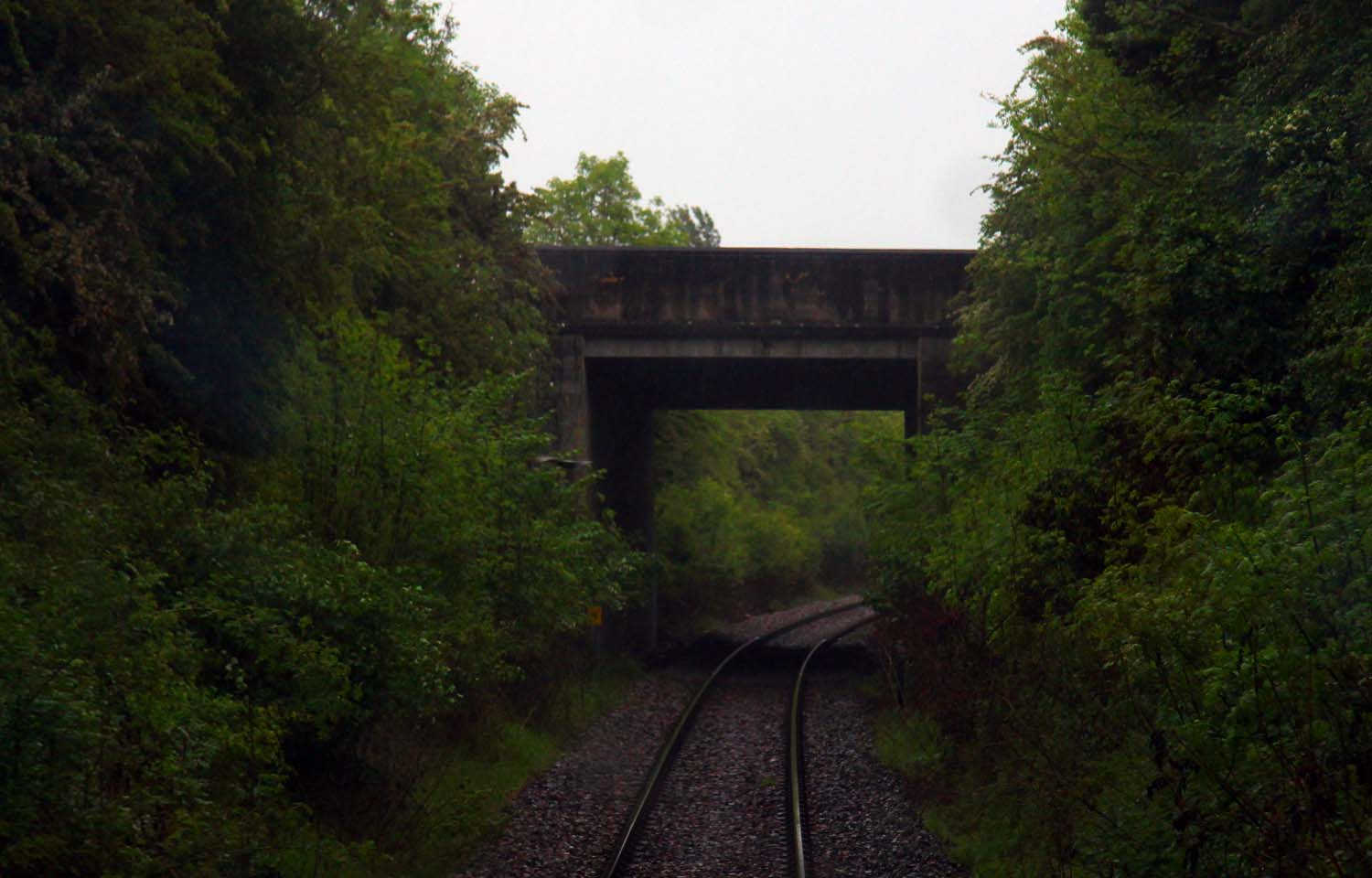
- Location of Littlemore Railway Cutting.
- Area of search: Oxfordshire
- Grid reference: SP 530 027
- Interest: Geological
- Area: 0.5 hectares (1.2 acres)
- Notification date: 1986
- Location map: Magic Map

Littlemore Railway Cutting is a 0.5-hectare (1.2-acre) geological Site of Special Scientific Interest on the southern outskirts of Oxford in Oxfordshire. It is a Geological Conservation Review site.

The cutting exposes limestone and clay laid down in mid-Oxfordian stage of the Late Jurassic, around 160 million years ago. The deposit is part of the Stanford Formation, and the clay appears to have been deposited in a channel between coral reefs which then covered the Oxford area.
