= Pishill Woods =

Biological sight of Special Scientific Interest

Coordinates: 51.606°N 0.972°W

- Site of Special Scientific Interest
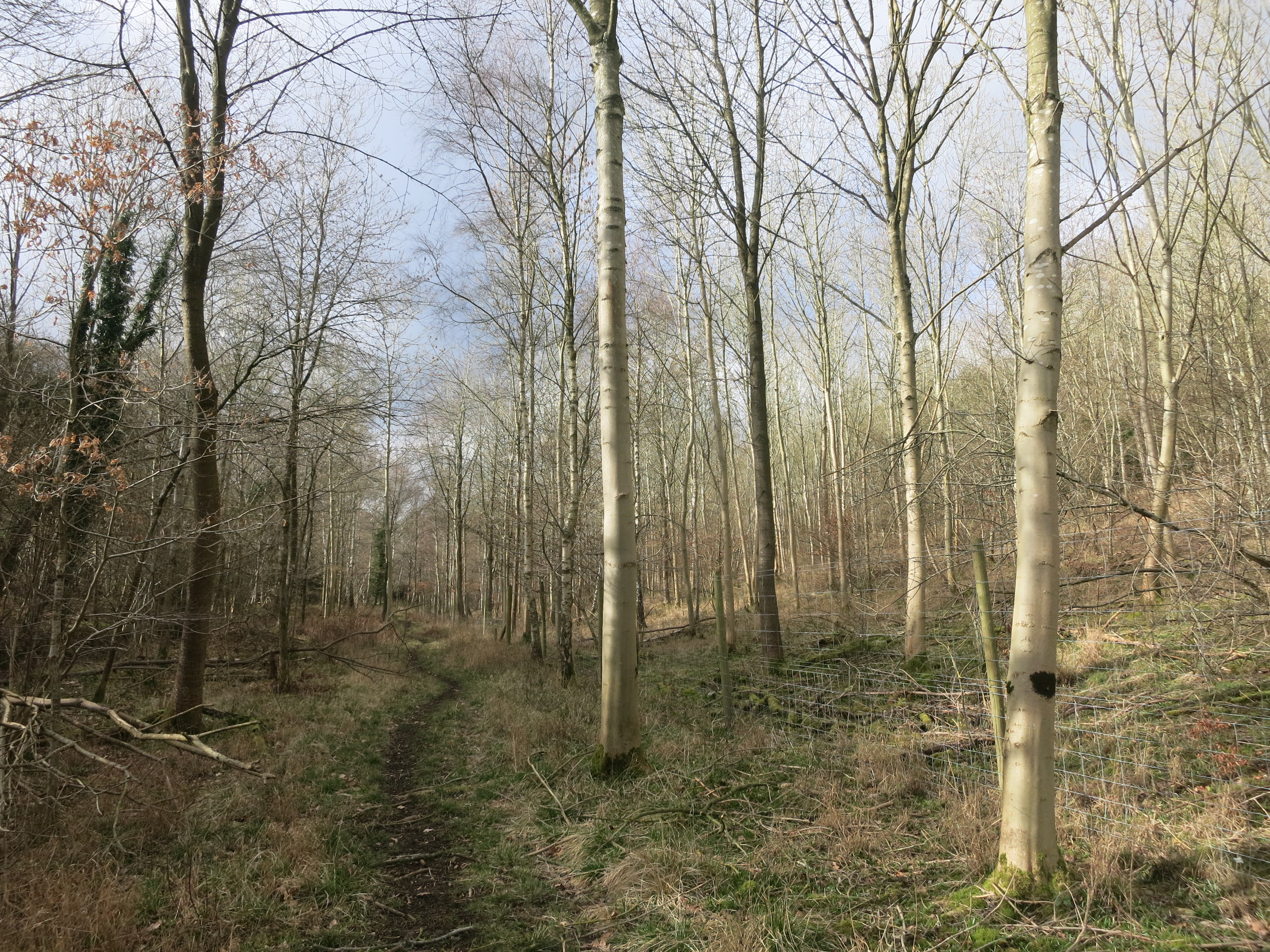
- Location of Pishill Woods.
- Area of search: Oxfordshire
- Grid reference: SU 713 902
- Interest: Biological
- Area: 42.8 hectares (106 acres)
- Notification date: 1992
- Location map: Magic Map

Pishill Woods is a 42.8-hectare (106-acre) biological Site of Special Scientific Interest north of Nettlebed in Oxfordshire.

These semi-natural woods have a rich ground flora, including 35 species associated with ancient woodland. The southern part is dominated by beech and oak coppice, whereas the north, which has been managed as high forest, has mainly mature beech trees, with smaller numbers of oak, ash, cherry, whitebeam, yew and wych elm. The southern part is common land.
