= Wendlebury Meads and Mansmoor Closes =

Protected area in Oxfordshire, England

Coordinates: 51.853715°N 1.184715°W

- Site of Special Scientific Interest
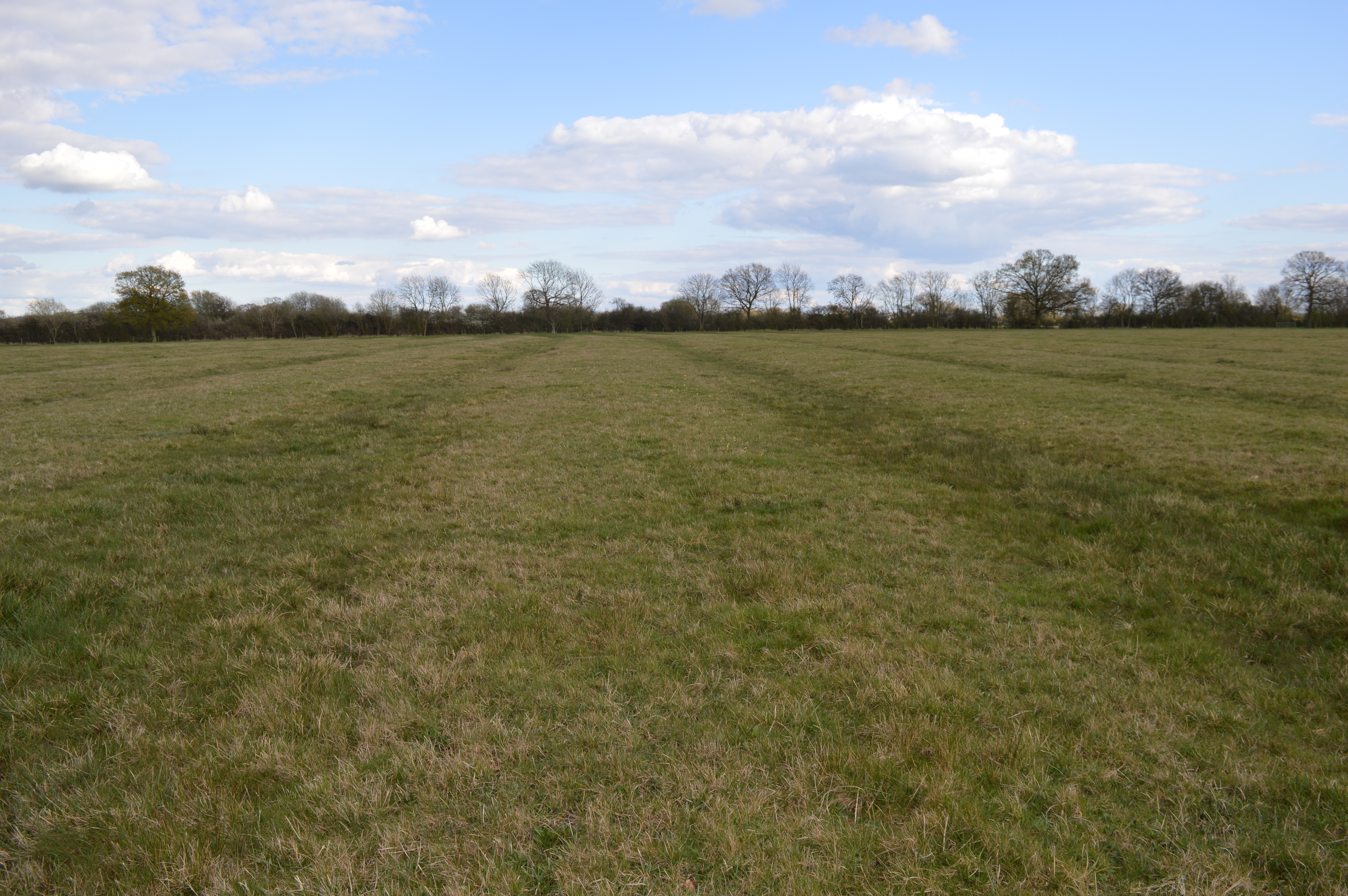
- Medieval ridge and furrow on Wendlebury Meads
- Location of Wendlebury Meads and Mansmoor Closes.
- Area of search: Oxfordshire
- Grid reference: SP562175
- Interest: Biological
- Area: 73.2 ha (181 acres)
- Notification date: 1986
- Location map: Magic Map

Wendlebury Meads and Mansmoor Closes is a 73.2-hectare (181-acre) biological Site of Special Scientific Interest south of Wendlebury in Oxfordshire.

Wendlebury Meads consists of several meadows which have been traditionally managed, and have complex and varied flora. Calcareous pastures were common in southern England at the beginning of the twentieth century, and these meadows are among the few have survived agricultural improvements. Almost all show evidence of medieval ridge and furrow ploughing. Mansmoor Closes were enclosed very early, before 1622, and are important from both a landscape and archaeological point of view. More than 160 plant species have been recorded, including 11 of dandelion. There are birds such as snipe and curlew, and many common butterflies.

The site is private land, but it is crossed by a public footpath between Charlton-on-Otmoor and Wendlebury.
