= Shellingford Crossroads Quarry =

Quarry in Oxfordshire, England

- Site of Special Scientific Interest
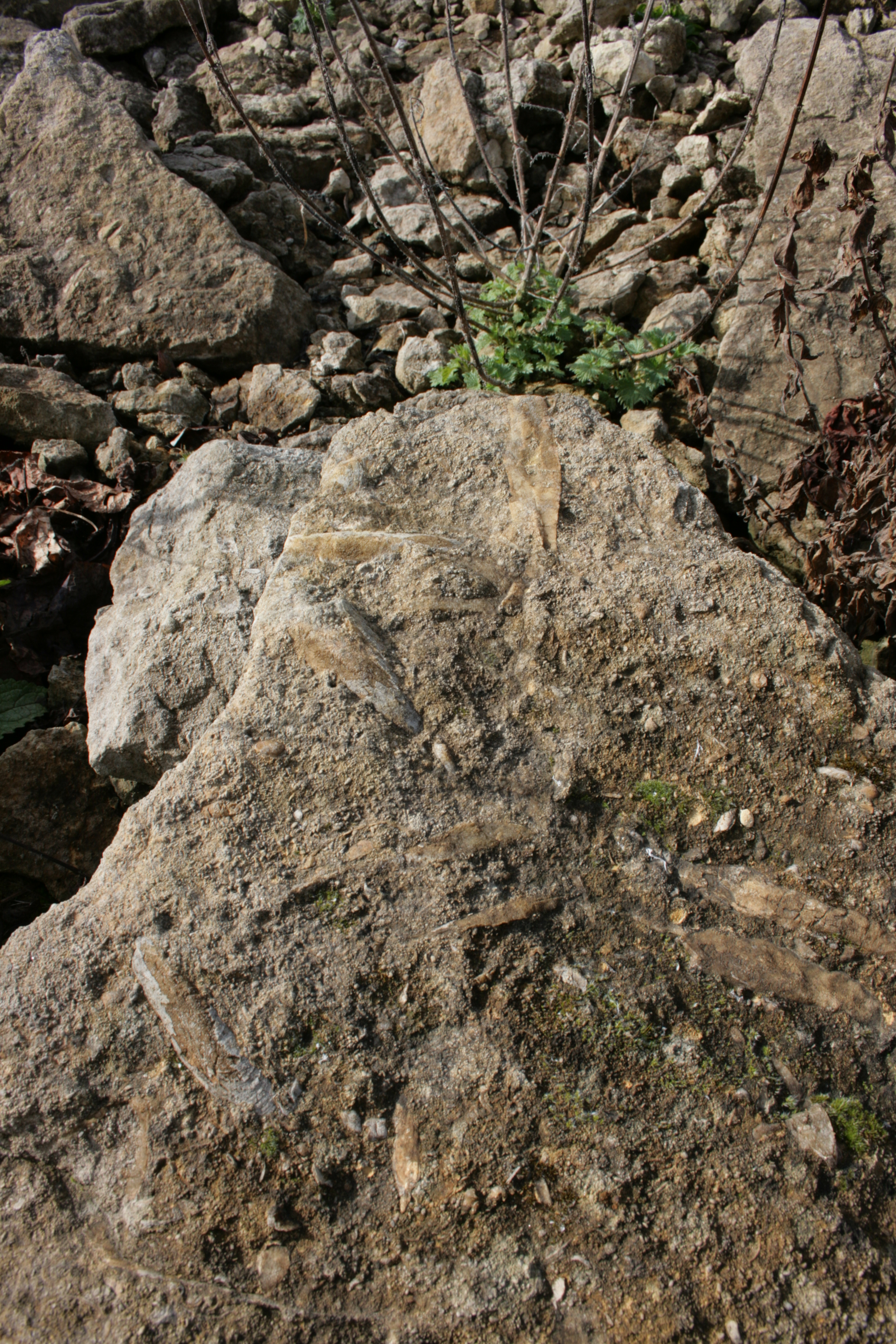
- Location of Shellingford Crossroads Quarry.
- Area of search: Oxfordshire
- Grid reference: SU 326 941
- Coordinates: 51.645°N 1.530°W
- Interest: Geological
- Area: 2.6 hectares (6.4 acres)
- Notification date: 1986
- Location map: Magic Map

Shellingford Crossroads Quarry is a 2.6-hectare (6.4-acre) former quarry and geological Site of Special Scientific Interest west of Stanford in the Vale in Oxfordshire. It is a Geological Conservation Review site.

This site exposes rocks of the Corallian Group, dating to the Oxfordian stage of the Late Jurassic, around 160 million years ago. It has many fossils of corals and reef-dwelling bivalves, and is also important as it provides an example of the complexity of Oxfordian stratigraphy.

== Land ownership ==
All land within Shellingford Crossroads Quarry SSSI is owned by the local authority.
