= Ducklington Mead =

UK Site of Special Scientific Interest

Coordinates: 51.766°N 1.475°W

- Site of Special Scientific Interest
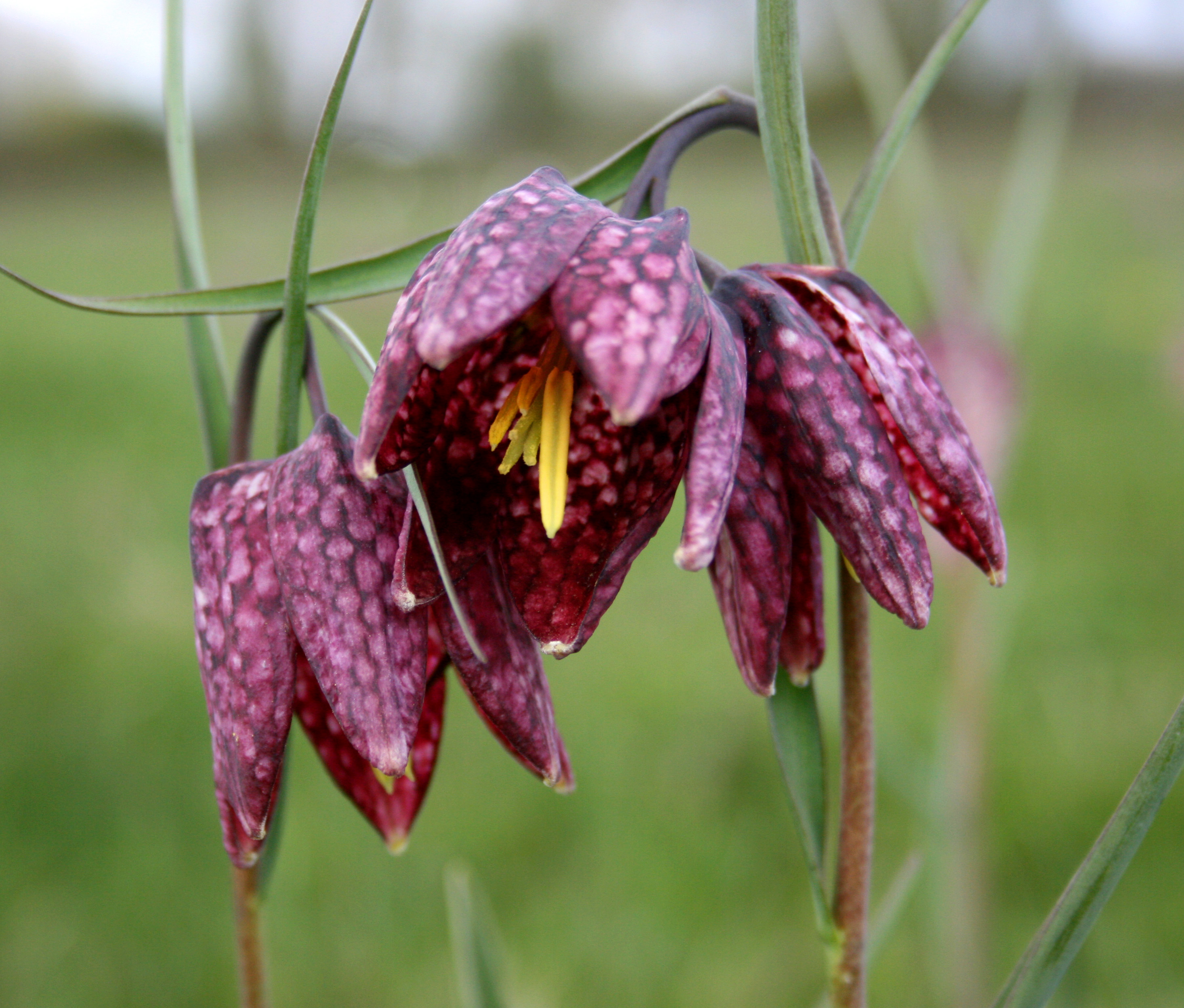
- Snake's head fritillary in Ducklington Mead
- Location of Ducklington Mead.
- Area of search: Oxfordshire
- Grid reference: SP 363 076
- Interest: Biological
- Area: 4.6 hectares (11 acres)
- Notification date: 1986
- Location map: Magic Map

Ducklington Mead is a 4.6-hectare (11-acre) biological Site of Special Scientific Interest east of Ducklington in Oxfordshire.

This traditionally managed meadow has diverse flora, such as the rare and declining snake's-head fritillary. Flowering plants in drier areas include saw-wort, dropwort, lady's bedstraw and betony. There are also ditches with interesting wetland flora and an ancient hedge with a variety of shrubs.

The site is private land with no public access.
