= Wolvercote Meadows =

Protected area in Oxfordshire, England

Coordinates: 51.783°N 1.298°W

- Site of Special Scientific Interest
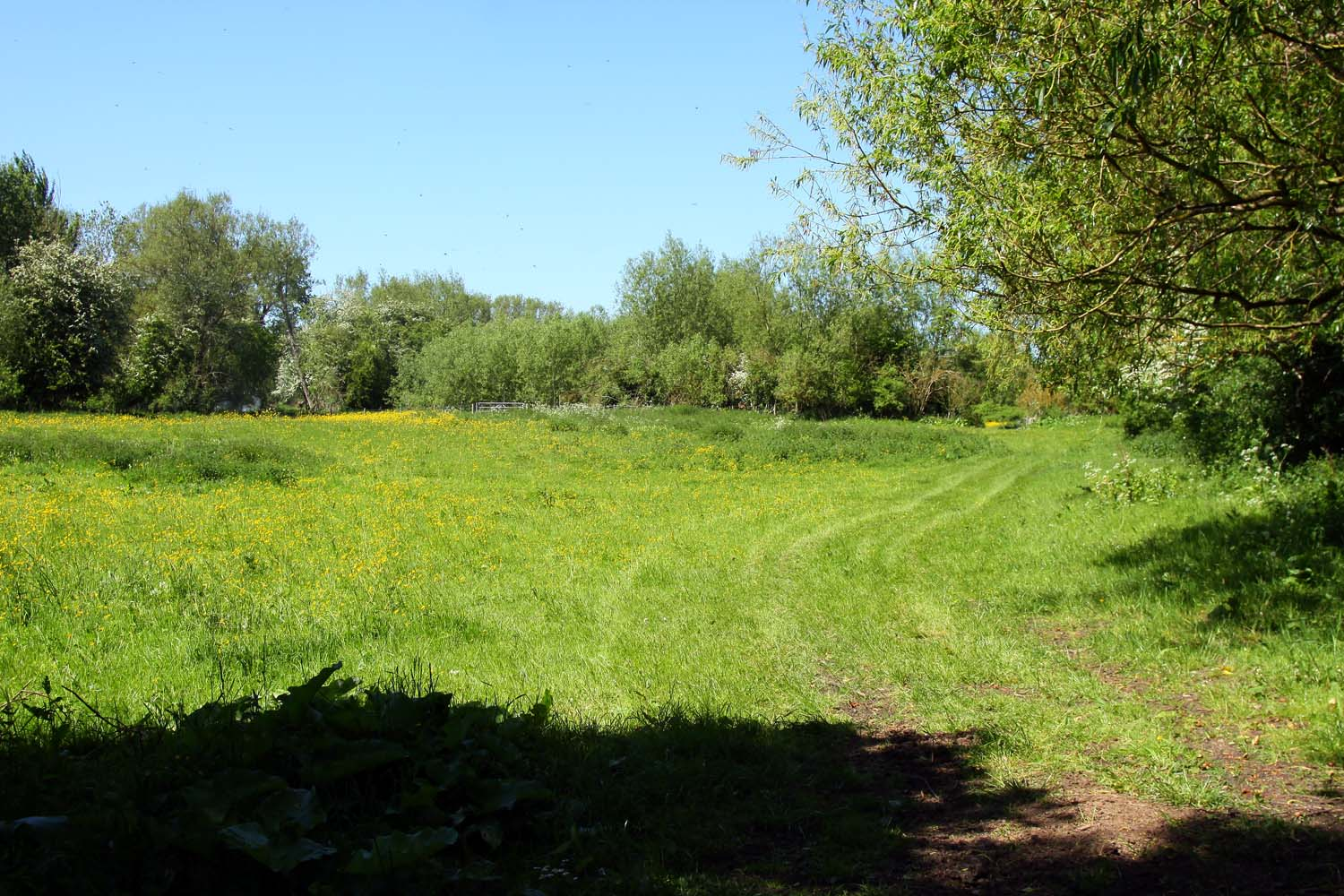
- Location of Wolvercote Meadows.
- Area of search: Oxfordshire
- Grid reference: SP 485 096
- Interest: Biological
- Area: 7.1 hectares (18 acres)
- Notification date: 1986
- Location map: Magic Map

Wolvercote Meadows is a 7.1-hectare (18-acre) biological Site of Special Scientific Interest north of Oxford in Oxfordshire. Part of it is owned by the Oxford Preservation Trust. It is part of Oxford Meadows Special Area of Conservation.

These meadows next to the River Thames are traditionally managed for pasture and hay, and they have a rich flora. The largest, which is called Great Baynham's Meadow, is used as pasture, and the other fields are managed for hay with grazing in the autumn. There are also watercourses which have many dragonflies.
