= Horsehay Quarries =

Protected area in Oxfordshire, England

- Site of Special Scientific Interest
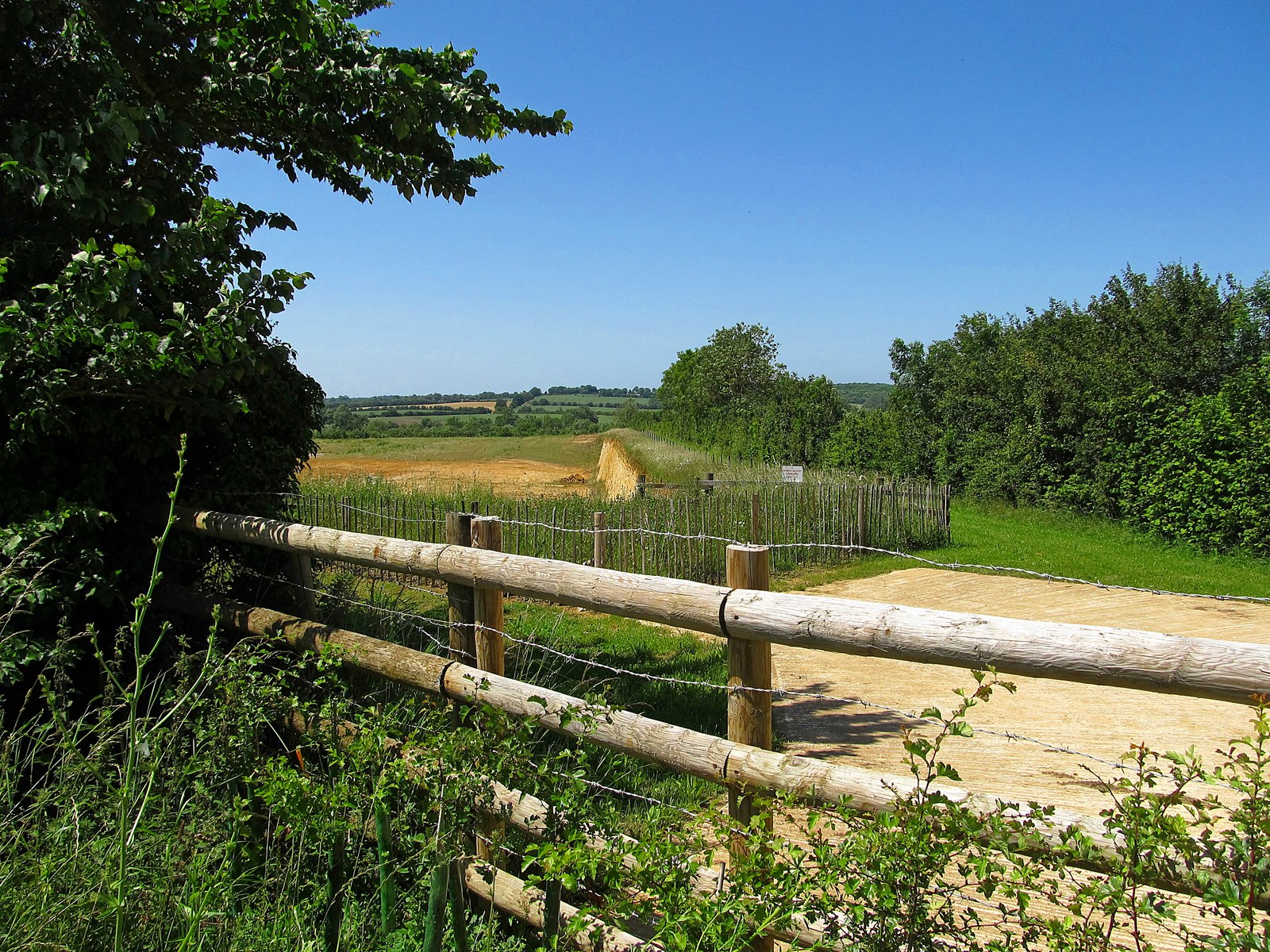
- Location of Horsehay Quarries.
- Area of search: Oxfordshire
- Grid reference: SP 456 272
- Coordinates: 51.941°N 1.338°W
- Interest: Geological
- Area: 8.4 hectares (21 acres)
- Notification date: 1987
- Location map: Magic Map

Horsehay Quarries is a 8.4-hectare (21-acre) former quarry and geological Site of Special Scientific Interest west of Bicester in Oxfordshire, England. It is a Geological Conservation Review site.

These quarries expose rocks dating to the Middle Jurassic period. The sequence runs from the Northampton Sand Formation of the Aalenian about 172 million years ago to the Taynton Limestone Formation of the Middle Bathonian around 167 million years ago.

The site is private land with no public access.
