= Port Meadow with Wolvercote Common and Green =

Protected area in Oxfordshire, England

Coordinates: 51.774°N 1.287°W

- Site of Special Scientific Interest
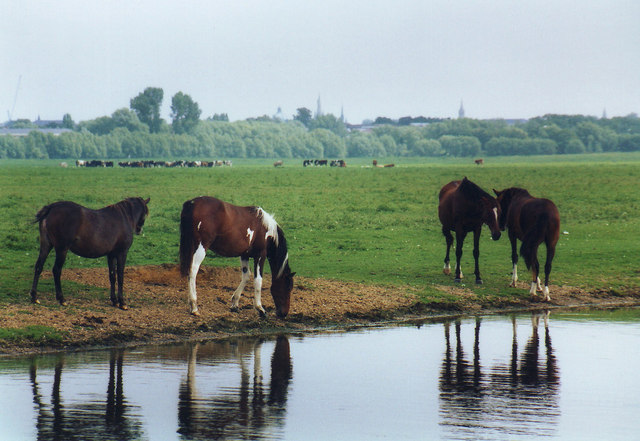
- Location of Port Meadow with Wolvercote Common and Green.
- Area of search: Oxfordshire
- Grid reference: SP 493 086
- Interest: Biological
- Area: 167.1 hectares (413 acres)
- Notification date: 1986
- Location map: Magic Map

Port Meadow with Wolvercote Common and Green is a 167.1-hectare (413-acre) biological Site of Special Scientific Interest in Oxford in Oxfordshire. It is a Nature Conservation Review site, Grade I, and part of Oxford Meadows Special Area of Conservation. The remains of Godstow Abbey, which is a Scheduled Monument, are in the north of the site.

This site consists of meadows in the floodplain of the River Thames. It is thought to have been grazed for over a thousand years and is a classic site for studying the effects of grazing on flora. There is a low diversity compared with neighbouring fields which are cut for hay, but 178 flowering plants have been recorded, including creeping marshwort, which is a Red Data Book species not found anywhere else in Britain.
