= Bear, Oveys and Great Bottom Woods =

UK Site of Special Scientific Interest

Coordinates: 51.544°N 0.995°W

- Site of Special Scientific Interest
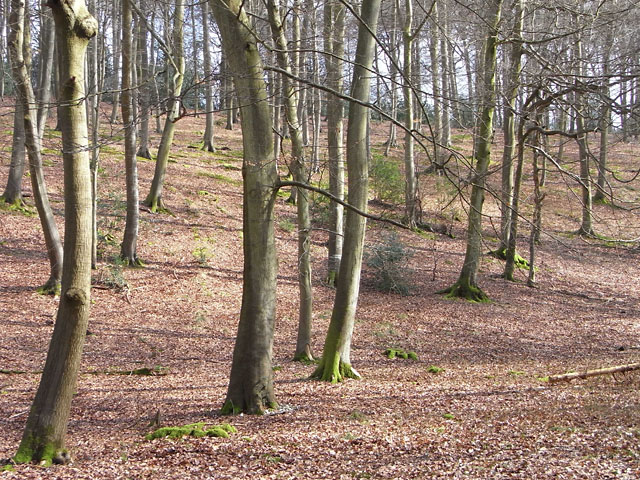
- Location of Bear, Oveys and Great Bottom Woods.
- Area of search: Oxfordshire
- Grid reference: SU 698 833
- Interest: Biological
- Area: 64.1 hectares (158 acres)
- Notification date: 1986
- Location map: Magic Map

Bear, Oveys and Great Bottom Woods is a 64.1-hectare (158-acre) biological Site of Special Scientific Interest west of Henley-on-Thames in Oxfordshire.

This beech woodland has more than 40 species of ground flora which is commonly associated with ancient woods in southern Britain, including broad-leaved helleborine, southern wood-rush, yellow archangel, enchanter's nightshade, goldilocks buttercup, woodruff and the moss Leucobryum glaucum.
