= Rushy Meadows =

Protected area in Oxfordshire, England

Coordinates: 51.824°N 1.303°W

- Site of Special Scientific Interest
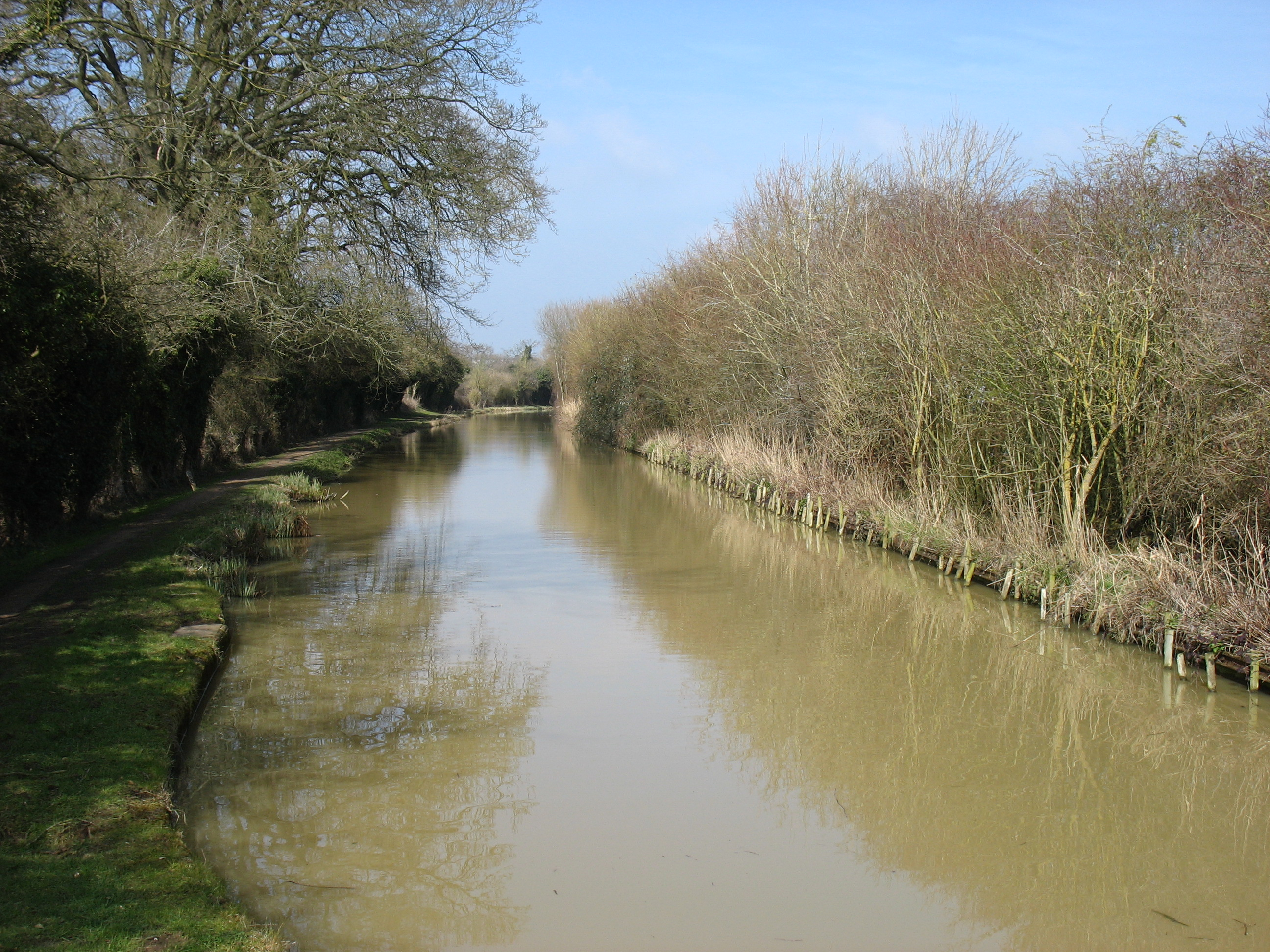
- Location of Rushy Meadows.
- Area of search: Oxfordshire
- Grid reference: SP 481 142
- Interest: Biological
- Area: 8.9 hectares (22 acres)
- Notification date: 1985
- Location map: Magic Map

Rushy Meadows is an 8.9-hectare (22-acre) biological Site of Special Scientific Interest on the western outskirts of Kidlington in Oxfordshire.

This site consists of unimproved alluvial grasslands on the bank of the Oxford Canal. The species-rich sward is dominated by hard rush, and other plants include water avens, which is very uncommon in the Thames Basin, pepper saxifrage, devil's bit scabious, early marsh orchid and distant sedge.

The site is private land with no public access.
