= Chinnor Chalk Pit =

UK Site of Special Scientific Interest

- Site of Special Scientific Interest
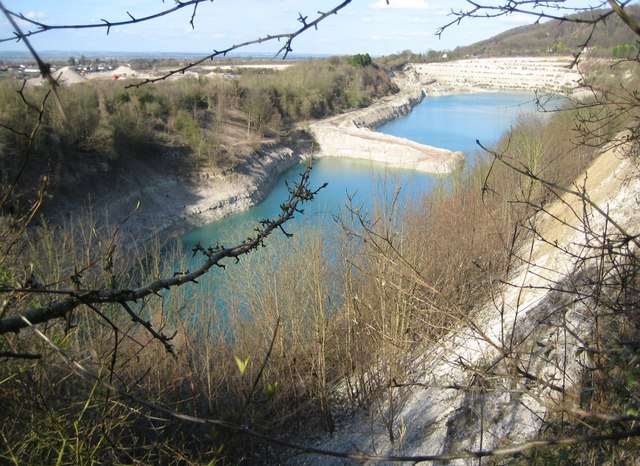
- Location of Chinnor Chalk Pit.
- Area of search: Oxfordshire
- Grid reference: SU 757 997
- Coordinates: 51.691°N 0.906°W
- Interest: Geological
- Area: 20.4 hectares (50 acres)
- Notification date: 1986
- Location map: Magic Map

Chinnor Chalk Pit is a 20.4-hectare (50-acre) formal chalk pit quarry that is a geological Site of Special Scientific Interest south of Chinnor in Oxfordshire, England. It is a Geological Conservation Review site.

This site is described by Natural England as "important for its excellent exposures of Totternhoe Stone", dating to the mid-Cenomanian stage of the Cretaceous period, around 100 million years ago. It has yielded many fossils of ammonites from the Lower and Middle Chalk.

== Old Kiln Lakes ==
The site is private land with no public access. Much of the former chalk pit is flooded and now known as Old Kiln Lakes. The lakes are freshwater but highly alkaline. In the summer of 2012, the public was warned to stay away and not swim in the lakes.

However, fish including carp and tench have lived in the lake, and since the late 20th century, a Chinnor Works Angling Society has had permission to fish the lakes.
