= Buckland Warren =

Protected area in Oxfordshire, England

Coordinates: 51.664°N 1.520°W

- Site of Special Scientific Interest
- Location of Buckland Warren.
- Area of search: Oxfordshire
- Grid reference: SU 333 963
- Interest: Biological
- Area: 0.04 hectares (0.099 acres)
- Notification date: 1992
- Location map: Magic Map

Buckland Warren is a 0.04-hectare (0.099-acre) biological Site of Special Scientific Interest (SSSI) east of Faringdon in Oxfordshire.

This narrow strip of cultivated land between a wood and a golf course is designated an SSSI because it has a population of the nationally rare broad-leaved cudweed, which has been recorded at less than ten sites in Britain and is listed in the British Red Data Book of Vascular Plants. This annual plant requires disturbance of the soil by ploughing in early to mid October.

The site is private land with no public access.
