= Harpsden Wood =

Protected area in Oxfordshire, England

Coordinates: 51.517°N 0.906°W

- Site of Special Scientific Interest
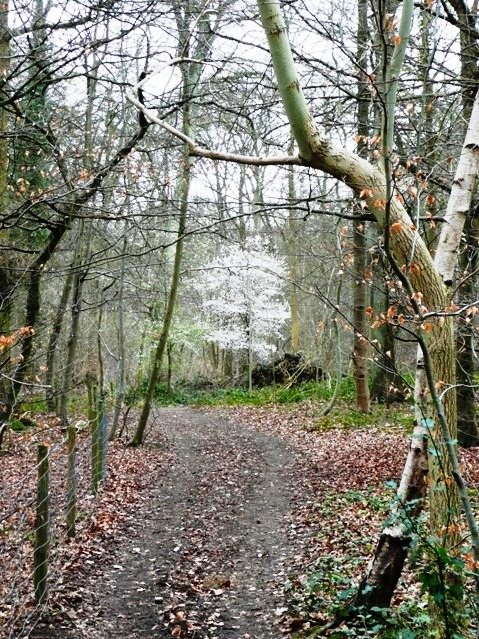
- Location of Harpsden Wood.
- Area of search: Oxfordshire
- Grid reference: SU 760 804
- Interest: Biological
- Area: 29.4 hectares (73 acres)
- Notification date: 1990
- Location map: Magic Map

Harpsden Wood is a 29.4-hectare (73-acre) biological Site of Special Scientific Interest south of Henley-on-Thames in Oxfordshire. It is owned by the Woodland Trust and is open to the public.

Most of this ancient wood is on acidic clay with flints, although some areas are on sandy clay or chalky silt. The acid soils have a sparse understorey but there is a diverse ground flora in the calcareous areas. Orchids include broad-leaved helleborine, green-flowered helleborine, bird's-nest orchid and narrow-lipped helleborine.
