= Brasenose Wood and Shotover Hill =

Protected area in Oxfordshire, England

Coordinates: 51.764°N 1.186°W

- Site of Special Scientific Interest
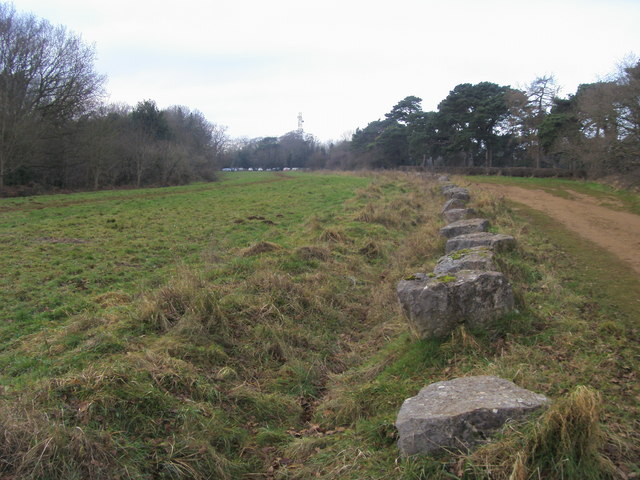
- Location of Brasenose Wood and Shotover Hill.
- Area of search: Oxfordshire
- Grid reference: SP 563 056
- Interest: Biological
- Area: 109.2 hectares (270 acres)
- Notification date: 1986
- Location map: Magic Map

Brasenose Wood and Shotover Hill is a 109.2-hectare (270-acre) biological Site of Special Scientific Interest on the eastern outskirts of Oxford in Oxfordshire. It is a Nature Conservation Review site.

Most Brasenose Wood is a remnant of the ancient Shotover Forest, and it is one of the few woods which is still managed by the traditional method of coppice-with-standards. It has a very diverse ground flora, and 221 species of vascular plant have been recorded, including 46 which are characteristic of ancient woodland. Shotover Hill has heath and unimproved grassland. It is described by Natural England as "of outstanding entomological interest", with many rare flies, bees, wasps and ants.

The site is owned and run by Oxford City Council as a country park and is open to the public.

== See also ==
- Shotover Park
