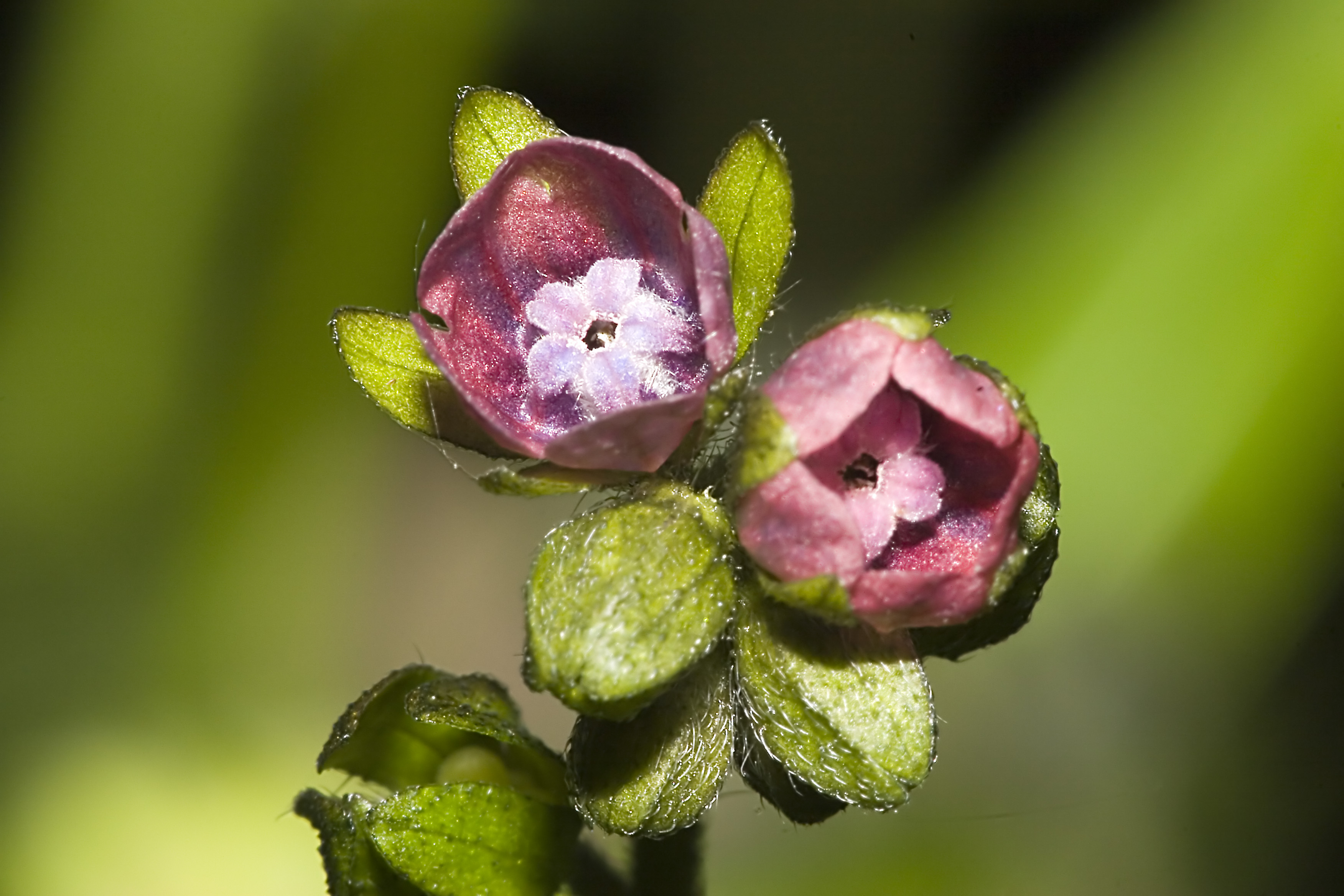
- Cynoglossum germanicum in Germany in 2009

Conservation status
- Critically Endangered (IUCN 3.1)

Scientific classification
- Kingdom: Plantae
- Clade: Tracheophytes
- Clade: Angiosperms
- Clade: Eudicots
- Clade: Asterids
- Order: Boraginales
- Family: Boraginaceae
- Genus: Cynoglossum
- Species: C. germanicum

Binomial name
- Cynoglossum germanicum Jacq.

Synonyms
- Cynoglossum montanum

= Cynoglossum germanicum =

Species of flowering plant

Cynoglossum germanicum, the green houndstongue, is a flowering plant species, in the family Boraginaceae, which is native to Europe.

== Description ==
Cynoglossum germanicum is a biennial or short-lived perennial herbaceous species, growing to a maximum height of 75cm.

It is similar to the closely related Cynoglossum officinale, however differs in having glabrous, shiny, light-green leaves and nutlets which are more convex outside and lack a thickened border. The typical habitats of the two species also differ strongly.

== Habitat and distribution ==
It grows in woodland glades, among deciduous trees, and sometimes hedgerows. It requires warm and nitrogen-rich conditions. It is native to Europe. It has become extinct in Scotland, but persists in England, where it is rare.

== Conservation ==
The IUCN has assessed the global conservation status of this species as critically endangered.

It was declining markedly in Britain before the Second World War, for unknown reasons, but benefited greatly from the Great Storm of 1987, which felled many trees and opened up Britain's woodlands.

== Etymology ==
Cynoglossum comes from the Ancient Greek 'kunoglosson' for hound's or dog's tongue, a reference to the shape and roughness of the leaves. The species epithet germanicum means German, presumably the species was first identified in Germany.
