= Berkshire, Buckinghamshire and Oxfordshire Wildlife Trust =

Wildlife conservation charity

- Company type: Conservation charity
- Headquarters: The Lodge; Armstrong Road; Littlemore; Oxford
- Area served: Berkshire, Buckinghamshire and Oxfordshire (United Kingdom)
- Key people: Steve Backshall (President); Sir Clive Booth (Chairman of Board of Trustees); Estelle Bailey (Chief Executive)
- Revenue: 7,015,000 pound sterling (2021)
- Operating income: ▼£3.83 million GBP (2012)
- Net income: ▼ -£198,356 GBP (2012)
- Total assets: ▼£11.82 million GBP (2012)
- Number of employees: c. 100 paid staff; 1,404 volunteers
- Website: www.bbowt.org.uk

The Berkshire, Buckinghamshire and Oxfordshire Wildlife Trust (BBOWT) is a Wildlife Trust covering the counties of Berkshire, Buckinghamshire and Oxfordshire in England.

The trust was formerly called the Berkshire, Buckinghamshire and Oxfordshire Naturalists' Trust (BBONT).

== Sites ==
=== Berkshire ===
Site	Photograph	Area (Note: The area, location and public access are taken from the Berkshire, Buckhamshire and Oxfordshire Wildlife Trust page for each site.)	Location	Public access	Classifications	Description
Audrey's Meadow	Audrey's Meadow	2.0 hectares (4.9 acres)	Greenham; 51.3905°N 1.3022°W; SU 486 659	YES		The site is named after Mrs Audrey Appleby, who set up the Friends of Audrey's Meadow. Invertebrates include brown hawker and emperor dragonflies, ringlet, small skipper and large skipper butterflies and Roesel's bush-crickets.
Avery's Pightle	Avery's Pightle	1.5 hectares (3.7 acres)	Enborne; 51.3837°N 1.3756°W; SU 435 651	YES	SSSI	This unimproved meadow is species rich and it has surviving ridge and furrow, suggesting a long history of traditional management without modern herbicides or fertilisers. Twenty-four species of grass and a 113 herbs have been recorded. There is a wet ditch which has water whorl grass.
Bowdown Woods	Bowdown Woods	54.5 hectares (135 acres)	Crookham; 51.3858°N 1.2721°W; SU 507 654	YES	SSSI	This site has heath, acid grassland and mixed scrub on the sands and clays of the Bagshot Beds, together with areas of gravel, on higher ground. London Clay outcrops on the lower slopes, and it has woodland with rich ground flora. There are many deep valleys with unpolluted spring-fed streams. The insect fauna is also very rich.
Bucklebury Common	Bucklebury Common	345.0 hectares (853 acres)	Bucklebury; 51.4189°N 1.2036°W; SU 554 691	FP		This privately owned estate is mainly broadleaved woodland, including a 400-year-old avenue of oak trees, but there are also large areas of heath. Fauna include dark bush-crickets, slow-worms, meadow grasshoppers, adders, nightjars and woodlarks.
Chawridge Bank	Chawridge Bank	4.5 hectares (11 acres)	Winkfield; 51.4547°N 0.71974°W; SU 890 736	YES	SSSI	This linear site is named after the stream called Chawridge Bourne, which runs through it. Half of it is unimproved grassland, which is managed by sheep grazing. There are also areas of scrub and broadleaved woodland. On the east side there is an ancient parish boundary hedge which has diverse tree flora.
Decoy Heath	Decoy Heath	8.0 hectares (20 acres)	Mortimer West End; 51.3668°N 1.1201°W; SU 613 634	YES	SSSI	This heathland site also has areas of bog. It is one of the best sites in the county for dragonflies and damselflies; the twenty-three species which breed in its shallow pools include keeled skimmer and four-spotted chaser dragonflies and white-legged, emerald and small red damselflies.
Greenham and Crookham Commons	Greenham Common	444.0 hectares (1,097 acres)	Greenham; 51.384°N 1.271°W; SU 507 652	YES	SSSI	In the 1980s Greenham Common was a military base storing nuclear weapons and the location of the Women's Peace Camp, but following the closure of the base it was opened to the public as a nature reserve in 2000. The two commons have the largest area of heathland and acid grassland in the county and other habitats are gorse scrub, broad leaved woodland and water-logged alder valleys. There is a rich variety of invertebrates, such as the white admiral, purple emperor and silver-washed fritillary woodland butterflies.
Haymill Valley	Haymill Valley	8.0 hectares (20 acres)	Burnham; 51.5295°N 0.6427°W; SU 942 820	YES	LNR	This nature reserve has woodland with bluebells and great spotted woodpecker, together with reedbeds which have flora including yellow iris and marsh-marigold. There are butterflies such as orange-tips, holly blues and speckled woods.
Hosehill Lake	Hosehill Lake - March 2017	23.5 hectares (58 acres)	Theale; 51.4239°N 1.0673°W; SU 649 698	YES	LNR	The lake has a wide variety of water birds, including lapwings, little ringed plovers and great crested grebes. There is also a wildflower meadow which is grazed by wild Exmoor ponies and it has many butterflies and moths.
Hurley Chalk Pit	Hurley Chalk Pit	1.0 hectare (2.5 acres)	Maidenhead; 51.5320°N 0.8293°W; SU 813 821	YES		This chalk pit, which was dug more than 150 years ago, is warm and sheltered and it has 15 species of butterfly, including common blues and gatekeepers. There are varied habitats, with woodland, scrub, grassland and hedges.
Inkpen Common	Inkpen Common	12.0 hectares (30 acres)	Inkpen; 51.3769°N 1.4518°W; SU 382 643	YES	SSSI	This is a surviving fragment of the former Inkpen Great Common. It is mainly damp heathland, with small areas of marsh, woods and bracken. Flora on the heath include purple moor grass, common gorse, lousewort, lesser dodder and the only surviving colony in Berkshire of pale heath violet.
Inkpen Crocus Field	Inkpen Crocus Field	3.0 hectares (7.4 acres)	Inkpen; 51.3752°N 1.4691°W; SU 370 641	YES	SSSI	In 1912, Charles Rothschild founded 'The Society for the Promotion of Nature Reserves', the forerunner of The Wildlife Trusts, and Inkpen Crocus Field is one of the 284 'Rochschild Reserves', a list drawn up by the Society in its first three years of sites "worthy of preservation". The spring crocus is a rare Red Data Book plant which is not native to Britain but has been recorded on this site since 1800. More than 400,000 flowers bloom in the spring.
Kintbury Newt Ponds	Kintbury Newt Ponds	2.5 hectares (6.2 acres)	Kintbury; 51.3949°N 1.4459°W; SU 386 663	YES		The ponds in this site have a population of great crested newts, which are a legally protected species. Their status protected the site from development as part of a housing estate in the 1990s. The site also has dense blackthorn scrub, reedbeds, woodland and grassland. Birds include chiffchaffs and song thrushes.
Loddon Nature Reserve	Loddon Nature Reserve	13.5 hectares (33 acres)	Twyford; 51.4753°N 0.8704°W; SU 785 757	YES		This site has a large gravel pit with several islands and surrounded by scrub, which provides a habitat for nesting wetland birds such as great crested grebes, moorhens and coots. There are wintering birds such as gadwalls, smews, tufted ducks, pochards, cormorants and snipes.
Moor Copse	Moor Copse	64.5 hectares (159 acres)	Tidmarsh; 51.4600°N 1.0881°W; SU 634 738	YES	SSSI	This reserve in the valley of the River Pang has wildflower meadows surrounded by wet woodland. In the autumn the woods have a range of fungi, such as deadman's fingers and green elfcup mushrooms. Mammals include foxes and badgers.
Nature Discovery Centre	Nature Discovery Centre	35 hectares (86 acres)	Thatcham; 51.39998°N 1.2738°W; SU 506 670	PL		This site has a variety of habitats including a lake, woodland, reedbeds and hedges. The lake has many wintering wildfowl such as shovelers and pochrds. Invertebrates include the bloody-nosed and rhinoceros beetles.
Padworth Common	Padworth Common	28.0 hectares (69 acres)	Mortimer West End; 51.3793°N 1.1113°W; SU 619 648	YES	LNR	This site is mainly heath, but there are also areas of grassland, wet gullies, ponds and oak and pine woodland. There is a variety of heathland birds such as Dartford warbler, tree pipit, European stonechat, woodlark and the rare nightjar. The pond has many dragonflies and damselflies.
Paices Wood Country Parkland	Paices Wood Country Parkland	35.0 hectares (86 acres)	Aldermaston; 51.3695°N 1.1524°W; SU 591 637	YES		The park has seven lakes, woodland and an amphibian area. Birds include lapwings and woodlarks, there are butterflies white admirals, graylings and purple emperors, and amphibians include palmate newts and common frogs.
Rack Marsh	Rack Marsh	4.0 hectares (9.9 acres)	Hungerford; 51.4223°N 1.3506°W; SU 452 694	YES	NCR, SAC, SSSI	This is an ancient water meadow in the valley of the River Lambourn, which has a thick layer of peat. A prehistoric canoe has been discovered in the peat, preserved in the water-logged conditions. The site has the nationally rare and declining Desmoulin's whorl snail, which is listed in the British Red Data Book, and there are some locally rare plants, such as marsh arrow-grass and southern marsh orchid.
Seven Barrows	Seven Barrows	3.5 hectares (8.6 acres)	Lambourn; 51.5436°N 1.5248°W; SU 330 828	YES	SM, SSSI	The site is part of a Bronze Age cemetery with scattered bowl barrows. The area is an unimproved chalk grassland with a rich flora and over 100 species of herbs have been recorded. It is also very rich in insects, especially butterflies, including small blue, brown argus, chalkhill blue, dark green fritillary and the scarce marsh fritillary.
Shepperlands Farm	Shepperlands Farm	9.5 hectares (23 acres)	Finchampstead; 51.3733°N 0.8822°W; SU 779 644	PP		This site was left to the trust by Len and Marie Goodwin. It has woodland, a wildflower meadow and an area of heathland. The meadow has flowers such as common bird's-foot-trefoils, buttercups and cuckooflowers in the summer, while the woodland has old oak trees and rotting timber which provide habitats for insects.
Snelsmore Common Country Park	Snelsmore Common Country Park	96.0 hectares (237 acres)	Newbury; 51.4366°N 1.3346°W; SU 463 710	YES	SSSI	This is a country park which has diverse habitats, including dry heath, wet heath, bog, birch woods and ancient semi-natural broadleaved woodland. The bog has a 5,000 year old layer of peat which has been studied stratigraphically to show changes in ancient land use and vegetation. An area of wet alder woodland has many lichens, including a rich community which grows on trees, such as Parmelia caperarta, Pertusaria pertusa and Lecanactis abietina.
Sole Common Pond	Sole Common Pond	3.0 hectares (7.4 acres)	Newbury; 51.4334°N 1.4094°W; SU 411 706	YES		The main wildlife interest of this site lies in the area of bog, which has the insectivorous round-leaved sundew, bogbean, marsh St John's-wort and common polypody. Other habitats are the pond, woodland and heath.
Thatcham Reed Beds	Thatcham Reedbeds	35.0 hectares (86 acres)	Thatcham; 51.4009°N 1.2736°W; SU 506 671	YES	LNR, SAC, SSSI	The site is nationally important for its reed beds, fen and species rich alder woods. It is also nationally important for Desmoulin's whorl snails and there are many breeding birds, such as the nationally rare Cetti's warbler. Wetland plants include common valerian, skullcap and marsh bedstraw.
Watts Bank	Watts Bank	1.5 hectares (3.7 acres)	Lambourn; 51.4925°N 1.5249°W; SU 331 772	YES	SSSI	This steeply sloping site is an area of unimproved grassland and scrub. There is a rich variety of herbs, such as salad burnet, lady's bedstraw, rough hawkbit and harebell. There are also many species of butterfly, including the uncommon Duke of Burgundy.
Wildmoor Heath	Wildmoor Heath	104.0 hectares (257 acres)	Sandhurst; 51.3582°N 0.7905°W; SU 843 628	YES	SSSI	This sloping site has wet and dry heath and woodland. There are also areas of bog which are grazed by Dexter cattle to keep down the growth of coarse purple moor-grass; twenty species of damselfly and dragonfly have been recorded in the bogs and plants include bog asphodel, butterwort, round-leaved sundew and white beaked-sedge.
Wokefield Common	Wokefield Common	60.0 hectares (148 acres)	Burghfield; 51.3915°N 1.0622°W; SU 653662	YES		The common is heath and woodland with two ponds, Dragonfly Pond and Pullen's Pond, which provide a habitat for a variety of dragonflies and damselflies. Other invertebrates include common blue, brimstone and comma butterflies. The main heathland plants are bell heather, common gorse and broom.

=== Buckinghamshire ===
Site	Photograph	Area	Location	Public access	Classifications	Description
Aston Clinton Ragpits	Aston Clinton Ragpits	2.5 hectares (6.2 acres)	Aston Clinton; 51.7884°N 0.7132°W; SP 888 107	YES	SSSI, CAONB	This grassland site has steeply sloping old pits and spoil heaps, with a rich assembly of shrubs, herbs and invertebrates, including twenty-seven butterfly species. There is some mature woodland with beech, yew, ash and whitebeam, together with a hedge and areas of scrub. There are eight orchid species.
Bacombe Hill	Bacombe Hill	25.0 hectares (62 acres)	Upper Bacombe; 51.7534°N 0.7671°W; SP 864 074	YES	SSSI, LNR, CAONB	The site is chalk grassland, scrub and woodland. It has pyramidal and bee orchids, wild thyme and chalkhill blue butterflies. The woodland on the slopes is mainly whitebeam and ash, with oak and birch on the plateau. Juniper shrubs provide a habitat for rare insects such as the juniper shield bug.
Bernwood Meadows	Bernwood Meadows	7.5 hectares (19 acres)	Oakley; 51.7957°N 1.1220°W; SP 606 111	YES		This traditional hay meadow has over 100 plant species, including lady's bedstraw, green winged orchids and cuckooflowers. It also has many species of butterfly, such as orange tip and rare black and brown hairstreaks. other wildlife includes brown hares, kestrels and moths.
Calvert Jubilee	Calvert Jubilee	22.0 hectares (54 acres)	Calvert; 51.9216°N 1.0090°W; SP 682 252	YES		Most of the site is a deep lake, created by the extraction of clay for the brick industry. It is now used in winter by wildfowl such as mallard, tufted duck and pochard. There are two bird hides, and the trust has created three floating islands to enable waterfowl to breed safe from foxes. The lakeside has a variety of wild flowers and butterflies.
College Lake	College Lake	65.0 hectares (161 acres)	Pitstone; 51.8201°N 0.6501°W; SP 931 144	YES	SSSI	The site has more than a thousand species of wildlife on the lake, marshland and grassland. Rare species include redshanks and Lapwings. The marshes are an important habitat for breeding waders, and chalk grassland has a range of insects and small mammals. One small area is a geological Site of Special Scientific Interest.
Dancersend with Pavis Woods	Dancersend	85.0 hectares (210 acres)	Aston Clinton; 51.7765°N 0.6962°W; SP 905 089	YES	SSSI, CAONB	There are woodland plantations, unimproved chalk grassland and scrub. The woods have few mature trees as most were felled during the 1940s, but a rich ground flora includes plants associated with ancient woodland, such as hairy brome and wood melick. The site is important for its butterflies and moths, and it has a diverse population of breeding birds.
Finemere Wood	Finemere Wood	76.5 hectares (189 acres)	Quainton; 51.8878°N 0.9531°W; SP 721 215	YES	SSSI	Most of the site is ancient pedunculate oak forest, which has butterflies including the rare wood white and black hairstreak. There is also an area of rough grassland and scrub which is crossed by the River Ray.
Foxcote Reservoir	Foxcote Reservoir	34 hectares (84 acres)	Akeley; 52.021°N 0.965°W; SP711364	YES	SSSI	The reservoir was created in 1956 by damming a tributary of the River Great Ouse. It is an important site for wintering wildfowl, with more than 1% of the British populations of shoveler ducks and Bewick's swans. The freshwater plants and aquatic fauna in the lake are also of ecological interest.
Gomm Valley	Gomm Valley	4.0 hectares (9.9 acres)	High Wycombe; 51.6215°N 0.7057°W; SU 898 921	YES	SSSI, CAONB,	The site is chalk grassland which is reverting to scrub. It has a rich variety of herbs and of invertebrates, and is notable for reptiles and over-wintering birds, particularly thrushes. Over 30 species of butterflies and 180 of moths have been recorded.
Grangelands and The Rifle Range	Grangelands	18.0 hectares (44 acres)	Cadsden; 51.7376°N 0.8009°W; SP 828 050	YES	SSSI, CAONB	The site has grassland and scrub, which support interesting breeding birds and invertebrates, such as glow-worms and marbled white and chalk hill blue butterflies. There are areas of mature beech woodland, with a sparse shrub layer of holly and elder.
Hog and Hollowhill Woods	Hollowhill Wood	7.8 hectares (19 acres)	Marlow; 51.8818°N 0.9852°W; SU 823 861	YES	SSSI, SAC, CAONB	A large part of the site is mature beech woodland, the result of neglected coppicing. Much of the ground is bare, but there are some unusual plants, including the nationally rare ghost orchid. Trees on the lower slopes include ash, wild cherry and crab apple, and there is heather in more open areas.
Homefield Wood	Homefield Wood	6.0 hectares (15 acres)	Hambleden; 51.5738°N 0.8275°W; SU 814 867	YES	SSSI, CAONB, FC	The site has young beech plantations, with some conifers and many native trees. There are rides and glades in some areas which have important and varied herb-rich chalk grassland, with plants such as Chiltern gentian and upright brome-grass and a variety of orchids. The rich invertebrate fauna includes thirty species of butterfly and over four hundred of moth.
Little Linford Wood	Little Linford Wood	42.5 hectares (105 acres)	Little Linford; 52.1020°N 0.7831°W; SP 834 455	YES		Much of the woodland is young as it was felled in 1980, shortly before the Trust took over the site, but there are also areas of mature oak and ash. In 1998 dormice were introduced, and they live high up in the canopy. Other mammals include stoats and badgers, and there are birds such as great spotted woodpeckers, kestrels and buzzards. Grassy rides provide a habitat for butterflies.
Long Grove Wood	Long Grove Wood	1.5 hectares (3.7 acres)	Seer Green; 51.6154°N 0.6098°W; SU 963 916	YES		The site is deciduous woodland with the main trees being beach and hornbeam. The Great Storm of 1987 brought down several trees, creating open areas which were colonised by flowers such as bluebell and yellow archangel. Dead wood is kept to provide a habitat for insects and fungi. Birds include great spotted woodpeckers and Eurasian treecreepers.
Millfield Wood	Millfield Wood	7.5 hectares (19 acres)	High Wycombe; 51.6511°N 0.7432°W; SU 870 956	YES	SSSI	The site was owned in the late nineteenth century by Benjamin Disraeli, and the woodland is much older. It is semi-natural beech woodland on chalk, which is an unusual habitat, and it also has considerable wych elm. Its rich ground flora includes many wild flowers. There are a number of badger setts and a varied invertebrate fauna. Birds include great spotted woodpeckers and chiffchaffs.
Pilch Field	Pilch Field	12.0 hectares (30 acres)	Great Horwood; 51.9837°N 0.9130°W; SP 749 321	YES	SSSI	The site has two fields called Big Pilch and Little Pilch. The varied habitats in Big Pilch include wetland, fen, scrub, a stream and ridge-and-furrow grassland. The stream continues into Little Pilch, which has spring-fed fen and grassland. Over 200 flowering plants have been recorded. There are birds such as turtle doves, yellowhammers and reed buntings.
Rushbeds Wood	Rushbeds Wood	56.0 hectares (138 acres)	Wotton Underwood; 51.8336°N 1.0240°W; SP 673 154	YES	SSSI	The site is ancient woodland on heavy clay soils which are often waterlogged. The invertebrate fauna are described by Natural England as "exceptional", including over thirty butterfly species, such as the nationally rare black hairstreak and the scarce wood white and purple emperor. The woodland is wet ash and maple, and the understorey has species indicative of long tree cover, such as Poa nemoralis. In the ponds and ditches there are breeding smooth and great crested newts.
Upper Ray Meadows	View from bird hide at Gallows Bridge Farm	181.0 hectares (447 acres)	Marsh Gibbon; 51.8750°N 1.0289°W; SP 669 200	PP	SSSI	The site consists of meadows on the floodplain of the River Ray, and it is a stronghold for rare species because heavy clay soils and frequent flooding makes arable farming difficult. Medieval ridge and furrow can still be seen in some fields. In the summer, drier areas have displays of wild flowers such as black knapweed, meadowsweet and tufted vetch.
Weston Turville Reservoir	Weston Turville Reservoir	18.5 hectares (46 acres)	Weston Turville; 51.7789°N 0.7512°W; SP 862 096	YES	SSSI, CAONB	The reservoir was built in 1797 to supply water to the Wendover Arm of the Grand Union Canal. Large areas have a deep silt deposit, but the open water is an important site for 46 species of over-wintering waterfowl, and it is nationally important for shovelers. The areas around the reservoir has tall fen, reed beds and willow carr, which are declining habitats in Britain. There are over 300 species of beetle, of which six are rare nationally.
Yoesden	Yoesden	13.8 hectares (34 acres)	Bledlow Ridge; 51.6748°N 0.8596°W; SU 789 979	YES		The site has areas of woodland and grassland. The steeply sloping chalk meadow has many species of butterfly, including three scarce blue species, the Adonis, chalkhill and small blue. There are flowers such as common spotted and fragrant orchids. Beech woodland above the chalk bank supports great spotted woodpeckers and red kites, and lower woodland has beech and yews.

=== Oxfordshire ===
Site	Photograph	Area	Location	Public access	Classifications	Description
Ardley Wood Quarry	Ardley Wood Quarry	11.0 hectares (27 acres)	Ardley; 51.9412°N 1.2190°W; SP 537 272	YES	GCR, SM, SSSI	The quarry exposes rocks dating to the Bathonian stage of the Middle Jurassic, about 167 million years ago. It is described by Natural England as of national importance for the understanding of the Jurassic Period in Britain as it allows correlation of rocks of the Oxford area to be correlated with those of the Midlands. The site has calcareous grassland with diverse vertebrates, including the internationally protected great crested newt.
Asham Meads		23.0 hectares (57 acres)	Murcott; 51.8242°N 1.1453°W; SP 590 143	YES	SSSI	
Blenheim Farm	Blenheim Farm	0.5 hectares (1.2 acres)	Charlbury; 51.8720°N 1.4727°W; SP 364 194	YES		This is a meadow surrounded by ancient hedges and woodland. Flora include common knapweed, lady's bedstraw, cowslip and ragged-robin, while there are butterflies such as the common blue and orange tip. Amphibians include common frogs, common toads and smooth newts.
Chimney Meadows	Chimney Meadows	261.0 hectares (645 acres)	Chimney; 51.7093°N 1.4891°W; SP 354 013	YES	NNR, SSSI	This site, which consists of six botanically rich alluvial meadows, is bordered on the south by the River Thames. The meadows are intersected by ditches, most of which are covered in reed canary-grass. The most common grasses are crested dog's-tail, creeping bent, perennial rye-grass, hairy sedge and glaucous sedge.
Chinnor Hill	Chinnor Hill	27.5 hectares (68 acres)	Chinnor; 51.6953°N 0.89168°W; SP 767 002	YES	SSSI	This hill has species-rich calcareous grassland, juniper scrub, which is an uncommon habitat, mixed scrub and woodland. More than 300 species of vascular plant have been recorded and 65 of birds. Many passerines breed in the scrub, and thrushes such as redwings and fieldfares feed on berries in the winter.
Cholsey Marsh	Cholsey Marsh	19.0 hectares (47 acres)	Cholsey; 51.5652°N 1.1343°W; SU 601 855	YES		The Thames Path runs through this marsh on the bank of the River Thames. Wet reed and sedge beds provide a habitat for diverse wildlife and there are also areas of grassland, willow scrub and two large ponds. Flora include marsh-marigold, meadowsweet and the rare summer snowflake.
CS Lewis Nature Reserve	CS Lewis Nature Reserve	2.5 hectares (6.2 acres)	Oxford; 51.7562°N 1.1901°W; SP 560 067	YES		This reserve, which was formerly owned by the writer of children's books, C. S. Lewis, has a flooded clay pit, with many aquatic plants, toads, dragonflies and damselflies. There is also a steeply sloping wood with large boulders.
Dry Sandford Pit	Damselfly in Dry Sandford Pit	8.0 hectares (20 acres)	Dry Sandford; 51.6941°N 1.3258°W; SU 467 997	YES	SSSI	This former sand quarry exposes a sequence of limestone rocks laid down in shallow coastal waters during the Oxfordian stage of the Jurassic, around 160 million years ago. It has many fossil ammonites. It has diverse calcareous habitats, including fen, grassland, scrub and heath. It is nationally important entomologically, especially for bees and wasps.
Foxholes	Foxholes	23.0 hectares (57 acres)	Charlbury; 51.8843°N 1.6309°W; SP 263 204	YES	SSSI	
Glyme Valley	Glyme Valley	2.5 hectares (6.2 acres)	Chipping Norton; 51.9315°N 1.5156°W; SP 334 260	YES	SSSI	This site on the bank of the River Glyme has grassland and woodland. The wildlife is diverse, and flowering plants include bee orchid, cowslip, fairy flax, meadow crane's-bill and yellow rattle. There are a number of large anthills.
Hartslock	Hartslock	9.5 hectares (23 acres)	Pangbourne; 51.5120°N 1.1137°W; SU 616 796	YES	SAC, SSSI	This sloping area of grassland on the bank of the River Thames has a variety of orchids, including bee, pyramidal, common twayblade, white helleborine and the rare monkey orchid. There is also a rich insect fauna.
Hitchcopse Pit	Hitchcopse Pit	3.0 hectares (7.4 acres)	Dry Sandford; 51.6924°N 1.34748°W; SU 452 995	YES	SSSI	This former sand quarry has heath, woodland, scrub, grassland and a pond. There are many solitary bees and wasps, which create burrows in the soft sand walls of the quarry. The ground has many lichens and grassland plants, and there are scattered boulders which are covered with mosses.
Hook Norton Cutting	Hook Norton Cutting	8.0 hectares (20 acres)	Hook Norton; 51.9880°N 1.4772°W; SP 360 323	YES	SSSI	This reserve is in two stretches of a disused railway line separated by a tunnel. Most of it is unimproved calcareous grassland with a rich variety of flora. The site is notable for its bee species, including one which has only been recorded at three other sites in the country, Andrena bucephala. It is geologically important because it exposes rocks dating to the Middle Jurassic, around 167 million years ago, which are the type section of the Hook Norton Member of the Chipping Norton Formation.
Iffley Meadows	Cattle on Iffley Meadows	33.0 hectares (82 acres)	Oxford; 51.7314°N 1.2412°W; SP 525 039	YES	SSSI	These flood meadows between two arms of the River Thames are traditionally managed for hay and pasture. A large part of the site is on clay, and it is enriched by silt each year when it is flooded. There is a rich grassland flora, with the outstanding feature being 89,000 snake's head fritillaries, which produce purple flowers in the spring. There is a network of old river channels, ditches and overgrown hedges.
Lashford Lane Fen	Lashford Lane Fen	6.5 hectares (16 acres)	Dry Sandford; 51.7067°N 1.3241°W; SP 468 011	YES	SAC, SSSI	Sandford Brook runs through this wet valley, which has limestone grassland, fen, woods, scrub, a pond and reedbeds. Reed buntings winter on the site, and other birds include water rail and reed warblers. There are common frogs and grass snakes.
Letcombe Valley	Letcombe Valley	7.5 hectares (19 acres)	Letcombe Regis; 51.5717°N 1.4568°W; SU 377 860	YES		Letcombe Brook, which runs through the reserve, is one of only two chalk streams in Oxfordshire and 161 nationwide. Wildlife includes water voles and fish such as bullhead, brown trout and the primitive brook lamprey. There are also Daubenton's bats, while insects include rare flies. Additional habitats are ancient woodland and a small area of chalk grassland.
Oakley Hill	Oakley Hill	13.0 hectares (32 acres)	Chinnor; 51.6883°N 0.9121°W; SU 753 994	YES		This hill has chalk grassland, beech woodland and scrub. Flowering plants include Chiltern gentian, wild thyme, clustered bellflower, pyramidal orchid, yellow-wort, dog's mercury, bluebell, common rock-rose and harebell.
Oxey Mead		8.0 hectares (20 acres)	Cherwell District; 51.7929°N 1.3083°W; SP 478 107	YES		
Parsonage Moor	Parsonage Moor	5.5 hectares (14 acres)	Dry Sandford; 51.6942°N 1.3344°W; SU 461 997	YES	NCR SAC, SSSI	This site has fen, which is a nationally rare habitat, wet woodland, ancient woodland, open water and reedbeds. There are carnivorous plants, such as butterwort, which traps insects on its sticky leaves, and bladderwort, which traps them underwater. Other flora include southern marsh-orchids and the nationally scarce narrow-leaved marsh orchid
Sydlings Copse		22.0 hectares (54 acres)	Headington; 51.78228°N 1.1911°W; SP 559 096	YES	SSSI	
Warburg Nature Reserve	Warburg Nature Reserve	106.5 hectares (263 acres)	Henley-on-Thames; 51.5845°N 0.96077°W; SU 721 878	YES	SSSI	This site has ancient woods which are shown on a map of 1786, together with areas of grassy clearings and scrub. More than 500 species of vascular plant have been recorded, including 18 orchids and the rare meadow clary, which is listed in the British Red Data Book of Plants. There are more than 75 bird species and 650 fungi, including many which are nationally rare.
Warren Bank	Warren Bank	3.0 hectares (7.4 acres)	Henley-on-Thames; 51.5666°N 1.05886°W; SU 653 857	YES	SSSI	This steeply sloping site has unimproved chalk grassland and scrub. There is a rich variety of flora, including horseshoe vetch, chalk milkwort and bee orchid. There are also many insects, with butterflies such as dark green fritillary and green hairstreak.
Wells Farm	Wells Farm	66.0 hectares (163 acres)	Little Milton; 51.7053°N 1.09766°W; SP 624 011	FP		This is a working farm which grows wheat and barley. The fields have six metre wide margins which have been sown with wildflower seeds. There are also areas of wetland, grassland and woods. Birds include yellowhammer, grey partridge and red kite.
Whitecross Green Wood	Whitecross Green Wood	64.0 hectares (158 acres)	Boarstall; 51.8254°N 1.1257°W; SP 603 144	YES	SSSI	These ancient woods are part of two former royal forests, Shotover and Bernwood. They are crossed by herb-rich and grassy rides, some of which are bordered by ditches, and there is also a pond and a marsh. Twenty-four species of butterfly have been recorded including the nationally rare black hairstreak.
Woodford Bottom and Lamb's Pool	Lamb's Pool	3 hectares (7.4 acres)	Hook Norton; 52.022°N 1.484°W; SP352361	YES		This site has an artificial pool, marshes and grassland. Pipistrelle, Daubenton's and noctule bats hunt over the lake and an island in the middle is used by breeding birds such as coots and tufted ducks. There is Reed sweet-grass and common reedmace in the marsh.
Woodsides Meadow	Woodsides Meadow	4 hectares (9.9 acres)	Kidlington; 51.855°N 1.194°W; SP556177	YES	SSSI	This meadow still has medieval ridge and furrow marks, showing that it has not been farmed by modern methods. More than 100 species of wild flower have been recorded, such as pepper-saxifrage, sneezewort, green-winged orchid, cuckooflower and ragged-robin. Skylarks and brown hares are often seen on the site.

== Sources ==
- British Red Data Books. Vol. 1–3. Nature Conservancy Council; Joint Nature Conservation Committee. 1977–1999.
