= Dancersend =

Protected area in Buckinghamshire, England

Coordinates: 51.7765°N 0.6962°W

- Site of Special Scientific Interest
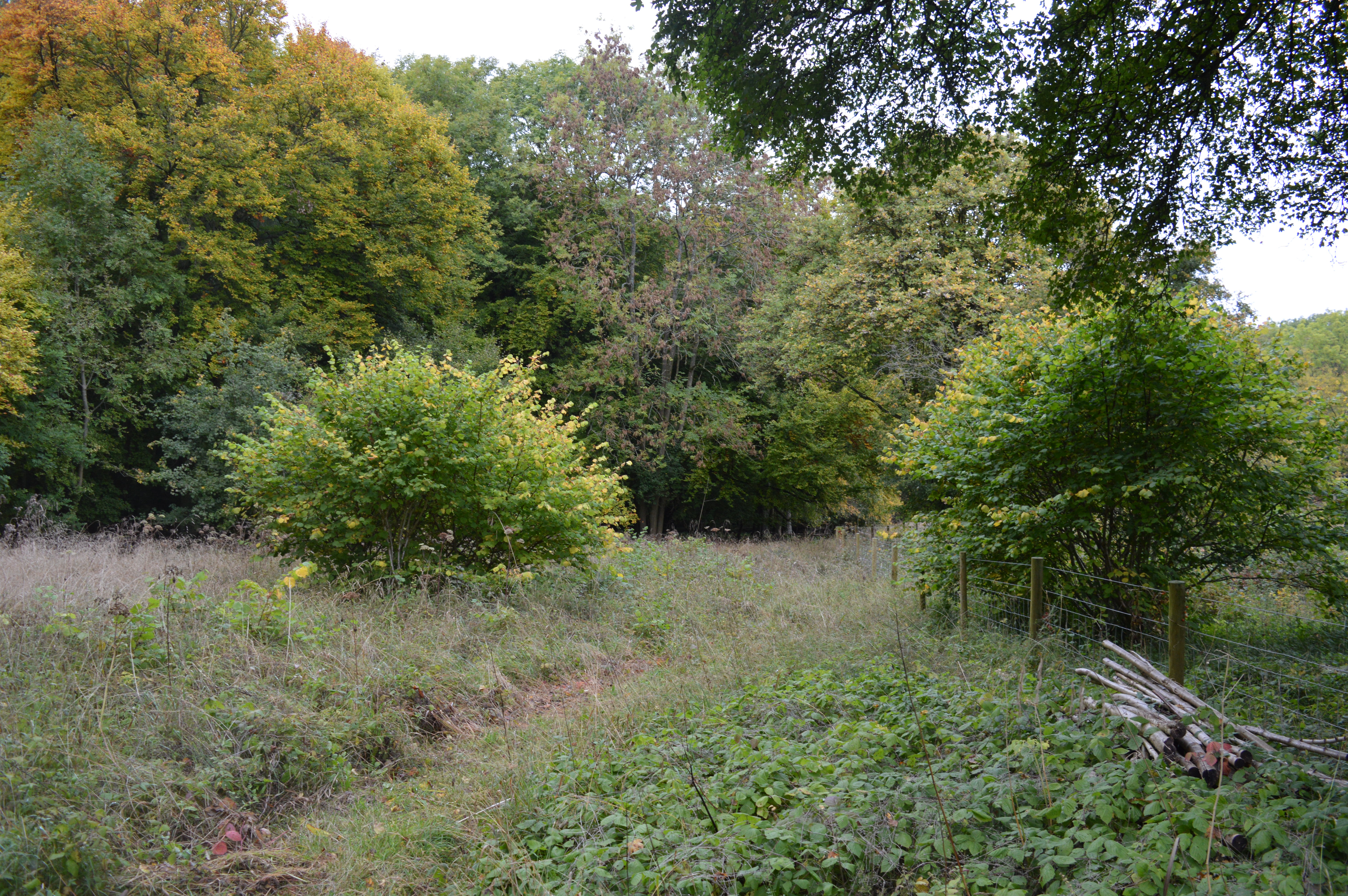
- Location of Dancersend.
- Area of search: Buckinghamshire
- Grid reference: SP900094
- Interest: Biological
- Area: 81.3 ha (201 acres)
- Notification date: 1986
- Location map: Magic Map

Dancersend is an 81.3-hectare (201-acre) Site of Special Scientific Interest (SSSI) south of Aston Clinton in Buckinghamshire. Part of the site is managed by the Forestry Commission and part by the Berkshire, Buckinghamshire and Oxfordshire Wildlife Trust (BBOWT). The BBOWT's 47 hectare nature reserve, called Dancersend with Pavis Woods, extends into fields west of the SSSI. It is in the Chilterns Areas of Outstanding Natural Beauty.

The site was formerly the Dancersend estate of the Rothschild family, who developed it as a nature reserve. It has woodland plantations, unimproved chalk grassland and scrub. The woods have few mature trees as most were felled during the 1940s, but a rich ground flora includes plants associated with ancient woodland, such as hairy brome and wood melick. The site is important for its butterflies and moths, and it has a diverse population of breeding birds.

There is access from Bottom Road in Spencersgreen, and by St Leonards Road between Aston Clinton and Chivery.
