= Wells Farm =

Nature preserve in Oxfordshire, England

Coordinates: 51.7053°N 1.09766°W

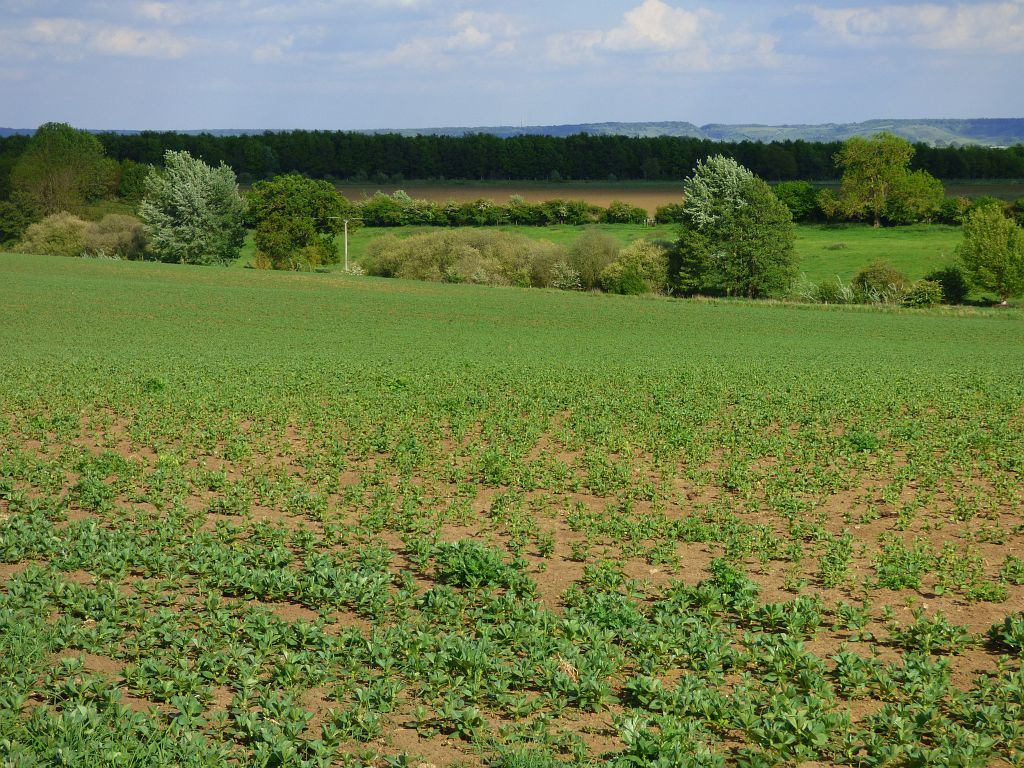
- Interactive map of Wells Farm
- Type: Nature reserve
- Location: Little Milton, Oxfordshire
- OS grid: SP621008
- Area: 64 hectares (160 acres)
- Manager: Berkshire, Buckinghamshire and Oxfordshire Wildlife Trust

Wells Farm is a 64-hectare (160-acre) nature reserve on the eastern outskirts of Little Milton in Oxfordshire. It is managed by the Berkshire, Buckinghamshire and Oxfordshire Wildlife Trust.

This is a working farm which grows wheat and barley. The fields have six metre wide margins which have been sown with wildflower seeds. There are also areas of wetland, grassland and woods. Birds include yellowhammer, grey partridge and red kite.

There is a footpath through the farm.
