= Thatcham Reed Beds =

Nature reserve in the United Kingdom county of Berkshire

- Site of Special Scientific Interest
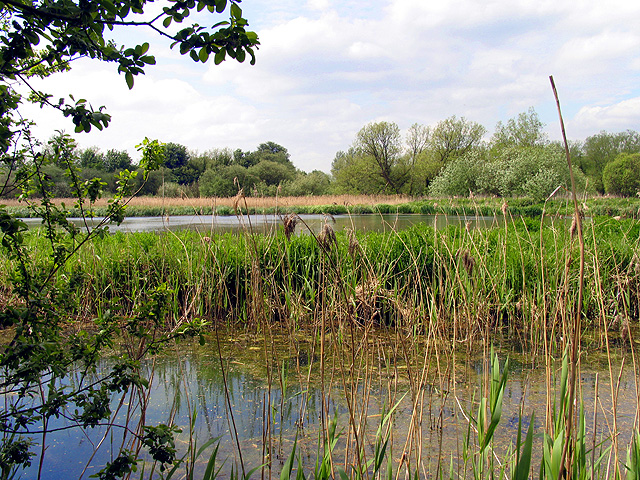

- Location within Berkshire
- Location of Thatcham Reed Beds.
- Area of search: Berkshire
- Grid reference: SU 507 664
- Coordinates: 51.394°N 1.273°W
- Interest: Biological
- Area: 67.4 hectares (167 acres)
- Notification date: 2002
- Location map: Magic Map

Thatcham Reed Beds is a 67.4-hectare (167-acre) biological Site of Special Scientific Interest east of Newbury in Berkshire. It is part of the Kennet & Lambourn Floodplain Special Area of Conservation and an area of 14 hectares (35 acres) is a Local Nature Reserve. An area of 35 hectares (86 acres) is managed by the Berkshire, Buckinghamshire and Oxfordshire Wildlife Trust.

Thatcham Reed Beds is important nationally for its extensive reed bed, species-rich alder woodland and fen habitats. The latter supports Desmoulin's whorl snail (Vertigo moulinsiana), which is of national and European importance. A large assemblage of breeding birds including nationally rare species such as Cetti's warbler (Cettia cetti) is also associated with the reedbed, fen and open water habitats found at Thatcham Reed Beds.

Thatcham's network of gravel pits, reedbed, woodland, hedges, and grassland is rich in wildlife and has been made into The Nature Discovery Centre by the Royal Society for the Protection of Birds.
