= Bernwood Meadows =

Nature reserve in Buckinghamshire, England

Coordinates: 51.7957°N 1.122°W

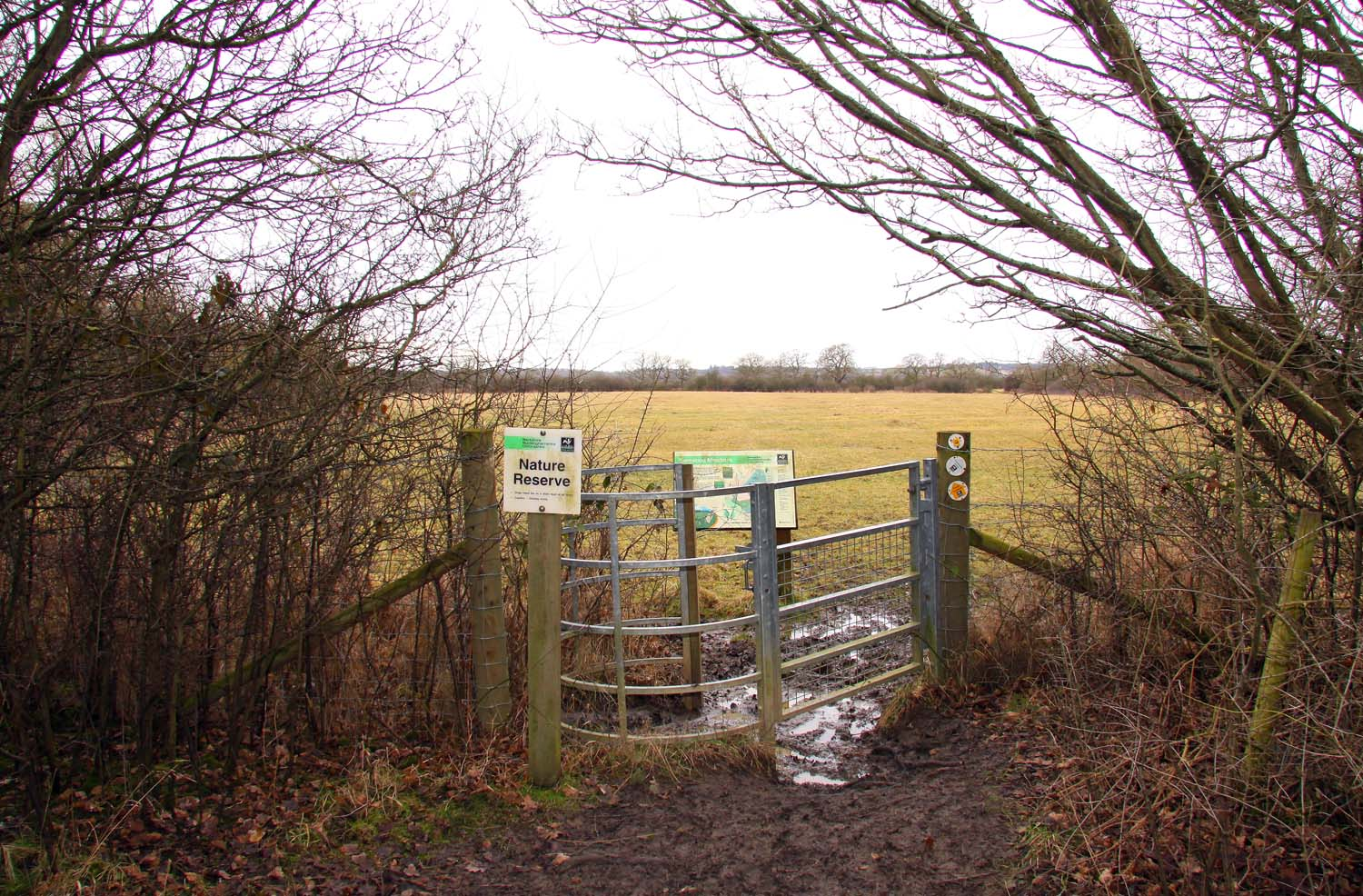

Bernwood Meadows is a 7.5-hectare (19-acre) nature reserve near Oakley in Buckinghamshire. It is managed by the Berkshire, Buckinghamshire and Oxfordshire Wildlife Trust.

This traditional hay meadow has over 100 plant species, including lady's bedstraw, green winged orchids and cuckooflowers. It also has many species of butterfly, such as orange tip and rare black and brown hairstreaks. other wildlife includes brown hares, kestrels and moths.

There is access from the road between Stanton St. John and Oakley.
