= Millfield Wood =

Protected area in Buckinghamshire, England

Coordinates: 51.6511°N 0.7432°W

- Site of Special Scientific Interest
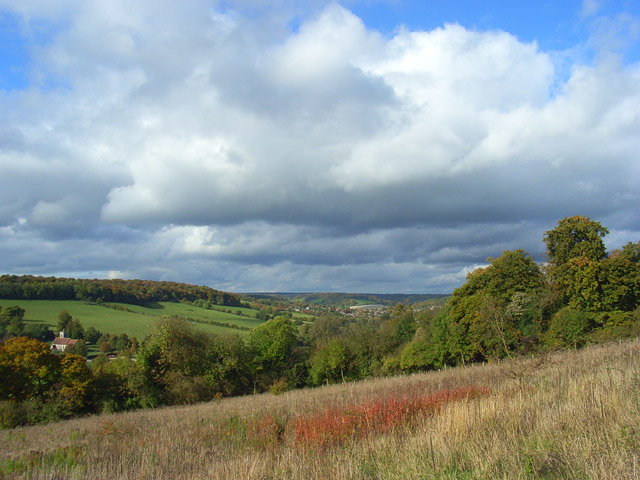
- Location of Millfield Wood.
- Area of search: Buckinghamshire
- Grid reference: SU870954
- Interest: Biological
- Area: 9.5 ha (23 acres)
- Notification date: 1984
- Location map: Magic Map

Millfield Wood is a 9.5-hectare (23-acre) biological Site of Special Scientific Interest north of High Wycombe in Buckinghamshire. It is owned and managed by the Berkshire, Buckinghamshire and Oxfordshire Wildlife Trust, and it is in the Chilterns Areas of Outstanding Natural Beauty.

The site was owned in the late nineteenth century by Benjamin Disraeli, and the woodland is much older. It is semi-natural beech woodland on chalk, which is an unusual habitat, and it also has considerable wych elm. Its rich ground flora includes some ancient woodland and nationally restricted species, and many wild flowers, which is unusual in beech woodland. There are a number of badger setts and a varied invertebrate fauna. Birds include great spotted woodpeckers and chiffchaffs.

There is access by a footpath from White Hill.
