= Hurley Chalk Pit =

Nature reserve in Berkshire, England

Coordinates: 51.5320°N 0.8293°W

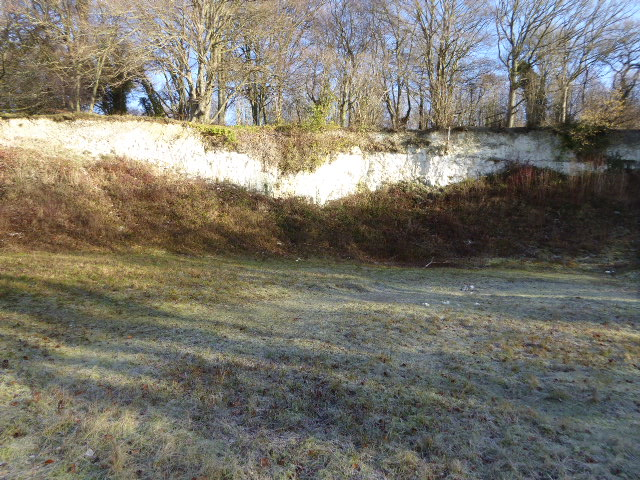
- Interactive map of Hurley Chalk Pit
- Type: Nature reserve
- Location: Maidenhead, Berkshire
- OS grid: SU813824
- Area: 1 hectare (2.5 acres)
- Manager: Berkshire, Buckinghamshire and Oxfordshire Wildlife Trust

Hurley Chalk Pit is a 1-hectare (2.5-acre) nature reserve west of Maidenhead in Berkshire. It is managed by the Berkshire, Buckinghamshire and Oxfordshire Wildlife Trust.

This chalk pit, which was dug more than 150 years ago, is warm and sheltered and it has 15 species of butterfly, including common blues and gatekeepers. There are varied habitats, with woodland, scrub, grassland and hedges.

There is access from a footpath which runs north from Warren Row.
