= Weston Turville Reservoir =

Reservoir in Buckinghamshire, England

Coordinates: 51.7789°N 0.7512°W

- Site of Special Scientific Interest
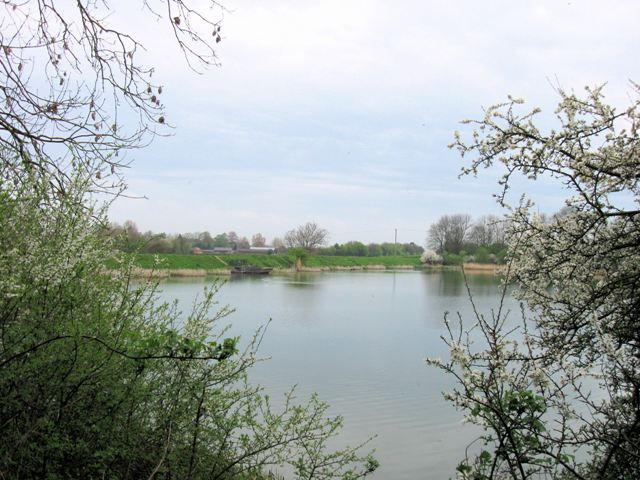
- Location of Weston Turville Reservoir.
- Area of search: Buckinghamshire
- Grid reference: SP862096
- Interest: Biological
- Area: 19.0 ha (47 acres)
- Notification date: 1986
- Location map: Magic Map

Weston Turville Reservoir is a 19 hectare biological Site of Special Scientific Interest south of Weston Turville in Buckinghamshire. It is owned by the Canal & River Trust, and the open water is leased to sailing and fishing clubs while the surrounding land is managed by the Berkshire, Buckinghamshire and Oxfordshire Wildlife Trust. The site is in the Chilterns Area of Outstanding Natural Beauty.

The reservoir was built in 1797 to supply water to the Wendover Arm of the Grand Union Canal. Large areas now have a deep silt deposit but in the more open areas, fan-leafed water crowfoot, small pondweed and the European white water lily grow. The southwestern and southern parts have extensive reed beds and this is where water mudwort and orange foxtail are both found, both plants being rare in Buckinghamshire. There is a more varied flora in the southeastern part, with grey clubrush and lesser bulrush. The two chalk streams that flow into the reservoir pass through an area of tall fen and here, and by the side of a small pond, early marsh orchids grow. The trees are mostly grey willow, crack willow, silver birch and other deciduous species.

The open water is an important site for 46 species of over-wintering waterfowl, and it is nationally important for shovelers. The areas around the reservoir have tall fen, reed beds and willow carr, declining habitats in Britain. There are over 300 species of beetle, of which six are rare nationally.

There is access to the perimeter path around the reservoir from World's End Lane and Halton Lane. The reservoir is home to Aylesbury Sailing Club, which can be accessed on the same path.
