= Blenheim Farm =

Nature reserve in Oxfordshire, England

Coordinates: 51.8720°N 1.4727°W

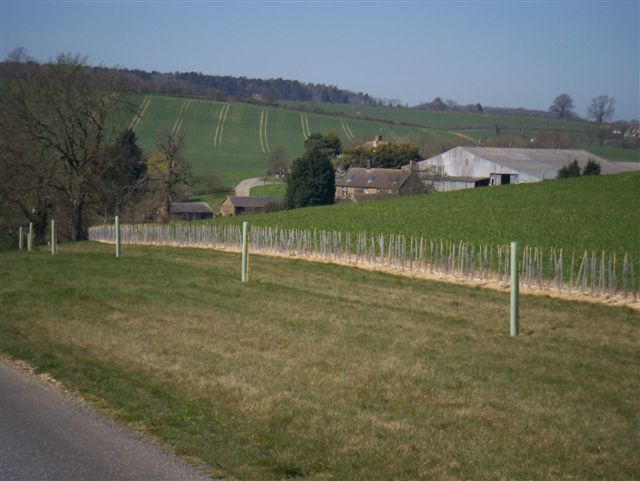
- Interactive map of Blenheim Farm
- Type: Nature reserve
- Location: Charlbury, Oxfordshire
- OS grid: SP365195
- Area: 1 hectare (2.5 acres)
- Manager: Berkshire, Buckinghamshire and Oxfordshire Wildlife Trust

Blenheim Farm is a 1-hectare (2.5-acre) nature reserve near Charlbury in Oxfordshire. It is owned and managed by the Berkshire, Buckinghamshire and Oxfordshire Wildlife Trust.

This is a meadow surrounded by ancient hedges and woodland. Flora include common knapweed, lady's bedstraw, cowslip and ragged-robin, while there are butterflies such as the common blue and orange tip. Amphibians include common frogs, common toads and smooth newts.
