= Shepperlands Farm =

Nature reserve in Berkshire, England

Coordinates: 51.3733°N 0.8822°W

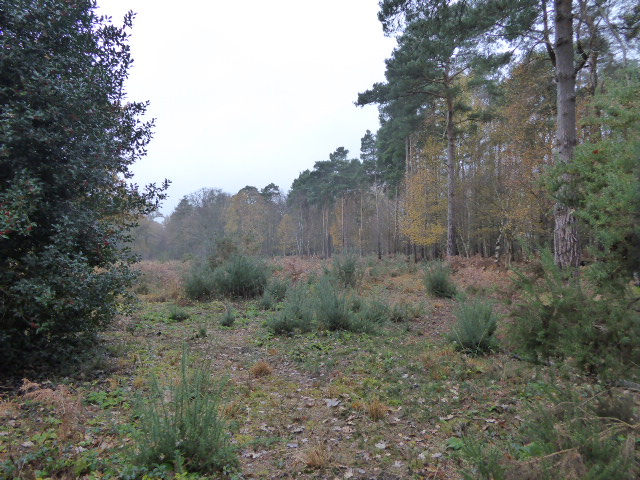
- Heath area with woodland in the background
- Interactive map of Shepperlands Farm
- Type: Nature reserve
- Location: Finchampstead, Berkshire
- OS grid: SU778642
- Area: 10 hectares (25 acres)
- Manager: Berkshire, Buckinghamshire and Oxfordshire Wildlife Trust

Shepperlands Farm is a 10-hectare (25-acre) nature reserve north-west of Finchampstead in Berkshire. It is managed by the Berkshire, Buckinghamshire and Oxfordshire Wildlife Trust.

== Geography and site ==
Shepperlands Farm has a wildflower meadow, an area of woodland and a patch of heathland.

== Fauna ==
The site has the following fauna:

=== Mammals ===
- Roe deer
- Red fox
- European badger

=== Reptiles and amphibians ===
- Vipera berus
- Grass snake
- Anguis fragilis
- Zootoca vivipara

=== Invertebrates ===
- Aricia agestis
- Polyommatus icarus
- Melanargia galathea
- Anthocharis cardamines
- Favonius quercus
- Leptophyes punctatissima
- Limenitis camilla
- Enallagma cyathigerum
- Vanessa atalanta

=== Birds ===
- Eurasian blue tit
- Eurasian treecreeper
- Buteo buteo
- Caprimulgus europaeus

== Flora ==
The site has the following flora:

=== Trees ===
- Quercus robur
- Birch

=== Plants ===
- Sorrel
- Erica tetralix
- Lychnis flos-cuculi
- Cardamine pratensis
- Calluna vulgaris
- Potentilla erecta
- Vicia cracca
- Lotus corniculatus
- Ranunculus
