= Pilch Fields =

Protected area in Buckinghamshire, England

Coordinates: 51.9837°N 0.9130°W

- Site of Special Scientific Interest
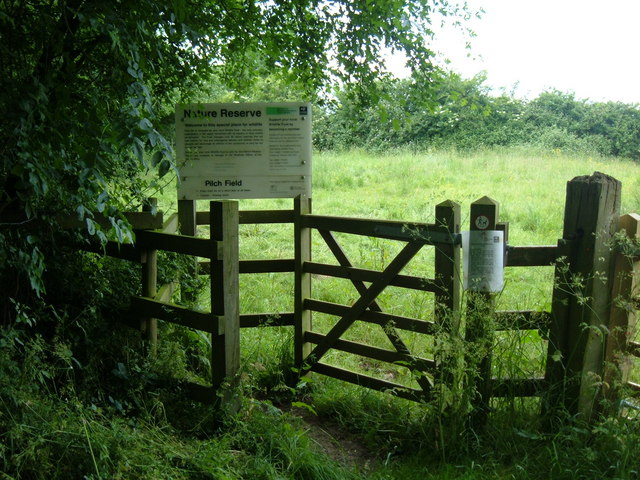
- Location of Pilch Fields.
- Area of search: Buckinghamshire
- Grid reference: SP747322
- Interest: Biological
- Area: 11.1 ha (27 acres)
- Notification date: 1984
- Location map: Magic Map

Pilch Fields is an 11.1-hectare (27-acre) biological Site of Special Scientific Interest (SSSI) west of Great Horwood in Buckinghamshire. It is managed by the Berkshire, Buckinghamshire and Oxfordshire Wildlife Trust.

The site has two fields called Big Pilch and Little Pilch. The varied habitats in Big Pilch include wetland, fen, scrub, a stream and ridge-and-furrow grassland. The stream continues into Little Pilch, which has spring-fed fen and grassland. Over two hundred flowering plants have been recorded. Tall hedges provide additional ecological interest. Invertebrates include butterflies, moths and many ants. There are birds such as turtle doves, yellowhammers and reed buntings.

There is access from Pilch Lane through a small field which is part of the nature reserve but is not part of the SSSI.
