= Aston Clinton Ragpits =

Protected area in Buckinghamshire, England

Coordinates: 51.789261°N 0.71322°W

- Site of Special Scientific Interest
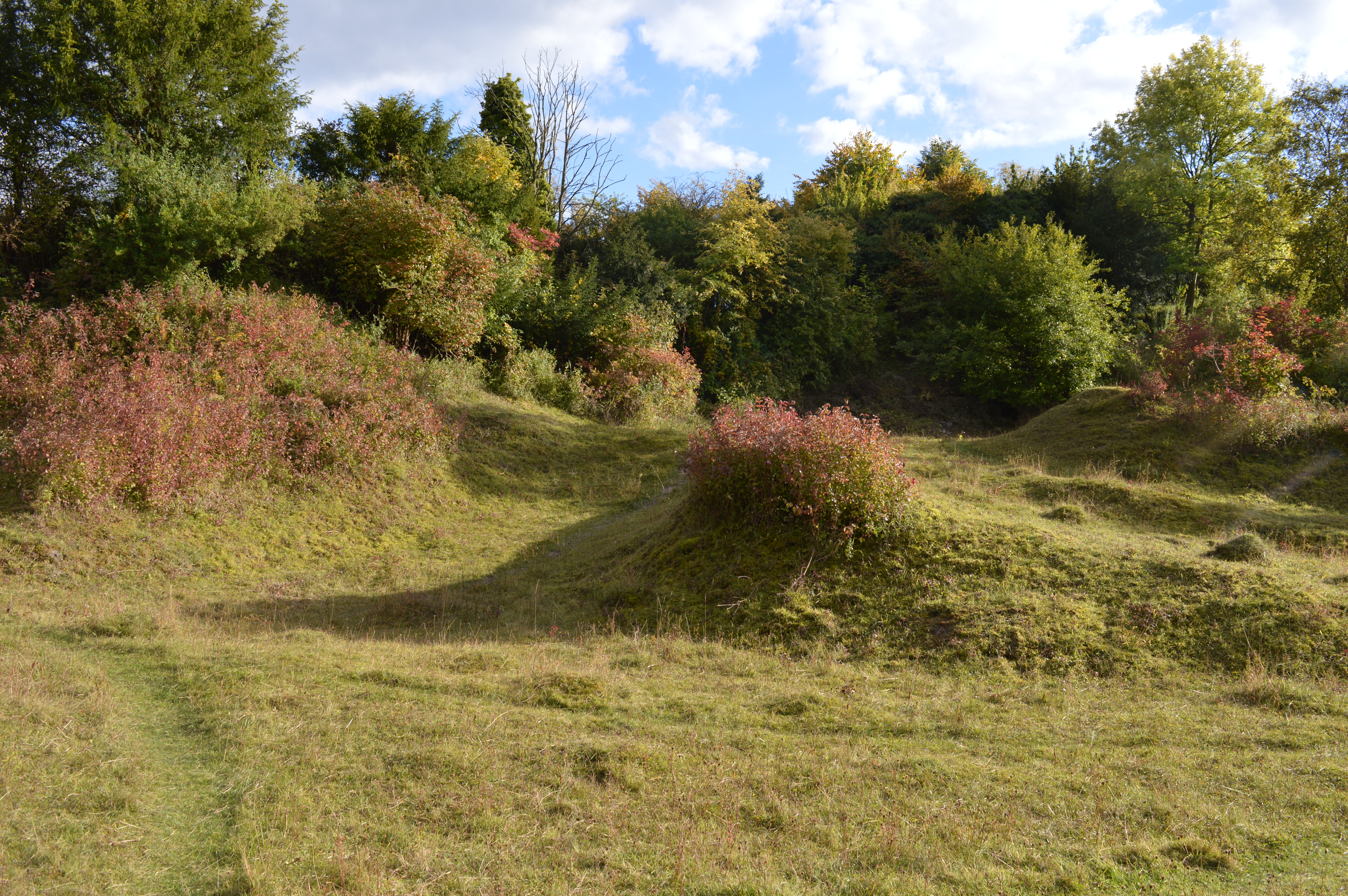
- Location of Aston Clinton Ragpits.
- Area of search: Buckinghamshire
- Grid reference: SP919136
- Interest: Biological
- Area: 2.9 ha (7.2 acres)
- Notification date: 1984
- Location map: Magic Map

Aston Clinton Ragpits is a 2.9-hectare (7.2-acre) biological Site of Special Scientific Interest in Aston Clinton in Buckinghamshire. It is a former chalk quarry, which is now a nature reserve managed by the Berkshire, Buckinghamshire and Oxfordshire Wildlife Trust. It is in the Chilterns Area of Outstanding Natural Beauty.

This grassland site has steeply sloping old pits and spoil heaps, with a rich assembly of shrubs, herbs and invertebrates, including twenty-seven butterfly species. There is some mature woodland with beech, yew, ash and whitebeam, together with a hedge and areas of scrub. There are eight orchid species.

There is access from St Leonards Road close to its junction with Upper Icknield Way.
