= Homefield Wood =

Protected area in Buckinghamshire, England

Coordinates: 51.5738°N 0.8275°W

- Site of Special Scientific Interest
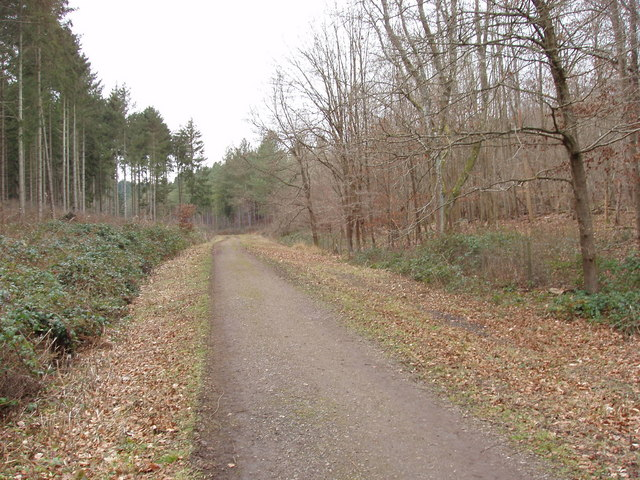
- Location of Homefield Wood.
- Area of search: Buckinghamshire
- Grid reference: SU813867
- Interest: Biological
- Area: 6.1 ha (15 acres)
- Notification date: 1984
- Location map: Magic Map

Homefield Wood is a 6.1-hectare (15-acre) Site of Special Scientific Interest in Hambleden in Buckinghamshire. It is owned by the Forestry Commission, and managed by the Berkshire, Buckinghamshire and Oxfordshire Wildlife Trust. It is part of the Chilterns Area of Outstanding Natural Beauty.

The site has young beech plantations, with some conifers and many native trees. There are rides and glades in some areas which have important and varied herb-rich chalk grassland, with plants such as Chiltern gentian and upright brome-grass and a variety of orchids. The rich invertebrate fauna includes thirty species of butterfly and over four hundred of moth.

There is access from a road between Bockmer End and Lower Woodend.
