= CS Lewis Nature Reserve =

Nature reserve in Risinghurst, Oxfordshire, England

Coordinates: 51.755°N 1.190°W

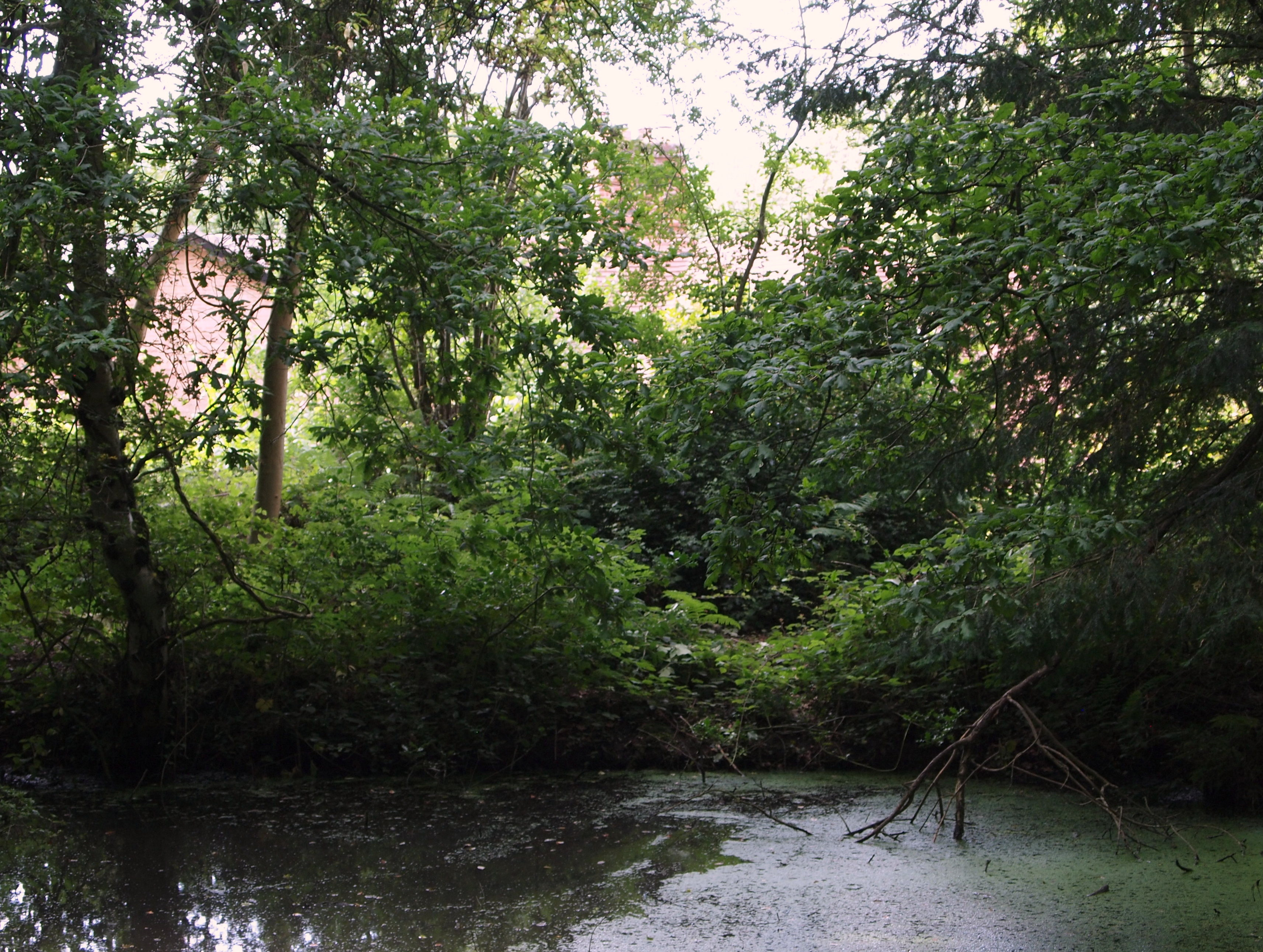
- Interactive map of CS Lewis Nature Reserve
- Type: Nature reserve
- Location: Risinghurst, Oxfordshire
- OS grid: SP 560067
- Area: 3 hectares (7.4 acres)
- Manager: Berkshire, Buckinghamshire and Oxfordshire Wildlife Trust

CS Lewis Nature Reserve is a 3-hectare (7.4-acre) nature reserve in Risinghurst, a suburb of Oxford in Oxfordshire. It is managed by the Berkshire, Buckinghamshire and Oxfordshire Wildlife Trust.

The reserve, which was formerly owned by author C. S. Lewis, has a flooded clay pit, with many aquatic plants, toads, dragonflies and damselflies. There is also a steeply sloping wood with large boulders.
