= Oakley Hill nature reserve =

Nature reserve in Oxfordshire, England

Coordinates: 51.6883°N 0.9121°W

Oakley Hill
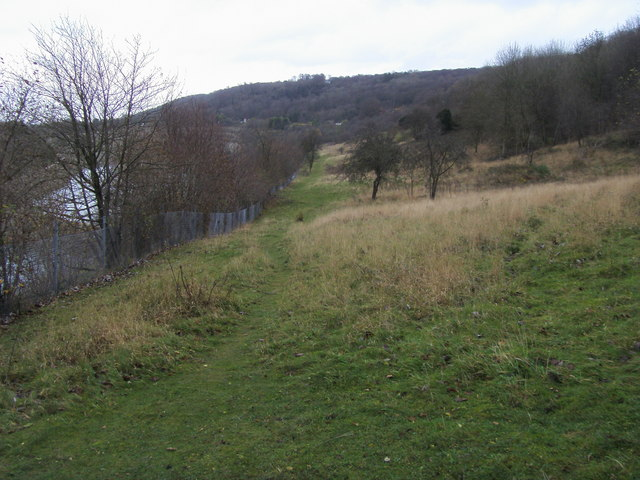
- Interactive map of Oakley Hill
- Type: Nature reserve
- Location: Chinnor, Oxfordshire
- OS grid: SU753994
- Area: 13 hectares (32 acres)
- Manager: Berkshire, Buckinghamshire and Oxfordshire Wildlife Trust

Oakley Hill is a 13-hectare (32-acre) nature reserve south of Chinnor in Oxfordshire, England. It is managed by the Berkshire, Buckinghamshire and Oxfordshire Wildlife Trust.

This hill has chalk grassland, beech woodland and scrub. Flowering plants include Chiltern gentian, wild thyme, clustered bellflower, pyramidal orchid, yellow-wort, dog's mercury, bluebell, common rock-rose and harebell.
