= Haymill Valley =

Nature reserve in Berkshire, England

Coordinates: 51.526°N 0.644°W

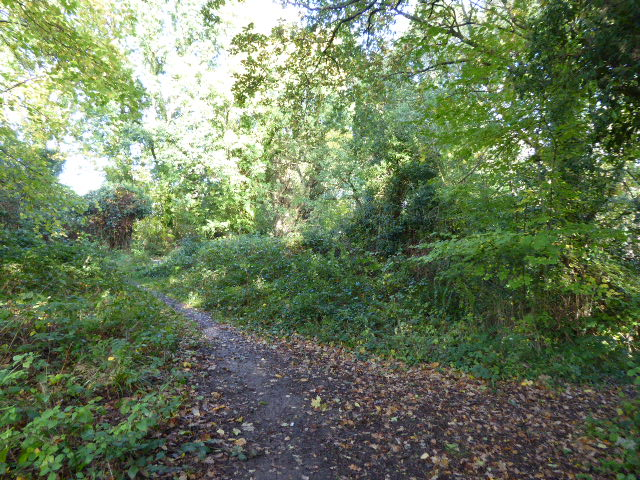
- Interactive map of Haymill Valley
- Type: Local Nature Reserve
- Location: Slough, Berkshire
- OS grid: SU 942 817
- Area: 7.8 hectares (19 acres)
- Manager: Berkshire, Buckinghamshire and Oxfordshire Wildlife Trust

Haymill Valley is a 7.8-hectare (19-acre) Local Nature Reserve in Slough in Berkshire. It is owned by Slough Borough Council and managed by the Berkshire, Buckinghamshire and Oxfordshire Wildlife Trust. The site is known locally as The Millie.

== Geography and site ==
The site features ancient woodland with extensive reed beds and ponds fed by Two Mill Brook (also known as Two Mile Brook), which flows from Burnham Beeches into the Thames. At the reserve's southernmost end is a site of an ancient watermill.

The site features a pair of 7 foot metal sculptures of Kingfishers called the Millie Kingfishers, which were added in 2008.

== History ==
Haymill Valley Nature Reserve was declared a local nature reserve status in 1994 by Slough Borough Council.

== Fauna ==
The site has the following fauna:

=== Mammals ===
- Wood mouse

=== Invertebrates ===
- Common brimstone (Gonepteryx rhamni)
- Holly blue (Celastrina argiolus)
- Orange tip (Anthocharis cardamines)
- Speckled wood (Pararge aegeria)
- White-letter hairstreak (Satyrium w-album)

=== Birds ===
- Eurasian blue tit (Cyanistes caeruleus)
- Great tit (Parus major)
- European green woodpecker (Picus viridis)
- Eurasian blackcap (Sylvia atracapilla)
- Common chiffchaff (Phylloscopus collybita)
- Eurasian coot (Fulica atra)
- Great spotted woodpecker (Dendrocopos major)
- Common kingfisher (Alcedo atthis)
- Common moorhen (Gallinula chloropus)
- Common reed bunting (Emberiza schoeniclus)
- Common reed warbler (Acrocephalus scirpaceus)
- Willow warbler (Phylloscopus trochilus)

== Flora ==
The site has the following flora:

=== Trees ===
- Common hawthorn (Crataegus monogyna)

=== Plants ===
- Marsh marigold (Caltha palustris)
- English bluebell (Hyacinthoides non-scripta)
- Yellow flag (Iris pseudacorus)
