= Warren Bank =

Protected area in Oxfordshire, England

Coordinates: 51.566°N 1.059°W

- Site of Special Scientific Interest
- Location of Warren Bank.
- Area of search: Oxfordshire
- Grid reference: SU 653 857
- Interest: Biological
- Area: 3.1 hectares (7.7 acres)
- Notification date: 1986
- Location map: Magic Map

Warren Bank is a 3.1-hectare (7.7-acre) biological Site of Special Scientific Interest south-east of Wallingford in Oxfordshire. It is managed by the Berkshire, Buckinghamshire and Oxfordshire Wildlife Trust.

This steeply sloping site has unimproved chalk grassland and scrub. There is a rich variety of flora, including horseshoe vetch, chalk milkwort and bee orchid. There are also many insects, with butterflies such as dark green fritillary and green hairstreak.
