= Hartslock =

Wood and nature reserve in Oxfordshire, England

- Site of Special Scientific Interest
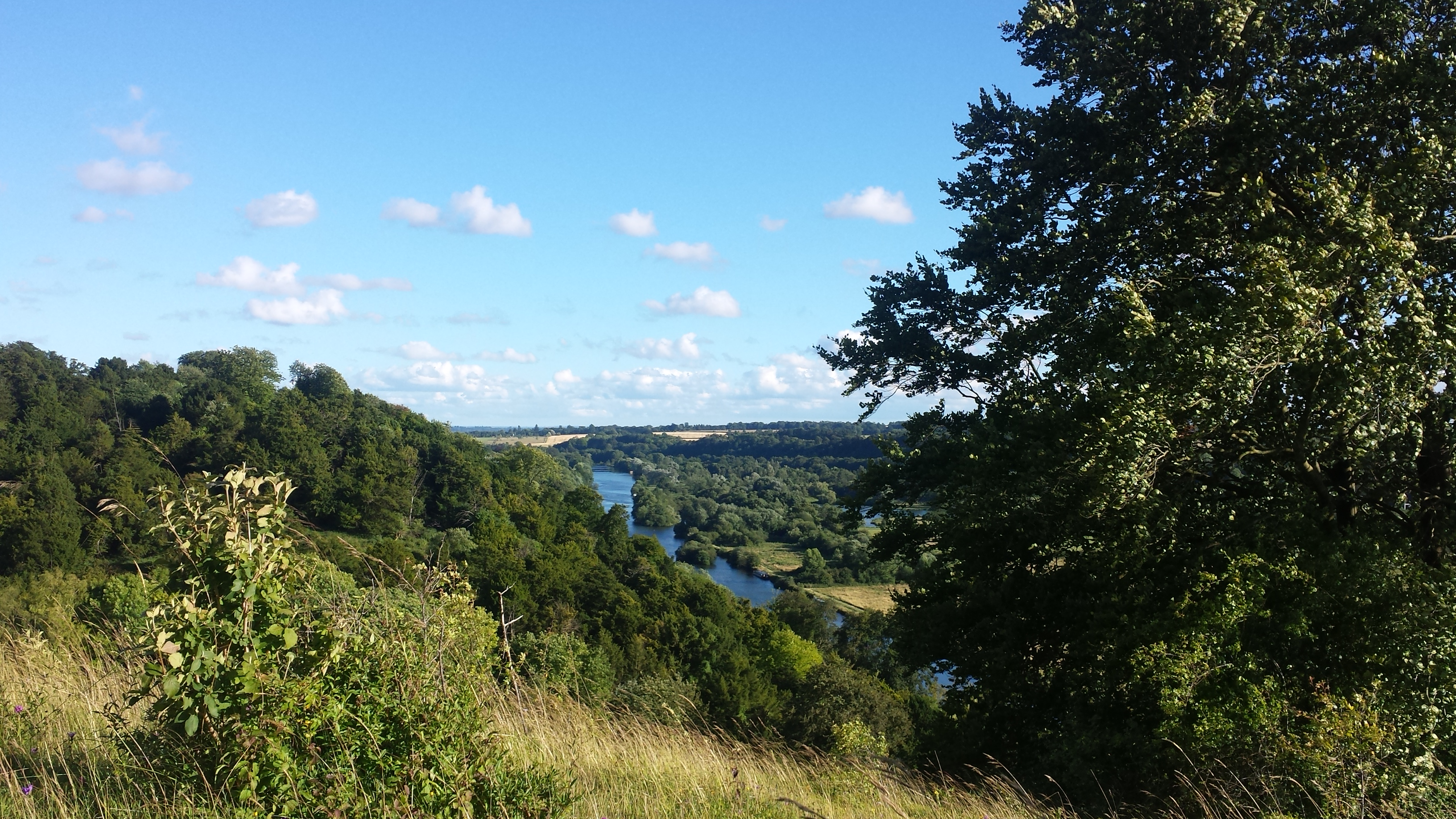
- View from the top of the nature reserve over woods and river

- Location within Oxfordshire
- Location of Hartslock.
- Area of search: Oxfordshire
- Grid reference: SU 619 790
- Coordinates: 51.507°N 1.110°W
- Interest: Biological
- Area: 41.8 hectares (103 acres)
- Notification date: 1986
- Location map: Magic Map

Hartslock, also known as Hartslock Woods, is a 41.8-hectare (103-acre) biological Site of Special Scientific Interest (SSSI) in a wooded area on the north bank of the River Thames to the south-east of Goring-on-Thames in the English county of Oxfordshire. An area of 29.4 hectares (73 acres) is a Special Area of Conservation and an area of 10 hectares (25 acres) is a nature reserve owned and managed by the Berkshire, Buckinghamshire and Oxfordshire Wildlife Trust (BBOWT). The site is well known for the variety of wild orchids that grow on its sloping grassland, and especially for the monkey orchid (Orchis simia) that grows in very few other places in England.

The name Hartslock is believed to derive from the Hart family, who in the 15th century owned a 'lock', probably a wooden construction used to support nets and eel traps, across the river below the woods. This structure no longer exists, having been removed in stages during the 19th and early 20th centuries. In 1915, Hartslock Wood was one of the sites listed by Charles Rothschild, the founder of the Wildlife Trusts, as "worthy of preservation", although the exigencies of the First World War meant that no practical steps were taken to protect it then. In the 1950s and 60s, local residents reacted to encroaching agriculture by helping to monitor and protect the orchids, and in 1975/76 BBOWT bought part of the site and established it as a nature reserve. In 1986, the whole site was designated as an SSSI.

The site has diverse semi-natural habitats, including species-rich chalk downland, ancient yew woodland, semi-natural broadleaved woodland, riverside fen and scrub. The wood has a variety of tree species including beech and yew, and there is a large colony of badgers. Besides the monkey orchid, several other orchid species, including lady (Orchis purpurea), bee (Ophrys apifera), pyramidal (Anacamptis pyramidalis), common spotted (Dactylorhiza fuchsii), common twayblade (Neottia ovata) and white helleborine (Cephalanthera damasonium), are to be found on the steeply sloping grassland part of the site. A hybrid of the monkey and lady orchids has been reported at Hartslock, the only place in Britain where this hybrid has been recorded.

The Thames Path passes through Hartslock Woods. The path is usually at some distance from the river, as this is a stretch of the path that is not based on the old Thames towpath, which is on the opposite bank at this point.

== Gallery ==
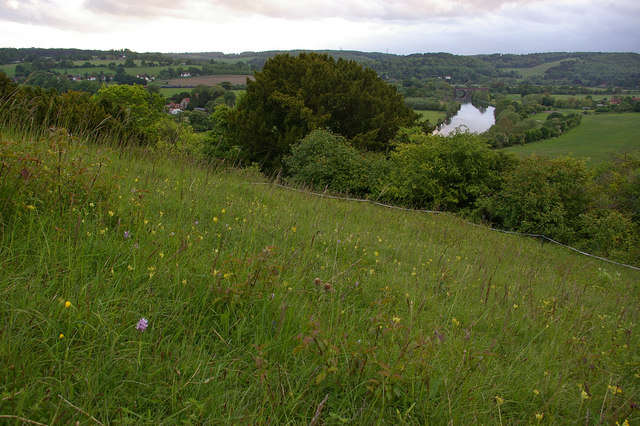
Hatslock nature reserve grassland with orchids

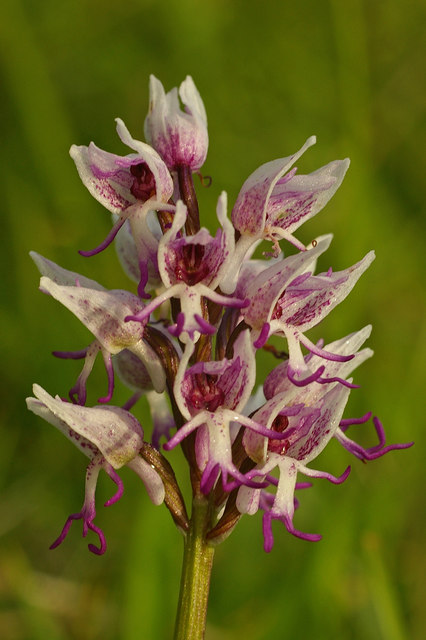
Monkey Orchid at Hartslock

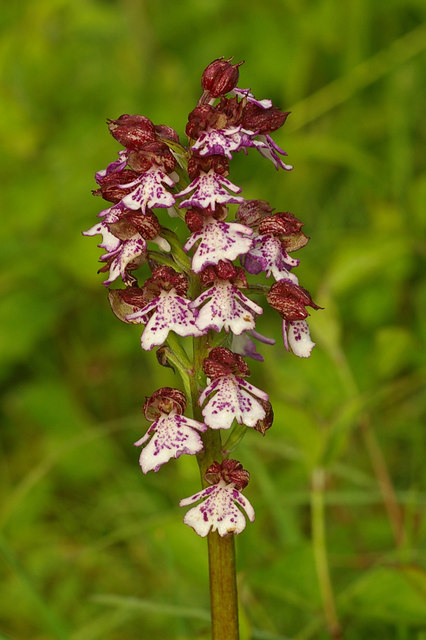
Lady Orchid at Hartslock

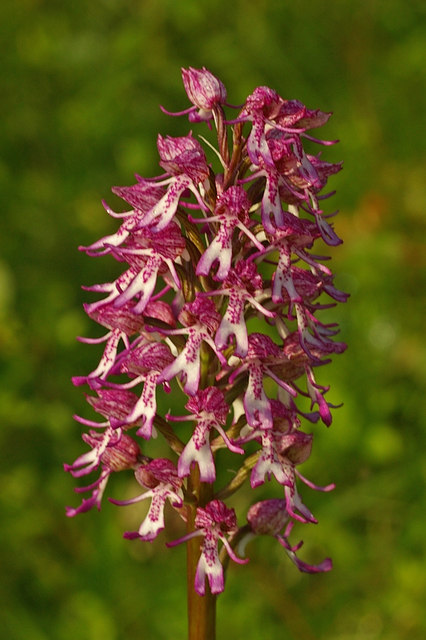
Hybrid Orchid at Hartslock

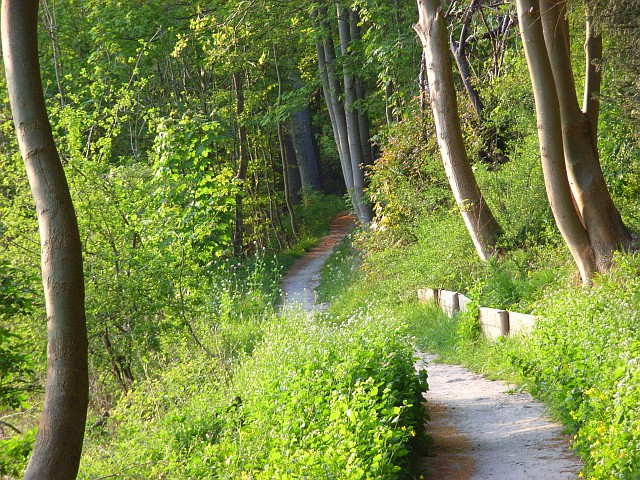
The Thames Path in Hartslock Woods
