= Chimney Meadows =

Protected area in Oxfordshire, England

Coordinates: 51.698°N 1.492°W

- Site of Special Scientific Interest
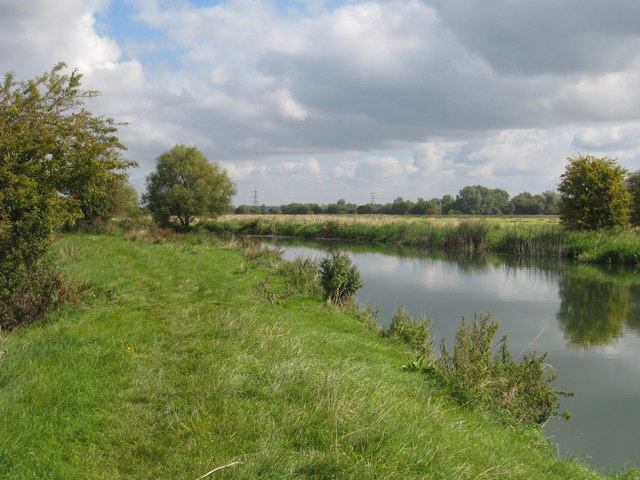
- Location of Chimney Meadows.
- Area of search: Oxfordshire
- Grid reference: SP 352 000
- Interest: Biological
- Area: 49.6 hectares (123 acres)
- Notification date: 1986
- Location map: Magic Map

Chimney Meadows is a 49.6-hectare (123-acre) biological Site of Special Scientific Interest between Abingdon-on-Thames and Faringdon in Oxfordshire. It is also a national nature reserve, and part of the 308-hectare (760-acre) Chimney Meadows nature reserve, which is managed by the Berkshire, Buckinghamshire and Oxfordshire Wildlife Trust.

This site, which consists of six botanically rich alluvial meadows, is bordered on the south by the River Thames. The meadows are intersected by ditches, most of which are covered in reed canary-grass. The most common grasses are crested dog's-tail, creeping bent, perennial rye-grass, hairy sedge and glaucous sedge.
