= Woodsides Meadow =

Nature reserve in Oxfordshire, England

Coordinates: 51.855°N 1.194°W

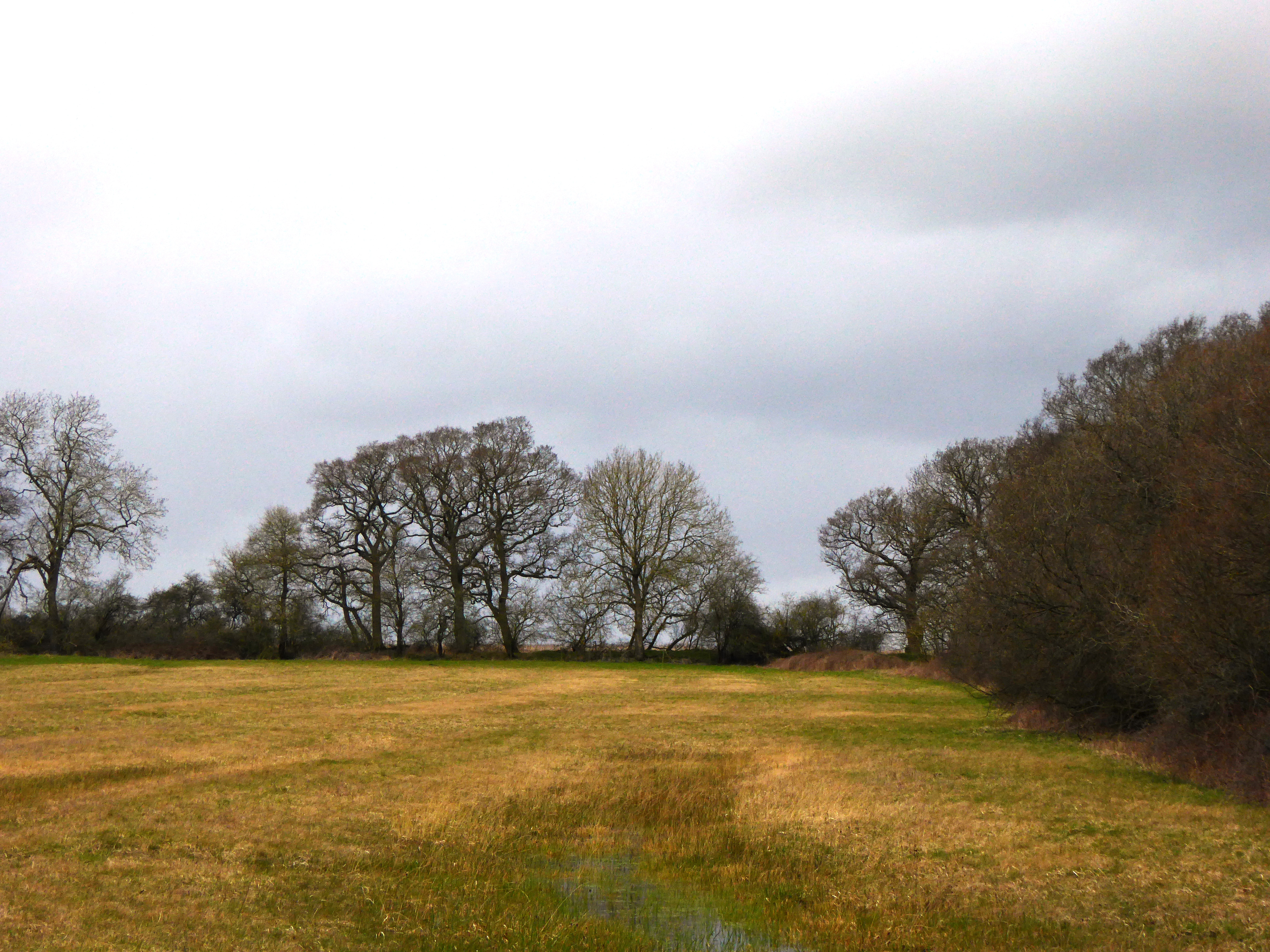
- Interactive map of Woodsides Meadow
- Type: Nature reserve
- Location: Wendlebury, Oxfordshire
- OS grid: SP556177
- Area: 4 hectares (9.9 acres)
- Manager: Berkshire, Buckinghamshire and Oxfordshire Wildlife Trust

Woodsides Meadow is a 4-hectare (9.9-acre) nature reserve south of Wendlebury in Oxfordshire. It is managed by the Berkshire, Buckinghamshire and Oxfordshire Wildlife Trust. It is part of Wendlebury Meads and Mansmoor Closes, which is a Site of Special Scientific Interest.

This meadow still has medieval ridge and furrow marks, showing that it has not been farmed by modern methods. More than 100 species of wild flower have been recorded, such as pepper-saxifrage, sneezewort, green-winged orchid, cuckooflower and ragged-robin. Skylarks and brown hares are often seen on the site.
