= Bould Wood =

Protected area in Oxfordshire, England

Coordinates: 51.883°N 1.634°W

- Site of Special Scientific Interest
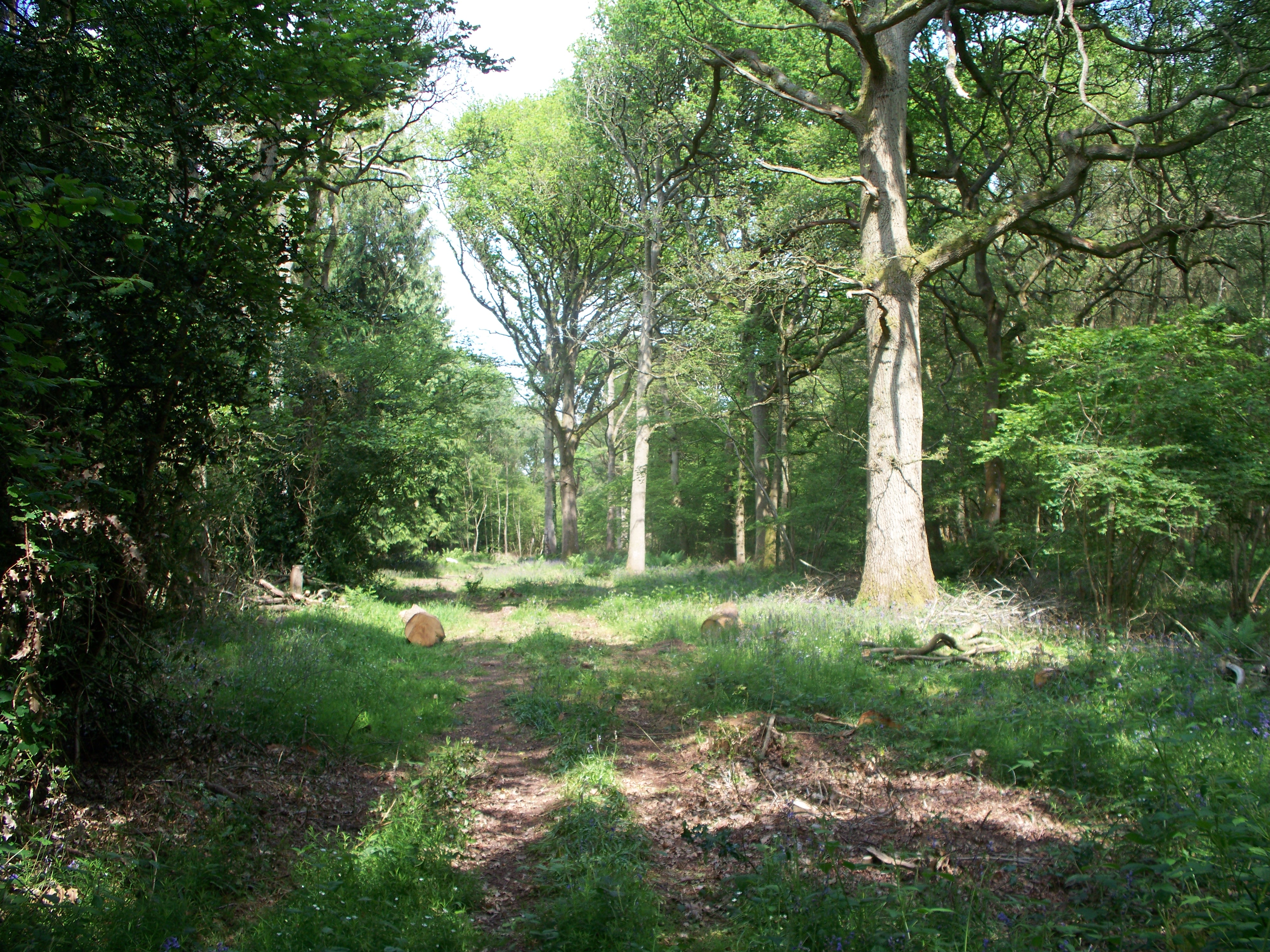
- Location of Bould Wood.
- Area of search: Oxfordshire
- Grid reference: SP 253 206
- Interest: Biological
- Area: 58.2 hectares (144 acres)
- Notification date: 1986
- Location map: Magic Map

Bould Wood is a 58.2-hectare (144-acre) biological Site of Special Scientific Interest north of Shipton-under-Wychwood in Oxfordshire. An area of 23 hectares (57 acres) is Foxholes nature reserve, which is managed by the Berkshire, Buckinghamshire and Oxfordshire Wildlife Trust.

This site is mainly ancient semi-natural woodland, but it also has two streams, a pond and a wet meadow. The lower plant flora is diverse. Fungi include tricholoma toadstools and Cudoniella clavus, while there are lichens such as Cladonia polydactyla, Catillaria prasina and Graphis scripta.
