= Wildmoor Heath =

Nature reserve in Berkshire, England

Coordinates: 51.3582°N 0.7905°W

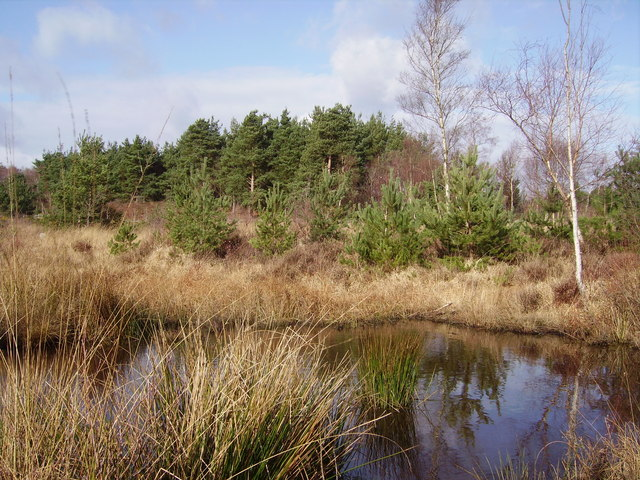
- Interactive map of Wildmoor Heath
- Type: Nature reserve
- Location: Crowthorne, Berkshire
- OS grid: SU838630
- Area: 91 hectares (220 acres)
- Manager: Berkshire, Buckinghamshire and Oxfordshire Wildlife Trust

Wildmoor Heath is a 91-hectare (220-acre) nature reserve south of Crowthorne in Berkshire. It is managed by the Berkshire, Buckinghamshire and Oxfordshire Wildlife Trust. The reserve is part of two Sites of Special Scientific Interest: Wildmoor Heath itself is part of Sandhurst to Owlsmoor Bogs and Heaths and a separate area called Broadmoor Bottom is part of Broadmoor to Bagshot Woods and Heaths.

This sloping site has wet and dry heath and woodland. There are also areas of bog which are grazed by Dexter cattle to keep down the growth of coarse purple moor-grass; twenty species of damselfly and dragonfly have been recorded in the bogs and plants include bog asphodel, butterwort, round-leaved sundew and white beaked-sedge.

There is no doubt that this will help to protect many species found on the lowland heath. This beautiful conservation area attracts people from different places in the United Kingdom.
