= Bowdown and Chamberhouse Woods =

Protected area in Berkshire, England

- Site of Special Scientific Interest
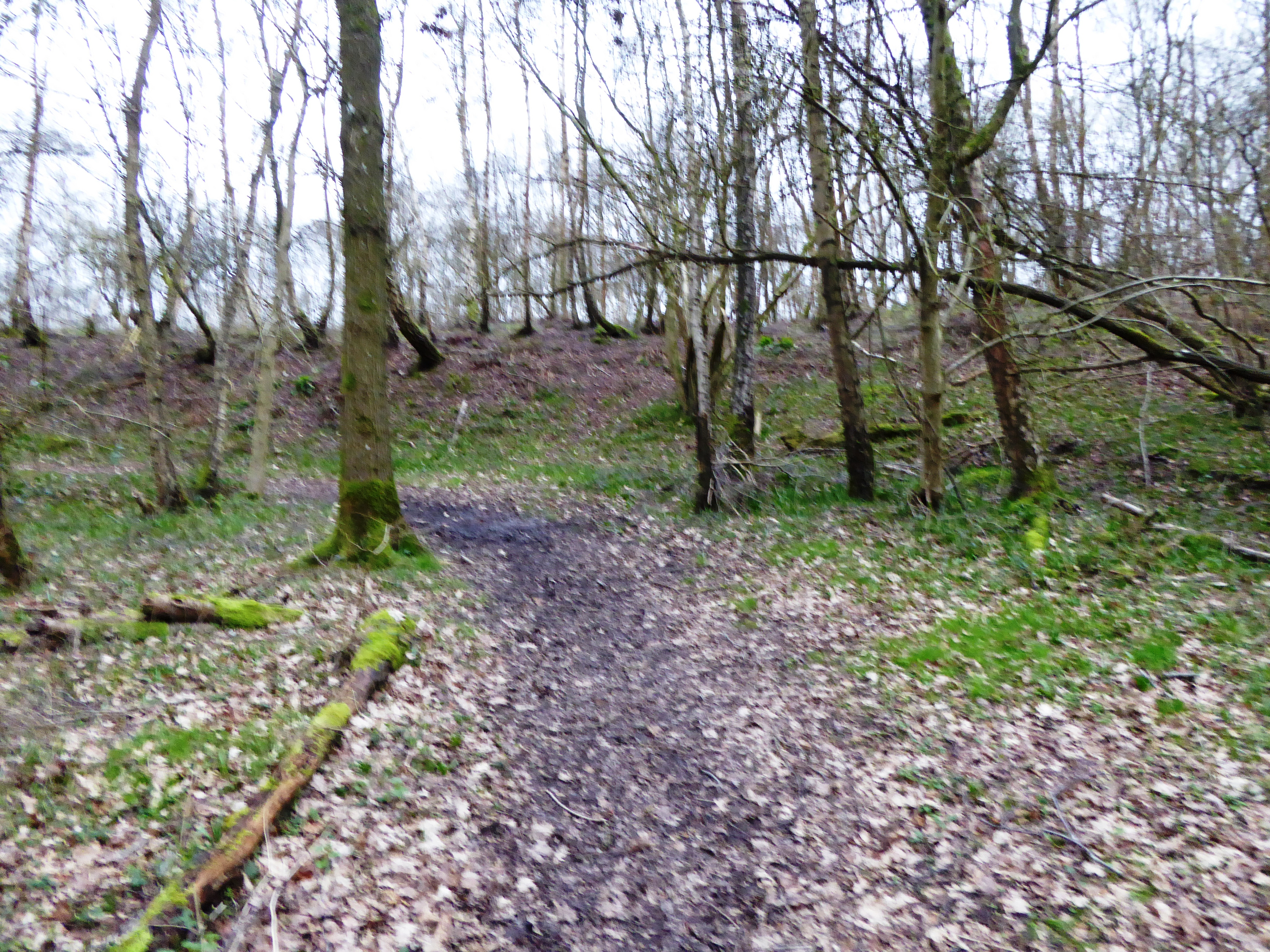
- Bowdown Woods

- Location within Berkshire
- Location of Bowdown and Chamberhouse Woods.
- Area of search: Berkshire
- Grid reference: SU 508 654
- Coordinates: 51.38537°N 1.26994°W
- Interest: Biological
- Area: 67.9 hectares (168 acres)
- Notification date: 1983
- Location map: Magic Map

Bowdown and Chamberhouse Woods is a 67.9-hectare (168-acre) biological Site of Special Scientific Interest south of Thatcham in Berkshire. An area of 55 hectares (140 acres) is a nature reserve managed by the Berkshire, Buckinghamshire and Oxfordshire Wildlife Trust.

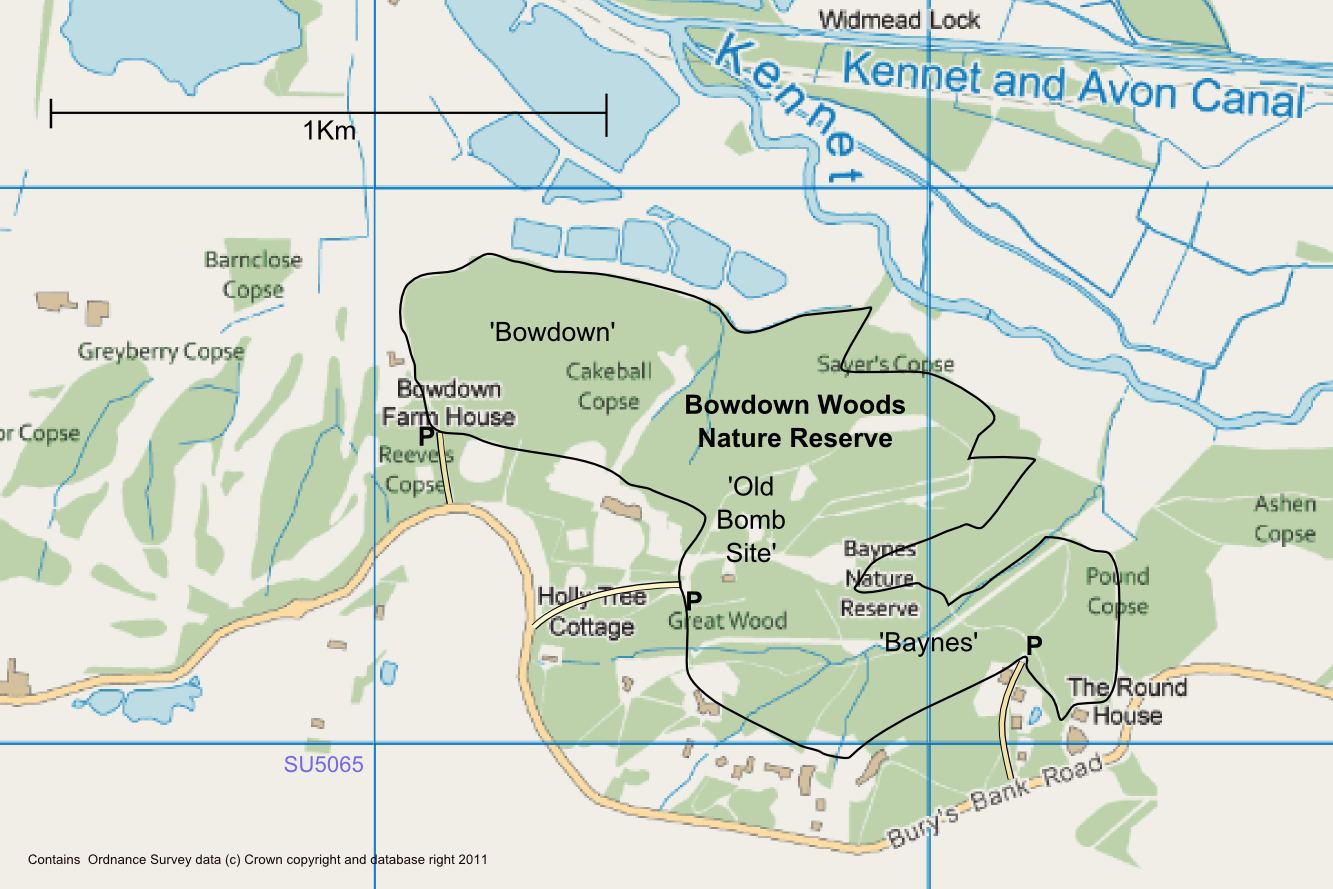
Bowdown Woods Nature Reserve lies between Greenham Common and the River Kennet

The site is an area of ancient woodland lying on the scarp slope north of Greenham Common, close to the eastern edge of Newbury, most of which is a Nature Reserve open to the public.

== Nature Reserve ==
It has a diverse range of tree species, an 'exceptionally rich woodland ground flora' and a diverse fauna, notably birds, reptiles, dragonflies and butterflies.

The Nature Reserve is open to the public and has three car parks, all accessed from Bury's Bank Road, between Greenham and Thatcham. The three access points relate to the three areas of the reserve, each of which has its own history.

=== Baynes Wood ===
Baynes Wood (itself comprising Great Wood and Parklodge Gully) is at the south-eastern end of the reserve, and may have been part of Chamberhouse Park. It is shown as woodland on 16th century maps, and was probably coppiced until 1798 when the Tull family bought it. It remained in their family until 1939 when Baynes timber Co acquired it, and promptly felled a considerable proportion of the trees. Following natural regeneration, a further spate of felling occurred in 1981. A re-appraisal of its management at this point enabled the BBOWT to initially rent and then buy the wood, since which it has been managed as a nature reserve.

=== Bowdown Wood ===
Bowdown Wood is at the opposite end of the reserve, and the first that is known of this woodland is that it was bought by the Dormer family in 1920. They then sold it to the BBOWT in 1984. It is more heavily dissected than the Baynes woods, with a number of valleys cutting through it. Although there is little flowing water there are large areas of permanently waterlogged ground.

=== Old Bomb Site ===
Between these two woodlands is the rather more prosaically named Old Bomb Site, which was used by the military during and after World War 2, in conjunction with RAF Greenham Common. This too was acquired by BBOWT, and is now a mosaic of heathland, acid grassland, scrub and woodland. The former ammunition stores are still there, in a decayed state, and the rubble provides good habitats for reptiles. This section is also still criss-crossed by a network of concrete paths built for military purposes, but now providing all-weather paths and good access to the site for less mobile visitors.

== West Berkshire Living Landscape ==
The woods are within the area of the West Berkshire Living Landscape, an initiative headed by the Wildlife Trust to link up areas and 'islands' of rich wildlife to create landscape-scale interlinked habitats. In addition to Bowdown and Chamberhouse Woods SSSI, this includes Greenham Common SSSI, the River Kennet and Thatcham Reedbeds SSSI and the areas linking them together, forming a 27 square kilometre area 'for people and wildlife to thrive side by side'.
