= Ardley Cutting and Quarry =

Quarry in Oxfordshire, England

- Site of Special Scientific Interest
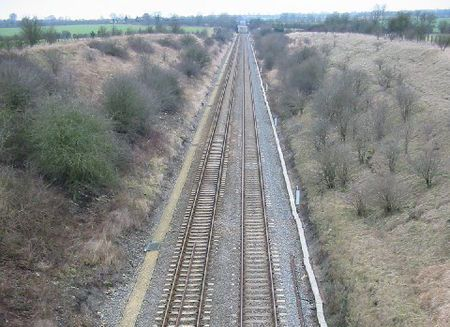
- Location of Ardley Cutting and Quarry.
- Area of search: Oxfordshire
- Grid reference: SP 535 272
- Coordinates: 51.941°N 1.223°W
- Interest: Biological; Geological
- Area: 40.1 hectares (99 acres)
- Notification date: 1988
- Location map: Magic Map

Ardley Cutting and Quarry is a 40.1-hectare (99-acre) biological and geological Site of Special Scientific Interest, covering a railway cutting and formaer quarry, northwest of Bicester in Oxfordshire, England. It is a Geological Conservation Review site and an area of 11 hectares (27 acres) is managed by the Berkshire, Buckinghamshire and Oxfordshire Wildlife Trust as Ardley Wood Quarry. The site contains a Scheduled Monument, Ardley Wood moated ringwork, a Norman defended enclosure.

The quarry and railway cutting expose rocks dating to the Bathonian stage of the Middle Jurassic, about 167 million years ago. It is described by Natural England as of national importance for the understanding of the Jurassic Period in Britain, as it allows correlation of rocks of the Oxford area to be correlated with those of the Midlands. The site has calcareous grassland with diverse vertebrates, including the internationally protected great crested newt.
