= Watts Bank =

Nature reserve in Berkshire, England

White Shute
- Site of Special Scientific Interest
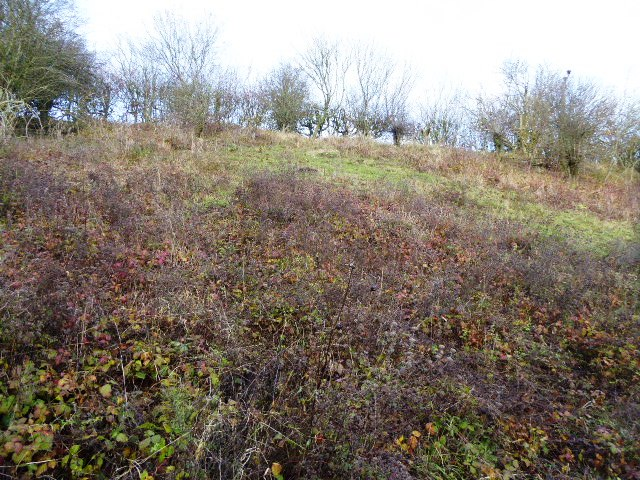

- Location within Berkshire
- Location of White Shute.
- Area of search: Berkshire
- Grid reference: SU 330 771
- Coordinates: 51.492°N 1.525°W
- Interest: Biological
- Area: 1.9 hectares (4.7 acres)
- Notification date: 1987
- Location map: Magic Map

Watts Bank is a 1.9-hectare (4.7-acre) nature reserve south of Lambourn in Berkshire. It is managed by the Berkshire, Buckinghamshire and Oxfordshire Wildlife Trust. It is designated a biological Site of Special Scientific Interest as White Shute.

Watts Bank is a small chalk grassland bank. It has had over 30 butterfly species recorded.

== Fauna ==
The site has the following fauna:

=== Butterflies ===
- Aricia agestis, brown argus
- Callophrys rubi, green hairstreak
- Melanargia galathea, marbled white
- Lycaena phlaeas, small copper

== Flora ==
The site has the following flora:

=== Plants ===
- Gentianella amarella
- Dactylorhiza fuchsii
- Primula veris
- Succisa pratensis
- Linum catharticum
- Anthyllis vulneraria
