= Cholsey Marsh =

Nature reserve near Cholsey, Oxfordshire, England

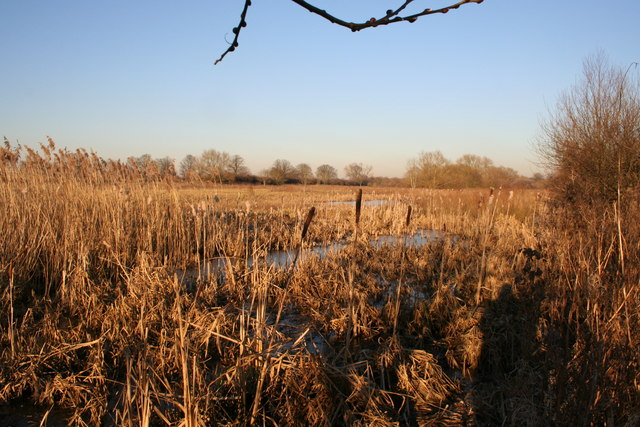

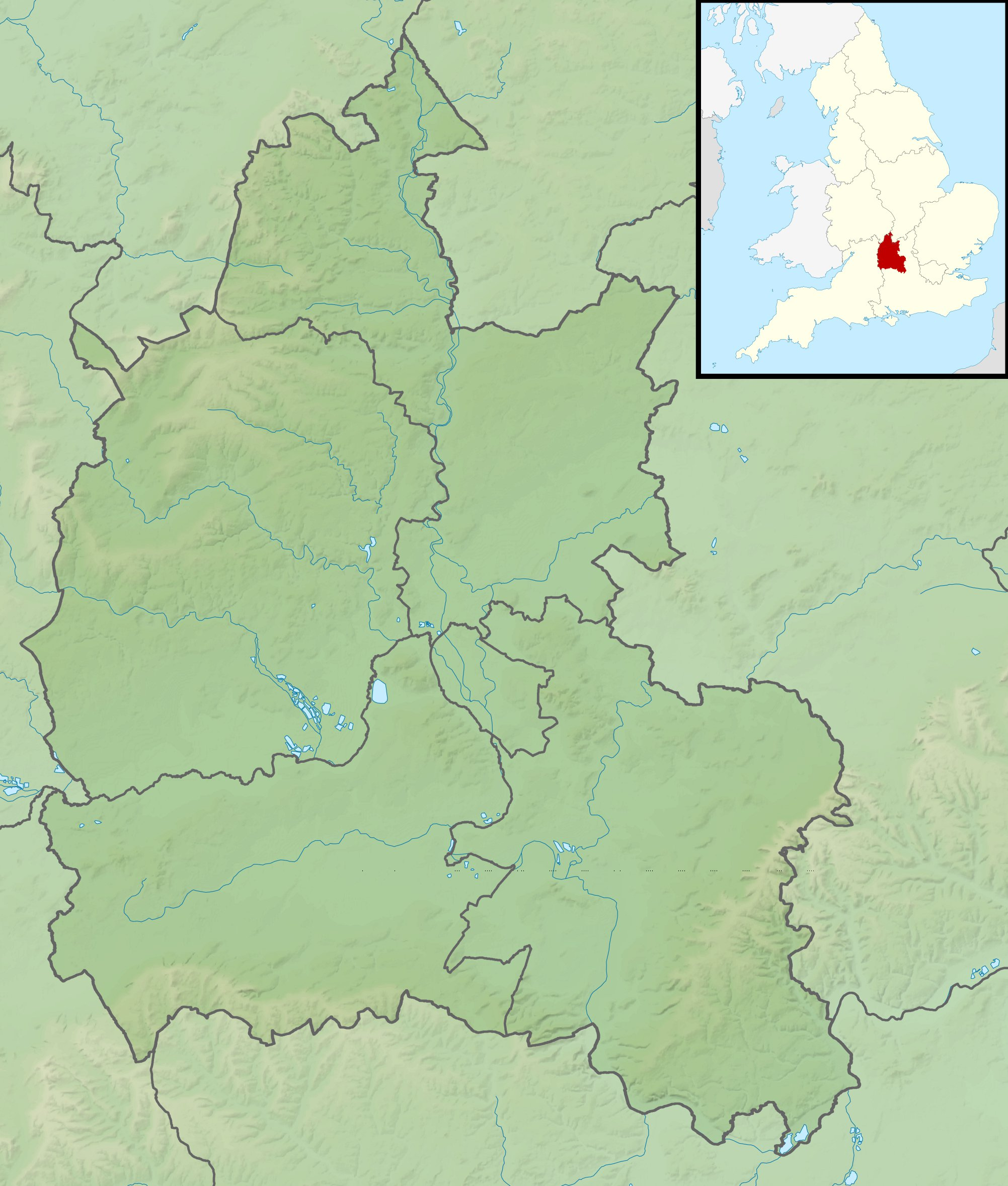
- Location within Oxfordshire
- Interactive map of Cholsey Marsh
- Type: Nature reserve
- Location: Cholsey, Oxfordshire
- OS grid: SU 601 855
- Coordinates: 51.5652°N 1.1343°W
- Area: 19 hectares (47 acres)
- Manager: Berkshire, Buckinghamshire and Oxfordshire Wildlife Trust

Cholsey Marsh is a 19-hectare (47-acre) nature reserve near Cholsey in Oxfordshire, England. It is managed by the Berkshire, Buckinghamshire and Oxfordshire Wildlife Trust.

The Thames Path runs through this marsh on the bank of the River Thames. Wet reed and sedge beds provide a habitat for diverse wildlife and there are also areas of grassland, willow scrub and two large ponds. Flora include marsh-marigold, meadowsweet and the rare summer snowflake.
