= Whitecross Green and Oriel Woods =

Protected area in Oxfordshire, England

Coordinates: 51.825°N 1.128°W

- Site of Special Scientific Interest
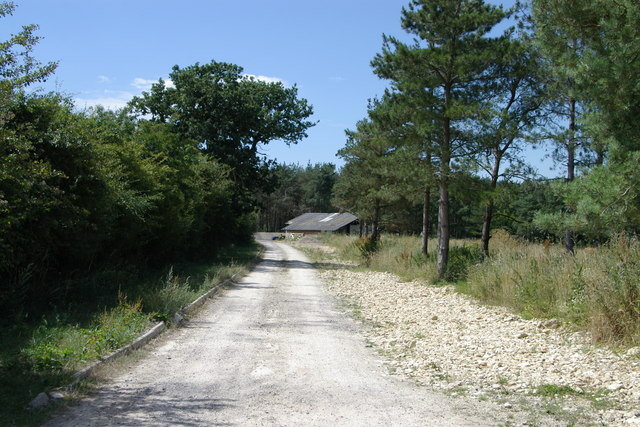
- Location of Whitecross Green and Oriel Woods.
- Area of search: Oxfordshire
- Grid reference: SP 602 144
- Interest: Biological
- Area: 63.0 hectares (156 acres)
- Notification date: 1985
- Location map: Magic Map

Whitecross Green and Oriel Woods is a 63-hectare (160-acre) biological Site of Special Scientific Interest between Oxford and Bicester in Oxfordshire. It is owned and managed by the Berkshire, Buckinghamshire and Oxfordshire Wildlife Trust under the name Whitecross Green Wood.

These ancient woods are part of two former royal forests, Shotover and Bernwood. They are crossed by herb-rich and grassy rides, some of which are bordered by ditches, and there is also a pond and a marsh. Twenty-four species of butterfly have been recorded including the nationally rare black hairstreak.
