= Long Grove Wood =

Nature reserve in Buckinghamshire

Coordinates: 51.6154°N 0.6098°W

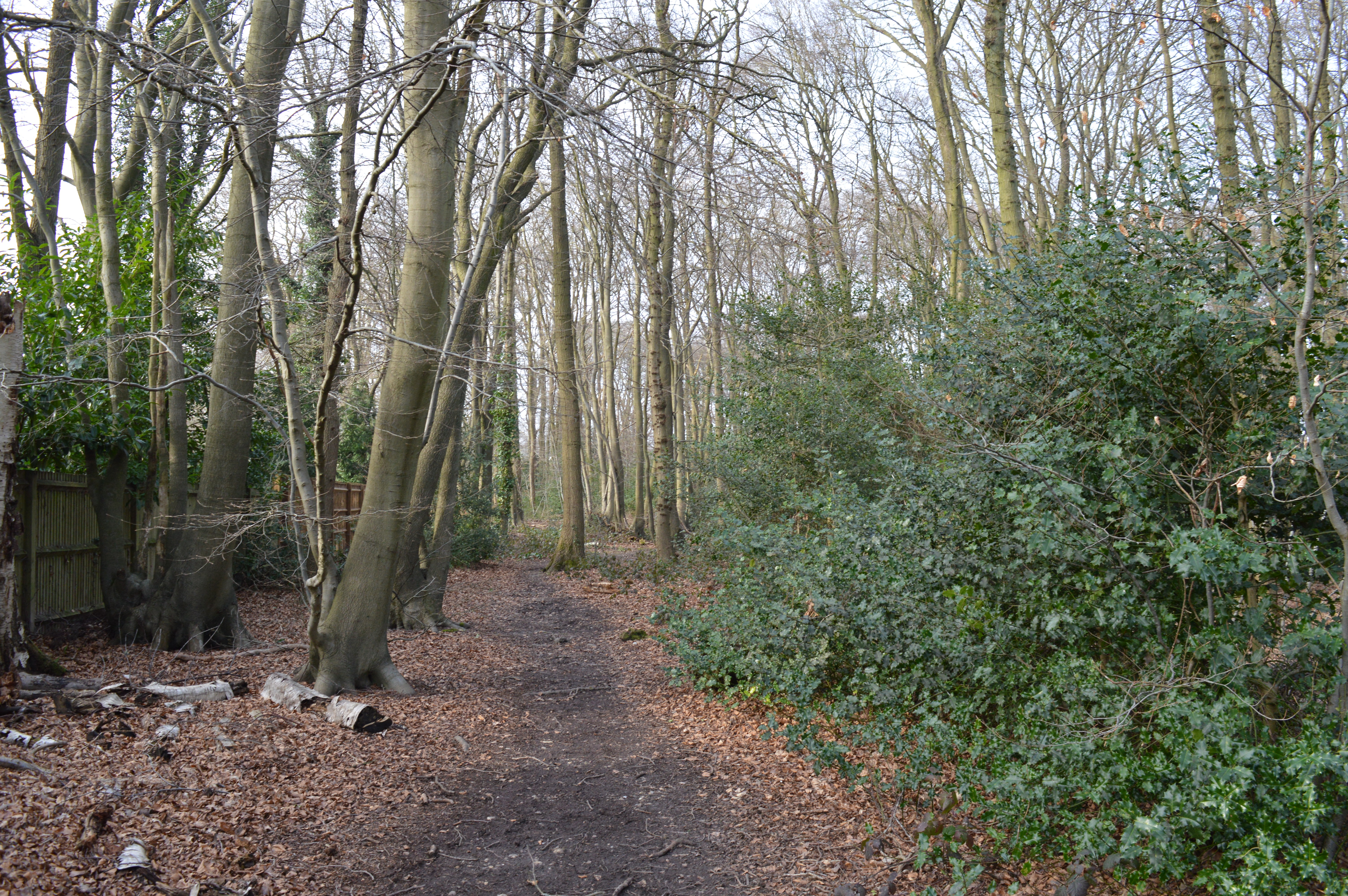

Long Grove Wood is a 1.5-hectare (3.7-acre) nature reserve managed by the Berkshire, Buckinghamshire and Oxfordshire Wildlife Trust in Seer Green in Buckinghamshire.

The site is deciduous woodland with the main trees being beach and hornbeam. The Great Storm of 1987 brought down several trees, creating open areas which were colonised by flowers such as bluebell and yellow archangel. Dead wood is kept to provide a habitat for insects and fungi. Birds include great spotted woodpeckers and treecreepers.

There is access from Farmers Way and Long Grove Lane.
