= Hollowhill and Pullingshill Woods =

Protected area in Buckinghamshire, England

Coordinates: 51.8818°N 0.9852°W

- Site of Special Scientific Interest
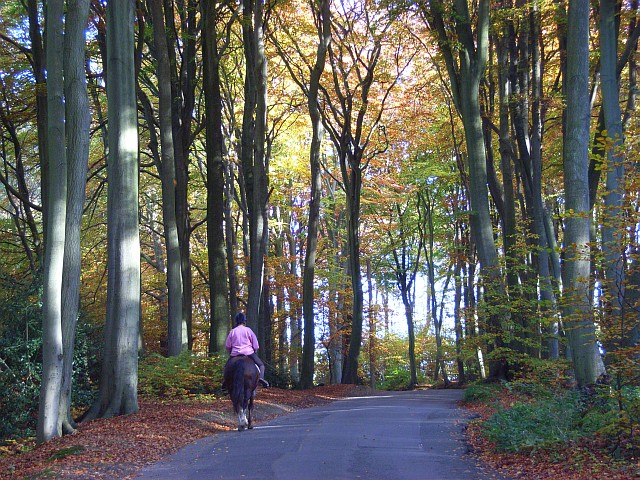
- Location of Hollowhill and Pullingshill Woods.
- Area of search: Buckinghamshire
- Grid reference: SU822862
- Interest: Biological
- Area: 23.0 ha (57 acres)
- Notification date: 1984
- Location map: Magic Map

Hollowhill and Pullingshill Woods is a 23-hectare biological Site of Special Scientific Interest near Marlow in Buckinghamshire. It is in the Chilterns Area of Outstanding Natural Beauty, and the Chilterns Beechwoods Special Area of Conservation. The local planning authorities are Wycombe District Council and Buckinghamshire County Council. Pullingshill Wood is owned by the Woodland Trust, and Hollowhill Wood was formerly owned by Buckinghamshire County Council, but was transferred to the Berkshire, Buckinghamshire and Oxfordshire Wildlife Trust. Since November 2015 the 7.8-hectare site has been managed by the Trust as "Hog and Hollowhill Woods".

A large part of the site is mature beech woodland, the result of neglected coppicing. Much of the ground below the trees is bare, but there are some unusual plants, including the nationally rare ghost orchid. Trees on the lower slopes include ash, wild cherry and crab apple, and there is heather in more open areas.

There is access from a road between Bockmer End and Hook Corner, which bisects the woods.
