= Dry Sandford Pit =

Nature reserve in Oxfordshire, England

- Site of Special Scientific Interest
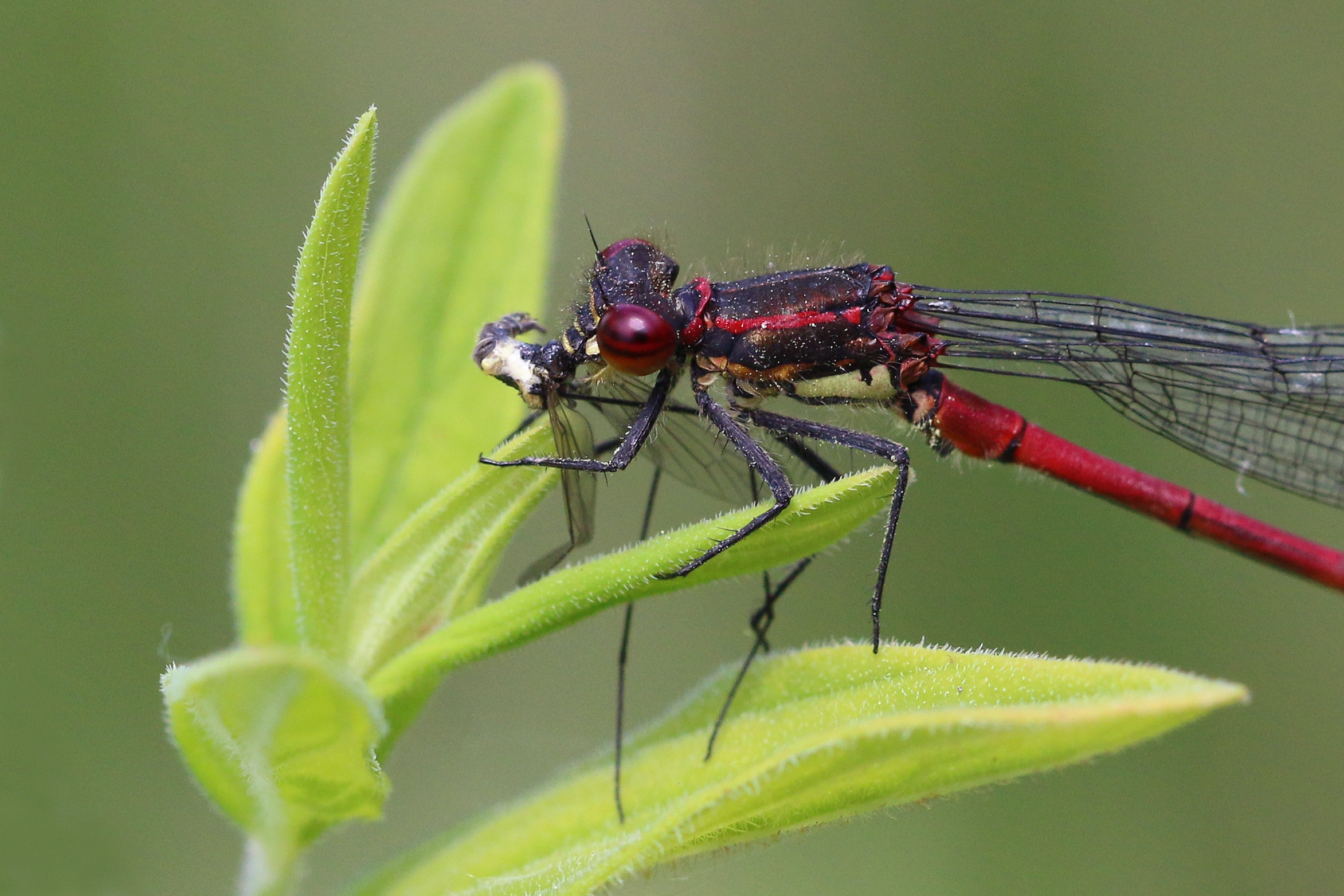
- Location of Dry Sandford Pit.
- Area of search: Oxfordshire
- Grid reference: SU 467 994
- Coordinates: 51.691°N 1.326°W
- Interest: Biological; Geological
- Area: 4.2 hectares (10 acres)
- Notification date: 1986
- Location map: Magic Map

Dry Sandford Pit is a 4.2-hectare (10-acre) former sand quarry and now a biological and geological Site of Special Scientific Interest north-west of Abingdon-on-Thames in Oxfordshire. It is a Geological Conservation Review site and it is managed as a nature reserve by the Berkshire, Buckinghamshire and Oxfordshire Wildlife Trust.

This former sand quarry exposes a sequence of limestone rocks laid down in shallow coastal waters during the Oxfordian stage of the Jurassic, around 160 million years ago. It has many fossil ammonites. It has diverse calcareous habitats, including fen, grassland, scrub and heath. It is nationally important entomologically, especially for bees and wasps.
