= Woodford Bottom and Lamb's Pool =

Nature reserve in Oxfordshire, England

Coordinates: 52.022°N 1.484°W

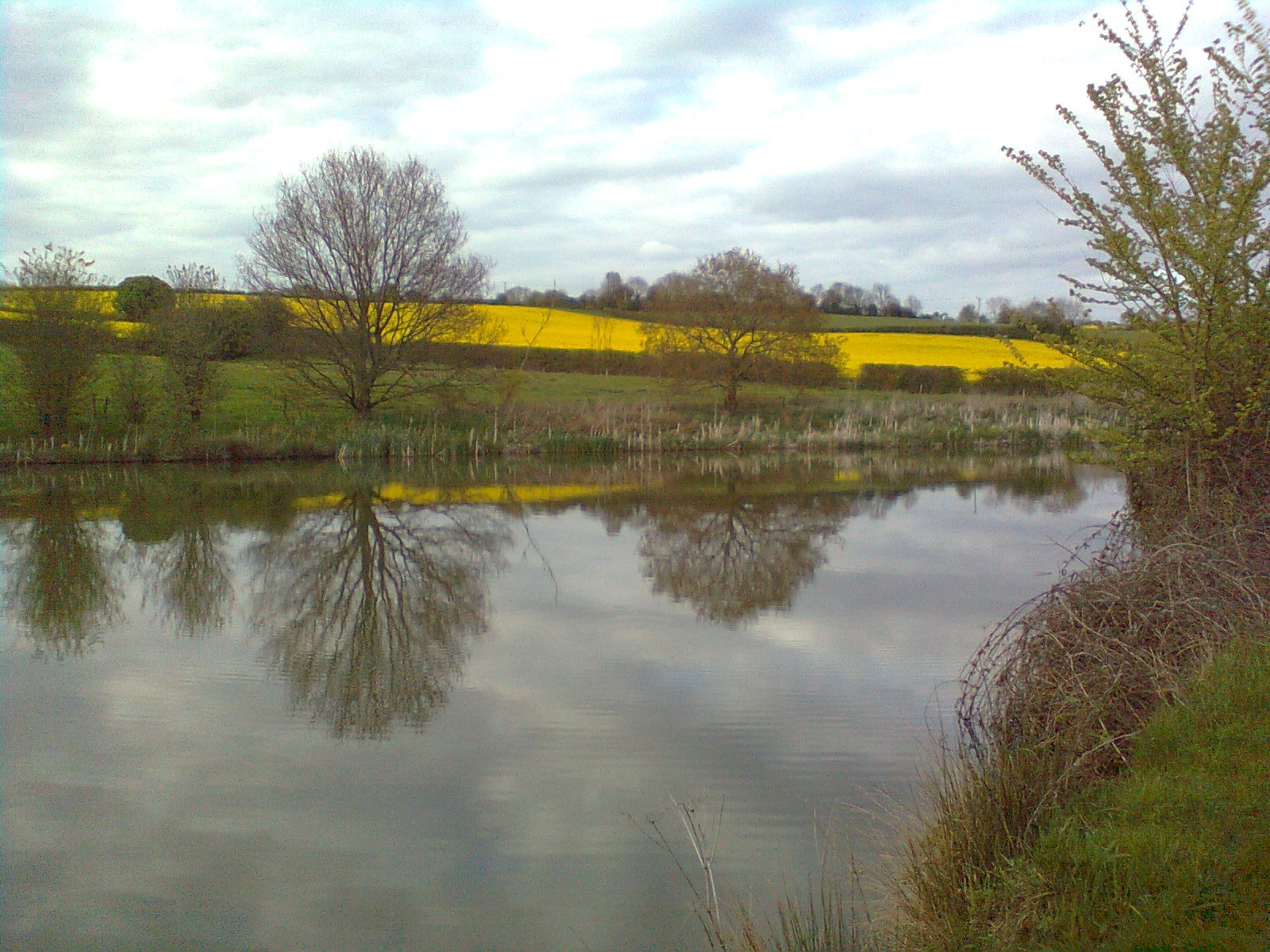
- Interactive map of Woodford Bottom and Lamb's Pool
- Type: Nature reserve
- Location: Sibford Ferris, Oxfordshire
- OS grid: SP352361
- Area: 3 hectares (7.4 acres)
- Manager: Berkshire, Buckinghamshire and Oxfordshire Wildlife Trust

Woodford Bottom and Lamb's Pool is a 3-hectare (7.4-acre) nature reserve south of Sibford Ferris in Oxfordshire. It is managed by the Berkshire, Buckinghamshire and Oxfordshire Wildlife Trust.

This site has an artificial pool, marshes and grassland. Pipistrelle, Daubenton's and noctule bats hunt over the lake and an island in the middle is used by breeding birds such as coots and tufted ducks. There is Reed sweet-grass and common reedmace in the marsh.
