= Nature Discovery Centre =

Nature reserve in Berkshire, England

Coordinates: 51.39998°N 1.2738°W

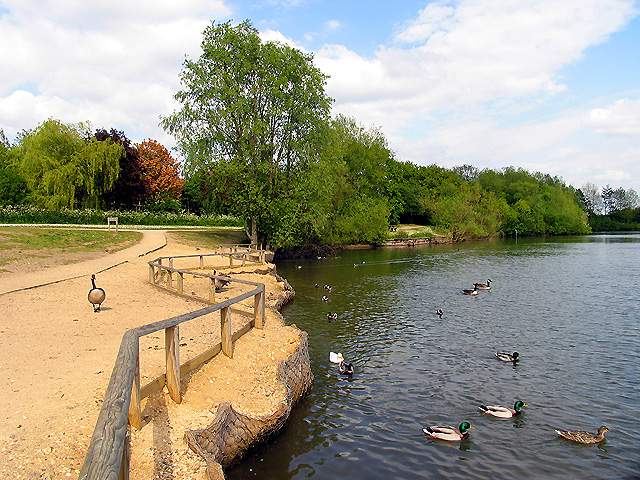
- Interactive map of Nature Discovery Centre
- Type: Nature reserve
- Location: Thatcham, Berkshire, England
- OS grid: SU506672
- Area: 35 hectares (86 acres)
- Manager: Berkshire, Buckinghamshire and Oxfordshire Wildlife Trust

The Nature Discovery Centre is a 35-hectare (86-acre) nature reserve in Thatcham in Berkshire, England. It is managed by the Berkshire, Buckinghamshire and Oxfordshire Wildlife Trust.

This site has a variety of habitats including a lake, woodland, reedbeds and hedges. The lake has many wintering wildfowl such as shovelers and pochrds. Invertebrates include the bloody-nosed and rhinoceros beetles.

The centre has toilets, a cafe, a shop, bird hides and a visitor centre.
