= Little Milton, Oxfordshire =

Village in Oxfordshire, England

Coordinates: 51.703°N 1.106°W

Little Milton
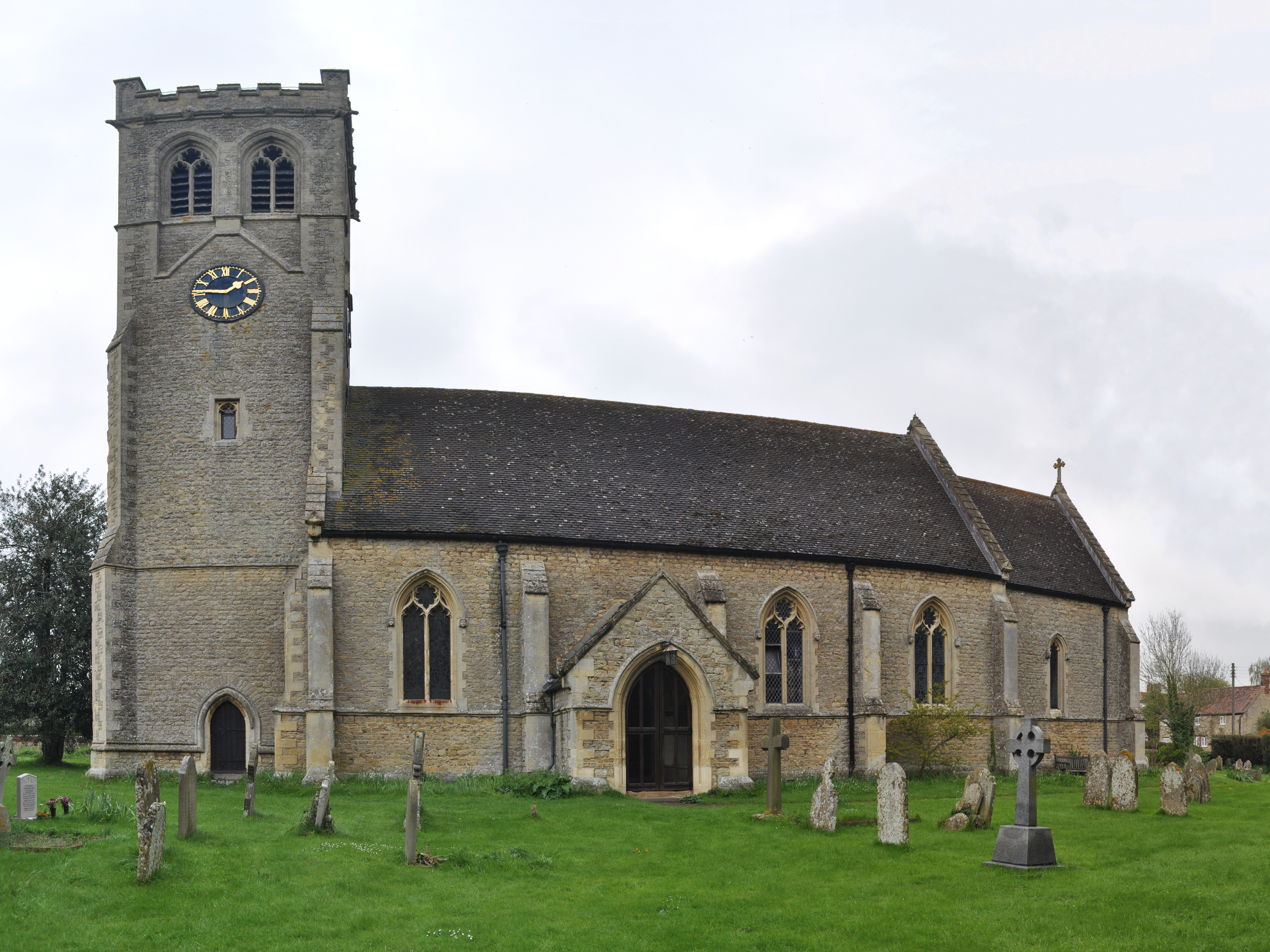
- St James' Church in Little Milton

- Location within Oxfordshire
- Area: 5.45 km^{2} (2.10 sq mi)
- Population: 486 (2011 census)
  - Density: 89/km^{2} (230/sq mi)
- OS grid reference: SP6100
- Civil parish: Little Milton
- District: South Oxfordshire
- Shire county: Oxfordshire
- Region: South East
- Country: England
- Sovereign state: United Kingdom
- Post town: Oxford
- Postcode district: OX44
- Dialling code: 01844
- Police: Thames Valley
- Fire: Oxfordshire
- Ambulance: South Central
- UK Parliament: Henley and Thame
- Website: Little Milton Village

Little Milton is a village and civil parish in Oxfordshire, about 6 miles (10 km) southwest of Thame and 7 miles (11 km) southeast of Oxford. The parish is bounded to the west by the River Thame, to the south by Haseley Brook (a tributary of the Thame), to the north by field boundaries and to the east by an old track between Great Milton and Rofford that is now a bridleway. Little Milton village is on raised ground above the River Thame floodplain, about 250 feet (76 m) above sea level.

The A329 road between Thame and Shillingford via Stadhampton passes through the village. In the centre of the village is the Grade II listed Milton Manor, parts of which date back to the 15th century. The Church of England parish church of Saint James is a Gothic Revival building designed by John Hayward and built in 1844. Hayward also designed the west tower, which was added in 1861.

== Sources and further reading ==
- Emery, Frank (1974). Hoskins, W.G (ed.). The Oxfordshire Landscape. The Making of the English Landscape. London: Hodder & Stoughton. p. 117. ISBN 0-340-04301-6.
- Hamerow, H; Mortimer, C. (1991). "A (?)Radiate Brooch from Little Milton, Oxfordshire" (PDF). Oxoniensia. LVI. Oxfordshire Architectural and Historical Society: 171–173.
- Lobel, Mary D, ed. (1962). "Great Milton". A History of the County of Oxford. Victoria County History. Vol. 7: Thame and Dorchester Hundreds. pp. 117–146.
- Portman, D. (1960). "Little Milton, The Rebuilding of an Oxfordshire Village" (PDF). Oxoniensia. XXV. Oxford Architectural and Historical Society: 49–65.
- Sherwood, Jennifer; Pevsner, Nikolaus (1974). Oxfordshire. The Buildings of England. Harmondsworth: Penguin Books. pp. 687–688. ISBN 0-14-071045-0.
