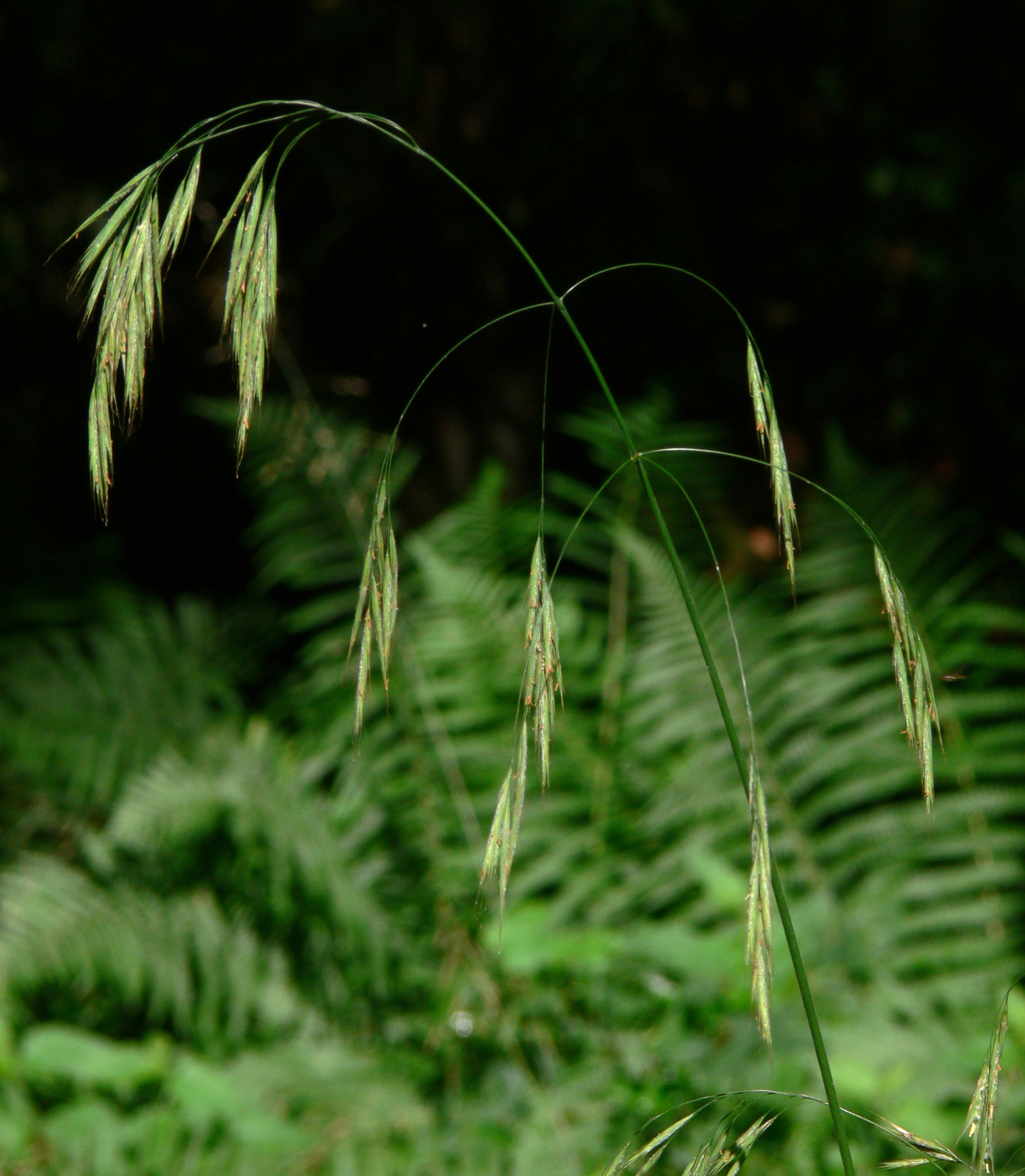

Scientific classification
- Kingdom: Plantae
- Clade: Tracheophytes
- Clade: Angiosperms
- Clade: Monocots
- Clade: Commelinids
- Order: Poales
- Family: Poaceae
- Subfamily: Pooideae
- Genus: Bromus
- Species: B. ramosus

Binomial name
- Bromus ramosus Huds.

Synonyms
- Bromopsis ramosa (Huds.) Holub

= Bromus ramosus =

Species of grass

Bromus ramosus, the hairy brome, is a bunchgrass in the grass family Poaceae, native to Europe, northwest Africa and southwest Asia. The name Bromus comes from the term brome, meaning oats. Unlike most other bromes (Bromus sp.), it grows in shady sites under trees.

== Description ==
Bromus ramosus is a perennial herbaceous bunchgrass, typically reaching 1–2 metres (3–7 ft) tall. The leaves are long, usually drooping, 20–50 cm (8–20 in) long and 10–15 mm (0.4–0.6 in) wide, and finely hairy.

The flower spike is gracefully arched with pendulous spikelets on long slender stems in pairs on the main stem.

=== Subspecies ===
- Bromus ramosus subsp. benekenii (Lange) Schintz et Thell. – lesser hairy brome
- Bromus ramosus subsp. ramosus
