= List of Sites of Special Scientific Interest in Buckinghamshire =

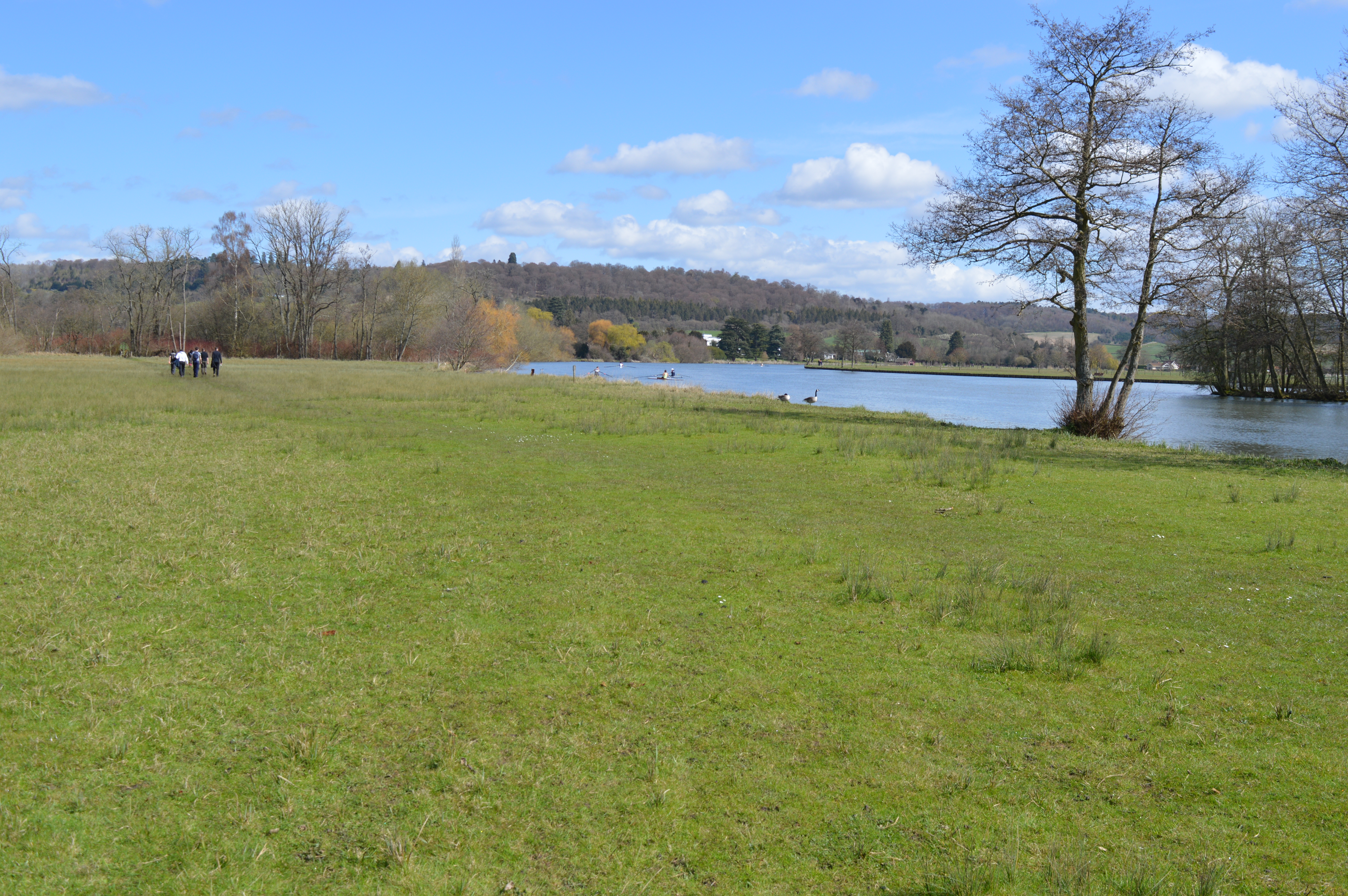
Temple Island Meadows with the River Thames in the background

Buckinghamshire is a county in south-east England, surrounded by Northamptonshire to the north, Bedfordshire and Hertfordshire to the east, Surrey and Berkshire to the south, Greater London to the south-east and Oxfordshire to the west. This ceremonial county has two Unitary Authorities, Buckinghamshire Council and Milton Keynes Council.

In England, Sites of Special Scientific Interest (SSSIs) are designated by Natural England, which is responsible for protecting England's natural environment. Designation as an SSSI gives legal protection to the most important wildlife and geological sites. As of April 2016, there are 65 SSSIs in this Area of Search, 55 of which have been designated for biological interest and 10 for geological interest. Thirty are in the Chilterns Area of Outstanding Natural Beauty, three are in national nature reserves, four are in Special Areas of Conservation, and seventeen are managed by the Berkshire, Buckinghamshire and Oxfordshire Wildlife Trust.

== Sites ==
=== Key ===
- Interest
  - B = site of biological interest
  - G = site of geological interest
- Public access
  - FP = Access only to a footpath across the site
  - No = no public access to site
  - PP = public access to part of site
  - Yes = public access to site
- Other classifications
  - BBOWT = Berkshire, Buckinghamshire and Oxfordshire Wildlife Trust
  - CAONB = Chilterns Area of Outstanding Natural Beauty
  - FC = Forestry Commission
  - GCR = Geological Conservation Review
  - HMWT = Herts and Middlesex Wildlife Trust
  - LNR = Local nature reserve
  - LB = Listed building
- (continued)
  - MKPT = Milton Keynes Parks Trust
  - NCR = A Nature Conservation Review
  - NNR = National nature reserve
  - NT = National Trust
  - SAC = Special Area of Conservation
  - SM = Scheduled monument
  - WT = Woodland Trust

| Site name | Photograph | B | G | Area (Note: The area and grid reference are shown on the Natural England citation for each site.) | Public access | Location | Other classifications | Map (Note: The maps are provided by Natural England on the Magic Map website.) | Citation (Note: Citations are provided for each site by Natural England.) | Description |
|---|---|---|---|---|---|---|---|---|---|---|
| Ashridge Commons and Woods | Pitstone Common | ✓ | | 640.1 hectares (1,582 acres) | YES | Ashridge; 51.8116°N 0.5871°W; SP975135 | CAONB; NT | Map (Note: This site is partly in Hertfordshire.) | Citation | This site is mainly semi-natural vegetation, with has extensive areas of woodland, grass and scrub. There are many species of breeding birds, including some which are rare nationally, such as firecrests. |
| Aston Clinton Ragpits | Aston Clinton Ragpits | ✓ | | 2.9 hectares (7.2 acres) | YES | Aston Clinton; 51.7888°N 0.7140°W; SP888108 | BBOWT; CAONB | Map | Citation | This grassland site has steeply sloping old pits and spoil heaps, with a rich assembly of shrubs, herbs and invertebrates, including twenty-seven butterfly species. There is some mature woodland with beech, yew, ash and whitebeam, together with a hedge and areas of scrub. |
| Aston Rowant | Aston Rowant | ✓ | | 128.5 hectares (318 acres) | YES | Aston Rowant; 51.6689°N 0.9487°W; SU728972 | CAONB NCR; NNR; SAC | Map (Note: This site is partly in Oxfordshire.) | Citation | This site has beech woodland, scrub and chalk grassland. Unusual plants in the ground flora include wood barley, and the orchids Violet and white helleborine. There are several uncommon species of beetles and moths, and fifty breeding bird species. |
| Aston Rowant Woods | Aston Rowant Woods | ✓ | | 209.7 hectares (518 acres) | YES | Aston Rowant; 51.6794°N 0.9167°W; SU750984 | CAONB NCR; NNR; SAC | Map | Citation | The site is described by Natural England as "of national importance as a large, unfragmented area of ancient semi-natural woodland characteristic of the Chilterns scarp". Flora include 52 species indicative of ancient woods, and there are over 100 species of fungi. |
| Bacombe and Coombe Hills | Bacombe Hill | ✓ | | 76.4 hectares (189 acres) | YES | Upper Bacombe; 51.7534°N 0.7671°W; SP852068 | BBOWT; CAONB; LNR; NT | Map | Citation | The site is chalk grassland which has a rich variety of species. including the entire British population of fringed gentian, and there are areas of juniper and mixed scrub. Invertebrates include scarce species, such as chalkhill blue and brown argus butterflies. |
| Bierton Clay Pit | Bierton Clay Pit | | ✓ | 0.1 hectares (0.25 acres) | NO | Bierton; 51.8336°N 0.7838°W; SP839157 | GCR | Map | Citation | This disused clay pit exposes a section from the late Jurassic Kimmeridgian and Tithonian stages, between about 157 and 145 million years ago. It is the only exposure of the northern end of the Portland Beds, and shows the relationship between the Beds and the Hartwell Clay. |
| Black Park | Black Park lake | ✓ | | 15.3 hectares (38 acres) | YES | Wexham; 51.5476°N 0.5405°W; TQ013842 | LNR | Map | Citation | This site has heath, alder carr - both rare in the county - mixed and coniferous woodland and some areas of acid grassland. It has a varied fauna, and insects include the nationally rare Roesel's bush cricket. There are 18 species of butterfly, and birds including hobbies and nightjars. |
| Bolter End Sand Pit | Bolter End Sand Pit | | ✓ | 0.3 hectares (0.74 acres) | NO | Bolter End; 51.6203°N 0.8473°W; SU799919 | GCR | Map | Citation | The site is part of the Reading Beds, and dates to 53 million years ago. It appears to represent riverine layers with sources from much older Lower Cretaceous and Upper Jurassic sequences. |
| Bradenham Woods, Park Wood and The Coppice | Bradenham Woods | ✓ | | 129.1 hectares (319 acres) | YES | Bradenham; 51.6783°N 0.8039°W; SU828984 | CAONB NCR; NT; SAC; SM | Map | Citation | The site is mainly beech woodland, with a rich ground flora including rare species. Twenty-eight species of butterfly have been recorded. There are also areas of chalk grassland. |
| Bugle Quarry | | | ✓ | 0.1 hectares (0.25 acres) | NO | Hartwell; 51.8019°N 0.8514°W; SP793121 | GCR | Map | Citation | The site spans the late Jurassic, and the early Cretaceous, 152 to 139 million years ago. Dinosaur teeth include those of Pelorosaurus, which are the only sauropod teeth of Tithonian (late Jurassic) age in Europe. |
| Burnham Beeches | Burnham Beeches | ✓ | | 374.6 hectares (926 acres) | PP | Farnham Common; 51.5622°N 0.6309°W; SU950857 | NNR; SAC; SM | Map | Citation | This site has diverse habitats, ancient oak and beech pollards, wet heath and bog, alder wood, ponds and a stream. There are dormice, 56 bird species and some very rare beetles. |
| Buttlers Hangings | Buttlers Hangings | ✓ | | 3.9 hectares (9.6 acres) | YES | Bradenham; 51.6587°N 0.8203°W; SU817962 | CAONB | Map | Citation | The site is steeply sloping grassland and scrub which has a wide variety of plant species. There are many rabbit burrows and a badger sett. Invertebrates include colonies of chalkland butterflies and four endangered Red Book spiders. |
| Dancersend | Dancersend | ✓ | | 81.3 hectares (201 acres) | YES | Wendover; 51.7760°N 0.6969°W; SP900094 | BBOWT; CAONB; FC | Map | Citation | This reserve has woodland plantations, unimproved chalk grassland and scrub. The woods have few mature trees as most were felled during the 1940s, but a rich ground flora includes plants associated with ancient woodland, such as hairy brome and wood melick. |
| Dancersend Waterworks | Dancersend Waterworks | ✓ | | 4.0 hectares (9.9 acres) | NO | Hastoe; 51.7724°N 0.6883°W; SP906090 | CAONB; LB | Map | Citation | The site is an area of artificial banks, basins and plateaux in a chalk valley bottom, which has an unusually wide variety of herbs, grasses and shrubs. There is a badger sett and a range of butterfly and bird species. |
| Ellesborough and Kimble Warrens | Great Kimble Warren | ✓ | | 68.9 hectares (170 acres) | YES | Ellesborough; 51.7447°N 0.7978°W; SP831058 | CAONB; SM | Map | Citation | This is one of the most important sites in the Chilterns for natural box woodlands, and it also has grasslands with rare plant species. There is a wide range of invertebrates and breeding birds. |
| Fayland Chalk Bank | Fayland Chalk Bank | ✓ | | 0.6 hectares (1.5 acres) | NO | Parmoor; 51.5917°N 0.8653°W; SU787887 | CAONB | Map | Citation | The site is chalk grassland which has a diverse flora. Orchids include the common spotted and pyramidal, and the profusion of chalk flowers and its south facing location make the site important for bees, grasshoppers and butterflies. |
| Fern House Gravel Pit | Fern House Gravel Pit | | ✓ | 1.3 hectares (3.2 acres) | NO | Bourne End; 51.5884°N 0.7268°W; SU883885 | GCR | Map | Citation | This site may help to elucidate the history of the River Thames between glacial Anglian stage, around 450,000 years ago, when the river was diverted south to its present course, and the warm Ipswichian around 120,000 years ago. Fossils include straight-tusked elephants and mammoths. |
| Finemere Wood | Finemere Wood | ✓ | | 45.7 hectares (113 acres) | YES | Quainton; 51.8901°N 0.9581°W; SP718218 | BBOWT | Map | Citation | Most of the site is ancient pedunculate oak forest, which has butterflies including the rare wood white and black hairstreak. There is also an area of rough grassland and scrub which is crossed by the River Ray. |
| Foxcote Reservoir and Wood | Foxcote Reservoir | ✓ | | 48.3 hectares (119 acres) | | Akeley; 52.0215°N 0.9653°W; SP711364 | BBOWT | Map | Citation | The reservoir is important for wintering wildfowl, especially shoveler ducks and Bewick's swans. The area around the reservoir has woodland, meadows and ponds. Plants include the greater butterfly orchid and the herb Paris quadrifolia. |
| Frieth Meadows | Frieth Meadows | ✓ | | 2.5 hectares (6.2 acres) | NO | Frieth; 51.6077°N 0.8476°W; SU799905 | | Map | Citation | The site consists of traditionally managed and unimproved meadows on neutral to acid soils. Plants include quaking grass, green-winged orchid, lousewort and devil's bit scabious. Grassland and hedgerows have a wide range of invertebrates. |
| Froghall Brickworks | Froghall Brickworks | | ✓ | 0.7 hectares (1.7 acres) | NO | Chalfont St Giles; 51.6372°N 0.5896°W; SU977941 | | Map | Citation | The site is Pleistocene gravel above Reading beds. The gravel was deposited by the proto-River Thames, before it was diverted south by the Anglian Ice Age around 450,000 years ago. |
| Frogmore Meadows | Frogmore Meadows | ✓ | | 4.6 hectares (11 acres) | YES | Chenies; 51.6796°N 0.5247°W; TQ021989 | CAONB | Map | Citation | The site has marshy areas and fens next to the river, damp grassland and drier, more acidic areas. The river bank has water voles, and damp areas are dominated by meadow foxtail and Yorkshire fog, with some marsh marigold and marsh bedstraw. |
| Gomm Valley | Little Gomm's Wood | ✓ | | 4.1 hectares (10 acres) | YES | Micklefield; 51.6215°N 0.7057°W; SU897922 | BBOWT; CAONB | Map | Citation | The site is chalk grassland which is reverting to scrub. It has a rich variety of herbs and of invertebrates, and is notable for reptiles and overwintering birds, particularly thrushes. Over 30 species of butterflies and 180 of moths have been recorded. |
| Grangelands and Pulpit Hill | Grangelands and Pulpit Hill | ✓ | | 25.5 hectares (63 acres) | YES | Cadsden; 51.7376°N 0.8009°W; SP829050 | BBOWT; CAONB; NT | Map | Citation | The site has grassland and scrub, which support interesting breeding birds and invertebrates, such as glow-worms and marbled white and chalk hill blue butterflies. There are areas of mature beech woodland, with a sparse shrub layer of holly and elder. |
| Grendon and Doddershall Woods | Grendon Wood | ✓ | | 67.1 hectares (166 acres) | YES | Grendon Underwood; 51.8814°N 0.9859°W; SP699208 | | Map | Citation | The site is broadleaved oak woodland on north Buckinghamshire clay, with an understorey of hazel and blackthorn. Herbs include primrose and wood anemone, and small streams and wide rides provide additional habitats. The woods have 35 butterfly species, including the rare black hairstreak. |
| Ham Home-cum-Hamgreen Woods | Ham Home Wood | ✓ | | 23.2 hectares (57 acres) | YES | Grendon Underwood; 51.8653°N 0.9921°W; SP695190 | | Map | Citation | The site is ancient woodland on clay, with a varied structure, and a rich variety of flora and invertebrates. The site has the largest British breeding colony of the nationally rare black hairstreak butterfly. |
| Hodgemoor Wood | Bluebells in Hodgemoor Wood | ✓ | | 102.6 hectares (254 acres) | YES | Chalfont St Giles; 51.6320°N 0.6028°W; SU968935 | CAONB; FC | Map | Citation | The site is a large area of semi-natural broad-leaved woodland on unusually varied soil types of mottled clays, sands and gravels, and trees include ancient coppiced oak, beech and hornbeam. Butterflies include white admirals, and the nationally rare jewel beetle Agrilus pannonicus has been recorded. |
| Hollowhill and Pullingshill Woods | Hollowhill and Pullingshill Woods | ✓ | | 23.0 hectares (57 acres) | YES | Marlow; 51.5687°N 0.8154°W; SU822862 | BBOWT; CAONB; WT | Map | Citation | A large part of the site is mature beech woodland, the result of neglected coppicing. Much of the ground below the trees is bare, but there are some unusual plants, including the nationally rare ghost orchid. There is heather in more open areas. |
| Homefield Wood | Homefield Wood | ✓ | | 6.1 hectares (15 acres) | YES | Hambleden; 51.5733°N 0.8283°W; SU813867 | BBOWT; CAONB; FC | Map | Citation | The site has young beech plantations, with some conifers and many native trees. There are rides and glades with varied herb-rich chalk grassland, and a variety of orchids. The rich invertebrate fauna includes thirty species of butterfly and over four hundred of moth. |
| Howe Park Wood | Howe Park Wood | ✓ | | 21.4 hectares (53 acres) | YES | Tattenhoe; 52.0018°N 0.7880°W; SP833344 | MKPT | Map | Citation | The site is ancient semi-natural woodland on poorly drained clay, causing seasonal waterlogging, with some areas which are drier. There is a wide variety of trees and shrubs, and almost three hundred species of moths have been recorded. Butterflies include the nationally rare black hairstreak. |
| Ivinghoe Hills | Ivinghoe Beacon | ✓ | | 212.3 hectares (525 acres) | YES | Ivinghoe; 51.8334°N 0.6038°W; SP963159 | CAONB NCR; NT; SM | Map | Citation | The site is biologically rich, and it has varied habitats including unimproved chalk grassland, which has some nationally rare species, semi-natural woodland and scrub. There are two areas of ancient woodland. |
| Kingcup Meadows and Oldhouse Wood | Kingcup Meadows | ✓ | | 13.2 hectares (33 acres) | YES | Denham; 51.5554°N 0.5157°W; TQ030851 | | Map | Citation | This is a mosaic of different habitats next to the River Alder Bourne, including unimproved pasture and woodland. The meadows have dry and wet grassland, swamp and fen. Oldhouse Wood has ash and field maple on upper slopes and oak and birch on lower ones. |
| Kings and Bakers Woods and Heaths | Rammamere Heath | ✓ | | 212.8 hectares (526 acres) | YES | Great Brickhill; 51.9563°N 0.6553°W | NCR; NNR; WTBCN | Map (Note: This site is partly in Bedfordshire.) | Citation | The site has the largest remaining area of woodland in Bedfordshire, together with lowland heath, acidic grassland and some small ponds. There are a number of rare plant species, including great woodrush, wood vetch and saw-wort. There are also abundant birds and insects, including white admiral butterflies and tree pipits. |
| Littleworth Common | Littleworth Common | ✓ | | 15.8 hectares (39 acres) | YES | Farnham Common; 51.5669°N 0.6524°W; SU935862 | | Map | Citation | The site was formerly open heathland, most of which has developed into birch and oak woodland. Some remnants of acid heathland survive, and marshy areas and two large ponds have uncommon communities, including the nationally rare starfruit. |
| Lodge Hill | Lodge Hill | ✓ | | 31.8 hectares (79 acres) | YES | Bledlow Ridge; 51.6940°N 0.8526°W; SP794001 | CAONB; SM | Map | Citation | The site is chalk grassland and scrub which is notable for its invertebrates, including butterflies. It has a rare snail, Abide secale, and populations of badgers and slowworms. There is also a Bronze Age Bowl barrow. |
| Long Herdon Meadow | Long Herdon Meadow | ✓ | | 4.5 hectares (11 acres) | YES | Marsh Gibbon; 51.8766°N 1.0601°W; SP648202 | BBOWT | Map | Citation | The site is an alluvial meadow next to the River Ray in the Vale of Aylesbury. It has clay soil and is liable to flooding. A regime of a hay cut followed by cattle grazing, without the use of artificial fertilisers, has resulted in a diverse grassland habitat now rare in England. |
| Mid Colne Valley | Ranston Covert | ✓ | | 132.0 hectares (326 acres) | YES | Denham; 51.5956°N 0.4956°W; TQ043896 | | Map (Note: This site is partly in Greater London.) | Citation | The valley has over 70 woodland and wetland breeding bird species, and 80 wintering wildfowl. It also has one of the few surviving areas of unimproved chalk grassland in Greater London, and woodland of pedunculate oak and ash. |
| Millfield Wood | Millfield Wood | ✓ | | 9.5 hectares (23 acres) | YES | High Wycombe; 51.6507°N 0.7439°W; SU870954 | BBOWT; CAONB | Map | Citation | this is semi-natural beech woodland on chalk, which is an unusual habitat, and it also has considerable wych elm. Its rich ground flora includes some ancient woodland and nationally restricted species, and many wild flowers, which is unusual in beech woodland. |
| Moorend Common | Moorend Common | ✓ | | 28.0 hectares (69 acres) | YES | Lane End; 51.6076°N 0.8433°W; SU802905 | CAONB | Map | Citation | The site is on London Clay, which is unusual for the Chilterns, and the soil is acid and sometimes waterlogged. Habitats are grassland, heath, woodland, marsh and scrub. Marshy areas have heath spotted orchid and bog mosses. |
| Muswell Hill | Muswell Hill | | ✓ | 0.3 hectares (0.74 acres) | YES | Brill; 51.8327°N 1.0726°W; SP640153 | GCR | Map | Citation | This site has sandstones and sandy ironstones. It is problematic as their precise age and the circumstances of deposition are uncertain, but they are thought to be early Cretaceous, with late Jurassic underlying layers. |
| Naphill Common | Naphill Common | ✓ | | 71.7 hectares (177 acres) | YES | Naphill; 51.6673°N 0.7868°W; SU840972 | CAONB NCR | Map | Citation | This oak and beech wood has diverse trees and shrubs, areas of acid heath, wet rides and ponds. Many of the oaks and beech trees are ancient pollards. Heathland clearings have some species which are uncommon in the county, such as heath bedstraw and the heather Calluna vulgaris. |
| Old Rectory Meadows | Old Rectory Meadows | ✓ | | 7.9 hectares (20 acres) | NO | Denham; 51.5760°N 0.5107°W; TQ033874 | | Map | Citation | This site on the bank of the River Misbourne has wet alluvial and water meadows, marsh and alder carr woodland. It has plants which are rare in the county such as marsh arrowgrass, and its irregular structure provides a suitable habitat for insects. |
| Oxley Mead | Oxley Mead | ✓ | | 3.7 hectares (9.1 acres) | YES | Milton Keynes; 52.0056°N 0.8083°W; SP819348 | MKPT | Map | Citation | The site is an ancient hay meadow which has a nationally rare plant community, due to its traditional management. The main plants are herbs such as great burnet and meadow sweet, and grasses include meadow foxtail and sweet vernal-grass. |
| Pilch Fields | Pilch Fields | ✓ | | 11.1 hectares (27 acres) | YES | Great Horwood; 51.9832°N 0.9137°W; SP747322 | BBOWT | Map | Citation | The site has two fields called Big Pilch and Little Pilch. The varied habitats in Big Pilch include wetland, fen, scrub, a stream and ridge-and-furrow grassland. The stream continues into Little Pilch, which has spring-fed fen and grassland. Over two hundred flowering plants have been recorded. |
| Pitstone Hill | Pitstone Hill | ✓ | | 22.9 hectares (57 acres) | YES | Ivinghoe; 51.8211°N 0.6231°W; SP950145 | CAONB | Map | Citation | The site is chalk grassland on a steeply sloping hill, with small areas of woodland and scrub. Flowers include the nationally scarce pasque flower and field fleawort. Twenty-six species of butterfly have been recorded, and breeding birds include skylarks, meadow pipits and willow warblers. |
| Pitstone Quarry | Pitstone Quarry | | ✓ | 10.3 hectares (25 acres) | PP | Ivinghoe; 51.8204°N 0.6478°W; SP933144 | | Map | Citation | The site exposes deposits of the Middle and Late Pleistocene, during the last half-million years. Most sediments date to ice ages, but those from the latest warm period, the Ipswichian around 125,000 years ago, contains hippopotamus fossils. |
| Poker's Pond Meadow | Poker's Pond Meadow | ✓ | | 1.9 hectares (4.7 acres) | NO | Soulbury; 51.9436°N 0.7226°W; SP879280 | | Map | Citation | The site is ancient hay meadow which has been traditionally managed, and has the remains of medieval ridge and furrow ploughing. There is a marshy area, but most of the field is dry grassland, with an unusually wide variety of plants, and over 100 species of grasses, sedges, herbs and rushes have been recorded. |
| Rodbed Wood | Rodbed Wood | ✓ | | 2.2 hectares (5.4 acres) | FP | Medmenham; 51.5456°N 0.8420°W; SU804836 | CAONB | Map | Citation | The site is wet willow and alder woodland close to the River Thames, fed by a ditch from neighbouring water meadows. The understorey has blackthorn, hawthorn and guelder rose. There is a diverse flora, including the nationally rare summer snowflake. There is a rich invertebrate fauna. |
| Rushbeds Wood and Railway Cutting | Rushbeds Wood | ✓ | | 80.2 hectares (198 acres) | PP | Wotton Underwood; 51.8341°N 1.0334°W; SP667155 | BBOWT | Map | Citation | The site is ancient woodland on heavy clay soils which are often waterlogged. The invertebrate fauna are described by Natural England as "exceptional", including over thirty butterfly species, such as the nationally rare black hairstreak and the scarce wood white and purple emperor. |
| Shabbington Woods Complex | Bernwood Forest | ✓ | | 305.6 hectares (755 acres) | YES | Long Crendon; 51.7943°N 1.1097°W; SP615110 | BBOWT; FC | Map | Citation | The site is the largest remnant of the former Royal Forest of Bernwood. There is a small area of ancient woodland and two unimproved meadows, bounded by mature hedges, and several ponds. The main ecological interest is the rich insect fauna, and over forty species of butterfly have been recorded, including the rare Duke of Burgundy. |
| Sheephouse Wood | Sheephouse Wood | ✓ | | 56.9 hectares (141 acres) | PP | Charndon; 51.9056°N 0.9795°W; SP703235 | | Map | Citation | The site has ancient pedunculate oak woodland with many small streams and diverse ground flora, typical breeding birds and some uncommon invertebrates. Invertebrates include the rare black hairstreak butterfly and ground-hopper tetrix subulata. |
| South Lodge Pit | South Lodge Pit | | ✓ | 0.5 hectares (1.2 acres) | NO | Taplow; 51.5290°N 0.6962°W; SU905819 | GCR | Map | Citation | This former chalk quarry dates to the late Cretaceous, around 83 million year ago, when sea levels were much higher, and marine fossils are found in several horizons, including annelids, oysters and bivalves. It is the only British example of a chalk phosphorite deposit, comparable to deposits in the Paris Basin. |
| Stoke Common | Stoke Common heathland | ✓ | | 83.2 hectares (206 acres) | YES | Stoke Poges; 51.5580°N 0.5806°W; SU985853 | | Map | Citation | The site is a last remnant of a large heath, and is on glacial gravel over London clay, with some parts permanently waterlogged. There is a rich invertebrate fauna, especially moths, and the dusky cockroach and rare bog bush cricket have also been recorded. |
| Stone | Stone SSSI | | ✓ | 0.1 hectares (0.25 acres) | NO | Stone; 51.8066°N 0.8730°W; SP778126 | GCR | Map | Citation | This site has undated sands of Lower Cretaceous Wealden deposits. The sand is of northern origin, and includes Carboniferous chert. The site is described by Natural England as important for its bearing on the palaeogeography of the Wealden. |
| Swain's Wood | Swain's Wood | ✓ | | 16.2 hectares (40 acres) | NO | Turville; 51.6220°N 0.9339°W; SU739920 | BBOWT; CAONB; CAONB | Map | Citation | The site is in the upper slopes of a valley, with grassland and scrub, flanked by woodland on both sides. The grassland has varied plant and invertebrate species, and around 117 species of spider and over 160 of butterflies and moths have been recorded. |
| Temple Island Meadows | Temple Island Meadows | ✓ | | 14.1 hectares (35 acres) | YES | Henley-on-Thames; 51.5560°N 0.8922°W; SU769847 | | Map | Citation | The site is composed of several wet meadows which are grazed by sheep. They are seasonally flooded and waterlogged, and have a diverse flora and fauna. Plants include the nationally rare summer snowflake, and marsh and early marsh orchids. |
| Tingewick Meadows | Tingewick Meadows | ✓ | | 11.1 hectares (27 acres) | YES | Tingewick; 51.9763°N 1.0522°W; SP652313 | | Map | Citation | The meadows have areas of ancient ridge and furrow, and of marsh and ditches which are fed by springs. The grassland has a rich variety of plant species, some of which are rare in the Vale of Aylesbury, such as the quaking grass briza media and the dwarf thistle cirsium acaule. |
| Tring Reservoirs | Tring Reservoirs | ✓ | | 106.5 hectares (263 acres) | YES | Tring; 51.8135°N 0.6683°W; SP919136 | HMWT | Map | Citation | These four reservoirs are important for birds, including nationally important numbers of wintering shovellers, and a diverse breeding community. It is also important for invertebrates such as dragonflies. |
| Turville Hill | Turville Hill | ✓ | | 22.4 hectares (55 acres) | YES | High Wycombe; 51.6153°N 0.8907°W; SU769913 | CAONB | Map | Citation | This is steeply sloping grazed chalk grassland with a wide variety of plants. Two butterflies are rare, the silver spotted skipper and the Adonis blue. Another scarce invertebrate is the orange clearwing moth. |
| Warren Farm, Stewkley | Warren Farm, Stewkley | | ✓ | 1.5 hectares (3.7 acres) | NO | Stewkley; 51.9098°N 0.7643°W; SP851242 | GCR | Map | Citation | This site is the most northern exposure of the Jurassic Portlandian basin, and is important for palaeographic reconstruction. It is described by Natural England as "vital to our understanding of the late Jurassic environments, stratigraphy and palaeogeography. |
| Weston Turville Reservoir | Weston Turville Reservoir | ✓ | | 18.4 hectares (45 acres) | YES | Weston Turville; 51.7784°N 0.7519°W; SP862096 | BBOWT; CAONB | Map | Citation | The open water is important for 46 species of overwintering waterfowl, and the site is nationally important for shovelers. The areas around the reservoir have tall fen, reed beds and willow carr, declining habitats in Britain. There are over 300 species of beetle, of which six are rare nationally. |
| Widdenton Park Wood | Widdenton Park Wood | ✓ | | 23.5 hectares (58 acres) | YES | High Wycombe; 51.6164°N 0.8214°W; SU817915 | CAONB | Map | Citation | This is ancient semi-natural oak-beech woodland, which supports a varied flora including several uncommon species. The most important feature is a number of extensive spring-fed mires, dominated by willow and birch. |
| Windsor Hill | Windsor Hill | ✓ | | 61.8 hectares (153 acres) | PP | Princes Risborough; 51.6273°N 0.9222°W; SU747926 | BBOWT; CAONB NCR | Map | Citation | This site has beech woodland, scrub and chalk grassland. The scrub has an ancient hedge and a colony of juniper, and 23 species of butterfly have been recorded, including brown hairstreaks. |
| Wormsley Chalk Banks | Wormsley Chalk Banks | ✓ | | 14.1 hectares (35 acres) | PP | Turville; 51.6372°N 0.9249°W; SU745937 | CAONB | Map | Citation | The site has chalk grassland which is rich in both plant and invertebrate species which have sharply declined nationally. Flowers include bee and fly orchids, the latter of which is becoming scarce. Invertebrates include a variety of butterflies, harvest spiders and slowworms. |
| Yardley Chase | Yardley Chase | ✓ | | 353.1 hectares (873 acres) | PP | Olney; 52.1759°N 0.7540°W; SP853538 | | Map (Note: This site is partly in Northamptonshire.) | Citation | This Chase has diverse semi-natural habitats, and its value for invertebrates has been enhanced by military use of the site, which has resulted in a long absence of intensive agriculture. There is woodland and unimproved grassland, and 30 breeding butterfly species have been recorded. |

== See also ==
- List of Local Nature Reserves in Buckinghamshire
