= Warren Farm =

Warren Farm may refer to:

- Warren Farm, Southall, London, UK
- Warren Farm, Stewkley, Buckinghamshire, UK
