= Sheephouse Wood Bat Protection Structure =

Railroad component in Britain

The Sheephouse Wood Bat Protection Structure is an under-construction building to allow bats to cross the HS2 rail line at Sheephouse Wood in Buckinghamshire, England.

The structure will be around 1 km in length and up to 10 m high.

The shed will cost over £100 million to build. According to the Chair of HS2, there is no evidence "that high-speed trains interfere with bats."
