= Bugle Quarry =

Geological site in England

Coordinates: 51.802373°N 0.850626°W

- Site of Special Scientific Interest
- Location of Bugle Quarry.
- Area of search: Buckinghamshire
- Grid reference: SP793121
- Interest: Geological
- Area: 0.08 ha (0.20 acres)
- Notification date: 1986
- Location map: Magic Map

Bugle Quarry is a 0.08-hectare (0.20-acre) geological Site of Special Scientific Interest in Hartwell in Buckinghamshire, England. The local planning authority is Aylesbury Vale District Council. It has two entries in the Geological Conservation Review of the Joint Nature Conservation Committee.

The site has been studied by geologists for over 150 years. In 1958 it was filled by the spoil from road improvements, but in the following year a section was re-exposed by geologists from Queen Mary College, London. It was again re-opened in 1984, but it is in an unsafe state and is protected by a fence.

The site spans the Tithonian stage (c. 152-145 million years ago) in the late Jurassic, and the Berriasian (c. 145-139 million years ago) in the early Cretaceous. It was formerly the type section for the Portland (Tithonian) and Purbeck (Berriasian) Groups in the Aylesbury area; it has yielded an important sequence of ostracod fauna which spans the junction between the two stages, and the environmental change from land to sea. A number of dinosaur teeth have been found, including Pelorosaurus teeth which are the only sauropod teeth of Tithonian age in Europe. Teeth found of the carnosaur Megalosaurus are the only ones found of the same period in Britain.

The site is in the grounds of Hartwell Riding Stables with no public access.
