= Ashridge Commons and Woods =

UK Site of Special Scientific Interest

Coordinates: 51.81164°N 0.5871°W

- Site of Special Scientific Interest
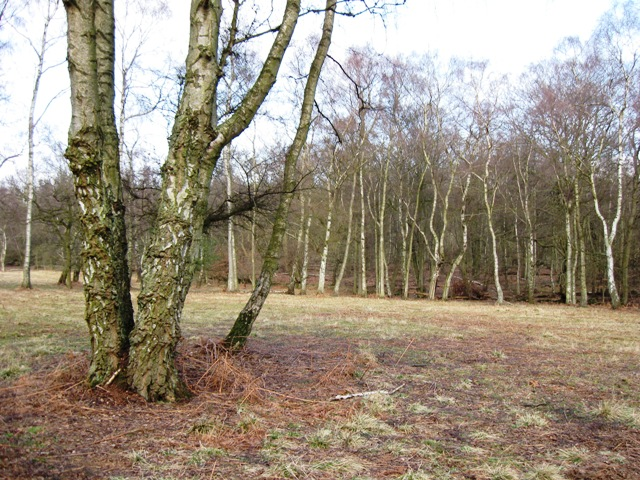
- Location of Ashridge Commons and Woods.
- Area of search: Hertfordshire; Buckinghamshire
- Grid reference: SP975135
- Interest: Biological
- Area: 640.1 ha (1,582 acres)
- Notification date: 1987
- Location map: Magic Map

Ashridge Commons and Woods is a 640.1 hectare biological Site of Special Scientific Interest in Buckinghamshire and Hertfordshire. It is located in Little Gaddesden, and is part of the National Trust Ashridge Estate in the Chilterns Area of Outstanding Natural Beauty.

This site is mainly semi-natural vegetation, with has extensive areas of woodland, grass and scrub. There are many species of breeding birds, including some which are rare nationally, such as firecrests. Other species which are locally rare are common redstart, nightingale and wood warbler. There are a number of small ponds which support populations of amphibians and invertebrates.

The entrance to the Ashridge Estate is in Moneybury Hill, Ringshall.

== See also ==
- List of Sites of Special Scientific Interest in Buckinghamshire
- List of Sites of Special Scientific Interest in Hertfordshire
