= Bierton Clay Pit =

Coordinates: 51.8341°N 0.7831°W

- Site of Special Scientific Interest
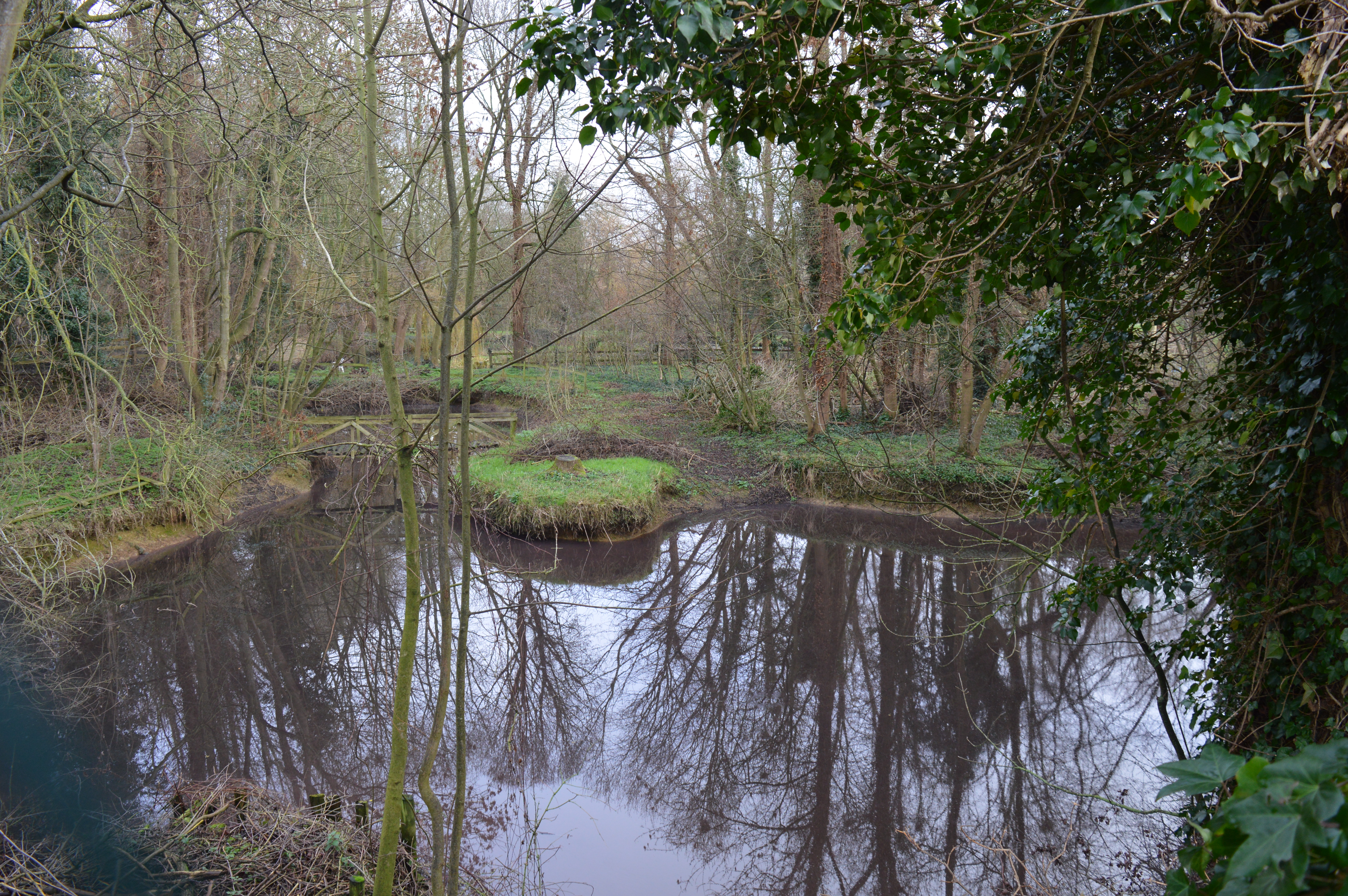
- Location of Bierton Clay Pit.
- Area of search: Buckinghamshire
- Grid reference: SP839157
- Interest: Geological
- Area: 0.1 ha (0.25 acres)
- Notification date: 1986
- Location map: Magic Map

Bierton Clay Pit is a 0.07-hectare (0.17-acre) geological Site of Special Scientific Interest in Bierton in Buckinghamshire. It is listed by the Joint Nature Conservation Committee as a Geological Conservation Review site.

This disused clay pit exposes a section from the late Jurassic Kimmeridgian and Tithonian stages, between about 157 and 145 million years ago. It is the only exposure of the northern end of the Portland Beds, and shows the relationship between the Beds and the Hartwell Clay. It also gives evidence of a period of erosion followed by a rise in sea level.

The pit is now flooded and no geology is visible. It can be viewed from a footpath between Barnett Way and Brick Kiln Lane.
