= Portland Sand Formation =

Geological formation in Dorset, England

- Stratigraphic range: Tithonian, 152 Ma
- Type: Group
- Unit of: Portland Group
- Underlies: Portland Stone Formation
- Overlies: Kimmeridge Clay Formation
- Thickness: up to 40 metres (130 ft)

Lithology
- Primary: Dolomite
- Other: Siltstone, limestone and sandstone

Location
- Region: England
- Country: UK
- Extent: Dorset

Type section
- Named for: Isle of Portland
- Location: Clay Ope, West Weare Cliff, Isle of Portland
- Thickness at type section: 30 m

The Portland Sand Formation is a limestone formation from the Tithonian stage of the Jurassic period on the Isle of Portland, Dorset, England. The formation is made up largely of dolomites but includes siltstones and fine-grained sandstones in its lower parts. It is a sub unit of the Portland Group.
