= Bradenham Woods, Park Wood and The Coppice =

Protected area in Buckinghamshire, England

Coordinates: 51.6783°N 0.8039°W

- Site of Special Scientific Interest
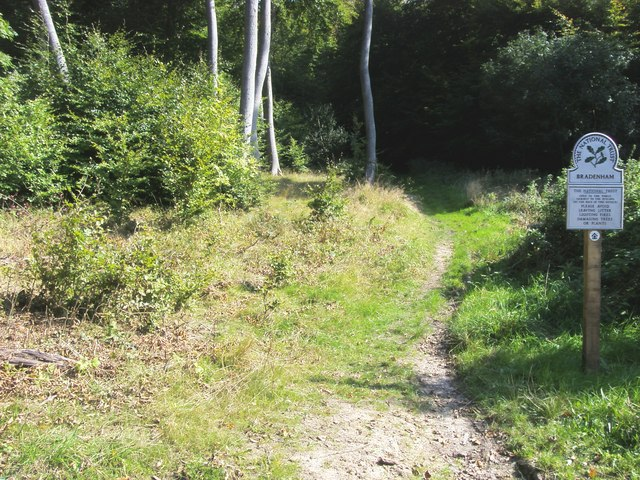
- Location of Bradenham Woods, Park Wood and The Coppice.
- Area of search: Buckinghamshire
- Grid reference: SU828984
- Interest: Biological
- Area: 129.1 ha (319 acres)
- Notification date: 1984
- Location map: Magic Map

Bradenham Woods, Park Wood and The Coppice is a 129.1-hectare (319-acre) biological Site of Special Scientific Interest in Bradenham in Buckinghamshire. It is in the Chilterns Area of Outstanding Natural Beauty, and it is described in A Nature Conservation Review. The site is part of the Bradenham Estate, which is owned by the National Trust. It is also designated a Special Area of Conservation. Grim's Ditch, a Scheduled Monument, runs through the site.

The site is mainly beech woodland, with a rich ground flora including rare species. Twenty-eight species of butterfly have been recorded. There are also areas of chalk grassland.

There is permanent access to the site.

== See also ==
- List of Sites of Special Scientific Interest in Buckinghamshire

Molly Drake made a song about having breakfast here, titled "Breakfast At Bradenham Woods".
