= Finemere Wood =

Wood in Buckinghamshire, England

Coordinates: 51.8901°N 0.9581°W

- Site of Special Scientific Interest
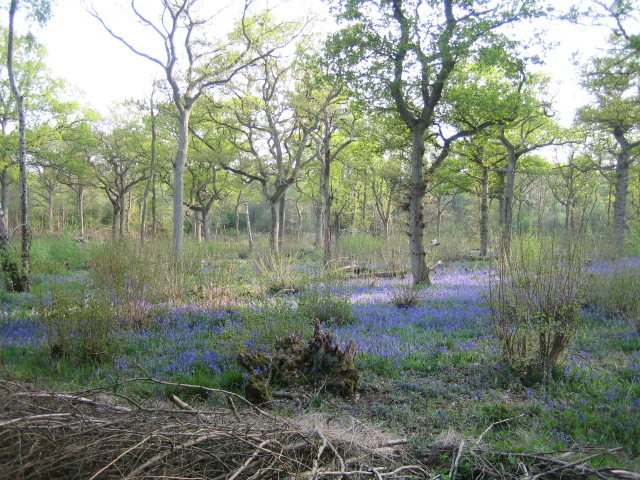
- Bluebells in Finemere Wood
- Location of Finemere Wood.
- Area of search: Buckinghamshire
- Grid reference: SP718218
- Interest: Biological
- Area: 45.7 ha (113 acres)
- Notification date: 1990
- Location map: Magic Map

Finemere Wood is a 45.7-hectare (113-acre) biological Site of Special Scientific Interest near Quainton in Buckinghamshire. It is managed by the Berkshire, Buckinghamshire and Oxfordshire Wildlife Trust and the planning authority is Buckinghamshire Council.

The wood was formerly part of Bernwood Forest, a medieval royal hunting forest. Most of the site is ancient pedunculate oak forest, which has butterflies including the rare wood white and black hairstreak. There is also an area of rough grassland and scrub which is crossed by the River Ray.

The site is open at all times and there is access from the road between Quainton and Edgcott.

== See also ==
- List of Sites of Special Scientific Interest in Buckinghamshire
