= Stoke Common =

Nature reserve in Buckinghamshire, England

Coordinates: 51.833099°N 1.071889°W

- Site of Special Scientific Interest
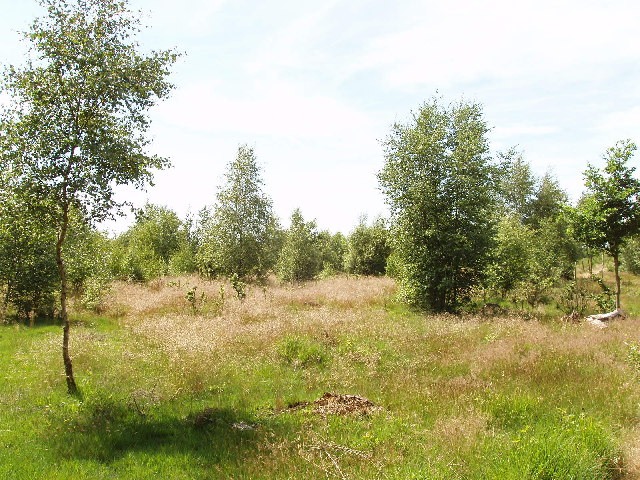
- Location of Stoke Common.
- Area of search: Buckinghamshire
- Grid reference: SU985853
- Interest: Biological
- Area: 83.1 ha (205 acres)
- Notification date: 1984
- Location map: Magic Map

Stoke Common is an 83.1-hectare (205-acre) Site of Special Scientific Interest in Stoke Poges in Buckinghamshire. It is registered common land, and it is owned by a charitable trust, with the City of London Corporation as the main funder and trustee.

The site is a last remnant of a large heath, and is on glacial gravel over London clay, with some parts permanently waterlogged. Periodic burning helps to manage the land. There are small areas of birch, pine and mixed woodland, with several ponds. There is a rich invertebrate fauna, especially moths, and the dusky cockroach and rare bog bush cricket have also been recorded.

There is access from Stoke Common Road, Gerrards Cross Road and Windmill Road.
