= Ellesborough and Kimble Warrens =

Protected area in Buckinghamshire, England

Coordinates: 51.7447°N 0.7978°W

- Site of Special Scientific Interest
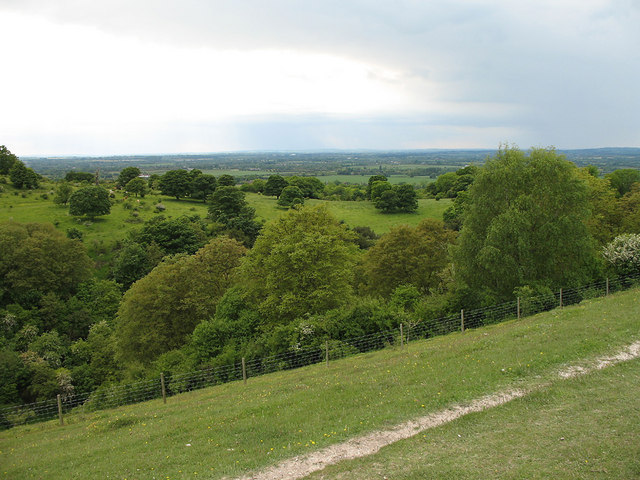
- View across Great Kimble Warren
- Location of Ellesborough and Kimble Warrens.
- Area of search: Buckinghamshire
- Grid reference: SP831058
- Interest: Biological
- Area: 68.9 ha (170 acres)
- Notification date: 1984
- Location map: Magic Map

Ellesborough and Kimble Warrens is a 68.9-hectare (170-acre) biological Site of Special Scientific Interest in Ellesborough in Buckinghamshire. The local planning authority is Wycombe District Council. It is part of the Chilterns Area of Outstanding Natural Beauty.

The site contains three deep valleys, called Ellesborough Warren and Great and Little Kimble Warrens. It is one of the most important sites in the Chilterns for natural box woodlands, and it also has grasslands with rare plant species. There is a wide range of invertebrates and breeding birds.

A warren is an area set aside in medieval times for the breeding of rabbits or hares. On Beacon Hill, in the north-east of the site, there is a well-preserved pillow mound, a purpose-built breeding place, and this is a scheduled monument.

== See also ==
- List of Sites of Special Scientific Interest in Buckinghamshire
