= Gomm Valley =

Protected area in Buckinghamshire, England

Coordinates: 51.6215°N 0.7057°W

- Site of Special Scientific Interest
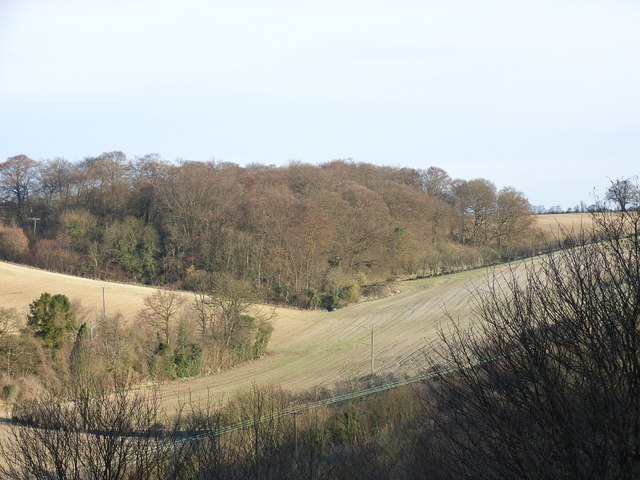
- View of Little Gomm's Wood from Gomm Valley
- Location of Gomm Valley.
- Area of search: Buckinghamshire
- Grid reference: SU897922
- Interest: Biological
- Area: 4.1 ha (10 acres)
- Location map: Magic Map

Gomm Valley is a 4-hectare (9.9-acre) biological Site of Special Scientific Interest in Micklefield, a district of High Wycombe in Buckinghamshire. It is managed by the Berkshire, Buckinghamshire and Oxfordshire Wildlife Trust and is part of the Chilterns Area of Outstanding Natural Beauty. The local planning authority is Wycombe District Council.

The site is chalk grassland which is reverting to scrub. It has a rich variety of herbs and of invertebrates, and is notable for reptiles and overwintering birds, particularly thrushes. Over 30 species of butterflies and 180 of moths have been recorded.

== See also ==
- List of Sites of Special Scientific Interest in Buckinghamshire
