= Wormsley Chalk Banks =

Protected areas in England

Coordinates: 51.638°N 0.924°W

- Site of Special Scientific Interest
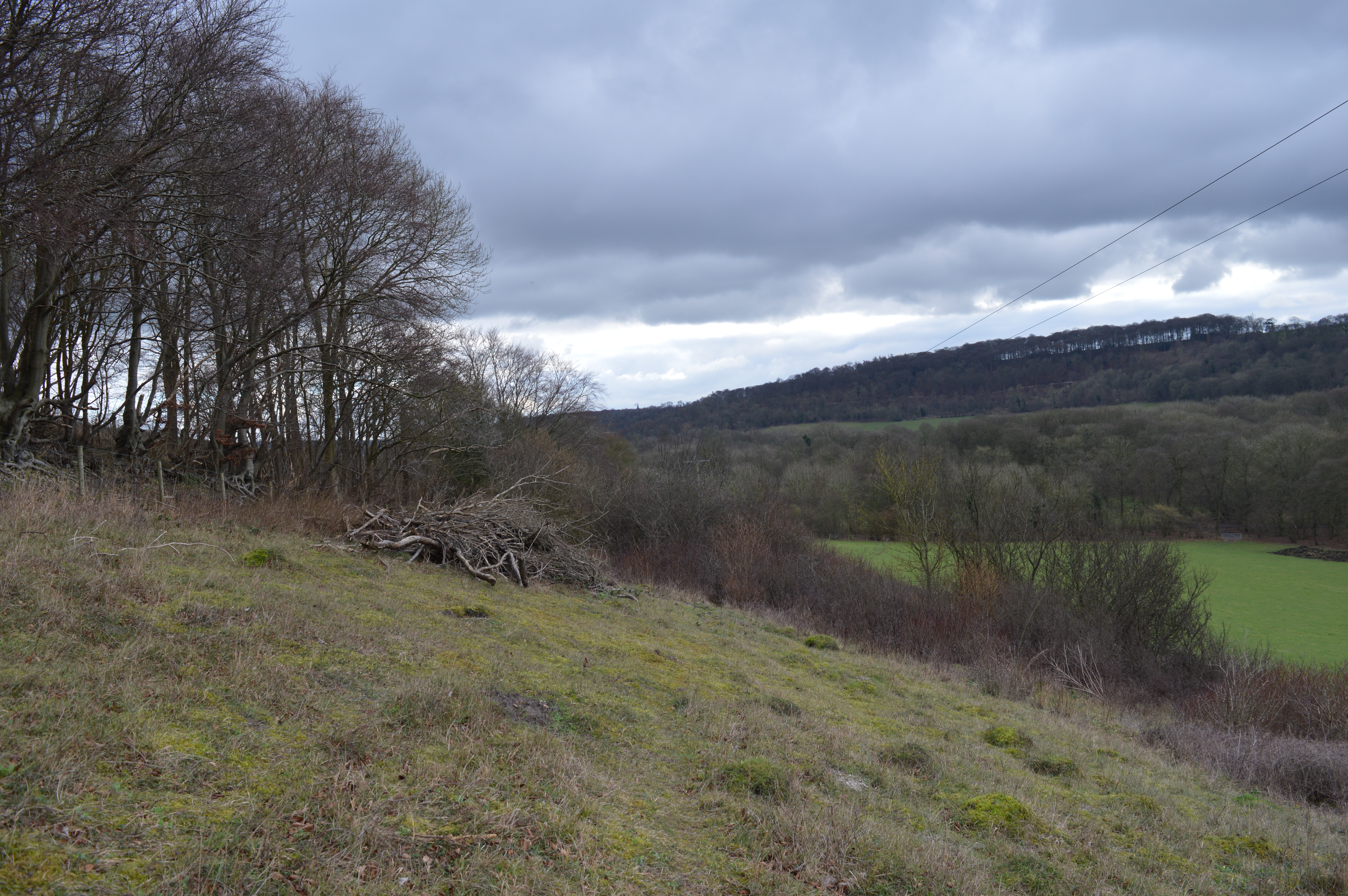
- View of easternmost area and the neighbouring countryside
- Location of Wormsley Chalk Banks.
- Area of search: Buckinghamshire; Oxfordshire
- Grid reference: SU747926 SU751923; SU737932 SU728936; SU745938 SU736958
- Interest: Biological
- Area: 14.1 ha (35 acres)
- Notification date: 1989
- Location map: Magic Map

Wormsley Chalk Banks are six separate areas which together are a 14.1-hectare (35-acre) biological Site of Special Scientific Interest near Turville in Buckinghamshire and Oxfordshire. The site is in the Chilterns Area of Outstanding Natural Beauty.

The site has chalk grassland which is rich in both plant and invertebrate species which have sharply declined nationally. The areas vary, with the dominant grass being sheep's fescue in some, which have the greatest variety of plants, while others with deeper soils have coarser grasses such as upright brome and tall oat-grass. Flowers include bee and fly orchids, the latter of which have become more scarce. Invertebrates include a variety of butterflies, harvest spiders and slow-worms.

Public footpaths cross several of the areas.
