= Rodbed Wood =

Protected area in Buckinghamshire, England

Coordinates: 51.5456°N 0.842°W

- Site of Special Scientific Interest
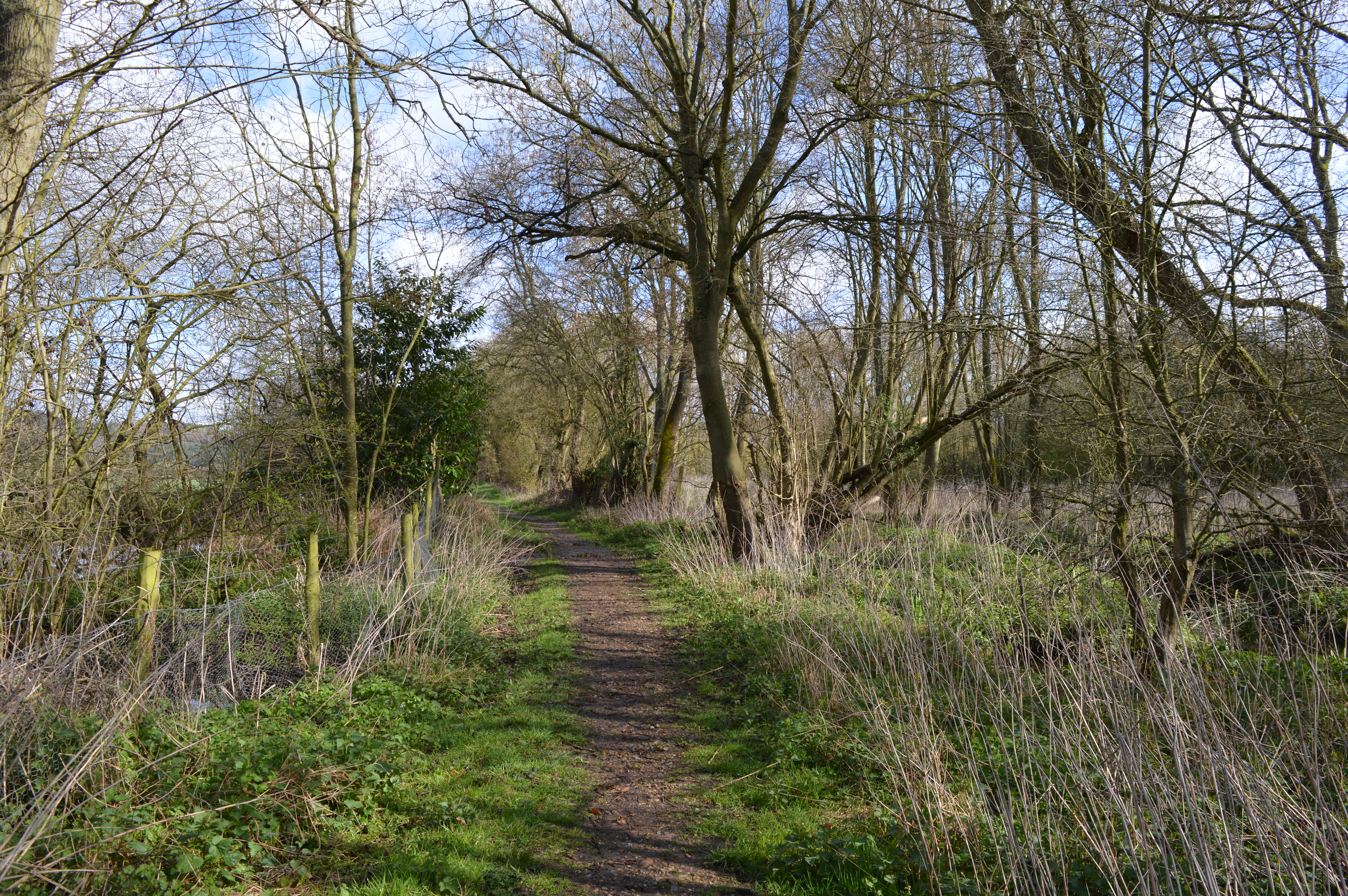
- Location of Rodbed Wood.
- Area of search: Buckinghamshire
- Grid reference: SU804836
- Interest: Biological
- Area: 2.2 ha (5.4 acres)
- Notification date: 1984
- Location map: Magic Map

Rodbed Wood is a 2.2-hectare (5.4-acre) biological Site of Special Scientific Interest in Medmenham in Buckinghamshire. It is in the Chilterns Area of Outstanding Natural Beauty.

The site is wet willow and alder woodland close to the River Thames, fed by a ditch from neighbouring water meadows. The understorey has blackthorn, hawthorn and guelder rose. There is a diverse flora, including the nationally rare summer snowflake. There is a varied bird population and rich invertebrate fauna.

The site is private land, but it is crossed by a public footpath from the A4155 road to the river.
