= Warren Farm, Stewkley =

Farm in Buckinghamshire

Coordinates: 51.9098°N 0.7643°W

- Site of Special Scientific Interest
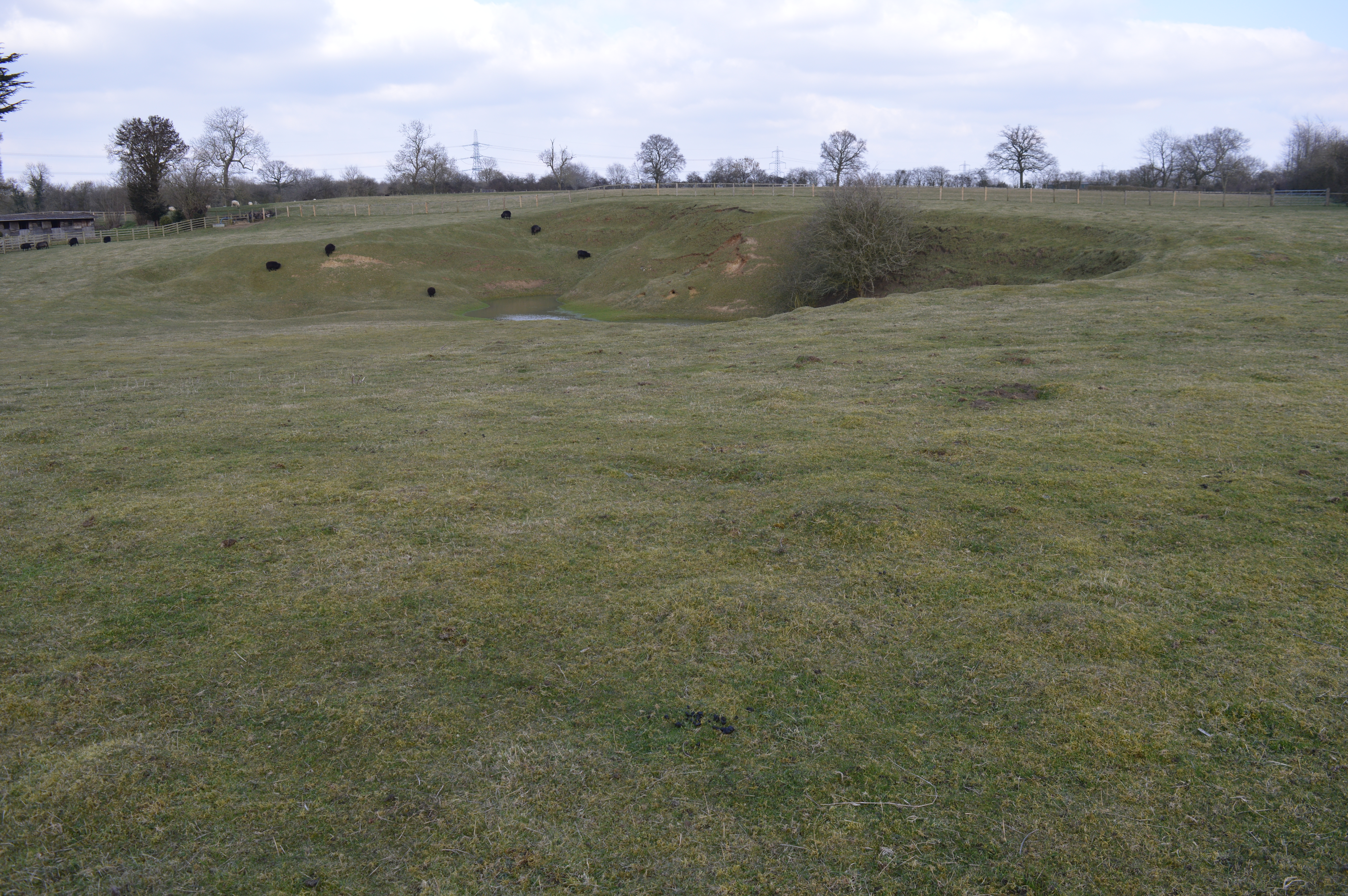
- Location of Warren Farm, Stewkley.
- Area of search: Buckinghamshire
- Grid reference: SP851242
- Interest: Geological
- Area: 1.5 ha (3.7 acres)
- Notification date: 1986
- Location map: Magic Map

Warren Farm, Stewkley is a 1.5-hectare (3.7-acre) geological Site of Special Scientific Interest in Stewkley in Buckinghamshire. It is a Geological Conservation Review site.

This site was first described in the early nineteenth century. It is the most northern exposure of the Jurassic Portlandian basin, and is important for palaeographic reconstruction. It is described by Natural England as "vital to our understanding of the late Jurassic environments, stratigraphy and palaeogeography.

There is no public access to the site, but it can be viewed from a footpath through Warren Farm.
