= Widdenton Park Wood =

Protected area in Buckinghamshire, England

Coordinates: 51.616849°N 0.820652°W

- Site of Special Scientific Interest
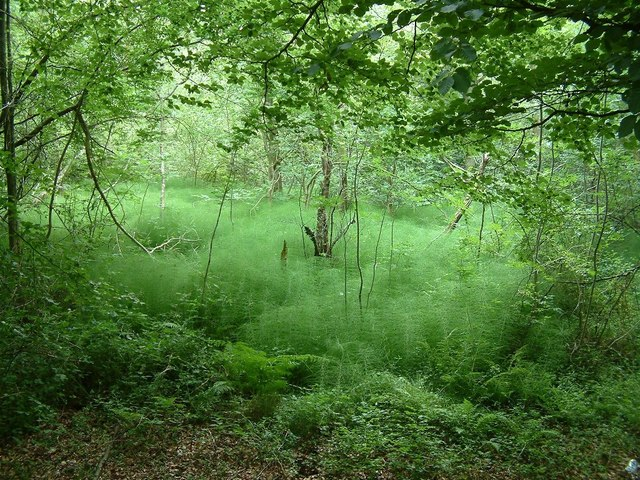
- Spring dominated by horsetail, which gives it an ethereal look
- Location of Widdenton Park Wood.
- Area of search: Buckinghamshire
- Grid reference: SU817915
- Interest: Biological
- Area: 23.5 ha (58 acres)
- Notification date: 1986
- Location map: Magic Map

Widdenton Park Wood is a 23.5-hectare (58-acre) Site of Special Scientific Interest west of High Wycombe in Buckinghamshire. It is on the site of a medieval deer park going back to the fourteenth century, and most of it is in the Chilterns Area of Outstanding Natural Beauty.

The wood is ancient semi-natural oak-beech woodland, which supports a varied flora including several uncommon species. The most important feature is a number of extensive spring-fed mires, dominated by willow and birch. There are also areas of beech woodland and marshy grassland.

The site is open to the public, and there is access by footpaths from Marlow Road.
