= Aston Rowant Woods =

Coordinates: 51.6794°N 0.9167°W

- Site of Special Scientific Interest
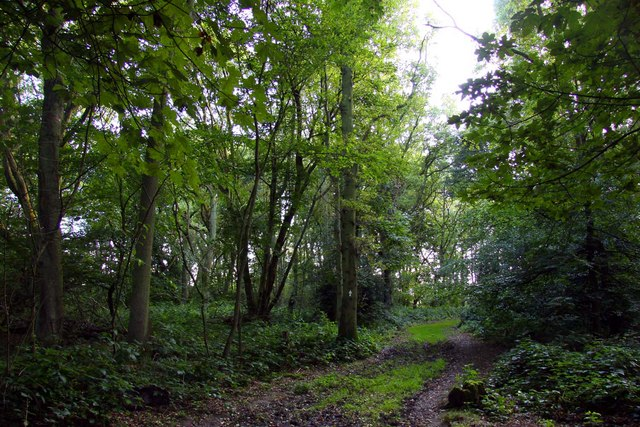
- Footpath in Aston Wood
- Location of Aston Rowant Woods.
- Area of search: Oxfordshire; Buckinghamshire
- Grid reference: SU750984
- Interest: Biological
- Area: 209.7 hectares (518 acres)
- Notification date: 1986
- Location map: Magic Map

Aston Rowant Woods is a 209.7-hectare (518-acre) biological Site of Special Scientific Interest near Aston Rowant in Oxfordshire and Buckinghamshire. Part of it is in Aston Rowant National Nature Reserve, and a large part is in the Chiltern Beechwoods Special Area of Conservation. The site is also in the Chilterns Area of Outstanding Natural Beauty.

The site is described by Natural England as "of national importance as a large, unfragmented area of ancient semi-natural woodland characteristic of the Chilterns scarp". It is composed of Grove Wood, Aston Wood, Juniper Bank, Kingston Wood, High Wood and Crowell Wood. Flora include 52 species indicative of ancient woods, and there are over 100 species of fungi, while damp hollows and fallen trees provide diverse habitats for invertebrates. Uncommon species include the herb Paris quadrifolia and the flower green hellebore. There are small areas of scrub and chalk grassland.
