= Buttlers Hangings =

Protected area in Buckinghamshire, England

Coordinates: 51.6587°N 0.8203°W

- Site of Special Scientific Interest
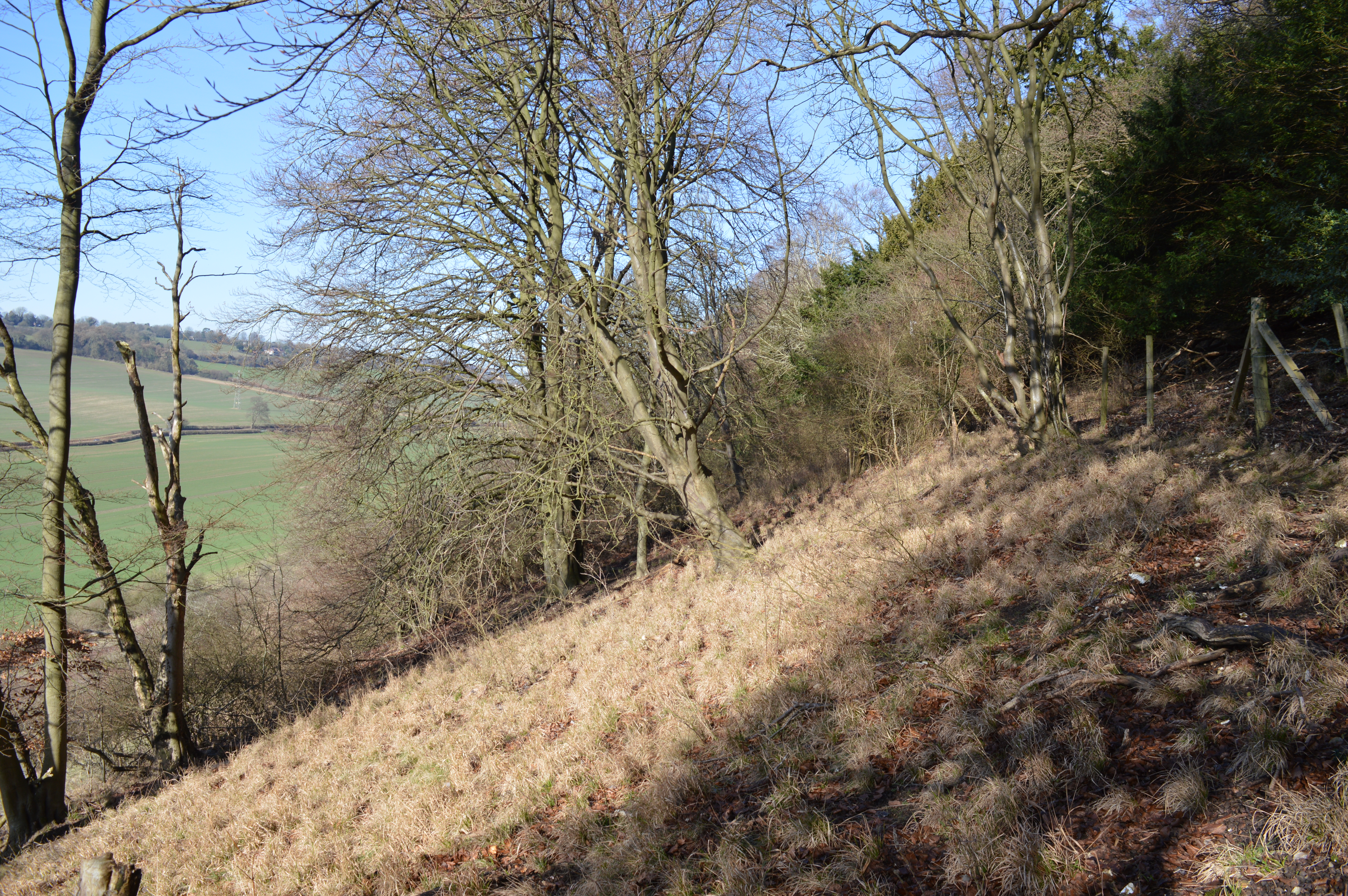
- Location of Buttlers Hangings.
- Area of search: Buckinghamshire
- Grid reference: SU817962
- Interest: Biological
- Area: 3.9 ha (9.6 acres)
- Notification date: 1984
- Location map: Magic Map

Buttlers Hangings is a 3.9-hectare (9.6-acre) Site of Special Scientific Interest north of West Wycombe in Buckinghamshire. It is in the Chilterns Area of Outstanding Natural Beauty.

The site is steeply sloping grassland and scrub which has a wide variety of plant species. There are many rabbit burrows and a badger sett. Invertebrates include colonies of chalkland butterflies and four endangered Red Book spiders. Other insects include yellow meadow ants, thorn-hoppers and a rare weevil, Ceutorhynchus unguicularis. Fourteen snail species have been recorded.

There is access by footpaths from West Wycombe Hill and Slough Lane.
