= Moorend Common =

Site of scientific interest in Buckinghamshire, England

Coordinates: 51.608076°N 0.842541°W

- Site of Special Scientific Interest
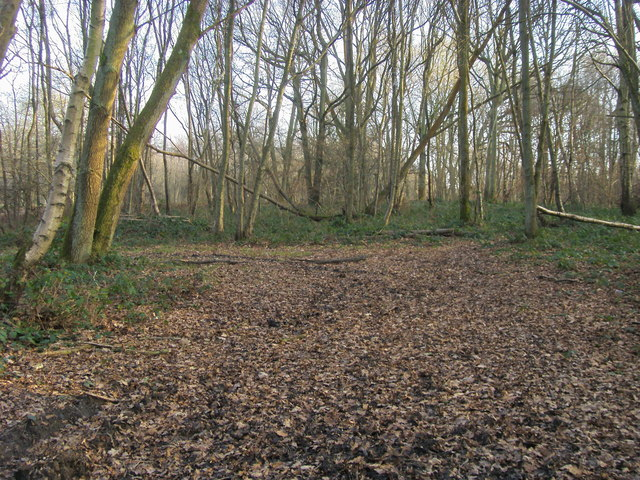
- Location of Moorend Common.
- Area of search: Buckinghamshire
- Grid reference: SU802905
- Interest: Biological
- Area: 28.0 ha (69 acres)
- Notification date: 1985
- Location map: Magic Map

Moorend Common is a 28-hectare (69-acre) Site of Special Scientific Interest in the hamlet Moor End, west of High Wycombe in Buckinghamshire. It is in the Chilterns Areas of Outstanding Natural Beauty, and it is owned and managed by Lane End Parish Council.

The site is on London Clay, which is unusual for the Chilterns, and the soil is acid and sometimes waterlogged. Habitats are grassland, heath, woodland, marsh and scrub. A stream ends in a swallow-hole called Gubbins Hole. There are three types of woodland, beech, oak and birch, and a small area planted with larch and pine, with ground flora of bracken and bramble. Marshy areas have heath spotted orchid and bog mosses.

There is access from Church Road, which passes through the site.
