= Stone SSSI, Buckinghamshire =

Protected area in Buckinghamshire, England

Coordinates: 51.80708°N 0.87226°W

Stone
- Site of Special Scientific Interest
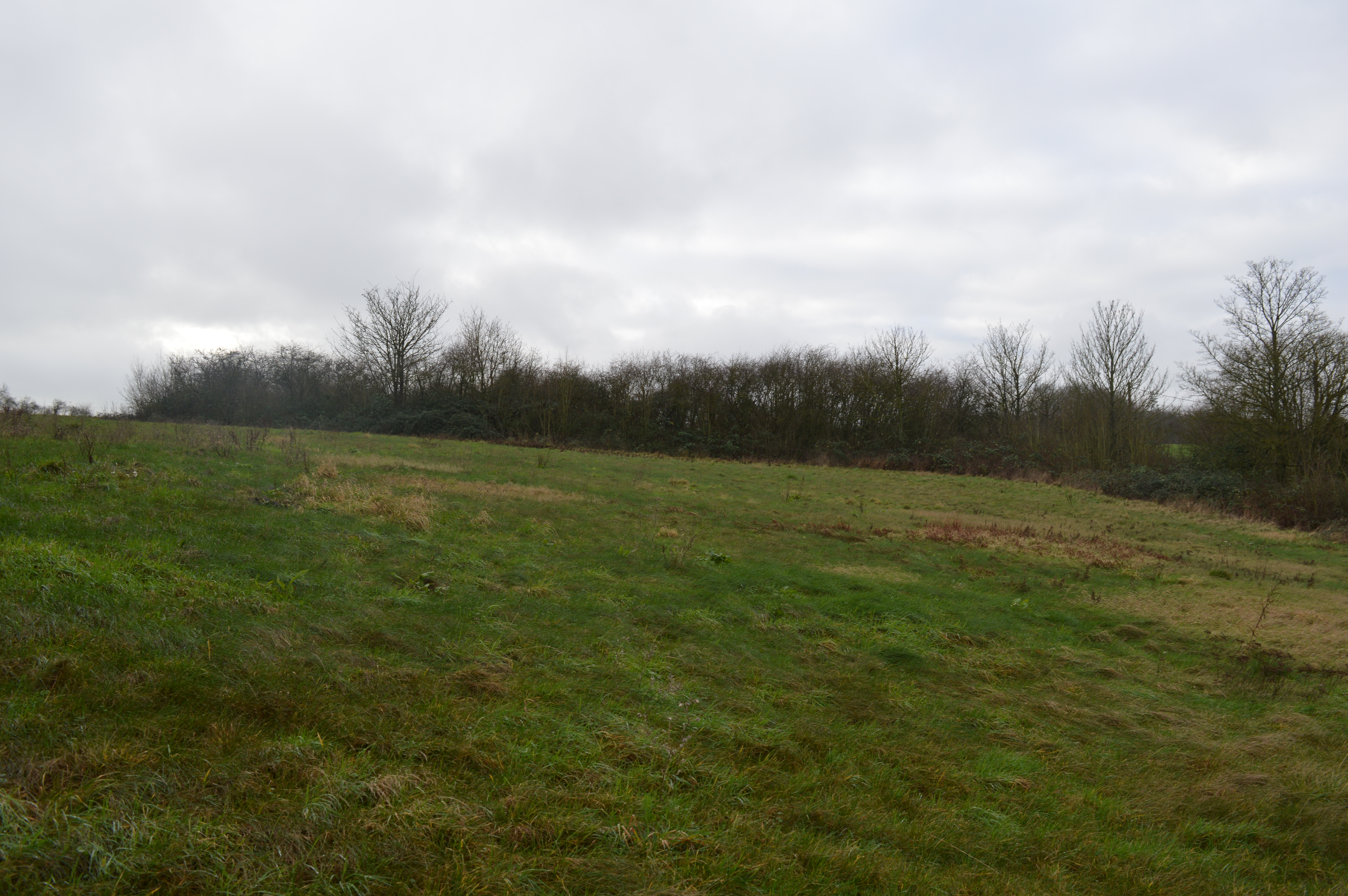
- Location of Stone.
- Area of search: Buckinghamshire
- Grid reference: SP778126
- Interest: Geological
- Area: 0.1 ha (0.25 acres)
- Notification date: 1995
- Location map: Magic Map

Stone SSSI is a 0.12-hectare (0.30-acre) geological Site of Special Scientific Interest in Stone in Buckinghamshire. It is listed by the Joint Nature Conservation Committee as a Geological Conservation Review site.

This site has undated sands of Lower Cretaceous Wealden deposits. The sand is of northern origin, probably recycled through the Portland Beds, and includes Carboniferous chert. The site is important for its bearing on the palaeogeography of the Wealden and the preceding Purbeck deposits.

The pit has been filled in, and it is on private land with no public access.
