= Swain's Wood =

Protected area in Buckinghamshire, England

Coordinates: 51.622422°N 0.933183°W

- Site of Special Scientific Interest
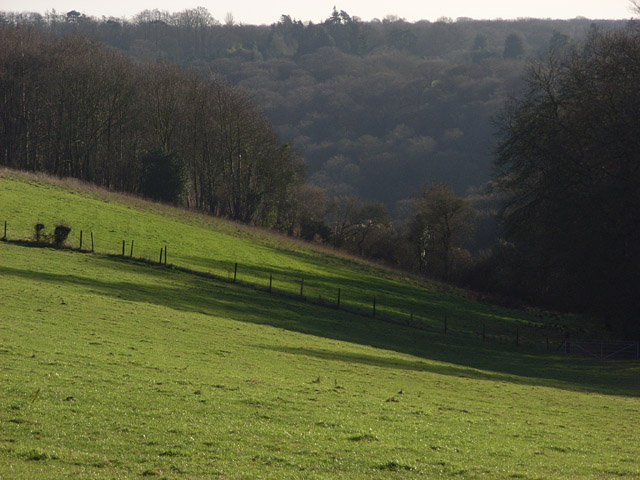
- Pasture with Swain's Wood on the right
- Location of Swain's Wood.
- Area of search: Buckinghamshire
- Grid reference: SU739920
- Interest: Biological
- Area: 16.2 ha (40 acres)
- Notification date: 1985
- Location map: Magic Map

Swain's Wood is a 16.2-hectare (40-acre) biological Site of Special Scientific Interest west of Turville in Buckinghamshire. It is in the Chilterns Area of Outstanding Natural Beauty, and is managed by the Berkshire, Buckinghamshire and Oxfordshire Wildlife Trust.

The site is in the upper slopes of a valley, with grassland and scrub, flanked by woodland on both sides. The grassland has varied plant and invertebrate species, including several which are rare, such as the spiders Tapinocyboides pygmaea and Phrurolithus minimus. Around 117 species of spider and over 160 of butterflies and moths have been recorded. Some woodland appears to be ancient; some areas are mainly beech with others mixed. Flowers include orchids, primroses and cowslips.

A permit from the wildlife trust is required for access.
