= Kingcup Meadows and Oldhouse Wood =

Protected area in Buckinghamshire, England

Coordinates: 51.555°N 0.516°W

- Site of Special Scientific Interest
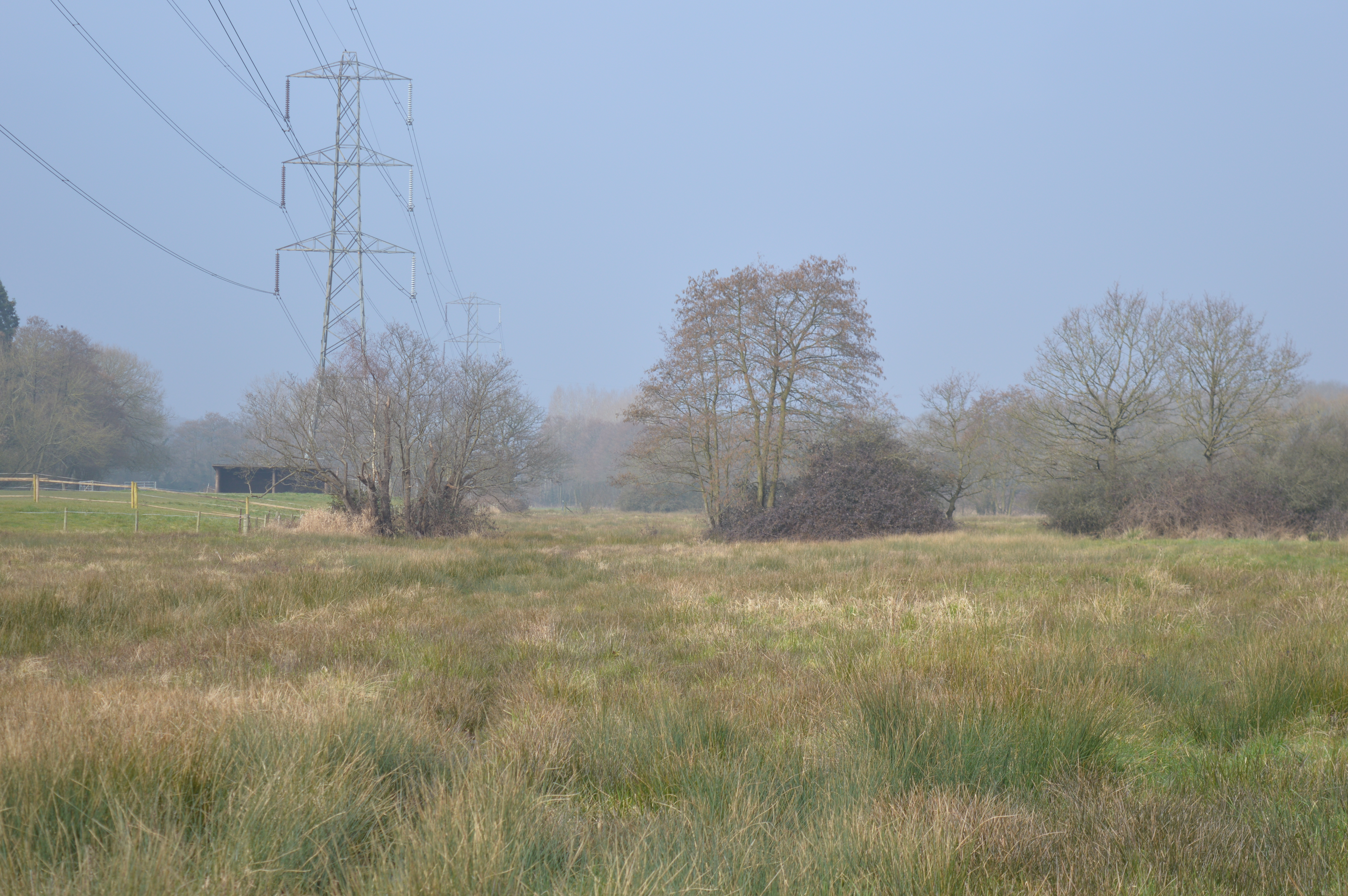
- Kingcup Meadows
- Location of Kingcup Meadows and Oldhouse Wood.
- Area of search: Buckinghamshire
- Grid reference: TQ030851
- Interest: Biological
- Area: 13.2 ha (33 acres)
- Notification date: 1992
- Location map: Magic Map

Kingcup Meadows and Oldhouse Wood is a 13.2-hectare (33-acre) biological Site of Special Scientific Interest south of Denham in Buckinghamshire.

The site is a mosaic of different habitats next to the River Alder Bourne, including unimproved pasture and woodland. The meadows have dry and wet grassland, swamp and fen. The eastern fields are grazed by cattle and the eastern ones, which are drier, have a late hay crop. Grasses include red fescue and in drier areas and creeping bent in wetter ones. Oldhouse Wood has ash and field maple on upper slopes and oak and birch on lower ones. There are several species of dragonfly.

There is access from a road between Copse Hill Farm and Willetts Lane.
