= Froghall Brickworks =

Protected area in Buckinghamshire, England

Coordinates: 51.6372°N 0.5896°W

- Site of Special Scientific Interest
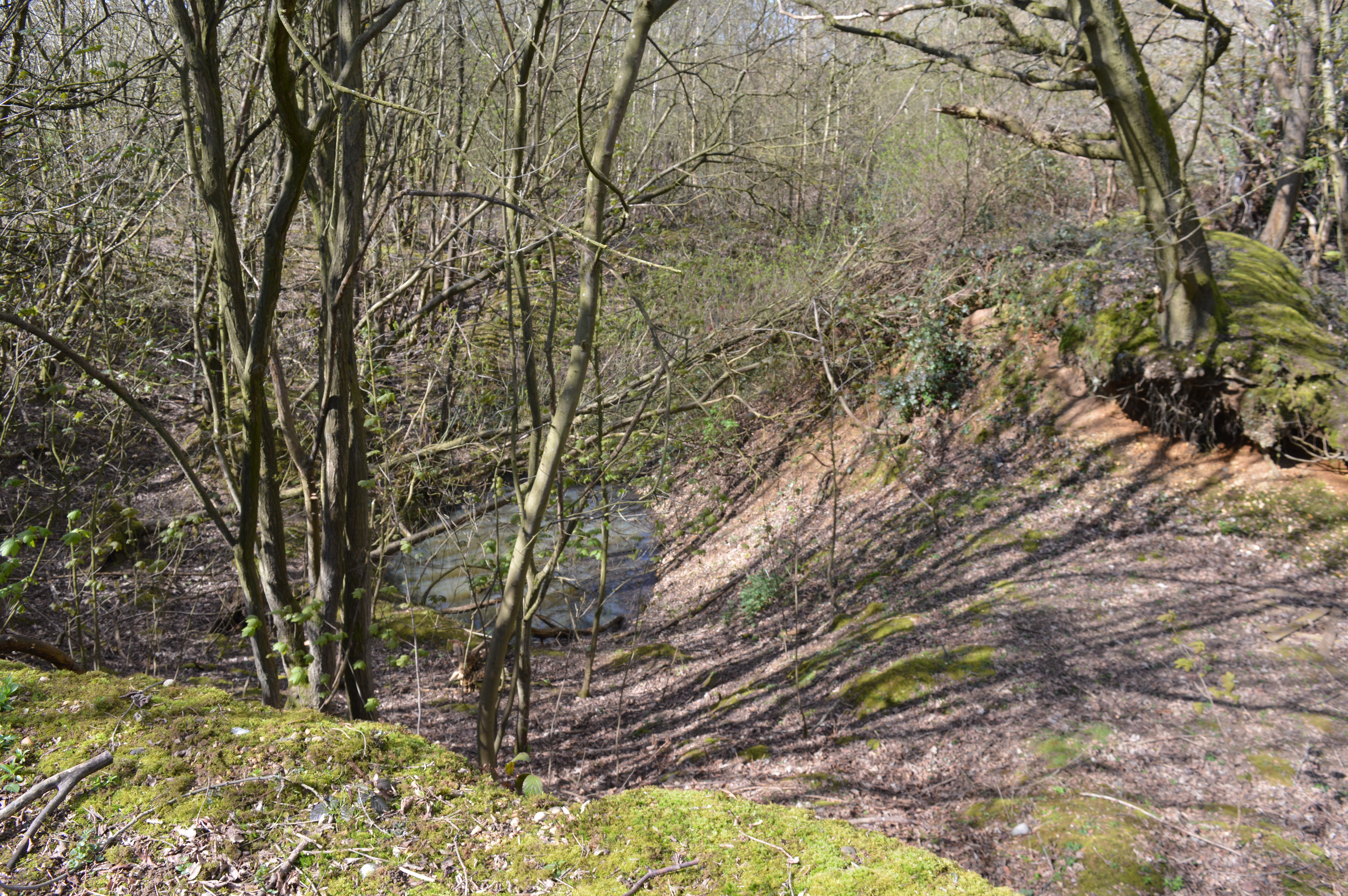
- Location of Froghall Brickworks.
- Area of search: Buckinghamshire
- Grid reference: SU977941
- Interest: Geological
- Area: 0.3 ha (0.74 acres)
- Notification date: 1989
- Location map: Magic Map

Froghall Brickworks is a 0.26-hectare (0.64-acre) geological Site of Special Scientific Interest east of Chalfont St Giles in Buckinghamshire.

The site is Pleistocene gravel above Reading beds. The gravel was deposited by the proto-River Thames, before it was diverted south by the Anglian Ice Age around 450,000 years ago. It is described by Natural England as very important because it is the only known exposure of the Westland Green Gravel in the Middle Thames area.

The site is on private land with no public access.
