= Frieth Meadows =

Site of Special Scientific Interest in Frieth, Buckinghamshire, England

Coordinates: 51.6081°N 0.84687°W

- Site of Special Scientific Interest
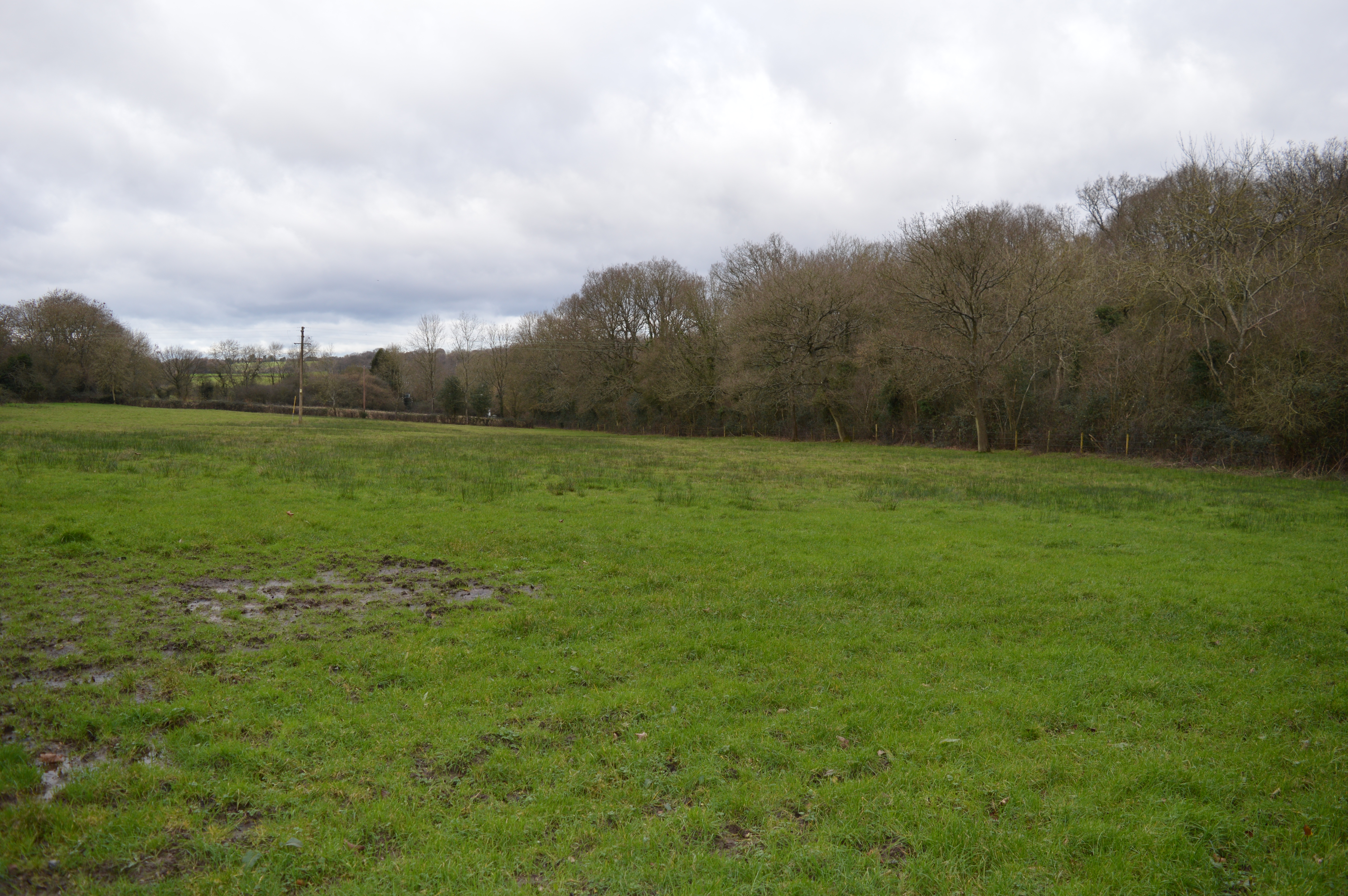
- Location of Frieth Meadows.
- Area of search: Buckinghamshire
- Grid reference: SU799905
- Interest: Biological
- Area: 2.5 ha (6.2 acres)
- Notification date: 1986
- Location map: Magic Map

Frieth Meadows is a 2.5-hectare (6.2-acre) Site of Special Scientific Interest in Frieth in Buckinghamshire. It is in the Chilterns Area of Outstanding Natural Beauty.

The site consists of traditionally managed and unimproved meadows on neutral to acid soils. Plants include quaking grass, green-winged orchid, lousewort and devil's bit scabious. Hedgerows provide shelter for small mammals and birds, and both the grassland and hedges have a wide range of invertebrates.

There is no public access to the site but it can be viewed from Shogmoor Lane.
