= Bolter End =

Hamlet in Buckinghamshire, England

Coordinates: 51°37′24″N 0°50′58″W

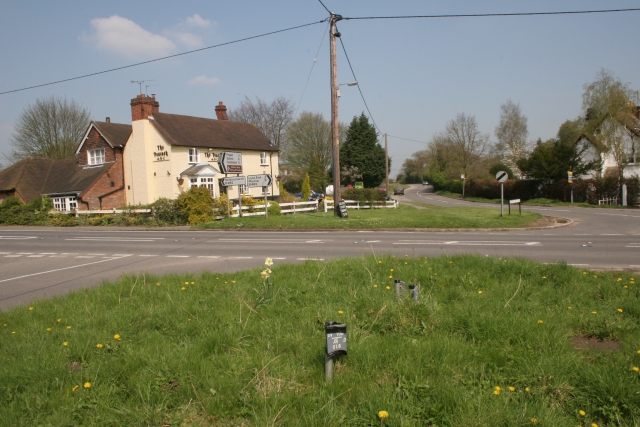

Bolter End is a hamlet 5 mi (8.0 km) to the west of High Wycombe in Buckinghamshire, England.

Bolter End lies on the B482 road that connects Stokenchurch and Marlow between Cadmore End and Lane End and where it is crossed by the Piddington to Fingest road. Bolter End is part of Lane End (Where the population was included) civil parish and is within Wycombe district. Bolter End Sand Pit is a Site of Special Scientific Interest.
