= Bolter End Sand Pit =

Protected area in Bolter End, Buckinghamshire, England

Coordinates: 51.620703°N 0.846554°W

- Site of Special Scientific Interest
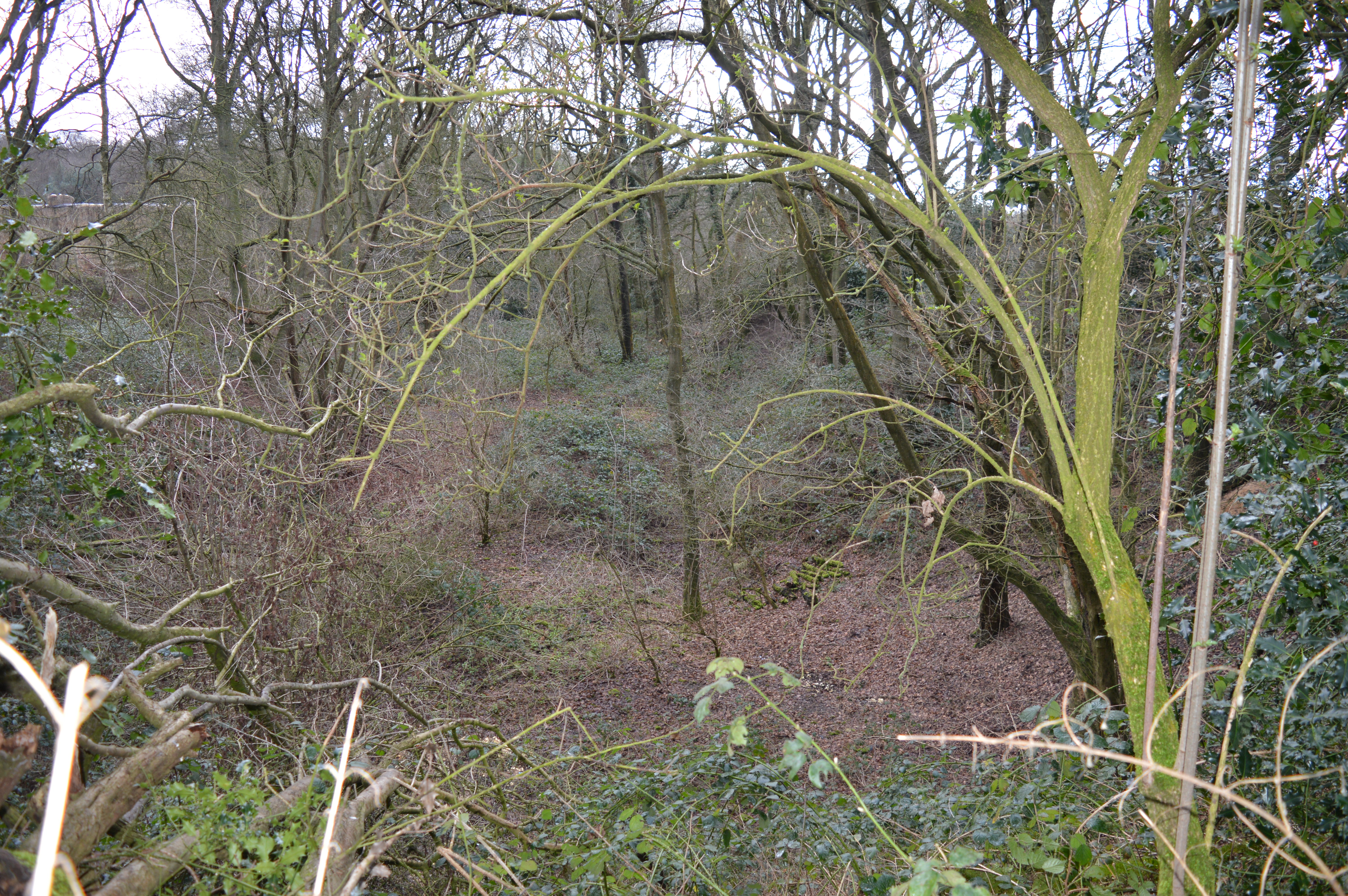
- Location of Bolter End Sand Pit.
- Area of search: Buckinghamshire
- Grid reference: SU799919
- Interest: Geological
- Area: 0.33 ha (0.82 acres)
- Notification date: 1988
- Location map: Magic Map

Bolter End Sand Pit is a 0.33-hectare (0.82-acre) geological Site of Special Scientific Interest at Bolter End Common in Buckinghamshire.

The site is a disused pit with steep banks, overgrown, on private land with no public access. It is conserved as a marginal facies of the Reading Formation found in the Lane End area containing beds of quartz and lydite gravel not found elsewhere in the formation and capped by a rare outcropping of London Clay proving the inclusions are an original part of the sequence and not a later addition.

The inclusions are significant because they provide paleogeographic evidence for a riverine sequence bringing Early Cretaceous and Jurassic material, from a breach in the chalk in a north-westerly direction, to the Eocene sediments of the Reading Formation found at Lane End

It was first studied by H.J Osborne White in 1906 at a different site south east of Lane End Holy Trinity Church where it was noted:

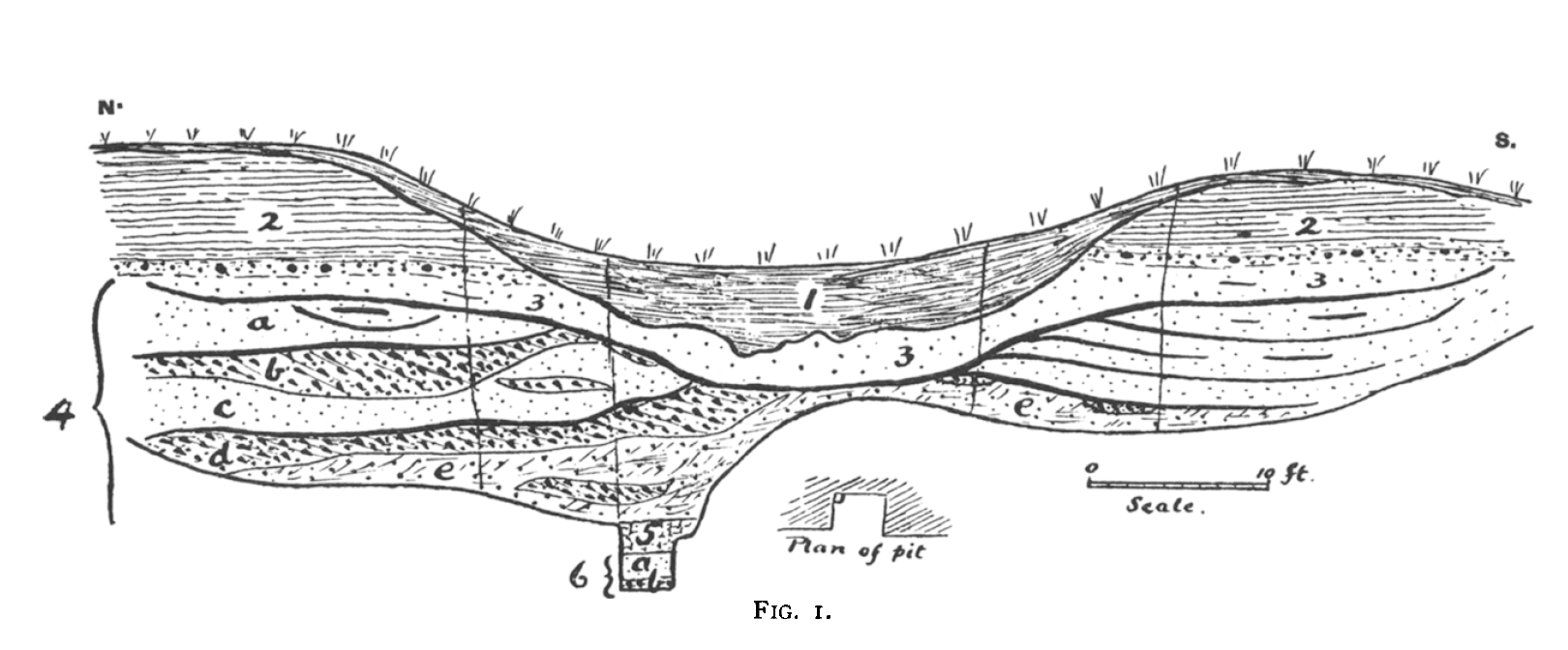

"The interest of the above section centres in the beds and lenses of gravel and gravelly sand {Section 4}. Brecciate and conglomeratic beds, consisting of angular and rounded pieces of clay in a sandy matrix, are of common occurrence in the Reading series; subangular flints, also, have been noted in many places (though rarely in such quantities as here), but I can find no record of the occurrence of gravel abounding in pebbles of quartz and lydite in that series in any part of the London Basin." - White 1906

This Lane End pit became disused and was partially re-examined by S. W. Wooldridge and D. M. C. Gill in 1924 wherein he also described the Bolter End pit as displaying the same gravel features. Although the Bolter End pit is not capped by the London Clay, its horizon can be determined by the nearby Finings Wood and is not in doubt. Wooldridge further described the features in 1934 with additional evidence from the reservoir construction at Widdenton Park Wood, companion water tower at Finings Wood and associated pipe trenches.

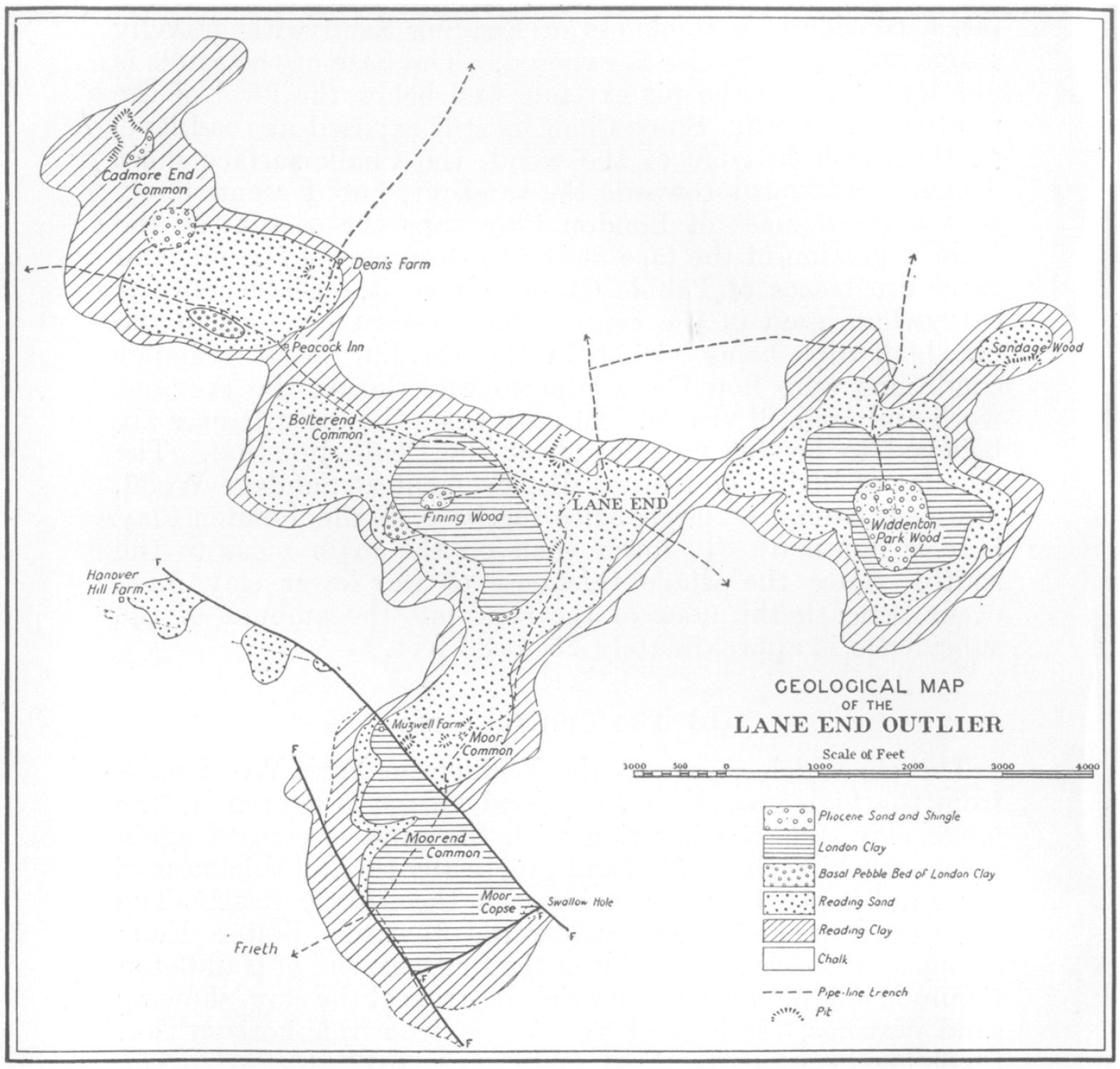

"We are led to envisage a river, following this belt and flowing in a fluctuating course over the surface of the Landenian delta-plain. This river was probably one of the main north-westerly affluents of the so-called "Eocene Amazon", which followed the axis of the London Basin depression in Eocene times. Further evidence of the existence of this north-westerly river, or of a related parallel stream, is forthcoming near Denham." - Wooldridge 1934

There are no currently visible features of the pit and the interest could readily be investigated at any number of locations in the surrounding area. The pit does benefit from a chalk permeable floor and does not fill up with water in the wet season. However, through the later half of the 20th century, the pit had a reputation as a local unlicensed fly-tipping site. This waste was cleared in the early 2000s, however much of the waste was simply reburied in the deep chalk pits potentially creating an environmental hazard.
