= Dancersend Waterworks =

Protected area in Buckinghamshire, England

Coordinates: 51.772793°N 0.687599°W

- Site of Special Scientific Interest
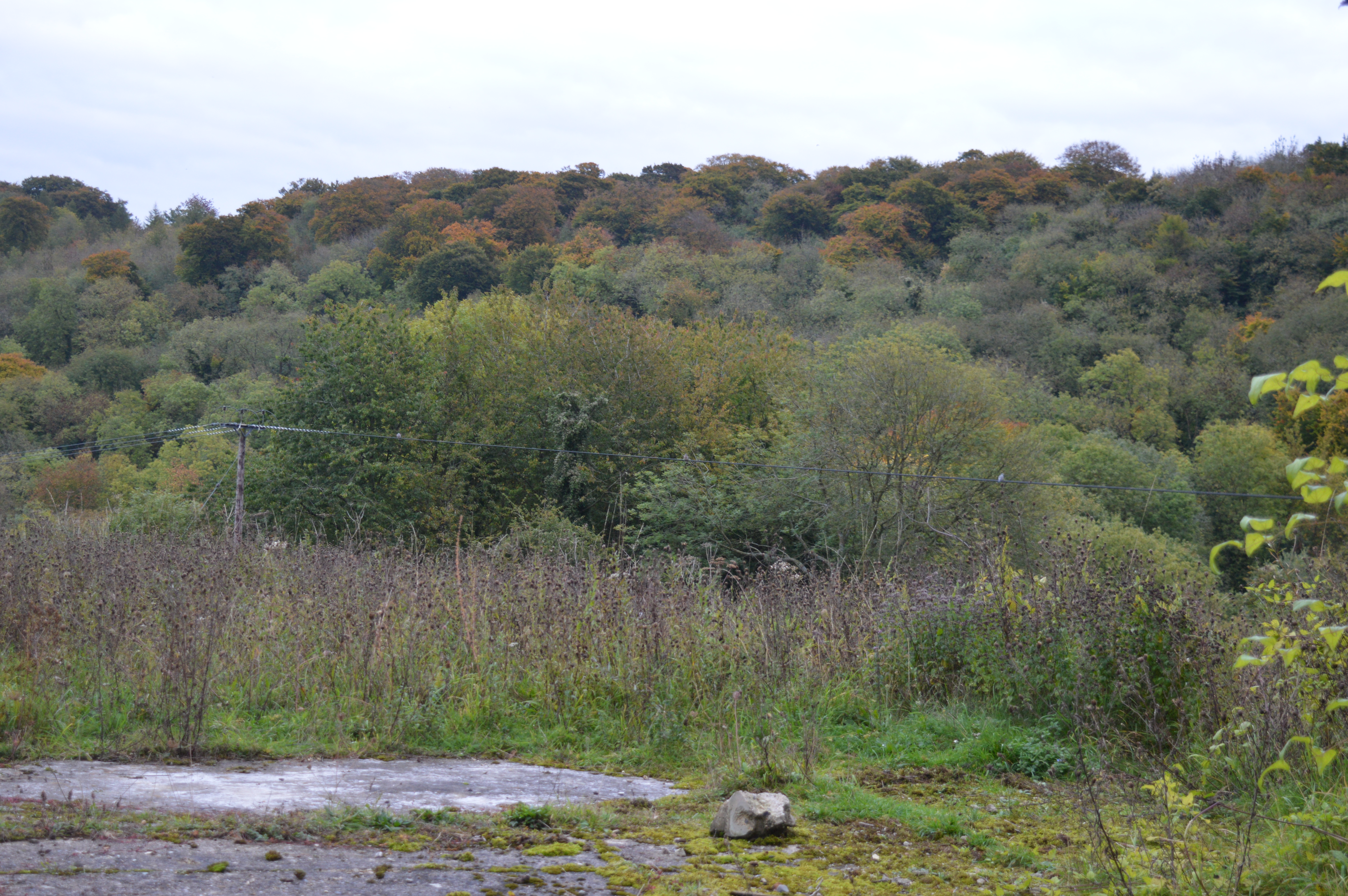
- Location of Dancersend Waterworks.
- Area of search: Buckinghamshire
- Grid reference: SP906090
- Interest: Biological
- Area: 4.0 ha (9.9 acres)
- Notification date: 1989
- Location map: Magic Map

Dancersend Waterworks is a 4-hectare biological Site of Special Scientific Interest in Spencersgreen south of Aston Clinton in Buckinghamshire. It was formerly a private waterworks supplying the Rothschild Dancersend estate, and is now owned by Thames Water. It is in the Chilterns Area of Outstanding Natural Beauty. A cooling pond within the Thames Water site is a Grade II listed building.

The site is an area of artificial banks, basins and plateaux in a chalk valley bottom, which has an unusually wide variety of herbs, grasses and shrubs. There is a badger sett and a range of butterfly and bird species. Grassland areas are rich in orchids, and there is some scrub and woodland.

The site on Bottom Road has no public access.
