= Parmoor =

Hamlet in Buckinghamshire, England

Coordinates: 51.59697°N 0.85654°W

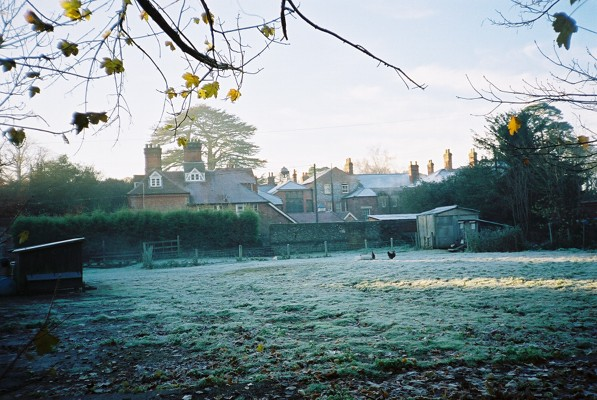
St Katherine's Convent, Parmoor.

Parmoor is a hamlet to the south of Frieth in the parish of Hambleden, in Buckinghamshire, England. It has a Site of Special Scientific Interest, Fayland Chalk Bank.

In the 1870s, Parmoor House was the home of Henry Cripps, Q.C.. His son Charles Cripps, who inherited it in 1899, was ennobled in 1914 and took the title Baron Parmoor of Frieth. It was the birthplace of Sir Stafford Cripps, the post-war Chancellor of the Exchequer.

Between 1941 and 1946, the exiled King Zog of Albania lived at Parmoor House. King Zog lived with his wife Queen Geraldine, their son Crown Prince Leka, and the King's sisters, nephews and nieces. The King had a group of bodyguards who lived nearby and some Ministers who lived at Lane End.

In 1947, the Anglican Community of St Katharine of Alexandria moved to Parmoor House from Fulham to provide care for elderly ladies. In 1995 Mother Christine gave the house and grounds to Sue Ryder on behalf of the Sue Ryder Prayer Fellowship, an independent charity which is quite separate from her better known eponymous charity. St Katharine's, Parmoor is now a retreat home and conference centre welcoming all for day or residential visits.
