= Old Rectory Meadows =

Coordinates: 51.576°N 0.5107°W

- Site of Special Scientific Interest
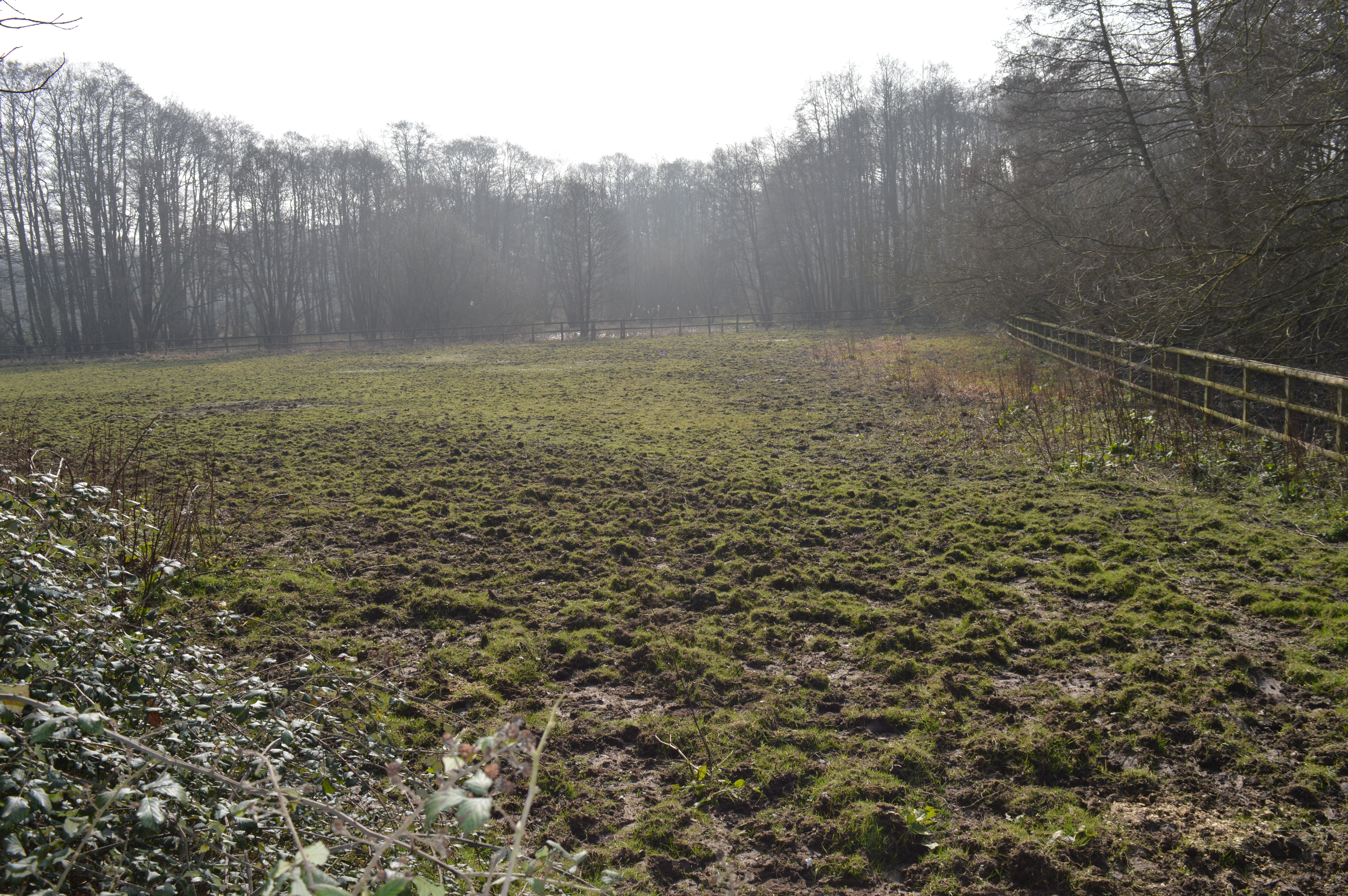
- Location of Old Rectory Meadows.
- Area of search: Buckinghamshire
- Grid reference: TQ033874
- Interest: Biological
- Area: 7.9 ha (20 acres)
- Notification date: 1982
- Location map: Magic Map

Old Rectory Meadows is a 7.9-hectare (20-acre) Site of Special Scientific Interest in Denham in Buckinghamshire.

This site on the bank of the River Misbourne has wet alluvial and water meadows, marsh and alder carr woodland. It has plants which are rare in the county such as marsh arrowgrass, and its irregular structure provides a suitable habitat for insects.

It is private land with no public access.
