= Poker's Pond Meadow =

Biological site in Buckinghamshire, England

Coordinates: 51.9436°N 0.7226°W

- Site of Special Scientific Interest
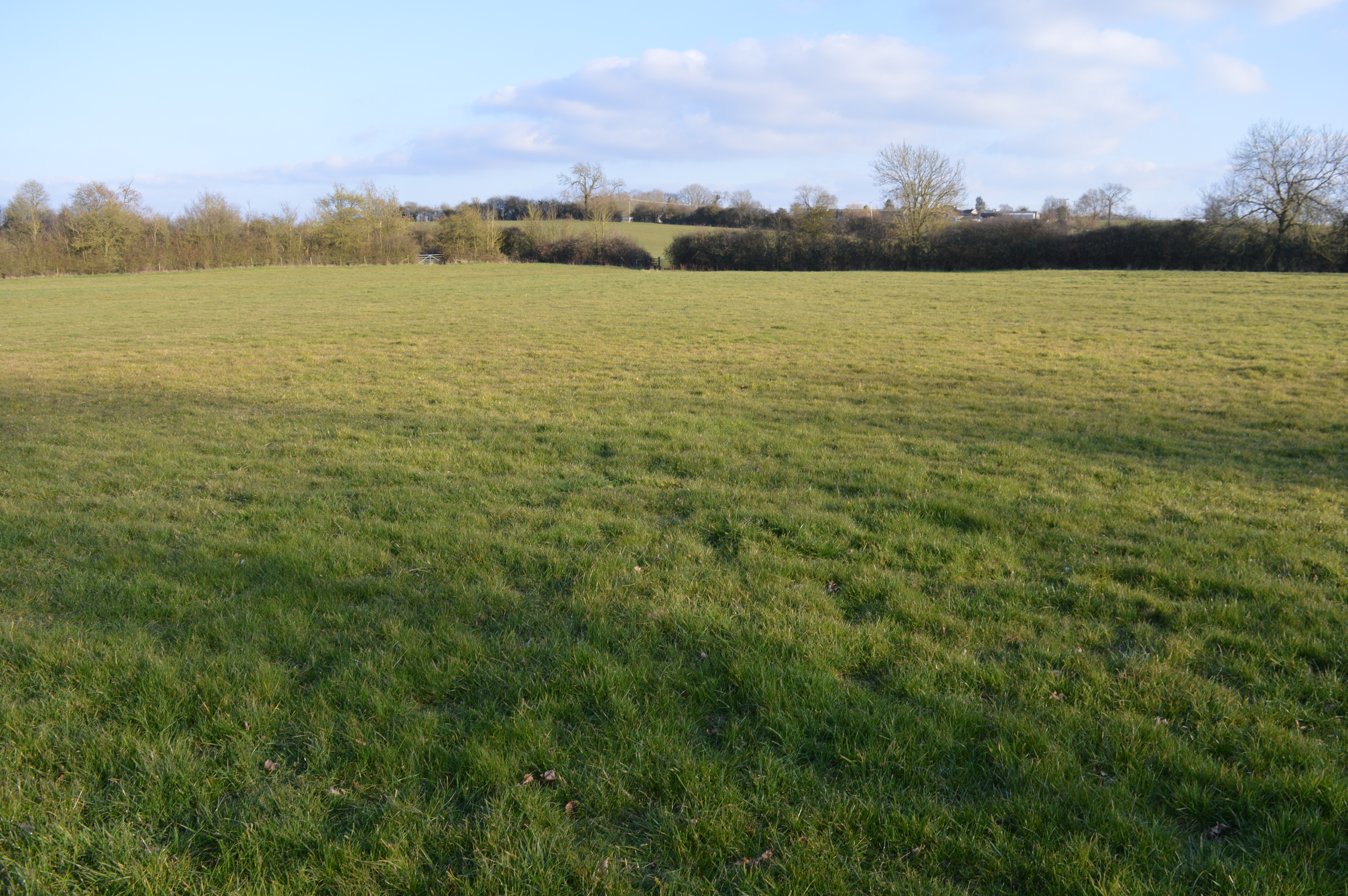
- Location of Poker's Pond Meadow.
- Area of search: Buckinghamshire
- Grid reference: SP879280
- Interest: Biological
- Area: 1.9 ha (4.7 acres)
- Notification date: 1992
- Location map: Magic Map

Poker's Pond Meadow is a 1.9-hectare (4.7-acre) biological Site of Special Scientific Interest south of Stoke Hammond in Buckinghamshire.

The site is one of the few small areas of ancient hay meadow in the Vale of Aylesbury. It has been traditionally managed, with a hay cut followed by cattle grazing, and no use of herbicides or fertilisers. One area has the remains of medieval ridge and furrow ploughing. There is a marshy area where there was formerly a pond, but most of the field is dry grassland, with an unusually wide variety of plants, and over 100 species of grasses, sedges, herbs and rushes have been recorded. The main grasses are sweet vernal grass and Yorkshire fog.

It is private land with no public access.
