= Fayland Chalk Bank =

Protected area in Buckinghamshire, England

Coordinates: 51.5921°N 0.8646°W

- Site of Special Scientific Interest
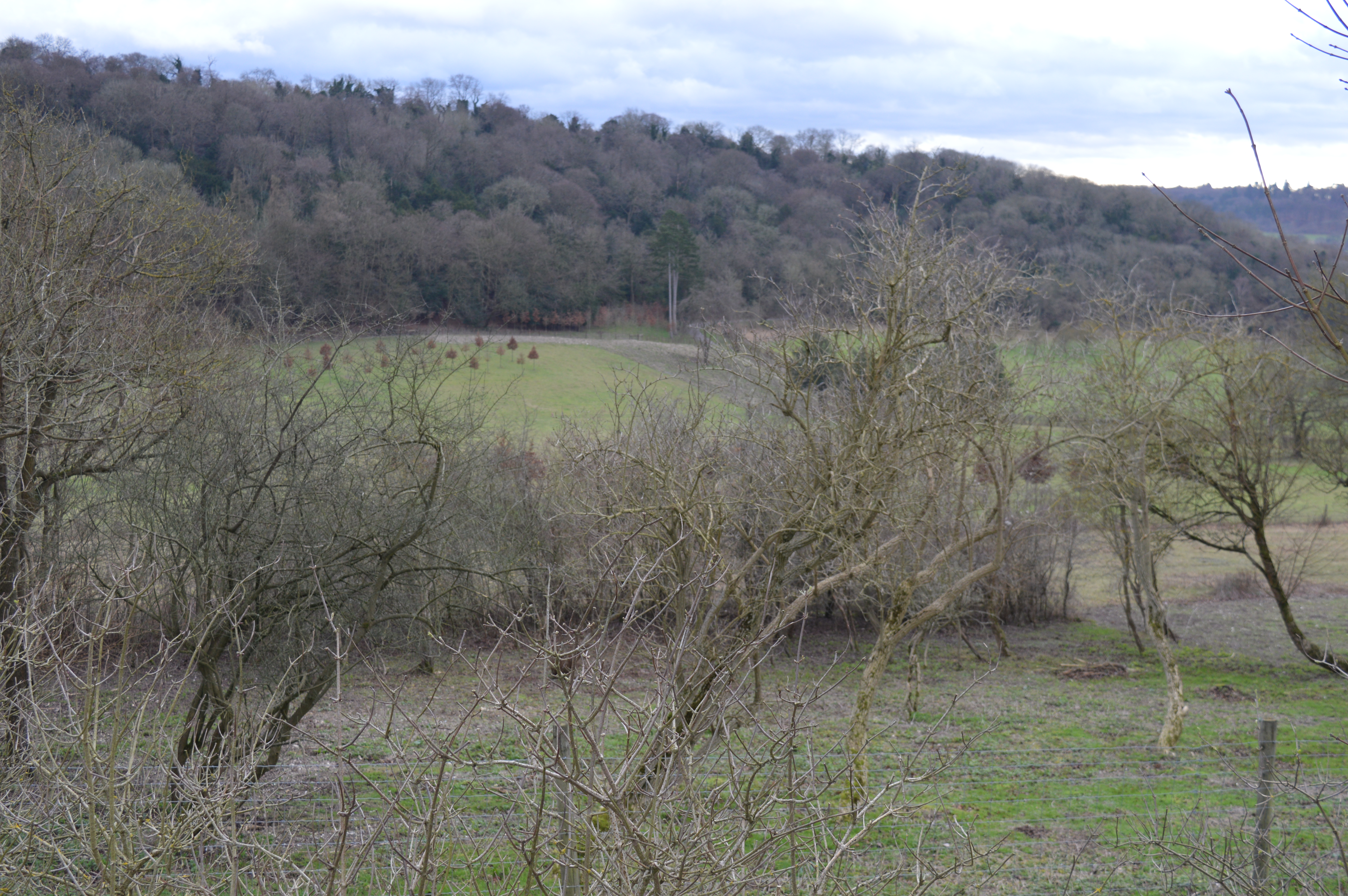
- Location of Fayland Chalk Bank.
- Area of search: Buckinghamshire
- Grid reference: SU787887
- Interest: Biological
- Area: 0.6 ha (1.5 acres)
- Notification date: 1989
- Location map: Magic Map

Fayland Chalk Bank is a 0.6-hectare (1.5-acre) Site of Special Scientific Interest in Parmoor, south of Lane End in Buckinghamshire. It is in the Chilterns Area of Outstanding Natural Beauty.

The site is chalk grassland which has a diverse flora. The main grasses are red fescue, quaking grass and yellow oat grass. Orchids include the common spotted and pyramidal, and the profusion of chalk flowers and its south facing location make the site important for bees, grasshoppers and butterflies.

The site is on private land with no public access.
