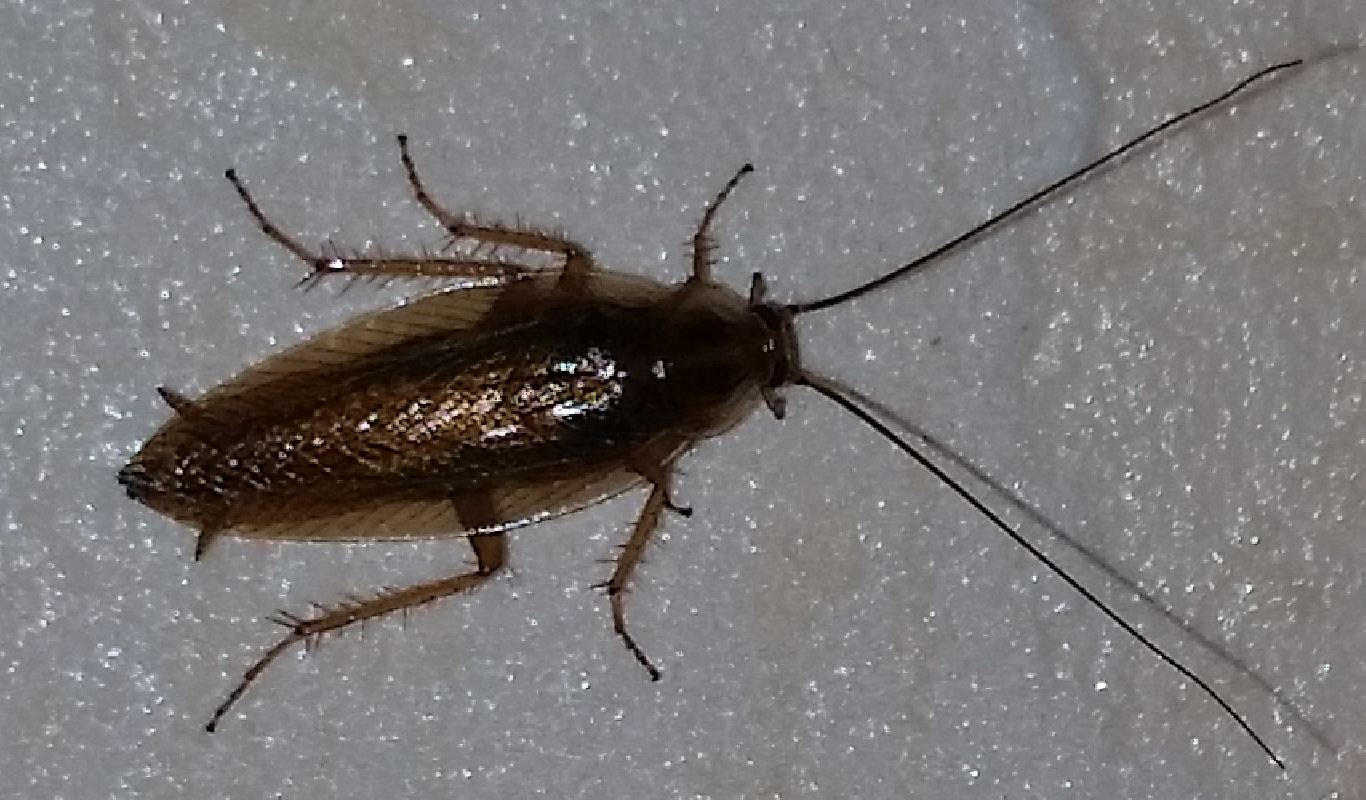

Scientific classification
- Kingdom: Animalia
- Phylum: Arthropoda
- Clade: Pancrustacea
- Class: Insecta
- Order: Blattodea
- Family: Ectobiidae
- Genus: Ectobius
- Species: E. lapponicus

Binomial name
- Ectobius lapponicus (Linnaeus, 1758)

= Ectobius lapponicus =

Species of cockroach

Ectobius lapponicus, also known as the dusky cockroach, is a species of cockroach found in Europe, northern Asia (excluding China), the northeastern United States, and southeastern Canada.

== Distribution ==
The distribution range of Ectobius lapponicus includes Europe, Northern Asia (excluding China), the northeastern United States, and southeastern Canada. Once thought to have emerged in Europe, recent discoveries indicate the genus originated in North America. The first recorded sightings in North America were in 1984.

== Gallery ==
Ectobius lapponicus

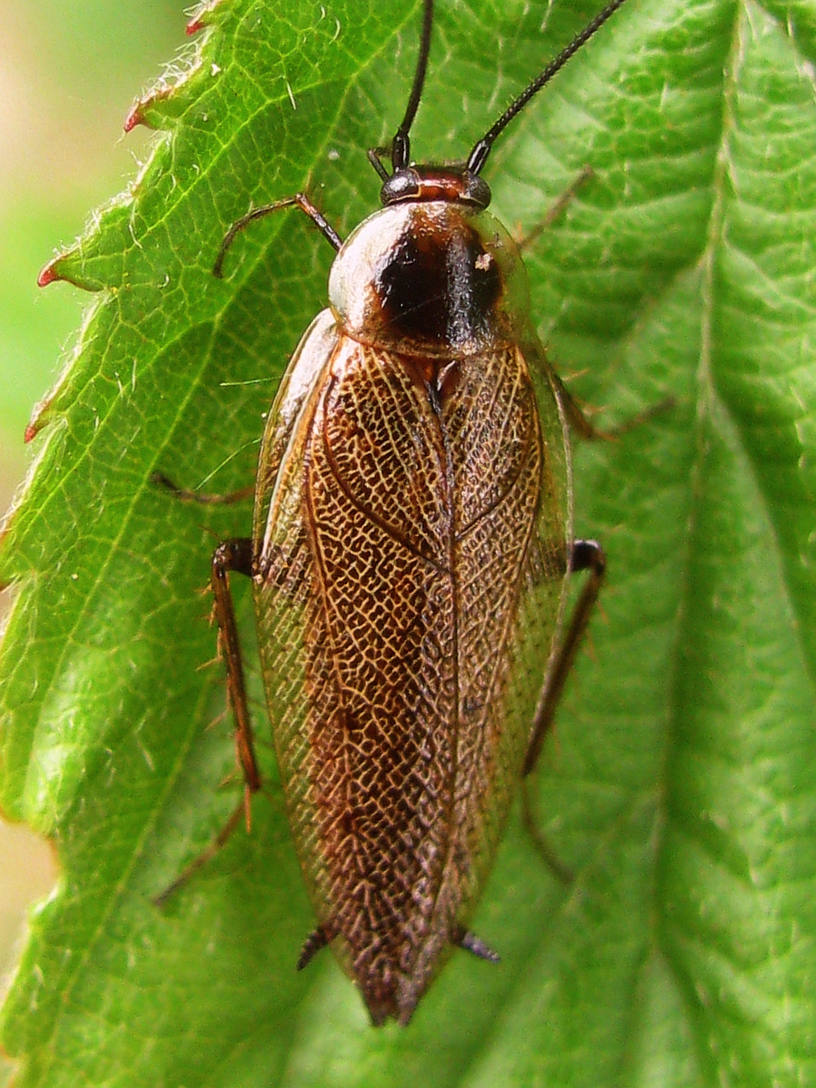
Ectobius lapponicus

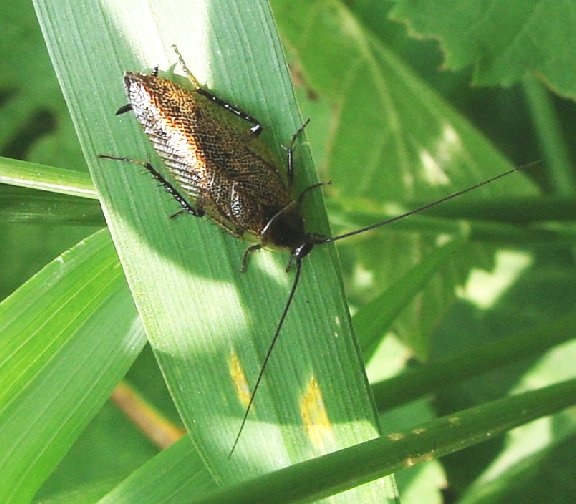
Ectobius lapponicus
