= Sheephouse Wood =

Protected area in Buckinghamshire, England

Coordinates: 51.9056°N 0.9795°W

- Site of Special Scientific Interest
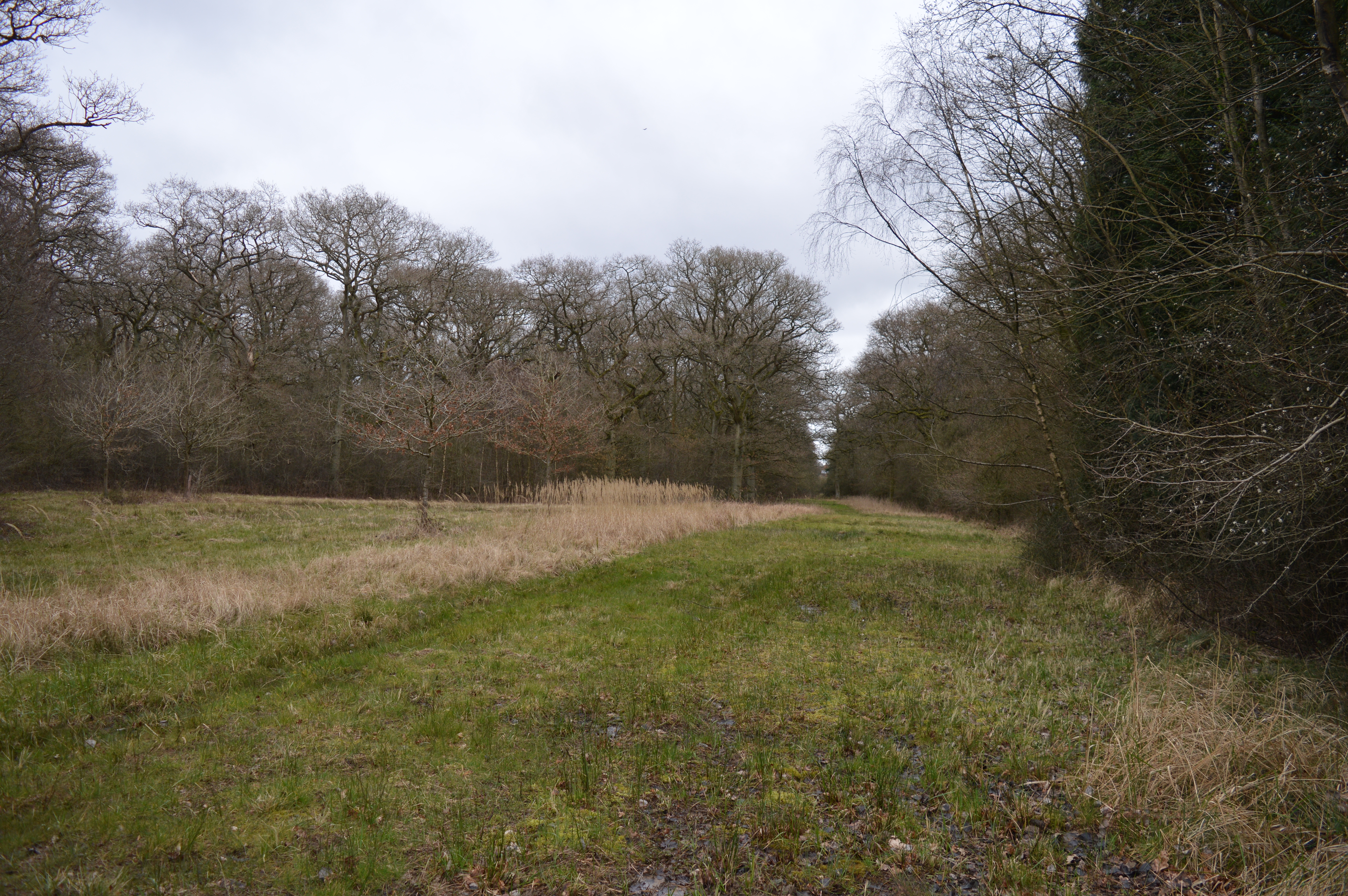
- Location of Sheephouse Wood.
- Area of search: Buckinghamshire
- Grid reference: SP703235
- Interest: Biological
- Area: 56.9 ha (141 acres)
- Notification date: 1986
- Location map: Magic Map

Sheephouse Wood is a 56.9-hectare (141-acre) biological Site of Special Scientific Interest east of Charndon in Buckinghamshire.

The site has ancient pedunculate oak woodland with diverse ground flora, typical breeding birds and some uncommon invertebrates. It is located on very poorly drained Oxford clay in the Vale of Aylesbury, and there are many small streams. Much of the woods have been woodland has been coppiced. Wet areas have maple and ash. The ground flora is dominated by brambles and bluebells. Invertebrates include the rare black hairstreak butterfly and ground-hopper tetrix subulata.

There is access by footpaths from Calvert. Some areas have notices: "No public right of way: nature conservation area".

The former Great Central Main Line cuts through the southwestern edge of the wood. The alignment is still in use for freight. 1.4 hectares of woodland at the southwestern edge of the site will be lost with the construction of High Speed 2, which will pass adjacent to the existing railway.

== Bat protection structure ==
The new railway line will be covered by a structure in order to protect bats from passing trains, commonly named the "bat tunnel". In November 2024, the cost of the structure, a series of 10-metre (33 ft) arches with sections of steel mesh for ventilation, was reported as £100 million.

The major species that the structure aims to protect is the rare Bechstein's bat. A colony in the forest is the most northerly discovered group in the United Kingdom.
