= Portland Group (geology) =

- Stratigraphic range: Tithonian
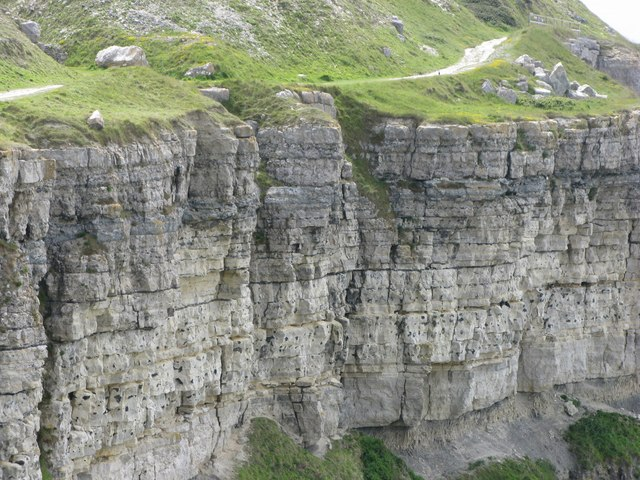
- Cliffs of the Portland Stone Formation on the western side of Portland Bill
- Type: Group
- Sub-units: Portland Stone Formation, Portland Sand Formation
- Underlies: Purbeck Group
- Overlies: Kimmeridge Clay Formation
- Thickness: up to 75 metres (250 ft)

Lithology
- Primary: Limestone, sandstone
- Other: Mudstone, micrite

Location
- Region: England
- Country: United Kingdom
- Extent: Dorset

Type section
- Named for: Isle of Portland

The Portland Group (defining the Portlandian) is a Late Jurassic (Tithonian) lithostratigraphic group (a sequence of rock strata) in South East England. The name is derived from the Isle of Portland in Dorset where the strata are exposed and have been extensively worked. Rocks of this age have in the past been called the Portlandian stage by geologists, which corresponds with the late Tithonian stage of the internationally used geological timescale.

== Outcrops ==
The Portland Group crops out in Dorset on the Isle of Portland, on and near the south coast of the Isle of Purbeck and to the north of Weymouth.

== Lithology and stratigraphy ==
The rocks include limestones, dolomitic sandstone, siltstone, and mudstone.

It is divided into two formations, the Portland Stone Formation (or 'Portland Limestone Formation') and the underlying Portland Sandstone Formation (or 'Portland Sand Formation'). The Portland Stone Formation is further divided into a lower Portland Chert Member and an upper Portland Freestone Member, both of which are limestones. The Portland Sand Formation is made up largely of dolomites but includes siltstones and fine-grained sandstones in its lower parts.

== Use in construction ==
The Portland Freestone is a 5 to 15 metres (16 to 49 ft) thick member of the Portland Stone Formation and is quarried on the Isle of Portland.
