= Princes Risborough =

Market town in Buckinghamshire, England

Coordinates: 51.723978°N 0.834418°W

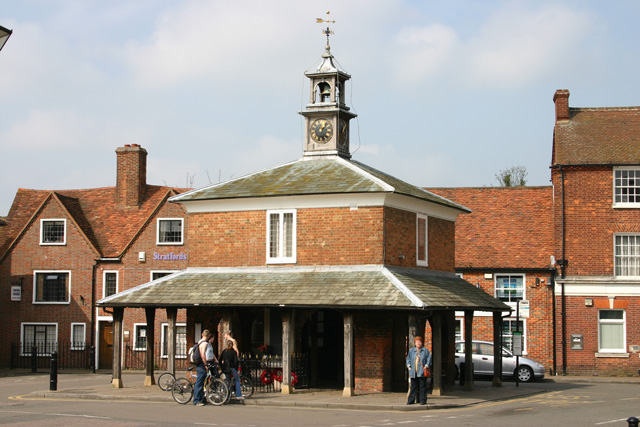
- Princes Risborough Market House

- Location within Buckinghamshire
- Population: 7,978; 8,101 (2011 Census)
- OS grid reference: SP798030
- Unitary authority: Buckinghamshire
- Ceremonial county: Buckinghamshire
- Region: South East
- Country: England
- Sovereign state: United Kingdom
- Post town: PRINCES RISBOROUGH
- Postcode district: HP27
- Dialling code: 01844
- Police: Thames Valley
- Fire: Buckinghamshire
- Ambulance: South Central
- UK Parliament: Mid Buckinghamshire

Princes Risborough (/ˈrɪzbərə/) is a market town and civil parish in Buckinghamshire, England; it is located about 8 miles (13 km) south of Aylesbury, 9 miles (14 km) northwest of High Wycombe, and 7 miles (11 km) south of Thame. It lies at the foot of the Chiltern Hills, at the north end of a gap or pass through the Chilterns; the south end of which is at West Wycombe. The A4010 road follows this route from West Wycombe through the town and then on to Aylesbury.

Historically, it was both a manor and an ecclesiastical parish, of the same extent as the manor, which comprised the present ecclesiastical parish of Princes Risborough (excluding Ilmer) and also the present ecclesiastical parish of Lacey Green, which became a separate parish in the 19th century. It was long and narrow (a "strip parish"), taking in land below the Chiltern scarp, the slope of the scarp itself and also land above the scarp extending into the Chiltern hills. The manor and the parish extended from Longwick in the north through Alscot, the town of Princes Risborough, Loosley Row and Lacey Green to Speen and Walters Ash in the south.

Since 1934, the civil parish of Princes Risborough (formerly the same as the ecclesiastical parish) has included the town of Princes Risborough, the village of Monks Risborough (but not the outlying parts) and part of Horsenden but has excluded Longwick. It is within the Wycombe district of Buckinghamshire and operates as a town council within Wycombe district.

The town is overlooked by the Whiteleaf Cross, a chalk cross carved into the hillside that's just northeast of the town. Though the cross itself lies just above the village with the same name, the landmark is located within the area of Monks Risborough.

== Toponym ==
The name 'Risborough' comes from the Old English hrisen beorgas meaning 'brushwood-covered hills'. Hrisen, an adjective meaning brushwood-covered derived from hris meaning brushwood or scrub, and beorgas which meant hills. The spelling varies in the documents in which the name is found.

In the 13th century, it was known as Magna Risberge (Great Risborough) which distinguished it from Parva Risberge (Little Risborough), which is now Monks Risborough. Later it was Earls Risborough because the manor was held by the Earls of Cornwall between 1242 and 1336. At some point, following the death of Edward the Black Prince, it became Prince Risberge and later Princes Risborough, as the manor belonged to various Princes during the Wars of the Roses during the 15th century.

== Risborough 1066–1086 ==
Great Risborough, as it was then known, had been a Saxon village held by Edward the Confessor. As a royal manor it could be used by the King to make financial provision for members of the royal family or others whom the King at any point might wish to reward. The current land where the royal manor once stood (now a car park known as The Mount) bears traces of banks and entrenchments, enclosed by a moat and is originally believed to have been a Saxon encampment. The land was then held shortly by Harold Godwinson before he was defeated at the Battle of Hastings.

Before 1066, the land of the manor and village only paid £10 at face value (i.e. without weighing the coins). Furthermore, a burgess of Oxford paid 2s and a saltboiler of Droitwich an amount left blank. A freeman held three virgates and had the right to sell his land, though it was said that he served the sheriff. At the time of the Domesday Book survey in 1086, the Manor of Risborough was an extensive complex of a royal manor, stud farm, deer park and a large fishery. There most likely was an earlier church on the current site of St Mary's Church today. It was part of the Hundred of Risborough, which also comprised Bledlow, Horsenden and Monks Risborough.

In 1086, the land was assessed at 30 hides both before and after the conquest, of which 20 hides related to the demesne. The manor had land for 24 ploughs, four of them in the lord's demesne. There were 30 villagers and they together with 12 bordars (cottagers or small holders) had 20 ploughs. There were three slaves. There were two mills, worth 14s 8d a year, meadow for seven ploughteams (generally taken as needing eight oxen each) and woodland sufficient for 1,000 pigs. In total, it paid £47 a year in white silver, less 16d.

== Risborough as a Royal Manor ==
After the Norman Conquest, the local woods on the land of the Manor were privatized under the forest law and formed part of the lands of the new King, William the Conqueror who granted Risborough's royal manor as one of 48 Buckinghamshire manors to the feudal barony of Long Crendon held by Walter Giffard, Lord of Longueville for his many years of loyal service. In 1085, lordship of the manor of Risborough passed to his son Walter Giffard, 1st Earl of Buckingham. By the 12th century, it was still held by the Giffard family, namely Walter Giffard, 2nd Earl of Buckingham, when he died without issue in 1164 it reverted to the Crown.

It was then granted to the Constable of Normandy, Robert de Humeto, who obtained a charter from King Henry II, and remained in his family until about 1242. King Henry III then granted the manor to his brother Richard, Earl of Cornwall, it was then meant to pass to Richard's eldest son Henry of Almain but when he was murdered before his father died, Richard ordered his estates be passed to his second son, Edmund, 2nd Earl of Cornwall. When Edmund died childless in 1300, his estates including the royal manor of what was now called Earls Risborough were escheated to the Crown.

Between 1302 and 1305, King Edward I granted it to Queen Margaret for her life, subject to the rights of Edmund's widow Margaret, Countess of Cornwall, in one third part for life as part of her dower. King Edward II gave the reversion (subject to these life interests) to his unpopular favourite, Piers Gaveston and his wife, but this grant was surrendered in the same year. Queen Margaret died in 1318. In 1327, when Edward III succeeded to the throne at the age of fifteen, he granted the manor to his mother, Queen Isabella for her services during his father's reign. The King's brother, John of Eltham, Earl of Cornwall, also had an interest for a time.

The King then granted the manor to his eldest son, Edward Prince of Wales, known later (though not during his lifetime) as the Black Prince. He held the manor for 32 years from 1344 to 1376 when he died.

On the death of the Black Prince, the manor passed to his son, Richard of Bordeaux, who became King Richard II in the following year. He granted it to Lewis de Clifford who held it for his life. When it reverted to King Henry IV, the manor passed through the royal family for many years who granted it to his son Henry, Prince of Wales, who became King Henry V in 1413. It then passed to Henry VI and was part of the dower of his Queen, Margaret of Anjou. Later, it was held by his son, Edward, and then appears to have remained vested in the Crown until Edward VI granted it to his half-sister, the Princess (later Queen) Elizabeth for her life.

Subsequently, James I held it and it formed part of the dower of his Queen, Anne of Denmark. Later again it was held by Prince Charles, later King Charles I, who in 1628 sold it to the City of London in part satisfaction of the large debts of the Crown. Thus, after more than 600 years, the manor's long connection with the Crown of England finally came to an end. Subsequently, the manor was bought and sold in the market and changed hands from time to time, but its later manorial history is only a record of commercial transactions.

== Risborough under the Black Prince ==
King Edward III granted the Manor of Risborough in 1344 to his eldest son, Edward Prince of Wales, known posthumously as the Black Prince. He was 14 years of age and he held the manor for 32 years until his death in 1376. Edward III did not die until 1377 and the Prince never became king. It was after the Black Prince's death that the market town became known as Prince Risberge later Princes Risborough.

At the time when the Prince became lord of the manor of Risborough, there was a manor house and hall on the west side of the church (where there is now a car park), which old sources describe as his "palace". To some extent, the manor was laid out on much the same lines as other manor houses (also called "palaces" at the time) like Much Hadham Palace in Hertfordshire and Woking Palace in Surrey and possibly the manor at Watlington which also belonged to the Black Prince. The manor house and grounds may have been extensive but it was hardly palatial and might be better described as a hunting lodge. The Prince seems never to have spent an extended period of time there. The nearest place where he lived for any length of time was Berkhamsted Castle, where he stayed after his marriage to Joan Countess of Kent from November 1361 to January 1362 and occasionally at other times.

By the 14th century, the Manor was known for its Royal stud for breeding horses and hunting. The main purpose of the Prince's visits to Risborough is likely to have been to visit the stud and inspect and/or select stallions with such resounding names as Grisel, Tankarvill, Morel de Salesbirs.

Much of his adult life was spent on campaign in France, where he won the great victory of Poitiers in 1356. In July 1362, his father (Edward III) made him Prince of Aquitaine and he remained in that province until he returned to England in 1371, probably already a sick man. In 1346, when the Prince (aged 16) was about to leave with his father for his first campaign in France, which culminated in the battle of Crecy, a Council was set up to manage on his behalf his various manors and lordships throughout the country. The transactions of this council were recorded and have been printed and published by the Public Record Office. Many decisions affecting Risborough were made by this Council rather than by the Prince himself. They give us some insight into life at Risborough in the 14th century.

The manor was in the charge of a steward (not always resident there), but its day-to-day management was in the hands of the reeve, and there was a parker, responsible for the management of the park, and a keeper of the stud.

In November 1346, John de Alveton was appointed to be steward of the Prince's manors of Watlington and Risborough. In 1347 the keeper of the stud was Richard de Bekenesfield and he was ordered to render tithes due to the Abbot of Notley if there were sufficient foals of the year for the purpose. In the same year the Reeve had been ordered to pay money out of the profits of Risborough to make a new kitchen at the Prince's manor of Byfleet. In 1354, in which year the Prince was at Berkhamsted, a piece of land in the Park was enclosed by the Prince and the Reeve (William Onyot) paid 18 shillings for it. The Prince may well have been there in person that year for the Treasurer of his household was ordered "by command of the Prince himself" to make payment for various things taken for the Prince's use and expended in the Prince's household at Risborough "after verifying that the same are really due". These included a total of 186 gallons of ale and "to John Dayly of Risborough 17 pence for underwood and fuel for the fire".

In 1359, Sir Peter de Lacey the Prince's clerk and receiver-general was ordered to provide hay, oats, shoes and litter until further order for two destriers (warhorses) which Sir Baldwin Bottecourt had lent to the Prince to be stallions at Risborough and Cippenham and to pay 3d a day to a groom that keeps them.

There seems to have been a great storm in 1362, when the Reeve was to allow the Parker to sell all the wood which had fallen in the Park except the great ash, if its value did not exceed £4.

In April 1364, the Reeve had to make provision for a grey courser which was sent to cover the mares at Risborough and in July to pay £10.10s for a black stallion for the same purpose. Also in 1364, the Reeve was to cause the garret over the gate of the Prince's Park to be demolished and pulled down, as it was reported very weak and ruinous, and to use the timber and other materials to build a lodge near the gate. He was also to flush out the ditches round the manor and to sell as dearly as possible all the large fish caught there, keeping the small fish as stock.

The Prince died at Westminster on 8 June 1376 aged 46.

== Churches ==
=== St Mary's church ===
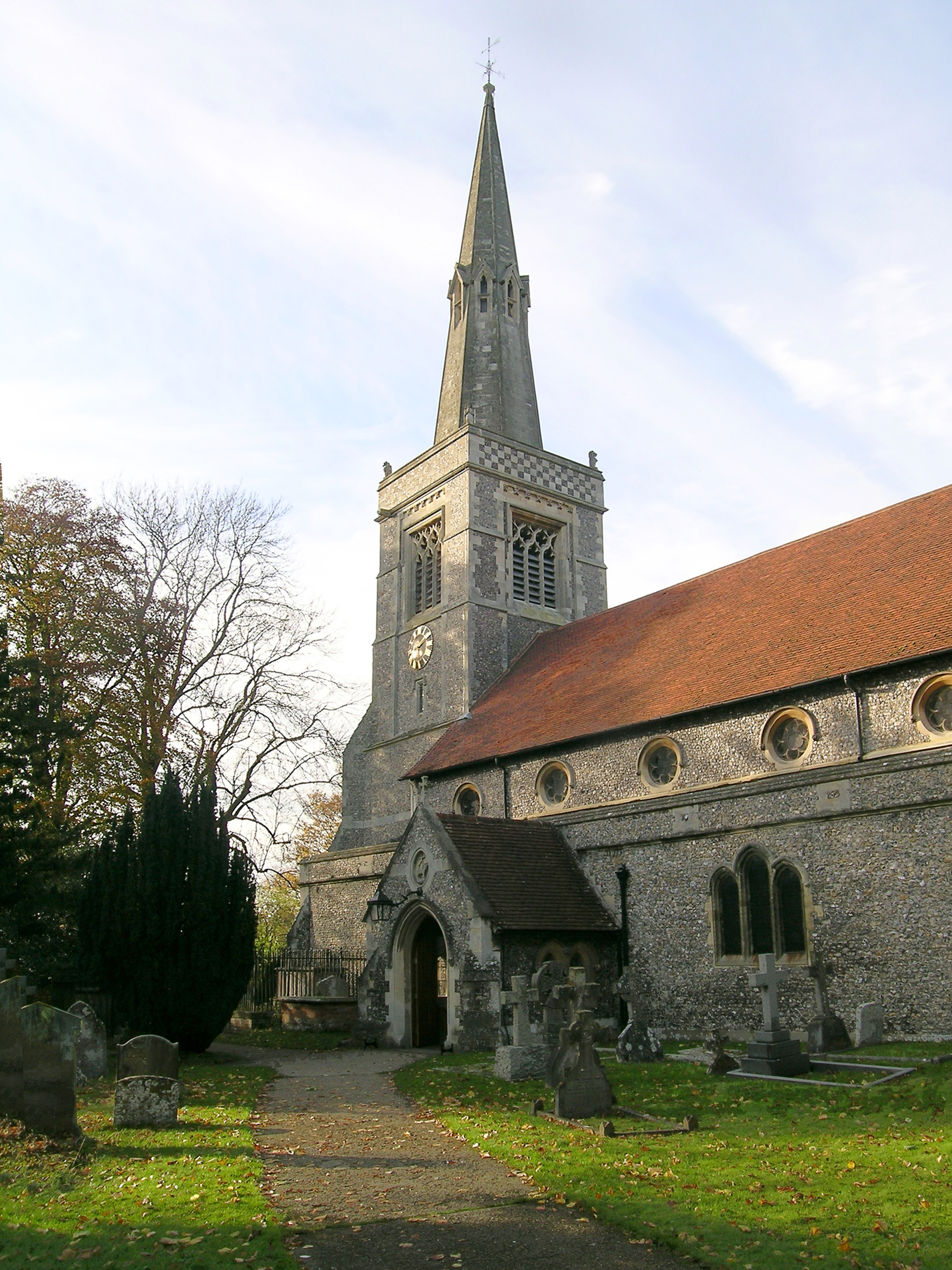
St Mary's Church from the south-east

The church in its present general form dates from the 13th century. There was an earlier small church, probably just a small chancel and a nave without aisles, which would have been in roughly the same position as the present nave. The church was enlarged and improved from the 13th to the 15th centuries as described below. By the 19th century, it was in bad condition and was extensively restored and partly rebuilt in 1867–68. The tower and spire were rebuilt in 1907–08 and parish rooms were added in the 21st century.

==== Nave and chancel ====
The church was enlarged by the addition of the nave arcades and aisles in the early or mid-13th century The arches at the western end of each arcade were added in the late 13th or early 14th century, those on the south being later. The columns are octagonal with plain chamfered bases and moulded capitals. There were originally deep solid responds at the eastern end of each arcade (altered to make a narrower additional arch in the 19th century). There are now seven arches on each side.

The chancel was rebuilt about 1290 and the two-light window in the north wall is of that date (much restored) with a modern quatrefoil above. The two windows in the south wall of the chancel are probably of about 1340. The east window is modern.

In the south aisle, the window at the east end is of about 1300. The easternmost window in the south wall is "a fine triplet of lancets", "a very remarkable window" and has attached and detached shafts of Purbeck marble making an open arcade of three bays. This is dated to the early 13th century. The other window in this aisle (on the western side of the door) is of about 1340.

Below the windows in the south aisle are four 14th-century recesses with ogee heads which once probably held tombs.

At the end of the south wall of the south aisle, next to the altar, are a piscina (a shelf on which the sacred vessels were washed after Mass) and a sedile (a stone seat for the priest), both in the decorated gothic style of the 14th century but badly damaged. These were always found on the right side of an altar and show that there was an altar at the end of this aisle in the Middle Ages. This piscina has no drain but there is a stone shelf above it.

In the north aisle are four modern windows from the 19th-century rebuilding of this wall, using some old materials. The 14th-century door on the north side was formerly blocked, but now serves as the entrance to the new parish rooms which were built at the start of the 21st century on the north side of the church.

==== Tower and spire ====
The church originally had a tower with a spire above it, probably built in the 15th century, but this spire fell down in 1803, damaging the church and destroying a peal of bells. A new stone spire was built, octagonal in shape, and described in 1862 as covered with galvanised iron. In 1907–08 a new tower and spire were built from the foundations, designed by John Oldrid Scott.

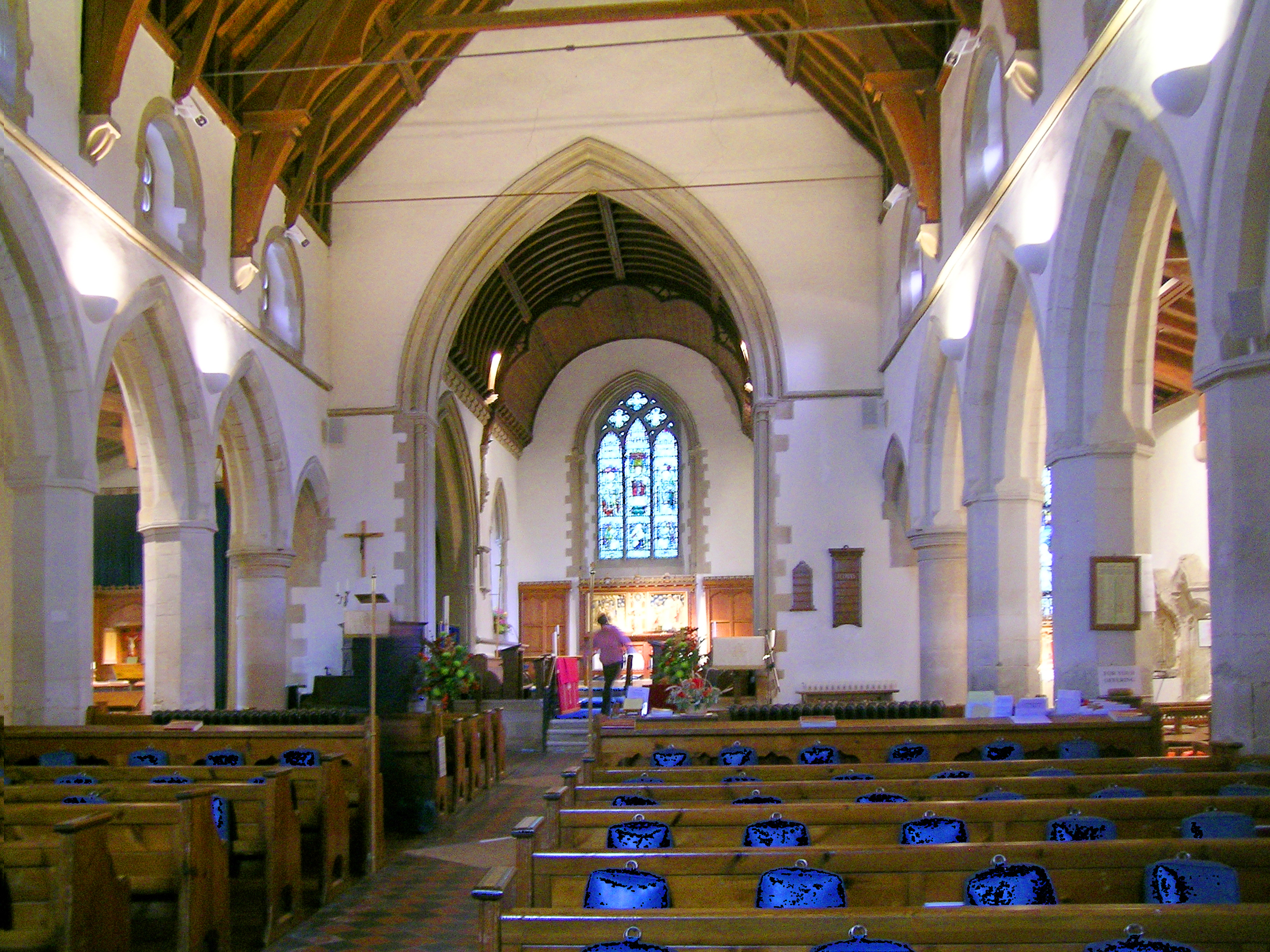
The interior of the church looking east

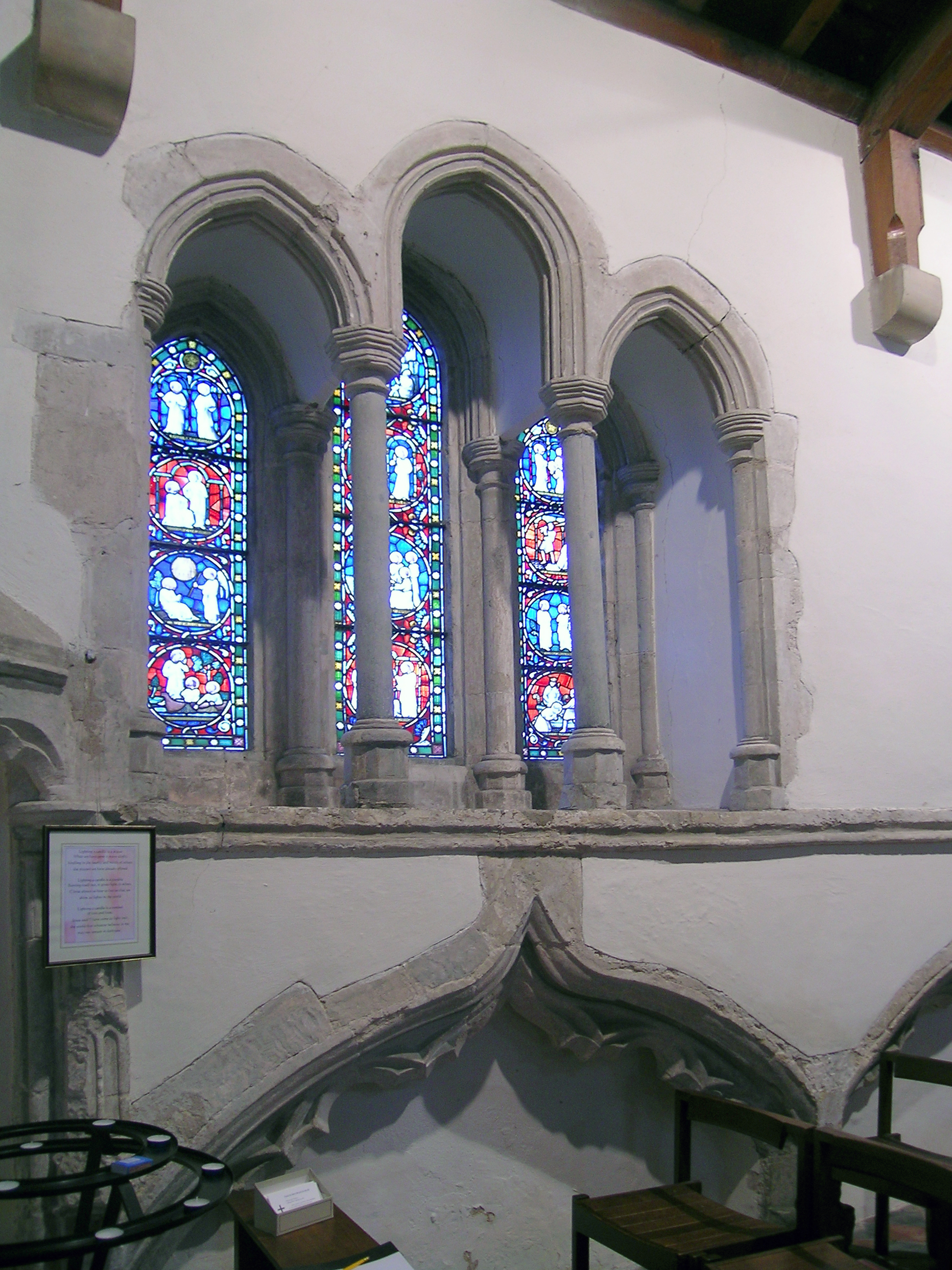
Three lancet window in the south aisle

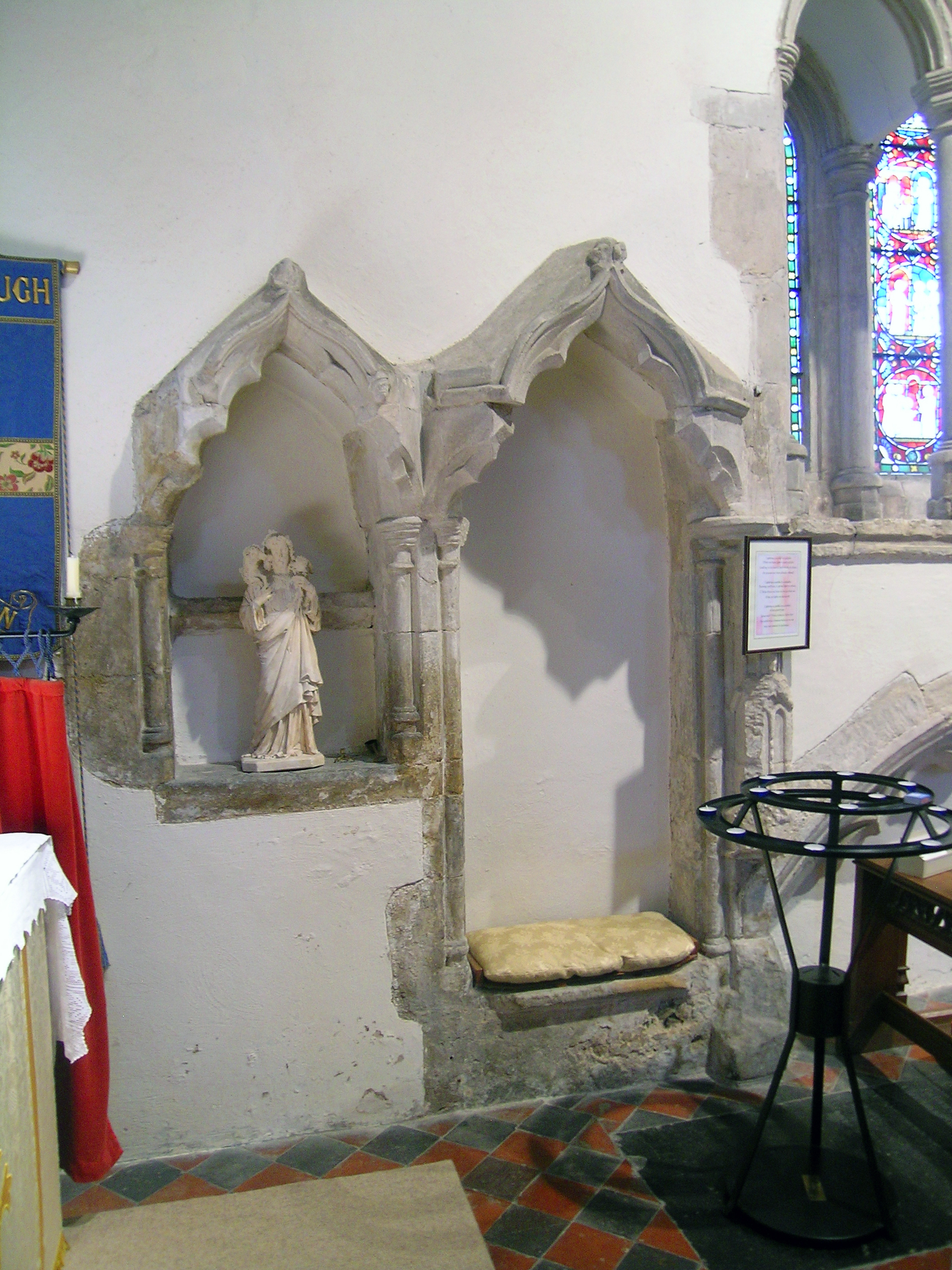
Piscina and sedile in south aisle

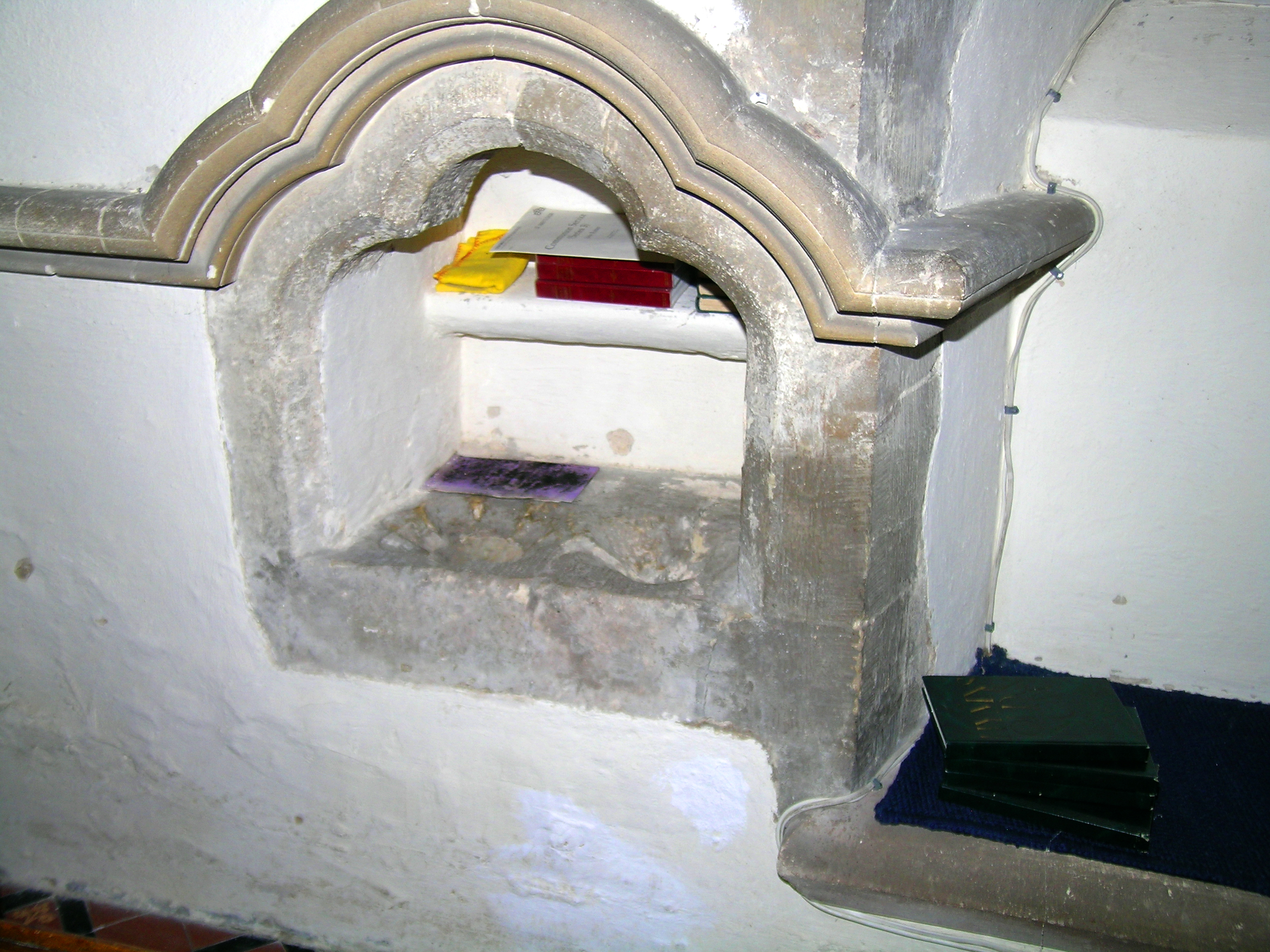
Piscina in south wall of chancel

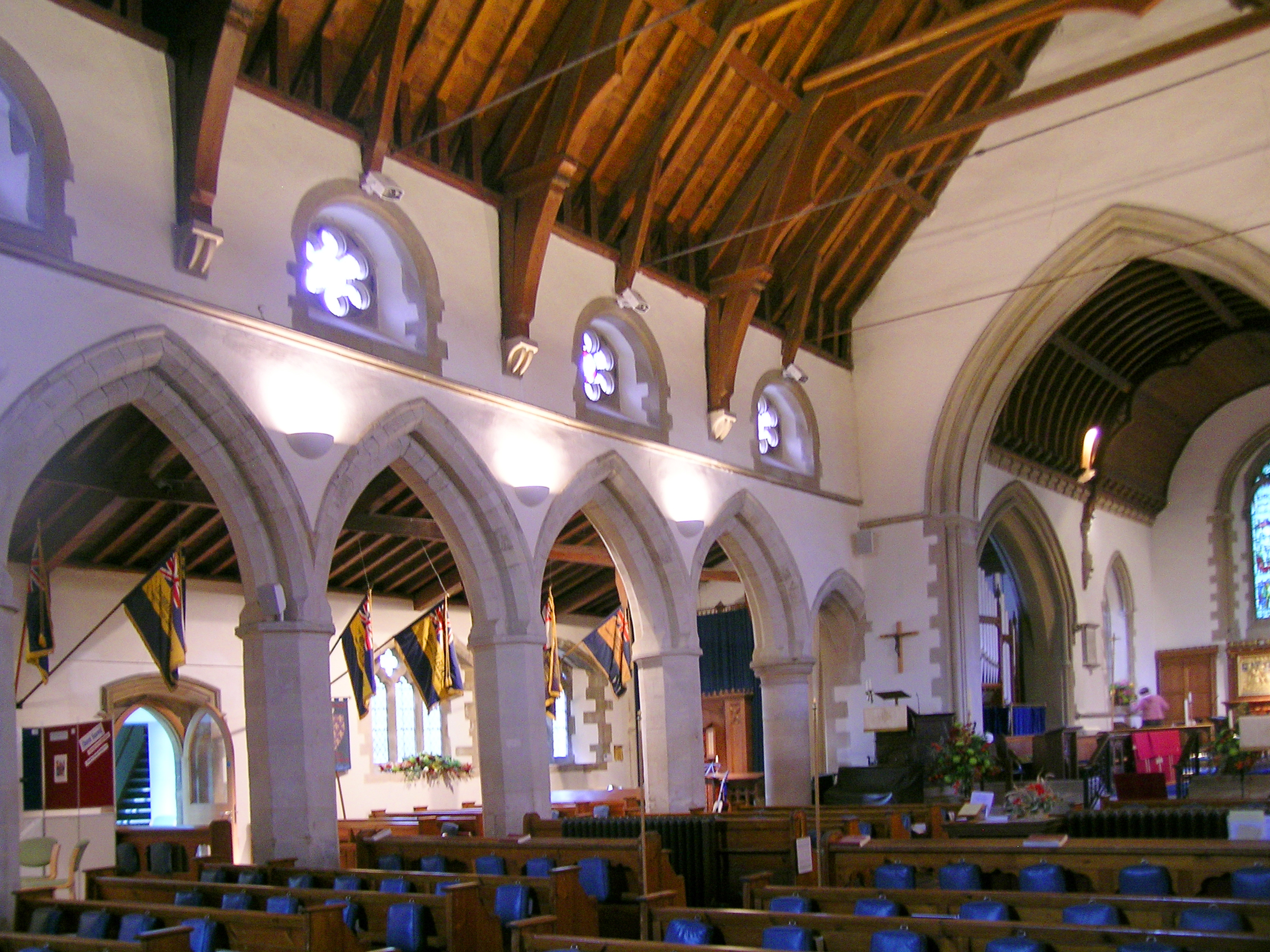
North aisle

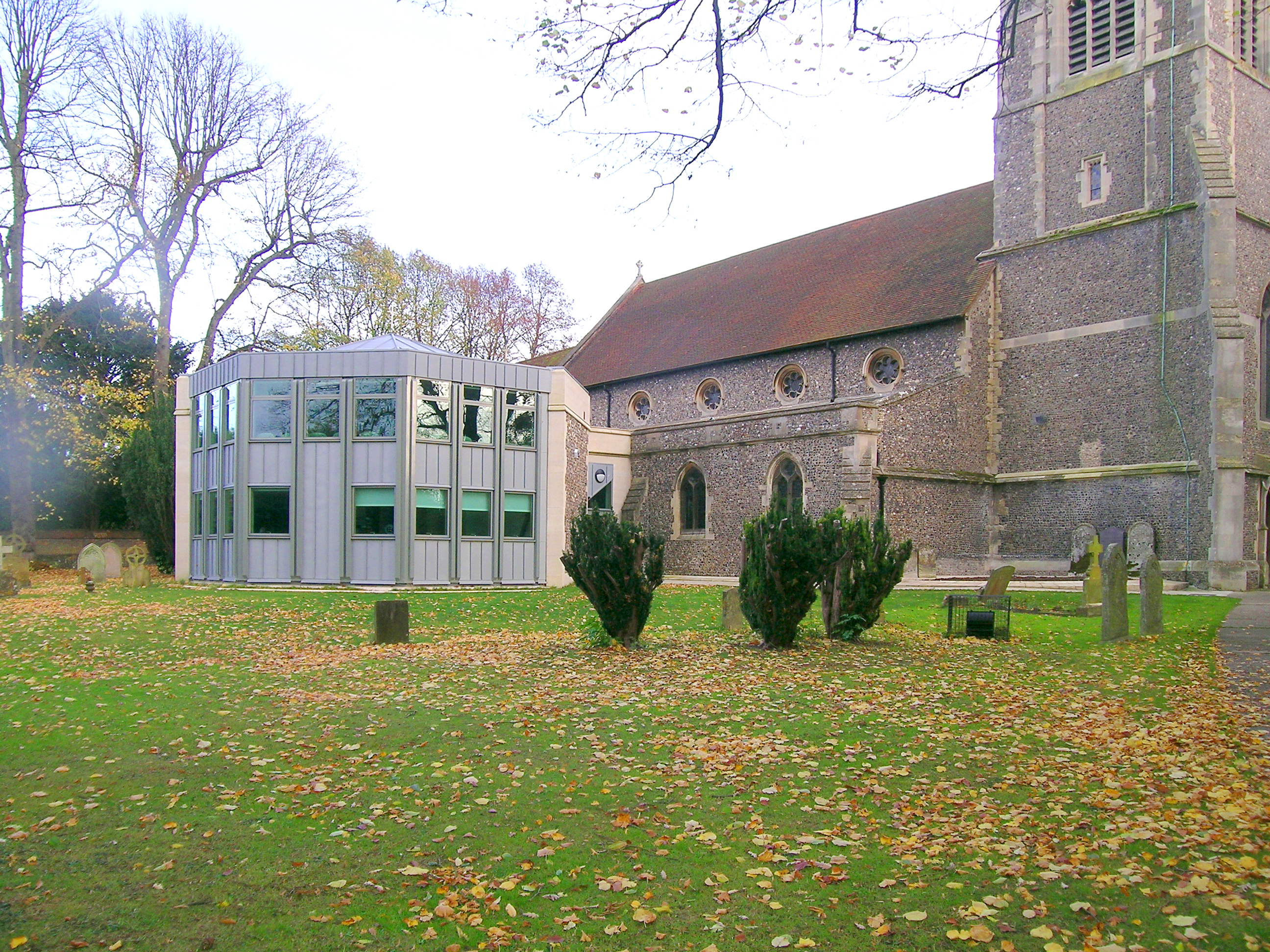
The church from the north west, showing parish rooms

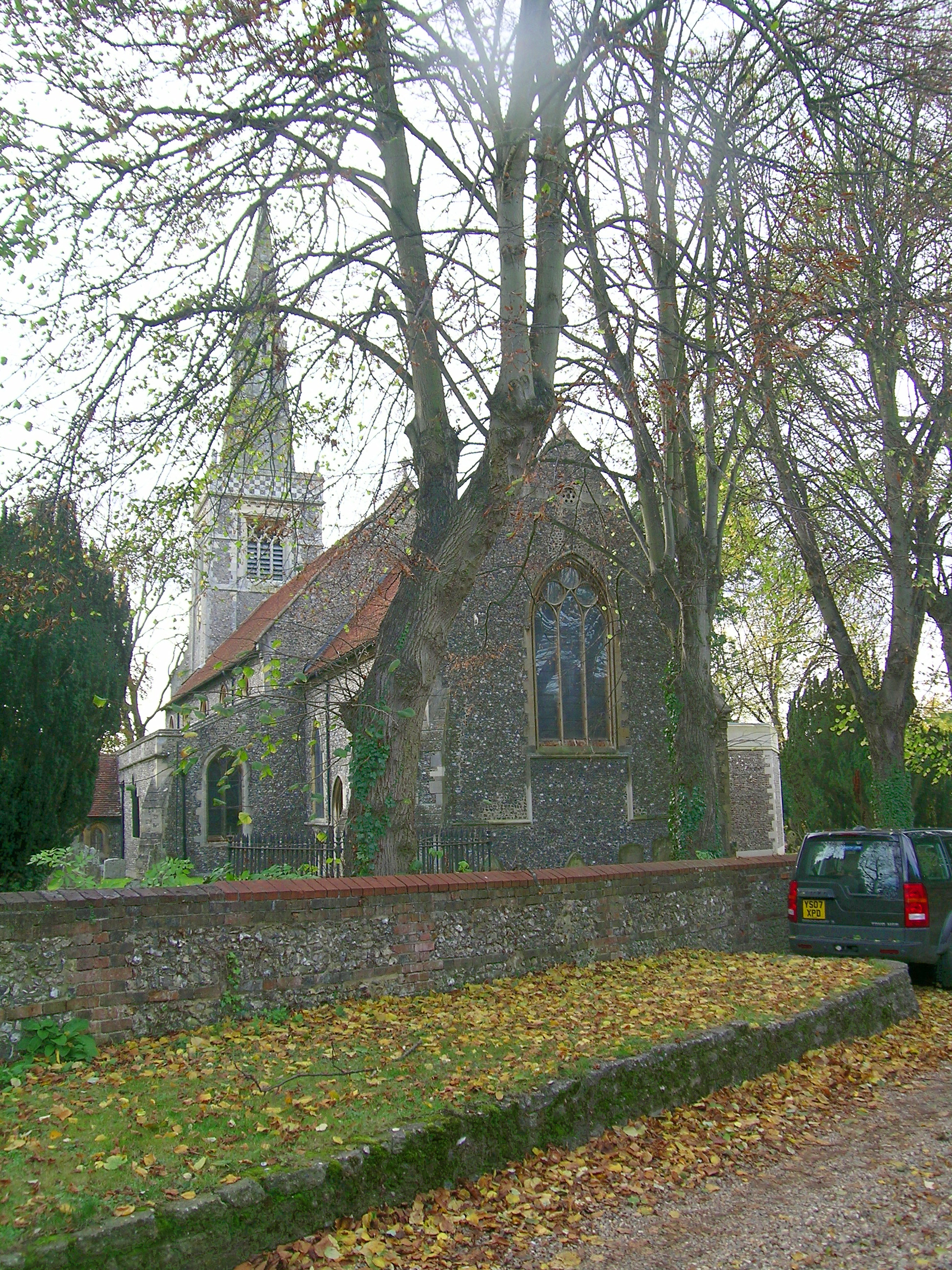
The church seen from the east

In 1765, the Earl of Buckingham gave the rectory of Princes Risborough to the manor at Nutley Abbey in Long Crendon, to which it is still attached today.

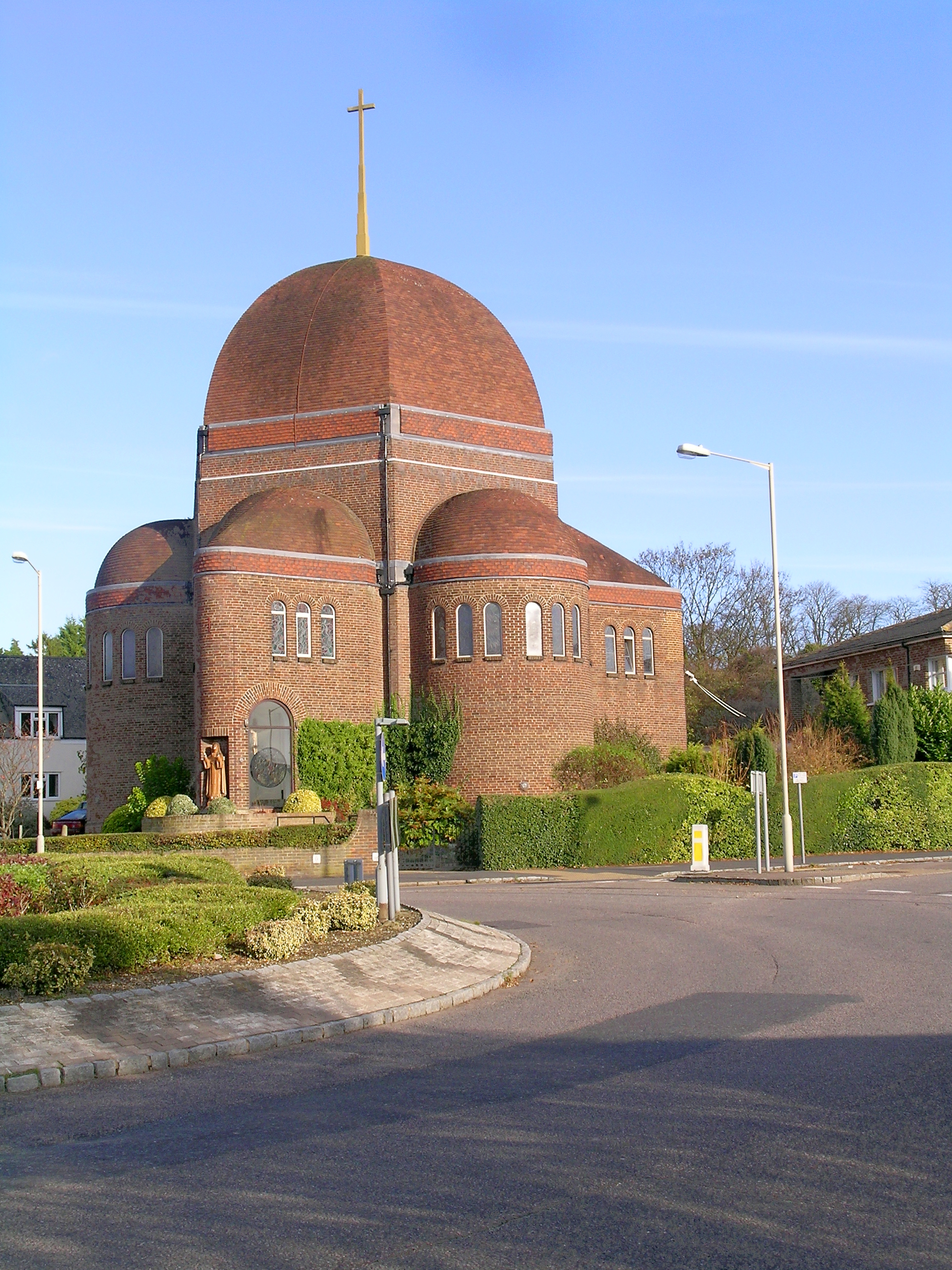
The Roman Catholic Church of St Teresa of the Child Jesus

=== St Teresa's church ===
This domed church, on the corner of the Aylesbury Road and New Road, was designed by Giuseppe Rinvolucri and built in 1937–38. Pevsner & Williamson explain that in plan it is a triangle interpenetrating a hexagon, with an apse in the middle of each side of the triangle.

Inside the church, there are two painted ceramic statues, of St Teresa of Lisieux and St Joseph, by Richard Guino. The altar relief is also by him. The Stations of the Cross are timber reliefs (1990–1) by Stephen Foster, which Pevsner & Williamson considered of high quality. An altar rail (1957) by Rosamund Fletcher now serves as a screen to St Teresa's chapel.

=== Baptist church ===
The Baptist church, off Bell Street, with its own burial ground, dates from 1804 to 1805. It is built of flint with brick dressings with arched windows and has a hipped slated roof. The interior has galleries on three sides with the original baptistery under one of them.

The history of the Baptists in Princes Risborough began about 1701, when some members of the General Baptist church at Ford (later moved to Cuddington) seceded for doctrinal reasons and established a Particular Baptist meeting there. A meeting house was erected in 1707. (The Particular or Peculiar Baptists were closer to Calvinism than the General Baptists) After the present building had been erected in 1804–5, it was extended and re-arranged in 1814. The galleries were enlarged in 1833 and a vestry was added in 1871.

In the mid-20th century, two sides were rendered with pebble-dash and a new entrance and porch were added in the front. Extensive additions with additional rooms have been made later, adjoining the original building.

== Manor House ==
=== Medieval ===
In medieval times, from the 13th to the 15th centuries, Manor House was a building on the south western side of the church surrounded by an earthen rampart and a moat, most of the site being now occupied by the Mount car park (the area was formerly known as the Mount). Only the base of some of the walls remained from the old building and these were partially excavated in 1955 before the car park was constructed. The remains of the building lie under the far side of the car park (farthest from the church) extending from north west to south east, parallel with the fence at the end. The whole building was about 150 feet (46 m) long with a minimum width of 15 feet (4.6 m). Most of the remains had been pillaged for building material over the centuries and there was only time for a partial excavation in 1955, with the result that the excavator could only reach provisional conclusions about the nature of the building and the uses of the rooms.

Most of the remaining walls were 1 foot (30 cm) high or less and of dry-set flint and chalk. They were only 1 foot to 1 foot 6 inches (30 to 46 cm) in width (with offsets) in shallow foundation trenches. The excavator thought that the upper part of the walls were probably made of wychert, a local building material still existing in some buildings particularly at Haddenham and consisting of chalk mud mixed with straw which would set very solid. The roofs may have been partly thatched but part must have been tiled, because a fair number of roofing tiles were found spread over the site. Looking at the building from the church side, the excavator thought that on the left was probably a two-story building which would have been the accommodation reserved for the lord of the manor. The room on the first floor would have been the "great chamber" serving as bedroom and sitting room. The great hall probably extended in front of this part of the building towards the church, but this was not found or excavated. On the right of this room was probably the kitchen and beyond that more living accommodation, perhaps for the steward, with a smaller hall extending in front of it. This was roughly in the centre of the building. The excavator considered whether this might be the great hall but thought it probably too small. Beyond it to the right was a range of single storey rooms.

The remainder of the area could not be excavated, but trial holes indicated that most of it may have been paved with cobbles.

The only positive evidence of date was a somewhat worn penny of Edward I, struck at the Bristol mint in 1280–1, which might have been lost at any time up to about 1300. The majority of the pottery found was datable to the 14th century.

The indications were that the buildings were first erected in the 13th century, perhaps in the reign of Henry III (1207–72), that they were in use throughout the 14th century (Edward II, the Prince of Wales during the reign of Edward III and Richard II) but went out of use at the end of that century or in the early 15th century.

Another building may have been erected on some part of the site at a later date, because there are documentary references to such a building in the reign of Elizabeth I and its remains are said to have been demolished around 1800.

=== Modern ===
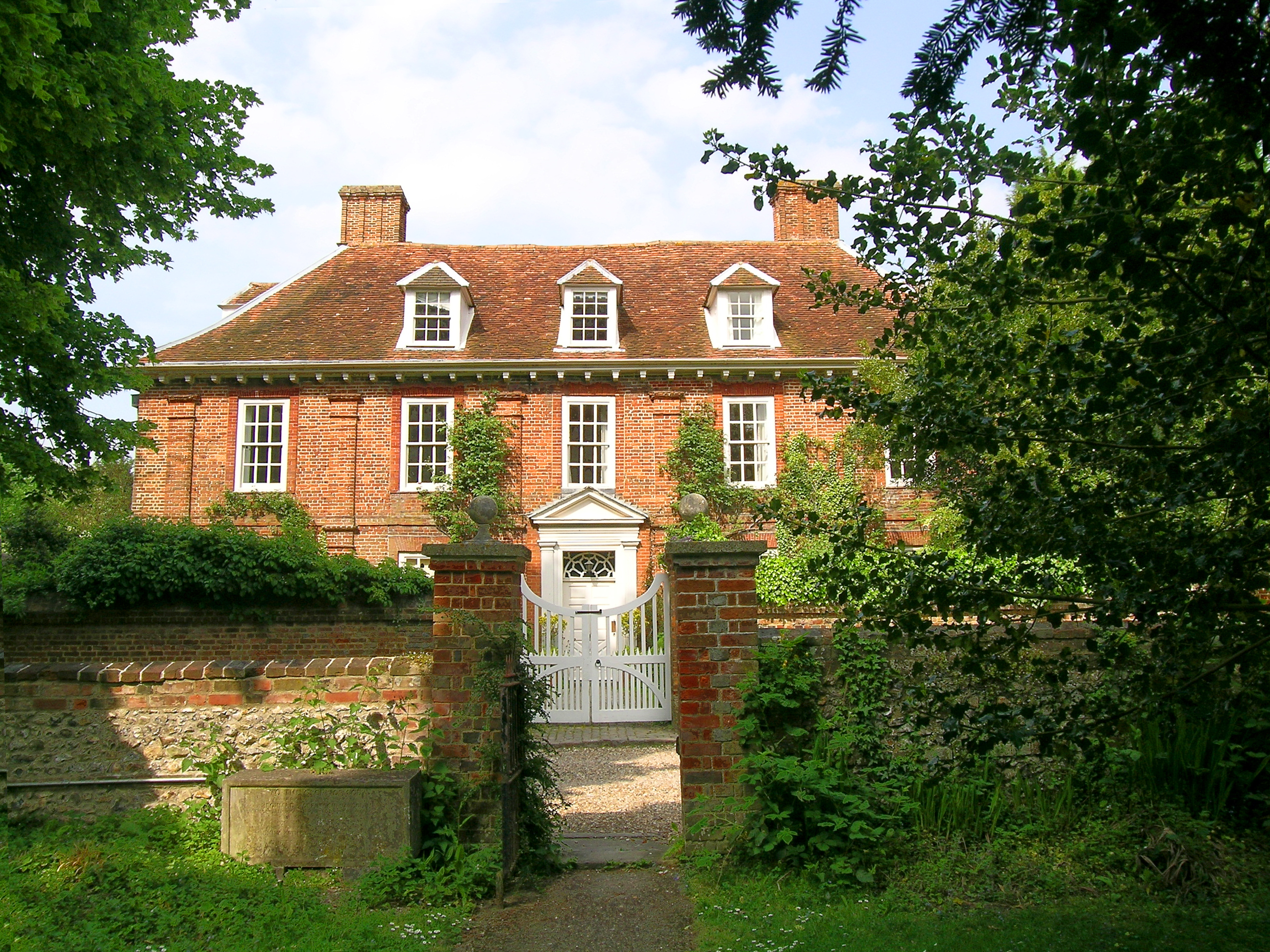
The Manor House (formerly Brook House) in 2010

The house now known as the Manor House stands opposite the east end of the church. It was formerly known as Brook or Brooke House and the name was only changed in the late 19th century.

The house is first mentioned (as Broke House) in the reign of Elizabeth I in a grant dated 1589, but this was an earlier building, though some parts of it are incorporated in the present house. Arthur Oswald thought that the interior wall parallel to the front outside wall and fireplaces in two of the bedrooms may come from the Elizabethan house. The house was substantially enlarged and rebuilt in the mid-17th century.

Inigo Jones had brought the classical Renaissance style to England in the early 17th century. His followers took the new classical style into the country, characterised by its symmetry and proportion and such classical elements as pilasters, while wide eaves took the place of a cornice. Often a bricklayer would also be the principal contractor, controlling the other trades, and he could avoid the necessity to employ a mason for stonework if he could produce the classical elements in brick. So in this house we have brick pilasters, one above the other, with capitals and bases shaped in brickwork. The rebuilding seems to have been carried out in two stages, though without a long gap between them. There is a straight joint in the brickwork to the left of the second pilaster on the north side. In front of this the bricks are laid in English bond, but Flemish bond is used towards the back, indicating that this part was built a little later.

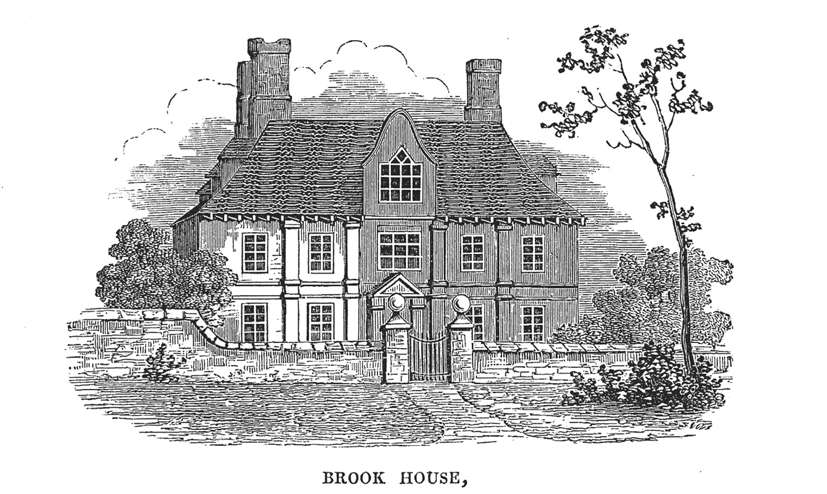
The Manor House (then Brook House) in the 1840s from Lipscomb's History of the County of Buckingham (1847)

The house is built of red brick with two storeys and an attic. The frontage has five windows, widely spaced and separated by brick pilasters in two orders corresponding to the ground and first floors. Originally there was a large central attic window of 'Dutch' type (as can be seen in the woodcut from Lipscomb's History of the County of Buckingham (1847)). This was replaced by three dormer windows in the late 19th century.

Inside the house, the staircase and some of the panelling and fireplaces in the hall and drawing room date from the 17th-century re-building. The oak staircase opens at the back of the hall through a 17th-century arch and ascends two storeys round a square well. Arthur Oswald describes it as of Jacobean type but likely to have been made by a country joiner at the time of the Commonwealth or Charles II. Pevsner & Williamson, who call it "spectacular", describe it as made in the mid-17th century but in the strapwork tradition.

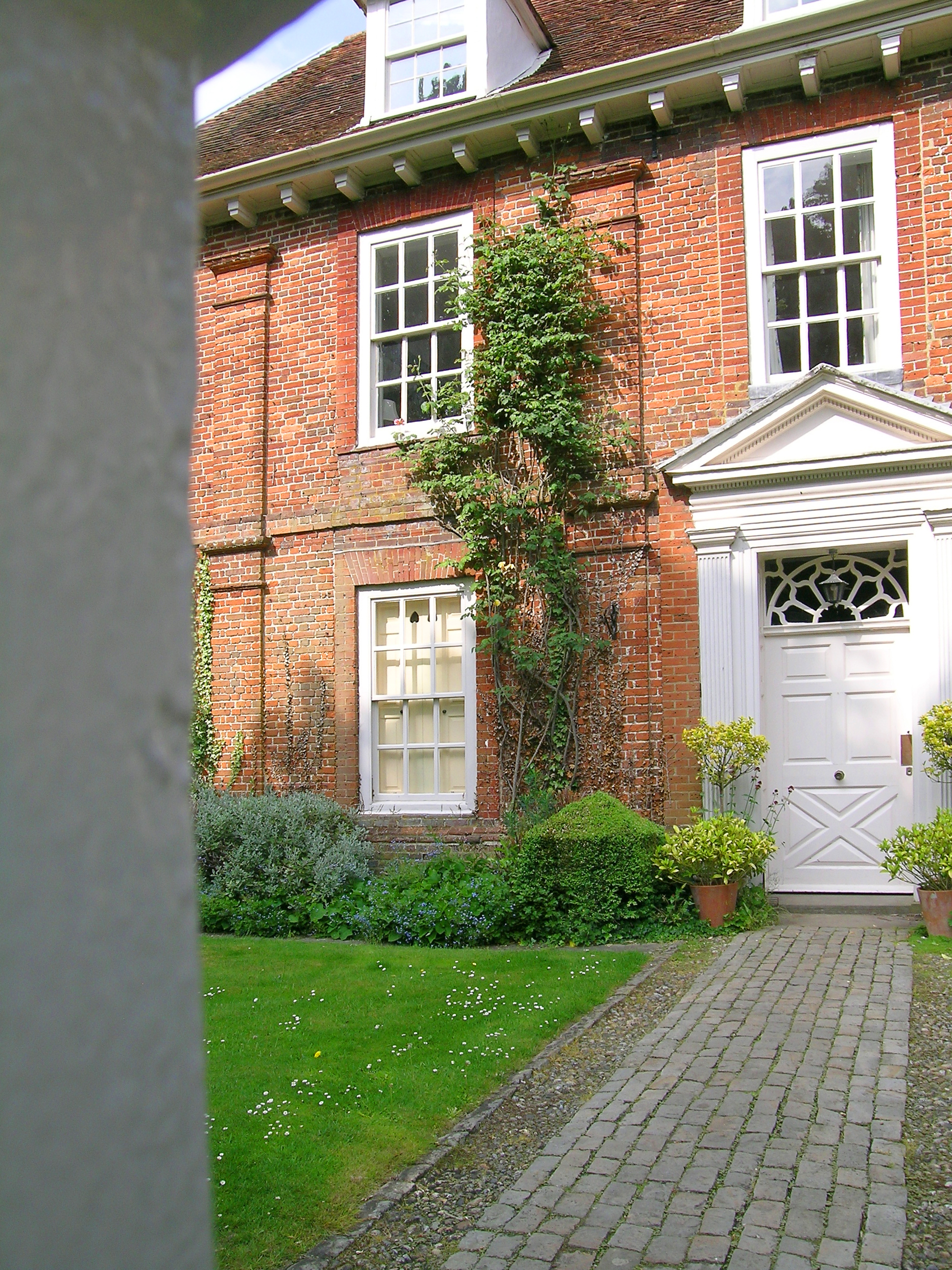
Detail showing the 17th-century brick pilasters and the (later) front door

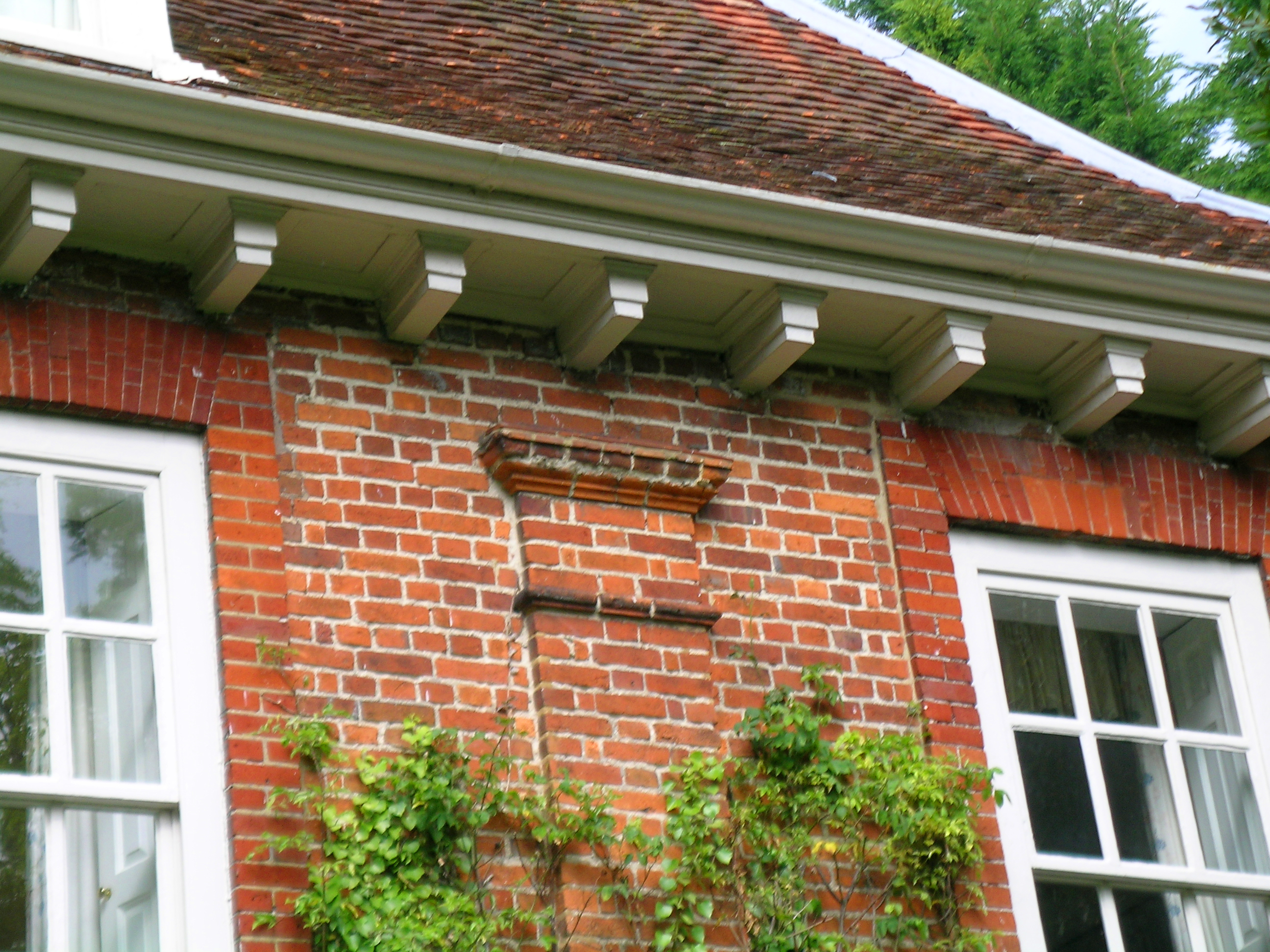
Detail of the capital of the pilaster (17th century brickwork)

Arthur Oswald thought that the entrance doorway and sash windows were probably 18th-century alterations made in Georgian times, but Pevsner and Williamson think they might be part of Lord Rothschild's alterations in 1886.

By the mid-19th century, the house was very dilapidated and part was being used for storing grain. Lord Rothschild bought it in the 1880s and arranged for it to be renovated and put into repair. This work started in 1886, but there is no record of exactly what was done. It was probably after the completion of this work that the name was changed to the Manor House. In 1926, later members of the Rothschild family gave the house to the National Trust and it was then further modernised under the direction of the Society for the Preservation of Ancient Buildings. It is usually let to a tenant and some rooms can be seen by prior appointment.

=== Sir Peter Lely at Brook House ===
Several books say that Sir Peter Lely lived in Princes Risborough at Brook House and that he bought the house in 1671. This is not likely to be true. Lely was a wealthy and fashionable London painter (court painter from 1661), very busy, with a house at Covent Garden, where he had an impressive collection of pictures. Samuel Pepys, after visiting him in 1667, wrote that he was a "mighty proud man.....and full of state." It is highly improbable that such a man would have chosen or indeed would have been able to live in a small village in the Chilterns, 40 miles (64 km) from London. He had more work in London than he could easily manage. His wife died in childbirth in 1674 and was buried at St Pauls, Covent Garden, where Lely himself was buried after his death in 1680. His estate comprised his house in Covent Garden and investment properties in Surrey and Lincolnshire. No biography of the painter mentions a house at Princes Risborough.

This story came from a misunderstanding of a transaction in 1671, when he was recorded as purchasing a "fee farm rent" issuing out of the Manor of Princes Risborough. This was a perpetual rentcharge or ground rent secured on the rents and profits of the manor (not the Manor House, which was then Brook House). In other words, it was like a financial instrument securing an annual income. He would have bought it as an investment and would have received the income at stated intervals. It is very unlikely that he ever went near Princes Risborough himself.

== Market and fairs ==
The right to hold a weekly market and two yearly fairs was granted by King Henry VIII in 1523. The market was to be held on Wednesdays and the fairs on the eve, day and morrow of the Feast of the Nativity of the Blessed Virgin (8 September) and on the eve, day and morrow of St George's Day (23 April). The days were changed from time to time, the market to Saturday before 1792 and to Thursday in 1888. In 1792, there was only one fair (6 May) but the second was revived and by 1908 was held on 21 October.

The fact the town has a weekly market has come to define the parish with the words 'A Medieval Market Town since 1376', the very same year the Black Prince (the town's most notable Lord of the Manor) died.

For the past 100 years, the parish has also been well known for its independent developments both big and small. The big factory companies located just outside the town that provided much employment to people moving out of London after the Second World War were: Molins Tobacco Machinery Company, Forest Products Research Laboratory, Risborough Furniture, Enfield Upholstery, Austin Hoy and Leo Laboratories Ltd.

More recently, Princes Risborough's outskirt factory premises include Hypnos Beds, who have been granted royal warrants since 1929, were originally located in factory premises near to the railway station; they have since relocated to premises on the Longwick Road and continue to produce beds and mattresses. In 1920, Ercol Furniture set up premises in High Wycombe but, after 82 years, moved to Risborough in 2002 on new premises down Summerleys Road.

The smaller companies were mainly those based in the town and some have held the same locations since the early-20th century and continue to be a growing source of employment.

The Cross Keys Practice, was established at their current premises on the High Street in 1918. Before the First World War, the building was a second Coaching Inn on the High Street with the name Cross Keys Hotel with stables at the back of building which have now been refurbished into the independent Cross Keys House.

Wainwright's Shoe Shop was founded by Albert Wainwright in 1919. In about 1936, the business moved to premises along the Summerleys Road by the station, before moving to a large retail unit in Station Road before the War; this retail unit has now been demolished.

Padley and Binns, was a chemist and optician shop next door to Wainwrights that provided a lot of the patients of the Cross Keys Practice with their prescriptive medicines. To this day, it is still a chemist run by Lloyds Pharmacy.

== Modern times ==
The ecclesiastical parish of Princes Risborough today has approximately the same extent as the former manor and includes various hamlets scattered over the nearby Chiltern Hills. These include Alscot, Askett, Cadsden, Flowers Bottom, Loosley Row Lower North Dean, North Dean, Redland End, Speen and Upper North Dean.

The 1841 census lists the population of the town as 926.

After the Second World War, and partly due to the employment growth, the town's housing community steadily increased. The new housing estates (known affectionately as the Trees and Fields estates) were built in the 1950s as council houses.

The town is home to Princes Risborough School. Known affectionately as the 'Top School' for its location, it is a co-educational secondary school that opened in 1957. It took over secondary education from the nearby Bell Street School (its location was down the hill, and is now retirement flats).

Since the reintroduction of the red kite to the Chiltern Hills, Princes Risborough has become an ideal place to view this bird of prey. They are often sighted above the town and surrounding areas.

Princes Risborough has been featured several times in films and television series (e.g. Jonathan Creek, Inspector Morse, Midsomer Murders and Double First).

It is popular with commuters as it has excellent rail links to London and Birmingham.

== Notable people and artists ==
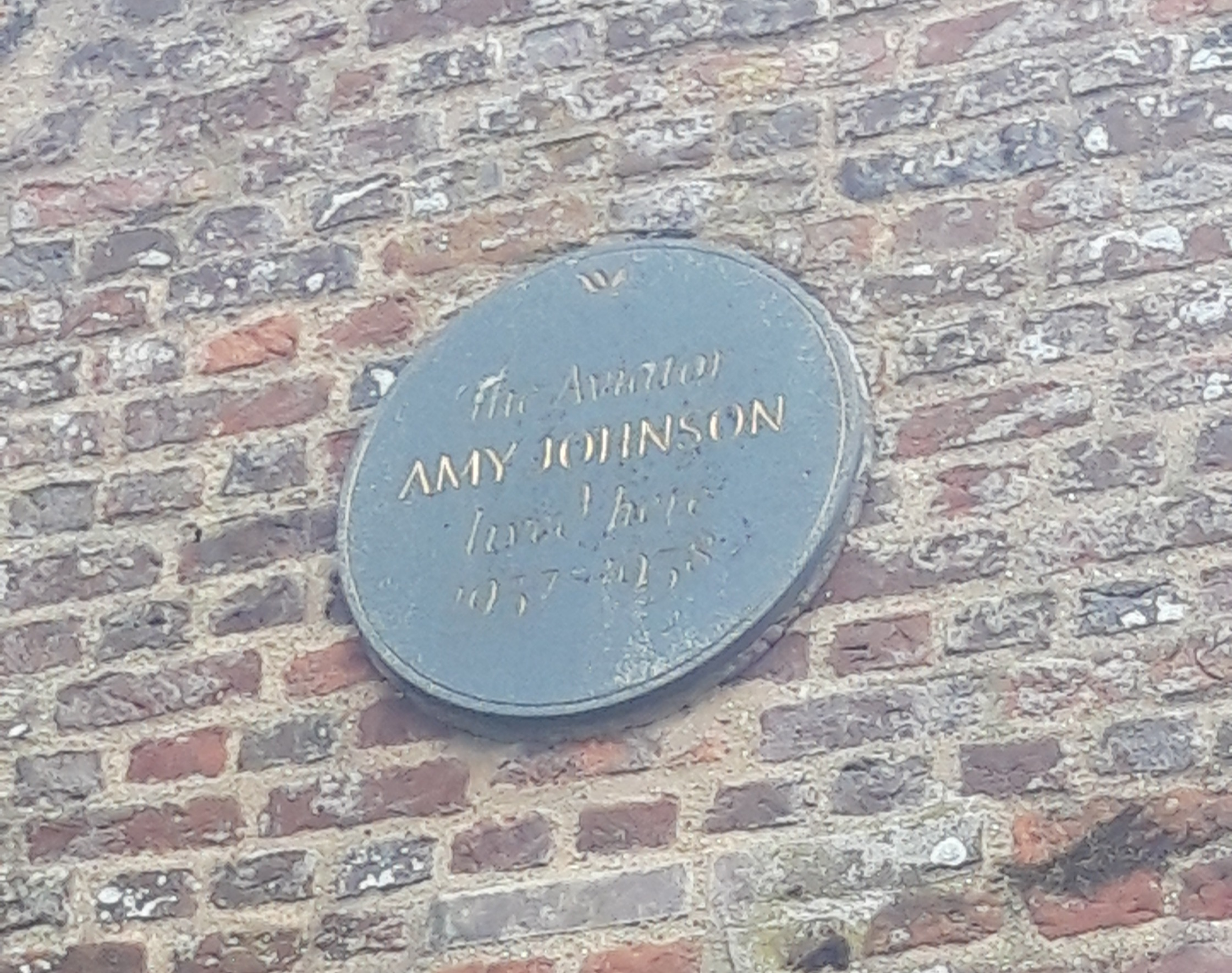
A plaque marking the house in which the pilot Amy Johnson lived from 1937 to 1938

- Edward Stone, a cleric who discovered the active ingredient of aspirin, salicylic acid was born in the town.
- Jabez West (1810–1884), a political reformer and temperance advocate, was born and raised in the town. The drinking fountain in Southwark Park commemorates his work in London.
- Nigel Harrison, former musician of Blondie; born in Stockport but grew up and went to school in Princes Risborough.
- Sarah Harding, singer and actress, from Girls Aloud was a former resident, living in Cadsden.
- Jay Kay, musician, from Jamiroquai is a resident of Horsenden.
- Minna Keal, composer (1909–1999), lived at Acres Plough, Shootacre Lane.
- Martin and Paul Kelly, musicians, from indie-pop band East Village grew up in the town and formed the band in Risborough.
- English indie-rock band Tiger originated from Princes Risborough.
- Lee McQueen, winner of The Apprentice series 4.
- Nicholas Parsons, broadcaster, was a resident in Ilmer until his death.
- Amy Johnson, a pioneering aviator and the first woman to fly from England to Australia, lived in Princes Risborough between 1937 and 1938.

== Sport and recreation ==
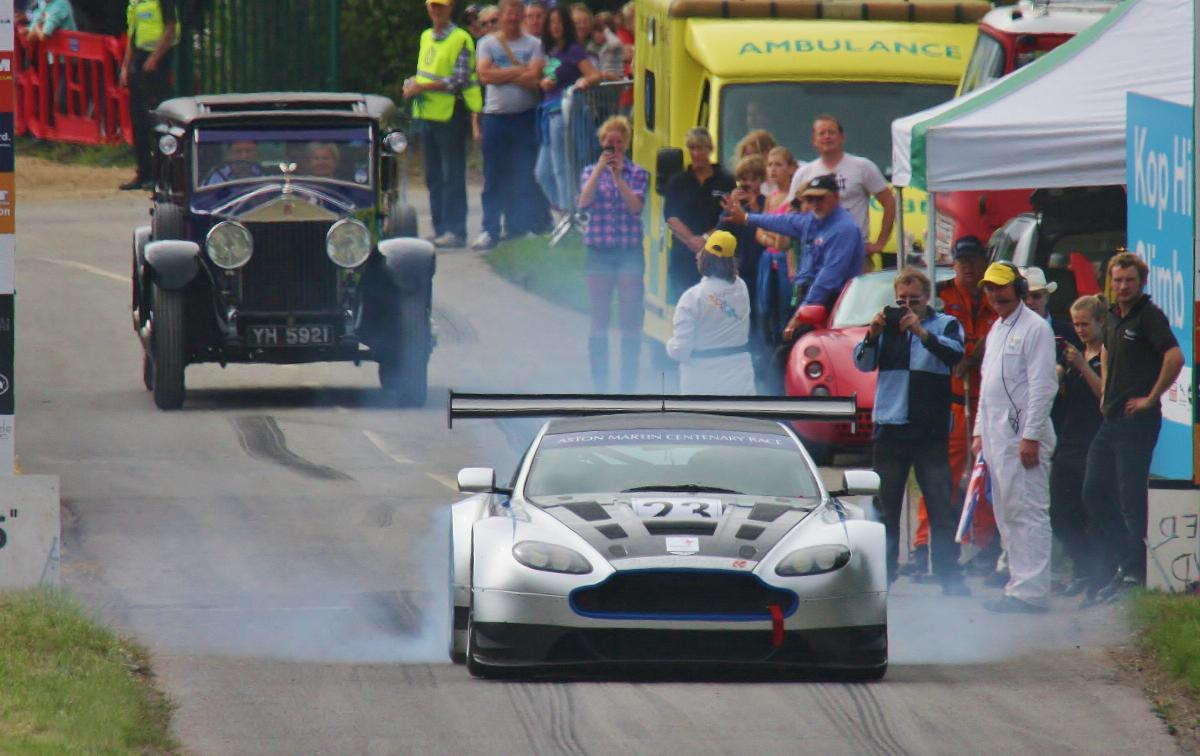
A photo taken at the Kop Hill Climb, 22 September 2013

Motorsport: The Kop Hill Climb is one of the oldest hill climb events in England, originally running from 1910 to 1925, when it was shut down due to safety concerns. Changes in the law allowed the event to be brought back in 2009, as a celebration of both classic and modern motorsport. The modern event attracts thousands of spectators annually, with over 26,000 visitors in 2015, and has earned over £600,000 for charity to date. Celebrity patrons have included Mary Berry, Nicholas Parsons, and Jay Kay.

Cricket: Princes Risborough Cricket Club meets at the Windsor Playing Fields, Horsenden, Nearby the Monks Risborough Cricket Club has a pitch at Whiteleaf, next to the Golf Club.

Football: Risborough Rangers has its headquarters at Windsor Playing Fields. Currently the side play in the Hellenic League (Division One East). They also have a number of teams playing at various venues within the town

Golf: There are a number of golf courses in the area: Princes Risborough Golf Club in Saunderton Lee, Whiteleaf Golf Club at Monks Risborough (9 holes) and somewhat further away the 18-hole Ellesborough Golf Club on land formerly part of the Chequers estate.

Lawn tennis and bowls: Princes Risborough Bowls Club and Princes Risborough Lawn Tennis Club have their own grounds off New Road, and Horsenden Tennis Club has courts at the Windsor Playing Fields, Horsenden.

Rugby: In 2008, Risborough Rugby Football Club was founded by local residents. The Whiteleaf Pub in the market square is used as a clubhouse for meetings and after training. They currently play in Berks/Bucks & Oxon Premiership Division.

Swimming: There is a covered pool at Risborough Springs off Stratton Road. Next to this is Wades Park, which has a children's play area and a basketball court.

Princes Risborough has a recreation ground on the left of the Aylesbury Road, known as King George's Field as a memorial to King George V.

== Transport ==
=== Railways ===
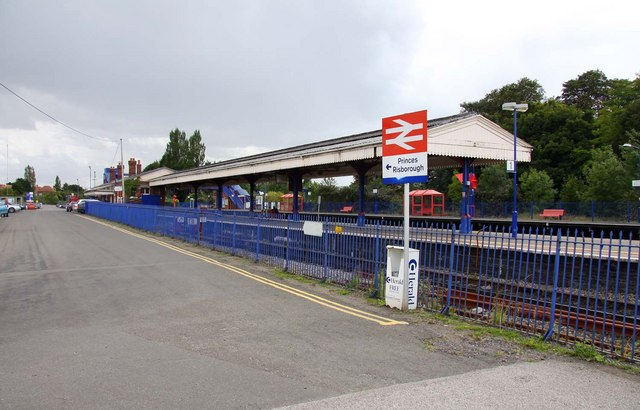
Princes Risborough station

Princes Risborough railway station is served by two National Rail routes, both operated by Chiltern Railways:

- Services between London Marylebone and Oxford; trains generally run twice an hour in each direction, with occasional peak-time calls from trains to Banbury and Birmingham Snow Hill
- A shuttle service, at 60-90 minute intervals, on a single-track line to Aylesbury; occasional services extend through to London Marylebone.

In addition, the Chinnor and Princes Risborough Railway operates heritage services to Chinnor, along the foot of the Chilterns escarpment.

=== Buses ===
Bus routes in Princes Risborough are operated by Risborough Area Community Bus, Red Rose Travel, Redline Buses and Z&S Transport. These serve the locality and connect the town with Aylesbury, Chinnor, High Wycombe and Oakley.

== Local media ==
Television programmes and local news is provided by BBC South and ITV Meridian, received from the Oxford TV transmitter.

The town is served by both BBC Radio Oxford and BBC Three Counties Radio. Other radio stations including Heart South, Greatest Hits Radio Bucks, Beds and Herts (formerly Mix 96), Tring Radio (Bucks Herts and Beds) and Red Kite Radio that broadcast from Aylesbury.

The Bucks Free Press is the town's weekly local newspaper.

== Local Community ==
Princes Risborough Town Council aims to serve both residents and visitors, highlighting the town's unique community benefits. The website provides valuable information for prospective residents, tourists, and visitors, ensuring they can fully enjoy all the town offers. The Council welcomes all and encourages exploration of Princes Risborough's local attractions.

The Risborough Area Partnership (RAP) is the umbrella organisation for business local government and community groups in Princes Risborough. There are several community events organised across the year.
