= Cadsden =

Hamlet in South Buckinghamshire, England

Coordinates: 51.735075°N 0.805877°W

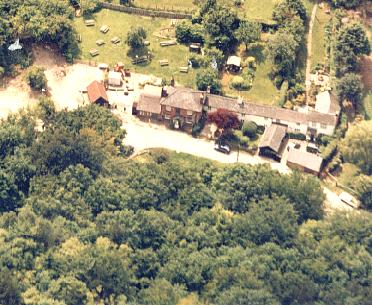
- The Plough at Cadsden

- Location within Buckinghamshire
- OS grid reference: SP825047
- Civil parish: Princes Risborough
- Unitary authority: Buckinghamshire
- Ceremonial county: Buckinghamshire
- Region: South East
- Country: England
- Sovereign state: United Kingdom
- Post town: PRINCES RISBOROUGH
- Postcode district: HP27
- Dialling code: 01844
- Police: Thames Valley
- Fire: Buckinghamshire
- Ambulance: South Central
- UK Parliament: Mid Buckinghamshire

Cadsden is a hamlet in South Buckinghamshire, England, two miles north east of Princes Risborough. At the time of the 2011 Census, the population of the hamlet was included in the civil parish of Lacey Green.

== History ==
The origin of the name is doubtful and it is unknown when it was first used. If it dates back to Anglo-Saxon times, when most of the other local place names first appeared, it probably meant 'valley frequented by wild cats'.

It is said that in 1643 a wake was held in Cadsden for John Hampden by his beloved Greencoats, whilst escorting his body back to the family home at Great Hampden from Thame, where he died following the Battle of Chalgrove Field.

On 30 January 1943 a Royal Air Force (RAF) Avro Anson Mk1 serial no. L7964 was on a Night Navigation Training exercise from the Central School of Navigation, flying from RAF Cranage, Cheshire. The weather conditions were poor and at 0250 hours the Anson crashed at Longdown Farm in Cadsden, killing all four crew members.

== Transport ==
The railway service in the area was improved in 2011 with the Chiltern Mainline project. The two nearest mainline railway stations are Princes Risborough (2 miles) and Great Missenden (9 miles), with a branchline station at Monks Risborough (1 mile).

== Local amenities and traditions ==
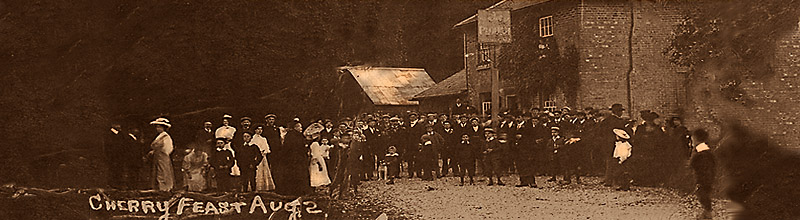
Cherry Pie Festival

Every year on the first Sunday in August there is a Cherry Pie Festival, which has been a tradition in Cadsden for over 100 years.

Grangelands and Pulpit Hill, which stretch from Cadsden to Kimble, are a Site of Special Scientific Interest (SSSI) with an array of wildlife including glow worms and the bee orchid. Up on Pulpit Hill, set within Pulpit Woods, are the remains of an Iron Age hill fort, a scheduled ancient monument.

In 2010, several sites in Buckinghamshire, including Pulpit Hill, were chosen to help conserve the common juniper, due to a 40% decline in the plant's local population. The project was partly funded by Buckinghamshire County Council. It is unclear what caused the juniper plant's decline in the area. Threats possibly include foraging species, such as deer and rabbits, as well as Phytophthora root rot and Phytophthora austrocedrae.

Whiteleaf Golf Course, which occupies the land between Whiteleaf and Cadsden, is a 9-hole course established in 1907. During the winter months when it snows, the Cadsden end of the course is used for tobogganing.

Local issues are addressed and events organised by the Whiteleaf and Cadsden Resident's Association.

Sarah Harding from Girls Aloud was a resident of Cadsden between 2008 and 2017.

== Relationship with Prime Ministers ==
Chequers, the Prime Minister's country residence, is the first property encountered along The Ridgeway path north east from Cadsden. This walk was featured in an article published by The Sunday Times in June 2010.

The Plough at Cadsden is a country pub which is used by Prime Ministers due to its proximity to Chequers.

In November 2015, former Prime Minister David Cameron visited The Plough with General Secretary of the Chinese Communist Party Xi Jinping for a pint of real ale and fish and chips.

== Millionaires Row ==
Cadsden is colloquially known as "Millionaires Row," since the average house price on Cadsden Road is over £1 million. The average property price, as of 2022, is £1,295,000, which is nearly double the average in London.

== TV location ==
Cadsden was featured in the Midsomer Murders episode "Down Among the Dead Men" where it was called Cadsden Ridge.

Cadsden Road was used in an episode of Hammer House of Horror, where Warren Clarke crashed his car there.
