= Grangelands and Pulpit Hill =

Protected area in Buckinghamshire, England

Coordinates: 51.7376°N 0.8009°W

- Site of Special Scientific Interest
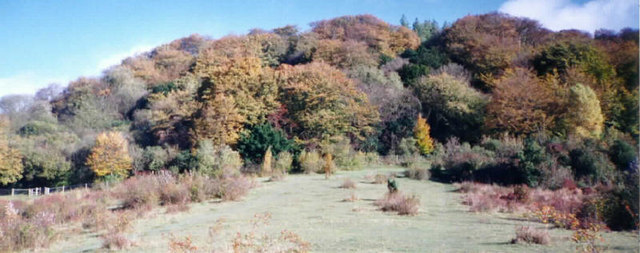
- The woods on the side of Pulpit Hill
- Location of Grangelands and Pulpit Hill.
- Area of search: Buckinghamshire
- Grid reference: SP829050
- Interest: Biological
- Area: 25.5 ha (63 acres)
- Notification date: 1985
- Location map: Magic Map

Grangelands and Pulpit Hill is a 25.5-hectare (63-acre) biological Site of Special Scientific Interest in Cadsden in Buckinghamshire. It lies within the Chilterns Area of Outstanding Natural Beauty, and the planning authorities are Wycombe District Council and Buckinghamshire County Council.

== Ownership ==
Pulpit Hill is a National Trust site, and Grangelands was formerly owned by Buckinghamshire County Council and was transferred to the Berkshire, Buckinghamshire and Oxfordshire Wildlife Trust in 2014.

== Biodiversity ==
The site has grassland and scrub, which support interesting breeding birds and invertebrates, such as glow-worms and marbled white and chalkhill blue butterflies. There are areas of mature beech woodland, with a sparse shrub layer of holly and elder, and a ground layer of wood sorrel, woodruff, broad helleborine and tufted hairgrass. Further down the slope there is mixed woodland of recent origin where the beech trees are associated with a variety of other trees and shrubs including yew, ash, whitebeam and wild cherry, blackthorn, hawthorn and purging buckthorn. Several orchids can be found here including white helleborine, narrow-lipped helleborine, yellow bird's-nest orchid and bird's-nest orchid.

There are several areas of scrubland, and several types of grassland, each with its characteristic flora of downland plants. These include cowslip, field scabious, greater and lesser knapweeds, marjoram, common St John's wort and basil, as well as the common spotted orchid, the bee orchid, the pyramidal orchid and the fragrant orchid.

== History ==
There is a small but well-preserved multivallate hill fort on the summit of Pulpit Hill, which dates to the late Bronze Age and Iron Age. It is a scheduled monument under the Ancient Monuments and Archaeological Areas Act 1979. English Heritage (now Historic England) carried out an archaeological survey and investigation of the prehistoric hillfort in November 2000.

The site is always open but accessibility is difficult for anyone who is not able bodied, due to steep slopes and soft ground.

== See also ==
- List of Sites of Special Scientific Interest in Buckinghamshire
