= Horsenden =

Hamlet in Buckinghamshire, England

Coordinates: 51°43′10.24″N 0°51′11.63″W

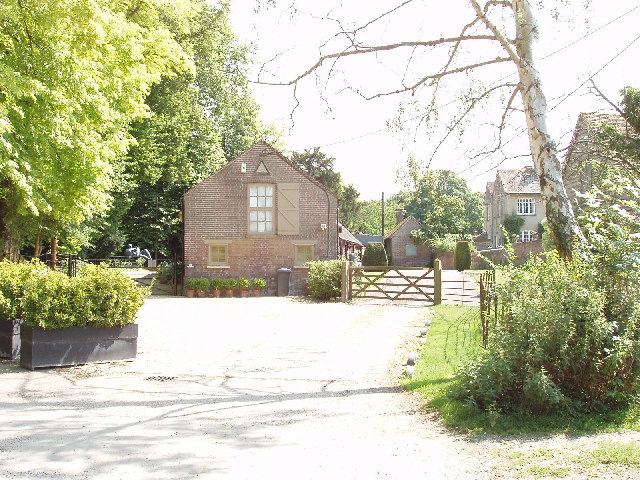
- Horsenden village houses, 2005

- Location within Buckinghamshire
- Civil parish: Longwick-cum-Ilmer
- Unitary authority: Buckinghamshire
- Ceremonial county: Buckinghamshire
- Region: South East
- Country: England
- Sovereign state: United Kingdom

Horsenden is a hamlet in the civil parish of Longwick-cum-Ilmer, in Buckinghamshire, England. It is approximately one mile west of Princes Risborough, seven miles south of Aylesbury and three miles south-west of Chinnor in Oxfordshire. The Icknield Way passes just to the north of the village from north-east to south-west, although there is no connecting road through the hamlet itself.

== Name ==
The name Horsenden is from the Anglo Saxon Horsan-dun and means 'Horsa's hill or valley'. Horsa was one of the first Anglo Saxon settlers of Britain, who settled in Kent in the Fifth century. The association of the area to Horsa is unknown.

== History ==
After the Norman Conquest the land was in the possession of the Count of Mortain. After 1215 it was passed to Robert de Braybrook. Sir John Donne then acquired the estates in 1480. Horsenden House as it was then known was garrisoned during the English Civil War for Charles I by the Royalist Sir John Denham who managed to maintain possession after the Restoration.

During the 18th and 19th century there were a number of owners and the House slipped into neglect. In 1810, the House was restored and rebuilt and sometime later renamed Horsenden Manor.

At the height of The Blitz during the Second World War, the insurance company Norwich Union moved their offices from Piccadilly, Fleet Street and St James' into the Manor but after the war they moved back to their London offices.

Jamiroquai front man Jay Kay has owned Horsenden Manor as his primary residence since 1995 and has a recording studio, granary and garages for his top-end car collection. In 2020 he applied to extend the property.

The parish church is dedicated to St Michael and All Angels. A church has stood on the site since at least 1210. The oldest part of the current building dates from the 15th century. In 1765, the nave and west tower were demolished and the current tower was built, it still contains its original bell dated 1582 and in the late 19th century the chancel was extended 8 feet to the east.

Horsenden was an ancient parish. In 1934 the parish was abolished and its area split between the three civil parishes of Longwick-cum-Ilmer, Bledlow-cum-Saunderton and Princes Risborough, with the small settlement of Horsenden itself being in the area added to Longwick-cum-Ilmer. At the 1931 census (the last before the abolition of the parish), Horsenden had a population of 53.

The hamlet has its own tennis club, and on the same site can be found Princes Risborough's football and cricket teams.
