= Bert Foord =

English meteorologist (1930–2001)

- Born: Herbert Vernon Foord; 22 December 1930; Brough, Cumbria, England
- Died: 31 July 2001 (aged 70); Aylesbury, Buckinghamshire, England
- Occupation: Meteorologist
- Years active: 1947–1990
- Employer: Meteorological Office
- Spouse: Irene Young (m. 1954; died 2001)
- Children: 1

Herbert Vernon Foord (22 December 1930 – 31 July 2001) was an English meteorologist and BBC weather forecaster during the 1960s and early 1970s. He joined the UK Meteorological Office as a trainee forecaster in 1947 and became the BBC's principal weather forecaster in 1963, remaining in the role until 1974. Foord specialised in forecasting for the Royal Air Force until his retirement in 1990.

== Early life ==
Foord was born on 22 December 1930, in Brough, near Appleby-in-Westmorland, Cumbria, the second son in his family. His father was a Royal Navy serviceman, and his mother, Eva, was the daughter of a tinsmith from Carlisle. The family name Foord came from South Africa and is of Dutch origin. From the age of nine, he attended Appleby Grammar School on a scholarship before moving to Carlisle Grammar School when his family returned to Carlisle.

== Career ==
Having an keen interest in the weather, Foord joined the UK Meteorological Office as a trainee forecaster in 1947 after answering a newspaper advertisement. His first posting was to the Eskdalemuir Observatory in the Scottish borders, where he worked between 1950 and 1953, followed by three years' voluntary service on the small weather ships in the mid-Atlantic. In 1954, Foord was made the North West of England representative for the Met Office National Committee, rising to the rank of chairman. He joined the London Weather Centre in 1960 and began broadcasting on radio in 1961.

He became the principal BBC weather forecaster in 1963, and his low-key presentation style made him a national institution, although his positive northern demeanour attracted some press criticism. In March 1968, Foord successfully negotiated a pay rise for BBC forecasters' rates from £3 to £5 10s a day backdated to 15 October 1966 through the Civil Service Arbitration Tribunal. One of the highlights of his career came in 1969 during the BBC coverage of the Apollo 12 mission, when he predicted that the spacecraft could face some turbulence on take-off and might be struck by lightning. Within half an hour, lightning struck the spacecraft.

By the time he left the BBC, his celebrity had led to the distinction of being a guest on Roy Plomley's Desert Island Discs, and made guest appearances on programmes such as Points of View and twice on Late Night Line-Up. In May 1970, Foord appeared as King Lear in Whatever Next?, the first programme of the BBC's satirical comedy television series Celebrity Shakespeare. In April 1971, Foord presented an episode of the BBC1 series Search on a weather ship in the North Atlantic.

He left the BBC in 1974 after 11 years in his civil service promotion from higher to senior scientific officer, specialising in forecasting for the Royal Air Force (RAF). He first worked in weather forecasting at Heathrow Airport, and spent a year as a weather forecaster at RAF Gan in the Maldives in 1975 and 1976. Between 1979 and 1984, Foord was senior met officer at RAF Wildenrath and Gütersloh in West Germany. In 1980, he became the subject of a "Bring Back Bert Foord" campaign started by presenter Terry Wogan, who complained the British weather had deteriorated since Foord stopped presenting the weather forecasts. Foord was appointed principal forecaster for the Royal Air Force Strike Command in an underground bunker near High Wycombe in 1984.

His off-screen persona was quite different from his media image, being relaxed, jovial and outgoing (he ran the London Marathon in 1987). He retired from the Met Office in 1990. That same year, Foord was elected a distinguished member of the union called the Institution of Professionals, Managers and Specialists (IPMS) and was appointed an trustee of the union. He was earlier elected a member of the IPMS's national executive committee in May 1970, and was a member of the Cheltenham Racing Club.

== Personal life ==
He lived in Loosley Row, in the former Wycombe District of Buckinghamshire. In 1954, Foord married Irene Young at Christ Church, Botchergate. They had one child. In 1998, Foord was diagnosed with cancer. He died of cancer at Stoke Mandeville Hospital, Aylesbury, Buckinghamshire on 31 July 2001.
