= Hypnos (company) =

British bed and mattress manufacturer

Showroom in Princes Risborough, Buckinghamshire

Hypnos is a British company that manufactures mattresses and beds for homes and hotels.

Factory building, 2008

It was founded by 1904 and is based in Princes Risborough, Buckinghamshire. It has held a royal warrant continuously since 1929.
