= Loosley Row =

Hamlet in Buckinghamshire, England

Coordinates: 51.697340°N 0.822179°W

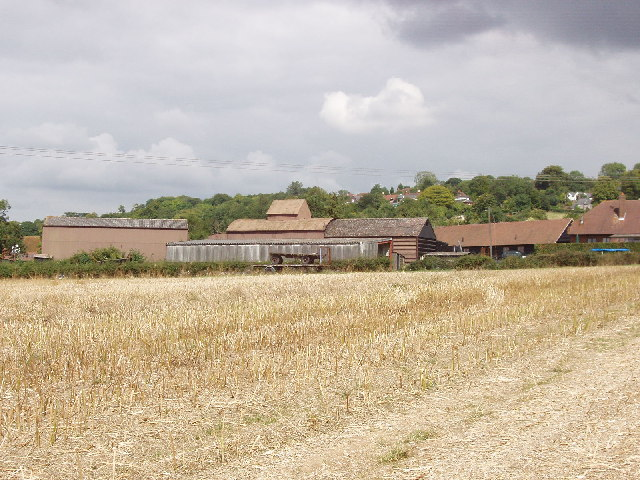
- Farm buildings at Loosley Row

- Location within Buckinghamshire
- OS grid reference: SP815005
- Civil parish: Lacey Green
- Unitary authority: Buckinghamshire
- Ceremonial county: Buckinghamshire
- Region: South East
- Country: England
- Sovereign state: United Kingdom
- Post town: PRINCES RISBOROUGH
- Postcode district: HP27
- Dialling code: 01844
- Police: Thames Valley
- Fire: Buckinghamshire
- Ambulance: South Central
- UK Parliament: Mid Buckinghamshire constituency

Loosley Row is a hamlet in the civil parish of Lacey Green, Buckinghamshire, England. It is located in the Chiltern Hills to the east of the main town of Princes Risborough. In the 2011 Census, the population was recorded in the Lacey Green Parish, which included Speen, parts of Walter's Ash, and Lacey Green, with a combined population of 2,559.

The hamlet sits on a west-facing chalk escarpment, that stretches to north-eastwards to Coombe Hill.

== History ==
The hamlet name derives from the Old English hlose-leah, and means 'pigstye-clearing'. It is often said that the hamlet was named after the Loosley family but it is, in fact, the other way round – the family was named after the place.

The Domesday Book talks of the large number of pigs at (Princes) Risborough. Pigs were often found in clearings at the edges of the woods, the animals allowed to wander through sectioned areas of the woods. The row of piggeries in the lea of the woods became the start of a settlement called Loosley Row. Loosley Row stretched from Brimmer's Farm, east of Princes Risborough, round the side of the hill to the hamlet we know today. It included Wardrobes farm and Wardrobes House. The old township of Loosley Row, stretched over to Bledlow Ridge, across what is now the A4010 road.

The underlying geology consists of chalk which typifies the area around Princes Risborough. Loosley Row sits as the south end of a chalk escarpment that runs south-westwards from Coombe Hill to Loosley Row and affords good views of the Vale of Aylesbury to the west.

The hamlet used to have a chapel, a school, a village store, a bakery and a post office, but these have all now been closed (the school was shut down in 1916). The hamlet also has a dried up parish well, which is situated on what is claimed to be the smallest patch of common land in the Chilterns. A forge, which lends its name to Foundry Lane through the hamlet, still operates in Loosley Row. It has created some of the bus shelters seen on the road through Lacey Green from Princes Risborough.

== Notable people ==
The television astronomer, Heather Couper, lived in the hamlet.

Meteorologist and BBC weather forecaster Bert Foord was a resident.

Astronomer, science writer and Virgin Galactic astronaut Nigel Henbest has lived in Loosley Row for over 30 years.
