= Lacey Green =

Village and civil parish in Buckinghamshire, England

Coordinates: 51.694°N 0.810°W

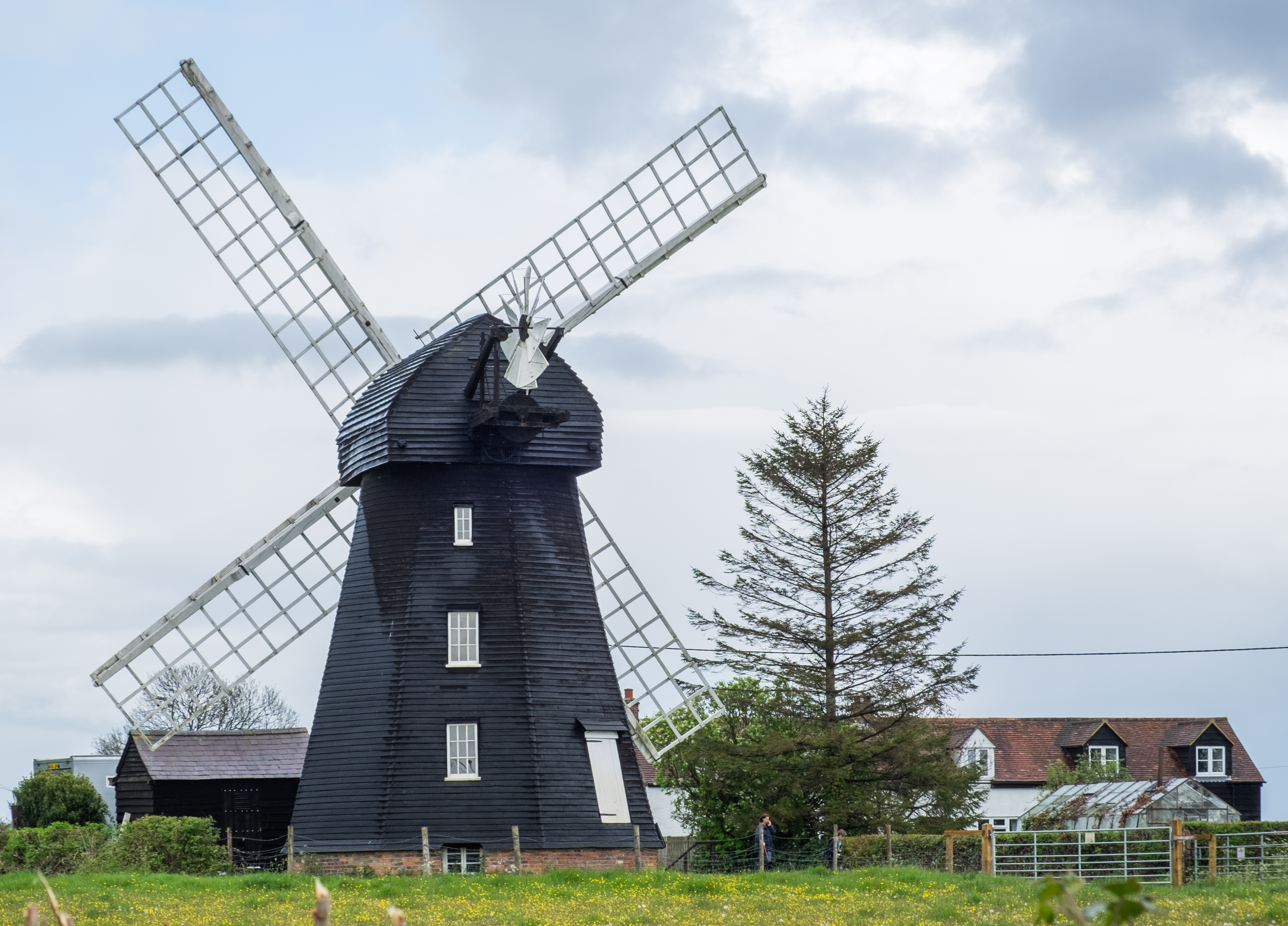
- Lacey Green Windmill in 2021

- Location within Buckinghamshire
- Population: 2,413; 2,559 (2011 Census including Calsden, Loosley Row and Speen)
- OS grid reference: SP824001
- Civil parish: Lacey Green
- Unitary authority: Buckinghamshire
- Ceremonial county: Buckinghamshire
- Region: South East
- Country: England
- Sovereign state: United Kingdom
- Post town: Princes Risborough
- Postcode district: HP27
- Dialling code: 01844
- Police: Thames Valley
- Fire: Buckinghamshire
- Ambulance: South Central
- UK Parliament: Mid Buckinghamshire
- Website: Parish Council

Lacey Green is a village and civil parish in the Buckinghamshire district, south-east of Princes Risborough, in the ceremonial county of Buckinghamshire, England. It is in the Chiltern Hills above the town. In 2021 the parish had a population of 2,397.

The settlement was known as Leasy Green in the early 19th century. Hamlets within the parish include Loosley Row, Speen, Wardrobes and Parslow's Hillock.

During World War II RAF Bomber Command commandeered agricultural land for an airfield. The land has since reverted to agriculture, the school playing field and the village sports ground.

The church of St John the Evangelist was built in 1822–1825, at first as a chapel of ease; the chancel was added in 1871 to designs of J. P. Seddon, with coloured brick to the interior. The parish is within the area of the Risborough team ministry. Primitive Methodists built a chapel on the main road around 1842, which remained in use until 2001.

The village has a shop, sports club, village hall and a primary school. There are three pubs: the Black Horse in the village, the Whip Inn at Loosley and the Pink and Lily at Parslow's Hillock. It is twinned with Hambye, France.

Lacey Green was home to the chef Heston Blumenthal, whose parents used to own amusement arcades in the area.

== Lacey Green windmill ==
Dated to 1650 by leading authority Stanley Freese, Lacey Green windmill is the oldest surviving smock mill in England and was restored in the 1970s, from a state of almost total collapse, by volunteers under the auspices of the Chiltern Society. The octagonal structure has a brick base carrying a weatherboarded timber frame; the sails are modern but the machinery is largely original. The windmill was designated as Grade II* listed in 1985.

Though it is widely believed that the mill was originally sited in nearby Chesham and moved to Lacey Green in 1821, no primary sources have been found to substantiate this and the Chiltern Society has been unable to trace the story before 1832. One possible explanation of the story's origin was advanced by Michael Highfield, author of the Chiltern Society's guide to the mill. He had a conversation with a 96-year-old lady who had lived in the area all her life and remembered being chased away from "Cheshums Mill" as a child. The Mill had been in the Cheshire family since the 1860s and was sometimes referred to locally as Cheshire's mill, applying the Buckinghamshire dialect possessive suffix 'ums', Cheshire's becomes Cheshums.
