= List of Sites of Special Scientific Interest in Essex =

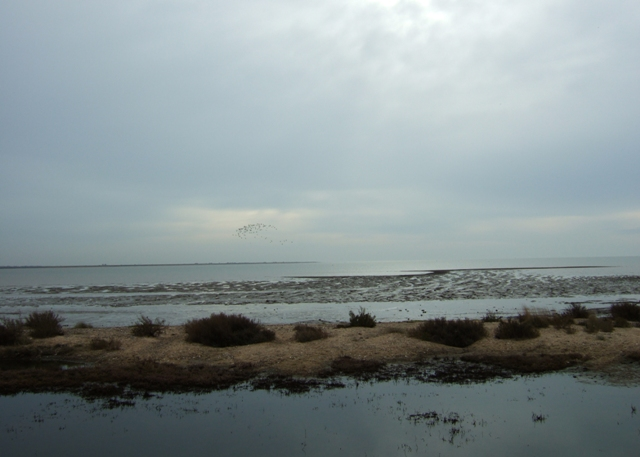
Tidal mud flats, East Mersea, in the Colne Estuary

Essex is a county in the east of England. In the early Anglo-Saxon period it was the Kingdom of the East Saxons, but it gradually came under the control of more powerful kingdoms, and in the ninth century it became part of Wessex. The modern county is bounded by Suffolk and Cambridgeshire to the north, Hertfordshire to the west, Greater London to the south-west, Kent across the River Thames to the south, and the North Sea to the east. It has an area of 1,420 square miles (3,700 km^{2}), with a coastline of 400 miles (640 km), and a population according to the 2011 census of 1,393,600. At the top level of local government are Essex County Council and two unitary authorities, Southend-on-Sea and Thurrock. Under the county council, there are twelve district and borough councils.

In England, Sites of Special Scientific Interest (SSSIs) are designated by Natural England, which is responsible for protecting England's natural environment. Designation as an SSSI gives legal protection to the most important wildlife and geological sites. As of August 2016, there are 86 sites designated in Essex. There are 19 sites with a purely geological interest, and 64 listed for biological interest. A further three sites are designated for both reasons.

The largest is Foulness, which is internationally important for wildfowl and waders, and has 71 nationally rare invertebrate species. The smallest is Holland-on-Sea Cliff, a geological site which throws light on the course of the River Thames before it was diverted south by the Anglian glaciation around 450,000 years ago. Hangman's Wood and Deneholes has deneholes, shafts created by medieval chalk mining which are now used by hibernating bats. Lion Pit is the site of flint-knapping by Neanderthals around 200,000 years ago, and it has been possible to fit back together some of the flint flakes.

== Key ==
=== Interest ===
- B = site of biological interest
- G = site of geological interest

=== Public access ===
- FP = access to footpaths through the site only
- NO = no public access to site
- PP = public access to part of site
- YES = public access to site

=== Other classifications ===
- BSO = Bird Sanctuary Order
- Buglife = Buglife – The Invertebrate Conservation Trust
- DVAONB = Dedham Vale Area of Outstanding Natural Beauty
- EWT = Essex Wildlife Trust
- GCR = Geological Conservation Review
- HMWT = Herts and Middlesex Wildlife Trust
- LNR = Local Nature Reserve
- NCR = Nature Conservation Review site
- NNR = National Nature Reserve
- NT = National Trust
- Ramsar = Ramsar site
- RSPB = Royal Society for the Protection of Birds
- SAC = Special Area of Conservation
- SAONB = Suffolk Coast and Heaths Area of Outstanding Natural Beauty
- SM = Scheduled Monument
- SPA = Special Protection Area

== Sites ==
Site name	Photograph	B	G	Area (Note: The area and grid reference are taken from the "Details" page for each site on the Natural England database.)	Public access	Location	Other classifications	Map (Note: The maps are provided by Natural England on the Magic Map website.)	Citation (Note: Citations are provided for each site by Natural England.)	Description
Abberton Reservoir	Abberton Reservoir	✓		718.3 hectares (1,775 acres)	PP	Layer de la Haye; 51.825°N 0.862°E; TL973179	EWT, NCR, Ramsar, SPA	Map	Citation	This site is of international significance for wintering wigeons, and nationally important for twelve other waterfowl species, including mute swans, gadwalls, tufted ducks, goldeneyes and goosanders. It is also very unusual in having cormorants nesting in trees.
Ardleigh Gravel Pit	Ardleigh Gravel Pit		✓	1.2 hectares (3.0 acres)	PP	Ardleigh; 51.914°N 0.986°E; TM055281	GCR	Map	Citation	This site exposes a number of interglacials, including one dated to the Hoxnian Stage around 400,000 years ago, and some much older. It also has a horizon with very rare plant micro-fossils dating to a cold period.
Ashdon Meadows	Ashdon Meadows	✓		1.4 hectares (3.5 acres)	YES	Saffron Walden; 52.036°N 0.318°E; TL591401		Map	Citation	The site is unimproved grassland which is used for hay growing, with some areas calcareous and others neutral. It is the only known example of grassland on chalky boulder clay in north-west Essex. Flora includes salad burnet, downy oat-grass and fen bedstraw.
Basildon Meadows	Basildon Meadows	✓		6.8 hectares (17 acres)	NO	Basildon; 51.553°N 0.455°E; TQ703867		Map	Citation	The site is composed of three unimproved meadows which have a wide variety of herbs. Flowers include the green-winged orchid and yellow rattle, which are rare in Essex. There is also a small pond and scattered scrub.
Belcher's and Broadfield Woods	Broadfield Wood	✓		14.4 hectares (36 acres)	YES	Halstead; 51.909°N 0.630°E; TL810267	EWT	Map	Citation	The site is coppice woodland on chalky boulder clay. There is a variety of woodlands types, such as wet ash and maple, and acid birch, ash and lime. The ground flora includes species which are locally uncommon, including greater butterfly-orchid and bird's-nest orchid.
Benfleet and Southend Marshes	Benfleet and Southend Marshes	✓		2,373.7 hectares (5,866 acres)	PP	Southend-on-Sea; 51.57°N 0.68°E; TQ859842	EWT, LNR, NCR, NNR, Ramsar, SPA	Map	Citation	The marshes and mudflats have internationally important numbers of wildfowl and waders, including the dark-bellied brent goose, grey plover, redshank and knot. Some areas are very important for scarce invertebrates, such as white-letter hairstreak and marbled white butterflies.
Blackwater Estuary	Blackwater Estuary	✓		4,403.5 hectares (10,881 acres)	YES	Maldon; 51.74°N 0.81°E; TL943084	EWT, NCR,NNR, Ramsar, SAC, SPA	Map	Citation	The estuary has internationally important numbers of wintering dark-bellied brent geese, ringed plover and dunlin, and nationally important numbers of nine species. There are sixteen invertebrates on the IUCN Red List of Threatened Species.
Blake's Wood & Lingwood Common	Bluebells in Blakes Wood	✓		87.3 hectares (216 acres)	YES	Danbury; 51.728°N 0.567°E; TL774064	NT	Map	Citation	This site has a variety of heath, woodland and marsh habitats, and four of the woodland types are unusual in Britain. The woodlands have diverse bird species, and two unusual moths, the silver barred and rosy marbled, have been recorded on the common.
Bovingdon Hall Woods	Bovingdon Wood	✓		71.3 hectares (176 acres)	NO	Braintree; 51.928°N 0.555°E; TL758286		Map	Citation	The site is coppice woodland of medieval origin on chalky boulder clay. It has unusual woodland types, such as small-leaved lime and plateau alder. Other trees include sessile and peduculate oak, ash, maple and hornbeam, with occasional wild service tree.
Bullock Wood	Bullock Wood	✓		23.5 hectares (58 acres)	NO	Colchester; 51.912°N 0.934°E; TM019278		Map	Citation	The site is mature coppice with a wide variety of trees. The main woodland type is hazel and sessile oak, which is rare nationally. The understorey is mainly coppiced hazel, and the ground flora is dominated by bramble and bracken.
Canvey Wick	Canvey Wick	✓		93.2 hectares (230 acres)	YES	Canvey Island; 51.522°N 0.536°E; TQ760834	Buglife, RSPB	Map	Citation	Canvey Wick has a nationally important population of invertebrates, including 22 on the IUCN Red List of Threatened Species, and three which had been recorded as extinct in Britain. It also has a nationally important population of shrill carder bees. Scrub edges provide additional habitats.
Cattawade Marshes	Cattawade Marshes	✓		89.2 hectares (220 acres)	NO	Manningtree; 51.955°N 1.040°E; TM090329	DVAONB, Ramsar, RSPB, SPA	Map	Citation	The site is a marsh area between two arms of the River Stour. It is of major importance for breeding birds, especially waders and wildfowl, such as Shoveler, Teal, Tufted Duck and Water Rail. Other habitats are grassland and ditches.
Chalkney Wood	Chalkney Wood	✓		73.7 hectares (182 acres)	YES	Earls Colne; 51.916°N 0.723°E; TL874277		Map	Citation	The ancient woodland is on acid silts and sands. Trees include, ash, lime birch and pedunculated oak. The ground layer is dominated by bramble, and other plants include primrose and wood anemone. The wood is divided by grassy rides, and there are over twenty ponds.
Clacton Cliffs and Foreshore	Clacton Cliffs and Foreshore		✓	26.3 hectares (65 acres)	PP	Clacton-on-Sea; 51.779°N 1.131°E; TM161136	GCR	Map	Citation	This site dates to the warm Hoxnian Stage around 400,000 years ago. Flint tools found there have made it the type site for the Clactonian, a core-and-flake industry of homo erectus, although paleontologists disagree whether it is really a separate industry from the Acheulian.
The Cliff, Burnham-on-Crouch	The Cliff, Burnham-on-Crouch		✓	3.8 hectares (9.4 acres)	YES	Burnham-on-Crouch; 51.636°N 0.775°E; TQ921967	GCR	Map	Citation	Fossils birds dating to the Lower Eocene, around 55 to 48 million years ago, have been found at this site, and it has yielded the type material of two species. Considerable quantities of fossil fishes have also been found, mainly sharks, and it is the type locality for several species.
Colne Estuary	Colne Estuary	✓	✓	2,986.5 hectares (7,380 acres)	YES	Brightlingsea; 51.81°N 0.99°E; TM062161	EWT GCR, NCR, NNR, Ramsar, SAC, SPA	Map	Citation	The site has varied habitats, such as saltmarsh, mud flats, shingle spits and former gravel pits. It is of international importance for wintering brent geese and black-tailed godwits, and of national importance for six other bird species, including little terns.
The Coppice, Kelvedon Hatch	The Coppice, Kelvedon Hatch	✓		9.3 hectares (23 acres)	NO	Kelvedon Hatch; 51.67°N 0.273°E; TQ573992		Map	Citation	The site is an ancient semi-natural wood in the valley of a small tributary of the River Roding. It is base-rich alder on the valley floor, and oak and hornbeam in other areas. The geology is complex, with areas of Claygate Beds and Bagshot Beds.
Cornmill Stream and Old River Lea	Cornmill Meadows	✓		25.1 hectares (62 acres)	YES	Waltham Abbey; 51.693°N 0.006°W; TL379012		Map	Citation	The slow-moving Cornmill Stream and Old River Lea form a freshwater habitat with one of the most diverse invertebrate fauna in Essex. Eighteen species of dragonflies and damselflies have been recorded, including the uncommon and nationally declining white-legged damselfly.
Crouch and Roach Estuaries	Crouch Estuary	✓		1,729.1 hectares (4,273 acres)	YES	Burnham-on-Crouch; 51.62°N 0.73°E; TQ889953	EWT Ramsar, SAC, SPA	Map	Citation	The site is internationally important for wintering dark-bellied brent geese, and nationally important for black-tailed godwits, shelducks and shoveler ducks. There are invertebrates on the IUCN Red List of Threatened Species, such as the ground lackey moth, and dense populations of the nationally scarce Roesel's bush-cricket.
Curtismill Green	Curtismill Green	✓		47.8 hectares (118 acres)	YES	Epping; 51.645°N 0.193°E; TQ518963		Map	Citation	This is unimproved grassland and scrub with both damp and dry areas, with a number of uncommon species. Notable plant species in grassland areas include Orange Foxtail, Lesser Spearwort and Yellow Rattle.
Danbury Common	Danbury Common	✓		71.0 hectares (175 acres)	YES	Danbury; 51.709°N 0.578°E; TL782043	EWT, NT	Map	Citation	The common is one of the largest areas of heathland left in the county, and also has bracken and gorse scrub, and woodland with oak and birch. Upper parts are on glacial gravel, and lower down there is boggy heath. This is the main British site for the rosy marbled moth.
Debden Water	Debden Water	✓		21.3 hectares (53 acres)	YES	Newport; 51.983°N 0.232°E; TL534340		Map	Citation	The flood plain of the stream has tall fen vegetation, mainly common reed, while in some areas plants such as tussock sedge and lesser pond-sedge are locally dominant. Other habitats are neutral grassland, broad-leaved woodland and species-rich calcareous grassland.
Dengie	Dengie	✓	✓	3,132.4 hectares (7,740 acres)	YES	Bradwell-on-Sea; 51.69°N 0.95°E; TM042037	EWT, GCR, NCR, NNR, Ramsar, SAC, SPA	Map	Citation	This is a large area of tidal mudflats and salt marshes. It has internationally important winter populations of brent geese and grey plovers, and nationally significant numbers of knots, dunlins and turnstones.
Elsenham Woods	Elsenham Woods	✓		44.4 hectares (110 acres)	NO	Elsenham; 51.906°N 0.268°E; TL561255		Map	Citation	The site comprises two separate areas, the larger Eastend Wood and the smaller Plegdon Wood. They are both ancient mixed woods on chalky boulder clay. There are also damp grass rides and ponds which provide additional habitats for invertebrates and birds.
Epping Forest	Epping Forest	✓		1,787.9 hectares (4,418 acres)	YES	Epping; 51.65°N 0.05°E; TQ418971	EWT, NCR, SAC, SM	Map	Citation	The site has ancient semi-natural woodland, grassland and wetland. The invertebrate fauna is described by Natural England as "of outstanding national significance", including 66 subcortical (under bark) and dead wood fauna on the IUCN Red List of Threatened Species.
Foulness	Foulness	✓		10,946.1 hectares (27,048 acres)	PP	Foulness; 51.57°N 0.92°E; TR022902	EWT, LNR, NCR, Ramsar, SAC, SPA	Map	Citation	This coastland site is of international importance for nine species of wildfowl and waders, such as dark-bellied brent geese. Rare plants include soft hornwort and spiral tasselwood, and the site is also important for invertebrates, with 71 nationally rare species.
Garnetts Wood and Barnston Lays	Garnetts Wood	✓		25.0 hectares (62 acres)	YES	Great Dunmow; 51.838°N 0.373°E; TL636182		Map	Citation	The site is coppiced woodland, mostly ancient, on glacial silt, sands, gravels and clay soils. It contains some of the best lime woodland in the county. There are two ponds, which have the unusual water purslane.
Garrold's Meadow	Garrold's Meadow	✓		5.0 hectares (12 acres)	NO	Leigh-on-Sea; 51.568°N 0.629°E; TQ823887		Map	Citation	This site is unimproved grassland on gravel in it southern part and clay in the north. There is also an area of marsh. The plant community is diverse, with a number of uncommon species. Grasses include common bent, sweet vernal grass and crested dog's-tail.
Glemsford Pits	Glemsford Pits	✓		33.2 hectares (82 acres)	PP	Glemsford; 52.085°N 0.681°E; TL838463		Map	Citation	Thirteen species of dragonfly and damselfly have been recorded in these former gravel workings, including one which is rare in Britain, the ruddy darter dragonfly. Aquatic plants include the yellow water-lily and mare's tail.
Globe Pit	Globe Pit		✓	0.4 hectares (0.99 acres)	NO	Little Thurrock; 51.479°N 0.339°E; TQ625782	GCR	Map	Citation	Natural England describes Globe Pit as "an important site for the interrelationship of archaeology with geology since it is vital in the correlation of the Lower Palaeolithic chronology with the Pleistocene Thames Terrace sequence". There are many Clactonian flint tools.
Goldsands Road Pit	Goldsands Road Pit		✓	1.2 hectares (3.0 acres)	NO	Southminster; 51.656°N 0.832°E; TQ960990	GCR	Map	Citation	This site provides the earliest evidence of an ancient course of the combined Thames and Medway rivers, which flowed north-east across eastern Essex in the late Anglian period around 400,000 years ago.
Grays Thurrock Chalk Pit	Grays Thurrock Chalk Pit	✓		17.3 hectares (43 acres)	YES	Grays; 51.486°N 0.316°E; TQ609789	EWT	Map	Citation	This former chalk pit has a range of woodland, grassland and scrub habitats which are important for invertebrates. Beetles include two species on the IUCN Red List of Threatened Species, Mordellistena humeralis and Mordellistena neuwaldeggiana.
Great Wood and Dodd's Grove	Great Wood	✓		37.1 hectares (92 acres)	YES	Leigh-on-Sea; 51.559°N 0.623°E; TQ819877	EWT, LNR	Map	Citation	This is a small remnant of the ancient Hadleigh Great Wood. It is coppiced oak woodland on sands, gravels and clay, and one of the largest areas of old woodland in the south of the county. Plants include the rare broad-leaved helleborine.
Hainault Forest	Hainault Forest	✓		135.3 hectares (334 acres)	YES	Lambourne; 51.623°N 0.134°E; TQ478937		Map	Citation	The woodland and scrub in this country park have varied flora and fauna, including diverse breeding birds. The shrub layer has plants such as wood sorrel and butcher's-broom, and birds include wood warblers and spotted flycatchers.
Hales and Shadwell Woods	Shadwell Wood	✓		15.4 hectares (38 acres)	PP	Saffron Walden; 52.043°N 0.291°E; TL572408	EWT, NCR, NNR	Map	Citation	The woods are ancient coppice wet ash and maple on chalky boulder clay. The shrub layer is diverse, with plants including the wayfaring-tree and the nationally uncommon oxlip. Seven species of orchid have been recorded in Shadwell Wood, which also has herb-rich grassy rides.
Hall's Quarry	Hall's Quarry		✓	0.7 hectares (1.7 acres)	NO	Elsenham; 51.929°N 0.206°E; TL518279	GCR	Map	Citation	The site exposes glacial gravels, silts and tills deposited during the Anglian ice age around 450,000 years ago. It is described by Natural England as "extremely important for the study of the Anglian glaciation and its associated deposits".
Hamford Water	Hamford Water	✓		2,188.6 hectares (5,408 acres)	PP	Walton-on-the-Naze; 51.88°N 1.24°E; TM230253	EWT, NCR, NNR, Ramsar, SPA	Map	Citation	The site is a tidal inlet which has marsh grasslands, creeks, mud and sand flats, salt marshes, islands and beaches. It is internationally significant for breeding little terns and wintering dark-bellied brent geese. Rare plants include hog's fennel and slender hare's-ear.
Hangman's Wood and Deneholes	Denehole	✓		5.2 hectares (13 acres)	YES	Little Thurrock; 51.489°N 0.346°E; TQ630793	SM	Map	Citation	The deneholes, which were created by medieval chalk mining, are the most important underground hibernation sites for bats in Essex, with three species; Brown long-eared bat, Natterer's bat and Daubenton's bat. The oak woodland is ancient, and it provides a feeding habitat for the bats.
Hanningfield Reservoir	Hanningfield Reservoir	✓		402.9 hectares (996 acres)	YES	Chelmsford; 51.656°N 0.501°E; TQ731982	BSO, EWT	Map	Citation	The reservoir has a nationally important population of gadwalls, and it also has significant numbers of pochards, teal, tufted ducks and pintails. The chalk sludge lagoon has several unusual plants, and there is a rare moss Brachythecium mildeanum at the foot of the southern dam.
Harlow Woods	Harlow Woods	✓		45.2 hectares (112 acres)	YES	Harlow; 51.74°N 0.084°E; TL440066	LNR	Map	Citation	The woods are mainly pedunculate oak and hornbeam, and other trees include ash, hazel and birch. There are also some elms which are regenerating from coppice following Dutch elm disease.
Harwich Foreshore	Harwich Foreshore		✓	10.3 hectares (25 acres)	YES	Harwich; 51.940°N 1.291°E; TM263320	GCR	Map	Citation	This site exposes bands of ash from explosive volcanoes in Scotland during the Eocene epoch around 50 million years ago. It also has many London Clay fossils from the Eocene rainforest, including mammals such as Hyracotherium, the earliest ancestor of the horse.
Hatfield Forest	Hatfield Forest	✓		410.8 hectares (1,015 acres)	YES	Bishop's Stortford; 51.856°N 0.227°E; TL535198	NCR, NNR, NT, SM,	Map	Citation	This is the last Royal Forest to remain nearly intact. It has ancient coppice woodland, scrub, unimproved grassland, a large lake and extensive marshes. The woodland is mainly wet ash and maple. There are many rare plants and over sixty bird species.
High Wood, Dunmow	Gatehouse at High Wood, Dunmow	✓		41.5 hectares (103 acres)	NO	Great Dunmow; 51.873°N 0.327°E; TL603219		Map	Citation	The site on boulder clay and loess has areas of wet ash and maple woodland, and others of pedunculate oak and hornbeam. Some areas are ancient woodland. There is a diverse layer of ground flora, and damp woodland rides provide additional habitat for birds and invertebrates.
Hockley Woods	Hockley Woods	✓		92.1 hectares (228 acres)	YES	Hockley; 51.594°N 0.643°E; TQ832917	LNR	Map	Citation	The woods are on pre-glacial gravels and clay, with trees including hornbeam, pedunculate oak, sessile oak, birch and hazel. Ground flora include three species of orchid, and there is a stream and area of bog.
Holehaven Creek	Holehaven Creek	✓		272.8 hectares (674 acres)	YES	Canvey Island; 51.522°N 0.525°E; TQ753834		Map	Citation	The creek's intertidal marshes and mudflats support nationally important (and occasionally internationally) numbers of wintering black-tailed godwits. Curlews and dunlins are also sometimes present in nationally significant numbers.
Holland Haven Marshes	Holland Haven Marshes	✓		210.6 hectares (520 acres)	PP	Clacton-on-Sea; 51.816°N 1.208°E; TM212179	LNR	Map	Citation	A network of ditches radiates from Holland Brook. These ditches have several nationally scarce aquatic plant species, such as brackish water crowfoot and divided sedge. There are also rare invertebrates, including one on the IUCN Red List of Threatened Species, the soldier fly Stratiomys singularior.
Holland-on-Sea Cliff	Holland-on-Sea Cliff		✓	0.1 hectares (0.25 acres)	YES	Clacton-on-Sea; 51.804°N 1.206°E; TM211166	GCR	Map	Citation	This is the type site for the "Lower Holland Gravel", which was laid down by the River Thames before the river was diverted south during the Anglian glaciation around 450,000 years ago, and also for the "Upper Thames Gravel", which was deposited when the Thames was blocked by ice.
Hunsdon Mead	Hunsdon Mead	✓		34.2 hectares (85 acres)	YES	Harlow; 51.779°N 0.054°E; TL418109	EWT, HMWT	Map	Citation	This is unimproved grassland which is subject to winter flooding. Notable grass species include meadow brome and the quaking grass Briza media, and there are other unusual flora such as pepper saxifrage and green-winged orchid.
Inner Thames Marshes	Inner Thames Marshes	✓		485.9 hectares (1,201 acres)	YES	Purfleet; 51.500°N 0.204°E; TQ531802	RSPB	Map	Citation	The marshes have a diverse bird population, including internationally important numbers of wintering teal. There are nationally scarce invertebrates such as the water beetles agabus conspersus and haliplus apicalis, the scarce emerald damselfly, and the meniscus midge dixella attica.
Lion Pit	Lion Pit		✓	2.4 hectares (5.9 acres)	YES	Grays; 51.479°N 0.298°E; TQ597781	EWT, GCR	Map	Citation	Evidence has been found on this site of flint-knapping using the Levallois technique by Neanderthals 200,000 years ago, and it has even been possible to fit back together some of the flint flakes. Fossils have been found of mammals including, rhinoceros, bison, mammoth and straight-tusked elephant.
Little Hallingbury Marsh	Little Hallingbury Marsh	✓		4.5 hectares (11 acres)	NO	Little Hallingbury; 51.833°N 0.162°E; TL491171		Map	Citation	The site is unimproved wet grassland and fen, which contains uncommon and declining swamp plant species. The site is also of interest for overwintering birds and aquatic insects, especially dragonflies.
Little Oakley Channel Deposit	Little Oakley Channel Deposit		✓	3.0 hectares (7.4 acres)	NO	Little Oakley; 51.921°N 1.231°E; TM223296	GCR	Map	Citation	This site exposed a former channel of the River Thames during an interglacial period around 575,000 years ago. Many fossils were found, including rhinoceros and an extensive pollen record, allowing geologists to reconstruct the fauna and flora.
Lofts Farm Pit	Lofts Farm Pit		✓	5.0 hectares (12 acres)	NO	Maldon; 51.75°N 0.699°E; TL864091	GCR	Map	Citation	Many fossils have been found dating to the last Ice Age, 110,000 to 12,000 years ago. Finds included reindeer, woolly mammoth and woolly rhinoceros. The site is in the "Blackwater Terrace Gravel", dating to a time when the River Blackwater was a tributary of the Thames-Medway River.
Maldon Cutting	Maldon Cutting		✓	0.2 hectares (0.49 acres)	NO	Maldon; 51.729°N 0.664°E; TL841067	GCR	Map	Citation	The site is a former railway cutting which is the type locality for the Maldon Till, which dates to the Pleistocene ice age. It was previously thought to represent a separate advance of the ice sheet, but in the light of later work it was concluded that it is an outlier of the till which covers much of central and northern Essex.
Marks Tey Brickpit	Marks Tey Brickpit		✓	29.8 hectares (74 acres)	NO	Marks Tey; 51.883°N 0.775°E; TL911242	GCR	Map	Citation	This site has a record of pollen throughout the Hoxnian interglacial around 400,000 years ago, and this is the best vegetational record for any British interglacial site. Seasonal layers in lake sediments have made it possible to estimate the duration of the Hoxnian.
Mill Meadows, Billericay	Mill Meadows	✓		6.8 hectares (17 acres)	YES	Billericay; 51.621°N 0.427°E; TQ681941	LNR	Map	Citation	Five sloping fields on London Clay are separated by old hedge lines. Some areas are wet, and the main grasses are red fescue and common bent. Flowers include harebell and common spotted orchid, and there are herbs such as pignut.
Mucking Flats and Marshes	Mucking Flats	✓		312.7 hectares (773 acres)	PP	Tilbury; 51.485°N 0.444°E; TQ698791	Ramsar, SPA	Map	Citation	Wildfowl and waders feed and roost on the mudflats and marshes, with internationally important numbers of ringed plover, and nationally significant shelducks, grey plovers, dunlins, black-tailed godwits and redshanks.
The Naze	The Naze		✓	24.9 hectares (62 acres)	YES	Walton-on-the-Naze; 51.865°N 1.290°E; TM266236	GCR	Map	Citation	This is the type site for the Waltonian, the first British stage of the Pleistocene. It also has many plant and bird fossils dating to the Eocene, and it is described by Natural England as important in the study of avian evolution.
Newney Green Pit	Newney Green Pit		✓	0.1 hectares (0.25 acres)	NO	Writtle; 51.732°N 0.385°E; TL648064	GCR	Map	Citation	This former quarry exposed the Kesgrave (Thames) Gravel, dating to the Cromerian interglacial around 500,000 years ago. Higher layers displayed the transition from this warm period to the succeeding severe Anglian ice age.
Norsey Wood	Norsey Wood	✓		65.6 hectares (162 acres)	YES	Billericay; 51.632°N 0.436°E; TQ687954	LNR, SM	Map	Citation	This is ancient oak woodland on acid soil which has been converted to mixed sweet chestnut coppice. There are sphagnum mosses in acidic flushes, and the rare water violet in one of the four ponds. There are nine species of dragonfly. Archaeological features include a Bronze Age bowl barrow.
Nunn Wood	Nunn Wood	✓		9.5 hectares (23 acres)	YES	Saffron Walden; 52.062°N 0.277°E; TL562429		Map	Citation	The site is an ancient coppice wood on chalky boulder clay. It is mainly hornbeam with other trees such as pedunculate oak, ash and field maple. Flowers include the nationally uncommon oxlip, and one of the largest colonies of early purple orchids.
Pitsea Marsh	Pitsea Marsh	✓		92.3 hectares (228 acres)	PP	Pitsea; 51.551°N 0.507°E; TQ739866		Map	Citation	The site has a variety of habitats, such as grassland, scrub, reedbed, fen, ponds and saltmarsh. Dykes and ponds support the scarce emerald damselfly, and other rare invertebrates include Roesel's bush-cricket and the hoverfly xanthandrus comtus.
Purfleet Chalk Pits	Purfleet Chalk Pits		✓	9.8 hectares (24 acres)	PP	Purfleet; 51.483°N 0.25°E; TQ563784	GCR	Map	Citation	The chalk pits expose sands and gravels which are associated with the ancient course of the River Thames. The site has been occupied by early humans at several different periods, and MIS9, between about 335,000 and 280,000 years ago, is often informally called the Purfleet interglacial.
Purfleet Road, Aveley	Purfleet Road, Aveley		✓	4.0 hectares (9.9 acres)	YES	Aveley; 51.496°N 0.239°E; TQ555798		Map	Citation	This site dates to the interglacial period, MIS7, around 200,000 years ago. It has yielded mollusc insect and mammal fossils, including the first jungle cat discovered in Britain.
Quendon Wood	Quendon Wood	✓		33.5 hectares (83 acres)	PP	Stansted Mountfitchet; 51.946°N 0.205°E; TL516298		Map	Citation	The site has ancient coppiced woods with a rich variety of fauna on different types of soil. It is mainly pedunculate oak/hornbeam woodland, with some areas having ash/maple, and others the rare birch/hazel variant. Plants in the understorey include wild daffodils and herb-paris.
Riddles Wood	Riddles Wood	✓		37.9 hectares (94 acres)	NO	Clacton-on-Sea; 51.820°N 1.088°E; TM129180		Map	Citation	The site has varied ancient pedunculate oak and hazel in some areas and oak and hornbeam in others, as well as chestnut coppice. The soils are glacial gravels in the west and London Clay in the east. Flower include the rare orpine.
River Ter	River Ter		✓	6.4 hectares (16 acres)	PP	Great Leighs; 51.813°N 0.18°E; TL737157	GCR	Map	Citation	The site is a stretch of the River Ter and its banks which is representative of a type of lowland stream on glacial till, with a low base flow but high flood peaks, and other features such as pool-riffle sequences and bank erosion.
Roding Valley Meadows	Roding Valley Meadows	✓		19.3 hectares (48 acres)	YES	Chigwell; 51.638°N 0.074°E; TQ436953	EWT, LNR	Map	Citation	The meadows are bordered to the south west by the River Roding. They form one of the largest areas of grassland in Essex which are traditionally managed as hay meadows, flood meadows and marshland. Plants include the largest beds in Essex of the rare brown sedge.
Roman River	Roman River	✓		282.0 hectares (697 acres)	YES	Colchester; 51.849°N 0.904°E; TM001207		Map	Citation	There are areas of woodland, grassland, fen, scrub and heath. The woodland, which is mainly ancient, has over a thousand species of moths and butterflies, and nearly seventy of breeding birds, including hawfinches, tree pipits and yellow wagtails.
Sandbeach Meadows	Sandbeach Meadows	✓		29.4 hectares (73 acres)	FP	Bradwell-on-Sea; 51.709°N 0.924°E; TM021052		Map	Citation	The site is almost the only survivor of the formerly extensive Dengie grazing marshes, and in the winter it supports a nationally important population of dark-bellied brent geese. Several ditches have meanders which survive from when they were salt-marsh creeks.
St Osyth Pit	St Osyth Pit		✓	0.1 hectares (0.25 acres)	NO	St Osyth; 51.811°N 1.073°E; TM119170	GCR	Map	Citation	The site has a succession of deposits which throw light of the diversion of the River Thames south to its present course during the Anglian Ice Age around 450,000 years ago, including fine gravel deposited during a brief period when the Thames was blocked by ice.
Stour and Copperas Woods, Ramsey	Copperas Wood	✓		78.2 hectares (193 acres)	YES	Wrabness; 51.937°N 1.189°E; TM193313	EWT, RSPB, SAONB, WT	Map	Citation	The site is ancient coppiced woodland on the southern shore of Stour Estuary, and is the only area in the county where woodland and coastal habitats meet. The dominant tree is chestnut, with a ground layer of bramble. Other plants include yellow archangel and dog's mercury.
Stour Estuary	Stour Estuary	✓	✓	2,248.0 hectares (5,555 acres)	PP	Wrabness; 51.95°N 1.16°E; TM173327	EWT, GCR, LNR, NCR, Ramsar, RSPB, SAONB, SPA	Map	Citation	The estuary is nationally important for thirteen species of wintering wildfowl and three on autumn passage, and also for coastal saltmarsh, sheltered muddy shores, two scarce marine invertebrates, rare plant assemblages and three geological sites.
Thorndon Park	Thorndon Park	✓		148.5 hectares (367 acres)	YES	Brentwood; 51.596°N 0.324°E; TQ611911		Map	Citation	The site is semi-natural woodland and ancient parkland. It has a diverse population of beetles, including one which is rare and threatened in Britain. The parkland has old oak pollards on acid or neutral grassland.
Thrift Wood, Woodham Ferrers	Thrift Wood	✓		19.5 hectares (48 acres)	YES	Bicknacre; 51.686°N 0.59°E; TL791018	EWT	Map	Citation	The site is an ancient semi-natural wood on acid soil. Wild service trees and elders are found in the shrub layer, and a pond has a raised sphagnum bog. Twenty species of butterfly have been recorded.
Thundersley Great Common	Thundersley Great Common	✓		9.0 hectares (22 acres)	YES	Thundersley; 51.574°N 0.589°E; TQ795893		Map	Citation	The site is in two separate areas, and has a variety of grass and heath habitats. There is wet and dry heathland, both unusual in Essex, locally uncommon plants. Ponds which dry up in the summer provide an additional habitat.
Tiptree Heath	Tiptree Heath	✓		24.6 hectares (61 acres)	YES	Tiptree; 51.798°N 0.728°E; TL882146	EWT	Map	Citation	This is the largest surviving area of heathland in Essex, and has a number of plants rare in the county. It is dominated by heather and bent grass. A small herd of Dexter cattle help to control the growth of invasive scrub.
Turnford and Cheshunt Pits	Cheshunt Pit	✓		174.4 hectares (431 acres)	YES	Waltham Abbey; 51.706°N 0.019°W; TL370027	SPA	Map	Citation	This site includes ten former gravel pits, which are of national importance for wintering gadwalls and shovelers. It is also valuable for invertebrates, especially grasshoppers and bush-crickets.
Upper Colne Marshes	Upper Colne Marshes	✓		113.2 hectares (280 acres)	PP	Wivenhoe; 51.857°N 0.954°E; TM035217		Map	Citation	The site has grazing marshes, salt tidal marshes, beaches, sea walls and intertidal mud. It has an important assemblage of nationally scarce plants and diverse ditch types. Insects include the nationally scarce Roesel's bush-cricket.
Vange and Fobbing Marshes	Vange Marsh	✓		167.3 hectares (413 acres)	YES	Basildon; 51.532°N 0.491°E; TQ729844 TQ725867	RSPB	Map	Citation	The marshes are unimproved coastal grassland, dykes and creeks, with a wide variety of maritime herbs and grasses, some of them nationally rare. The site is the main British location for least lettuce. Insects with restricted distributions include the scarce emerald damselfly.
Waltham Abbey	Waltham Abbey	✓		33.8 hectares (84 acres)	YES	Waltham Abbey; 51.699°N 0.012°W; TL375019		Map	Citation	The site is alder woodland on damp soils, with other trees including sycamore, ash and crack willow. The trees were planted around 1700 to provide charcoal for the manufacture of gunpowder, and planting ceased at the time of the First World War.
Weeleyhall Wood	Weeleyhall Wood	✓		31.6 hectares (78 acres)	YES	Weeley; 51.845°N 1.132°E; TM158209	EWT	Map	Citation	It has a variety of woodland types, reflecting diverse soils. It is mainly pedunculate oak over a layer of coppice hazel and sweet chestnut planted in the nineteenth century. There are two ponds and species-rich damp, grassy rides.
West Thurrock Lagoon and Marshes	West Thurrock Marshes	✓		66.5 hectares (164 acres)	PP	West Thurrock; 51.464°N 0.276°E; TQ582763		Map	Citation	The site is important for wintering waders and wildfowl which feed on the mudflats. Reed warblers and bearded tits breed on reed beds in the lagoon, and teals and grey herons roost on the shallow waters and grassy islands.
West Wood, Little Sampford	West Wood	✓		23.9 hectares (59 acres)	YES	Thaxted; 51.974°N 0.357°E; TL620332	EWT	Map	Citation	The site is ancient woodland on chalky boulder clay and sandy loam. There is a rich variety of plants in wetter areas, such as oxlip and meadow-sweet. There are many species of birds and butterflies, and four ponds which have great crested newts, dragonflies and damselflies.
Wivenhoe Gravel Pit	Wivenhoe Gravel Pit		✓	1.0 hectare (2.5 acres)	YES	Wivenhoe; 51.872°N 0.977°E; TM050235	GCR	Map	Citation	The site is the type locality for the Wivenhoe Gravel, which was laid down by the River Thames before it was diverted south to its present course by the Anglian glaciation around 450,000 years ago. The site is important for establishing the previous course of the Thames.
Woodham Walter Common	Woodham Walter Common	✓		79.7 hectares (197 acres)	YES	Danbury; 51.729°N 0.590°E; TL790065	EWT	Map	Citation	The site is on glacial sand and gravel over London Clay. it has a number of areas of oak and hornbeam woodland on former heathland. It also has two botanically rich valleys, each of which has a stream along it.

== See also ==
- List of Local Nature Reserves in Essex
- Essex Wildlife Trust
