= MAZ =

Maz or MAZ may refer to:

- IATA code for Eugenio María de Hostos Airport, Mayagüez, Puerto Rico
- Minsk Automobile Plant, abbreviated in Belarusian as MAZ
- Myc-associated zinc finger protein, a protein encoded by the MAZ gene
- Maz, a village in Iran
- Mammalian assemblage zone, a collection of fossil mammal bones
- Maz Kanata, a former space pirate in the sequel era of the Star Wars universe
- Bill "Maz" Mazeroski, American baseball player
