= Purfleet Chalk Pits =

Site of Special Scientific Interest in Purfleet in Essex

Coordinates: 51.483°N 0.25°E

- Site of Special Scientific Interest
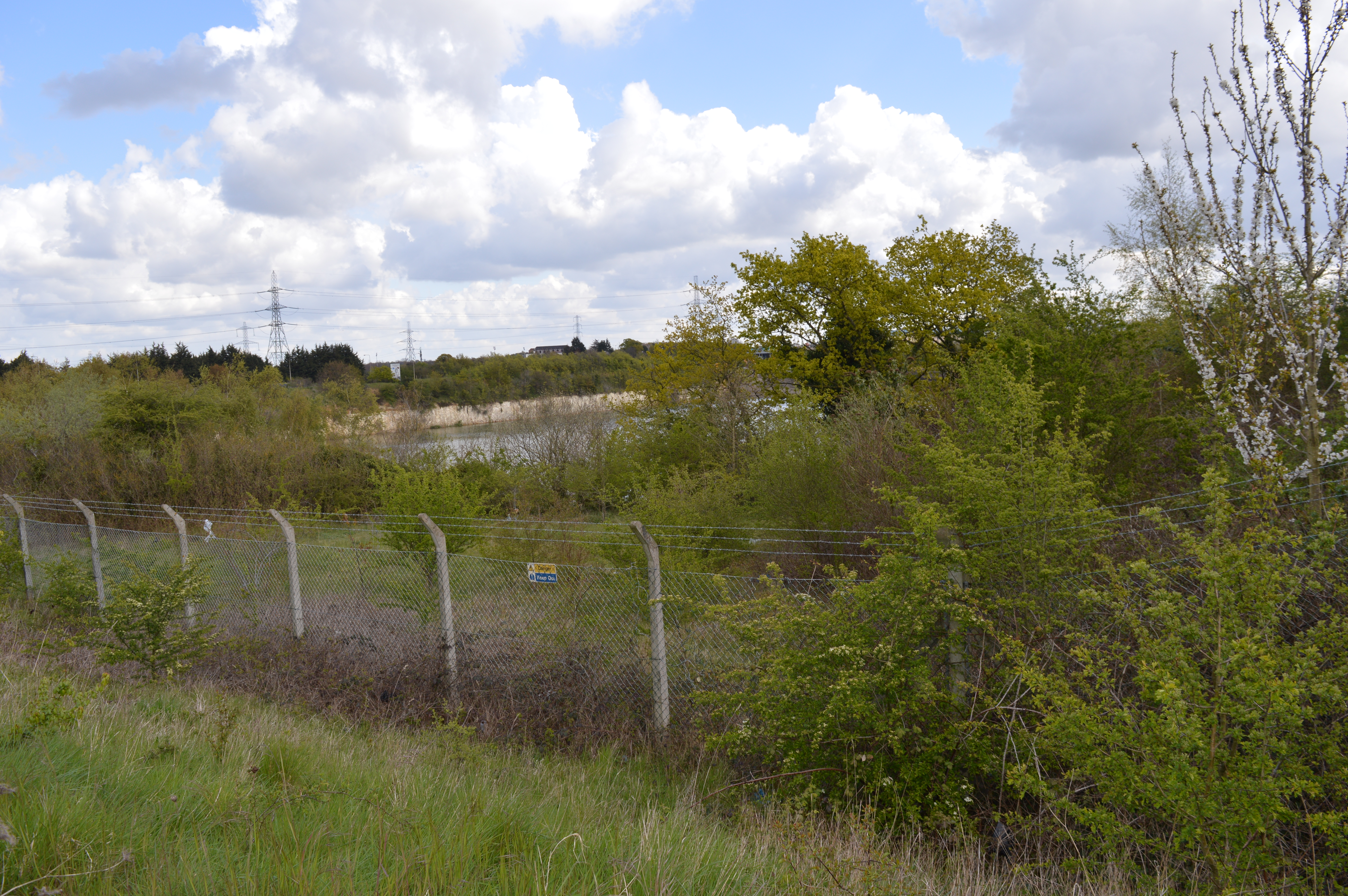
- Location of Purfleet Chalk Pits.
- Area of search: Essex
- Grid reference: TQ560784; TQ563785; TQ566785; TQ 569 786
- Interest: Geological
- Area: 10.7 ha (26 acres)
- Notification date: 1986
- Location map: Magic Map

Purfleet Chalk Pits is a 10.7-hectare (26-acre) geological Site of Special Scientific Interest in Purfleet in Essex. It is a Geological Conservation Review site.

The chalk pits expose sands and gravels which are associated with the ancient course of the River Thames. They have yielded varied animal, mollusc and plants remains which throw light on the environmental and fluvial conditions at the time when they were deposited. The site is over 280,000 years old, and laid down when this section of the Thames was flowing westwards. There also broken flints in several layers, showing occupation by early humans at several different periods. MIS9, between about 335,000 and 280,000 years ago, is often informally called the Purfleet interglacial, and the mammalian assemblage on the site is the type for the Purfleet Mammalian assemblage zone.

The site consists of Greenlands Quarry, Bluelands Quarry, Botany Pit and Esso Pit. Most of it has been filled in and is covered by a housing estate. A section of Greenlands Quarry has been created for research, but this is closed to the public.
