= Garrold's Meadow =

Protected area in Essex, England

Coordinates: 51.568°N 0.629°E

- Site of Special Scientific Interest
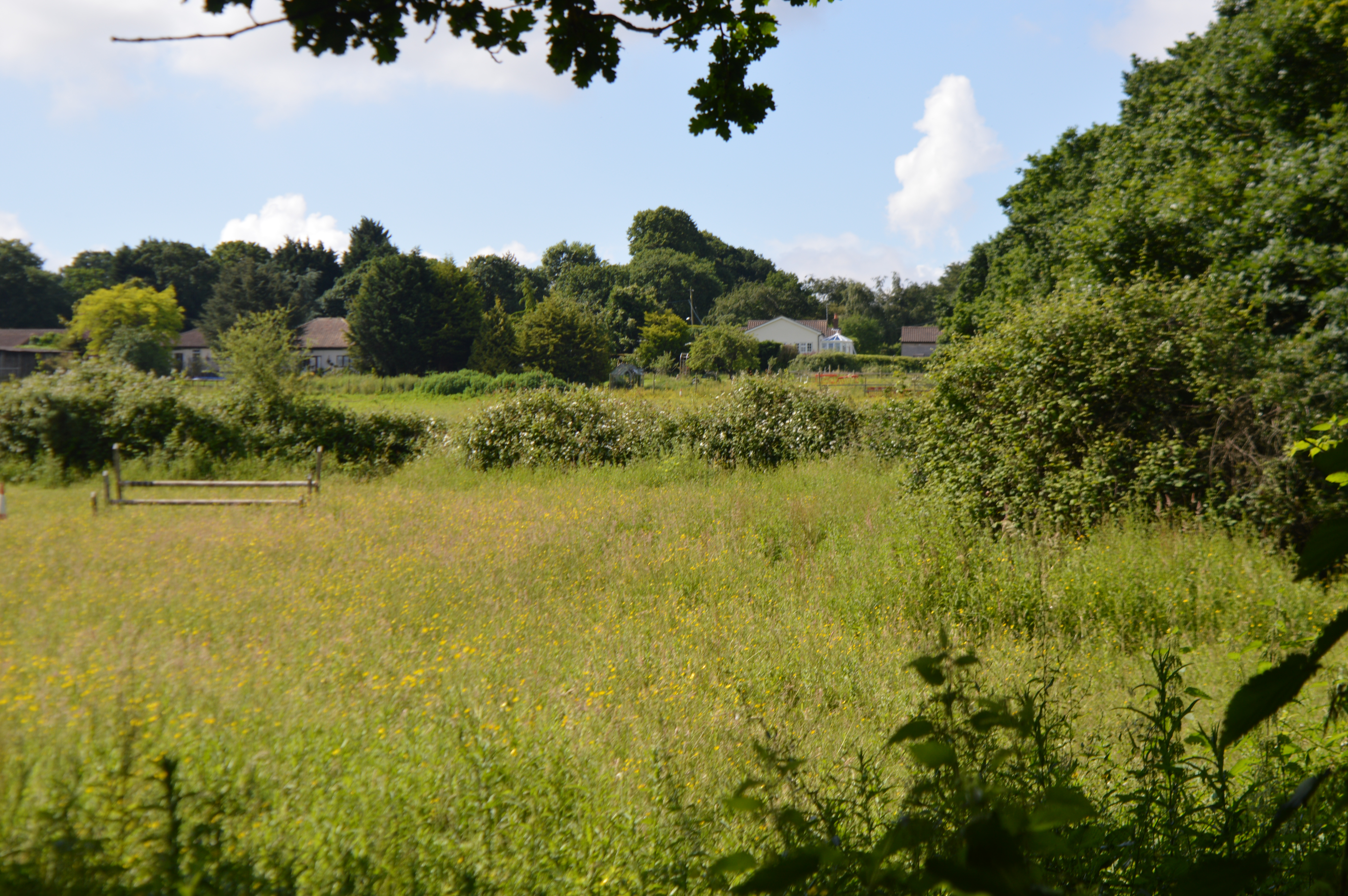
- Location of Garrold's Meadow.
- Area of search: Essex
- Grid reference: TQ 823888
- Interest: Biological
- Area: 5.0 ha (12 acres)
- Notification date: 1988
- Location map: Magic Map

Garrold's Meadow is a 5 hectare biological Site of Special Scientific Interest north of Leigh-on-Sea in Essex. The local planning authority is Castle Point Borough Council.

This site is unimproved grassland on gravel in it southern part and clay in the north. There is also an area of marsh. The plant community is diverse, with a number of uncommon species. Grasses include common bent, sweet vernal grass and crested dog's-tail.

There is no public access but the site can be viewed from Eastwood Old Road.
