= Purfleet Road, Aveley =

Protected area in Essex, England

Coordinates: 51.497°N 0.239°E

- Site of Special Scientific Interest
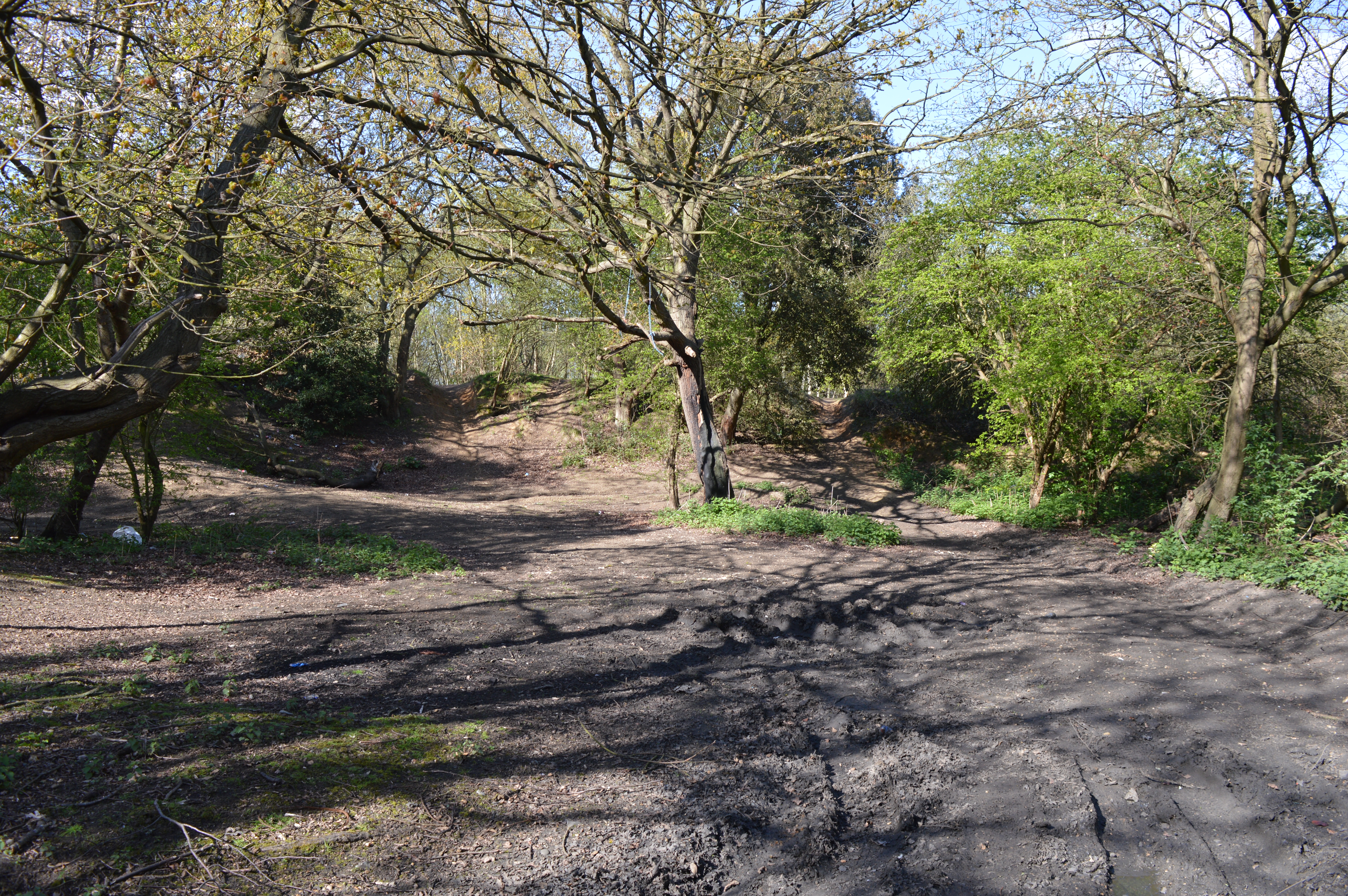
- Location of Purfleet Road, Aveley.
- Area of search: Essex
- Grid reference: TQ556799
- Interest: Geological
- Area: 4.0 ha (9.9 acres)
- Notification date: 1998
- Location map: Magic Map

Purfleet Road, Aveley is a 4 hectare geological Site of Special Scientific Interest in Aveley in Essex.

The site was exposed as a result of excavations for building the A13 road in 1997. It dates to the interglacial period, MIS7, around 200,000 years ago. The site has yielded mollusc insect and mammal fossils, including the first jungle cat discovered in Britain. It is described by Natural England as a "site of national importance for the study of Quaternary environments and climates".

There is access to the site from Purfleet Road, but no geology is visible as the excavations have been filled in.
