= Newney Green Pit =

Protected area in Essex, England

Coordinates: 51.732°N 0.385°E

- Site of Special Scientific Interest
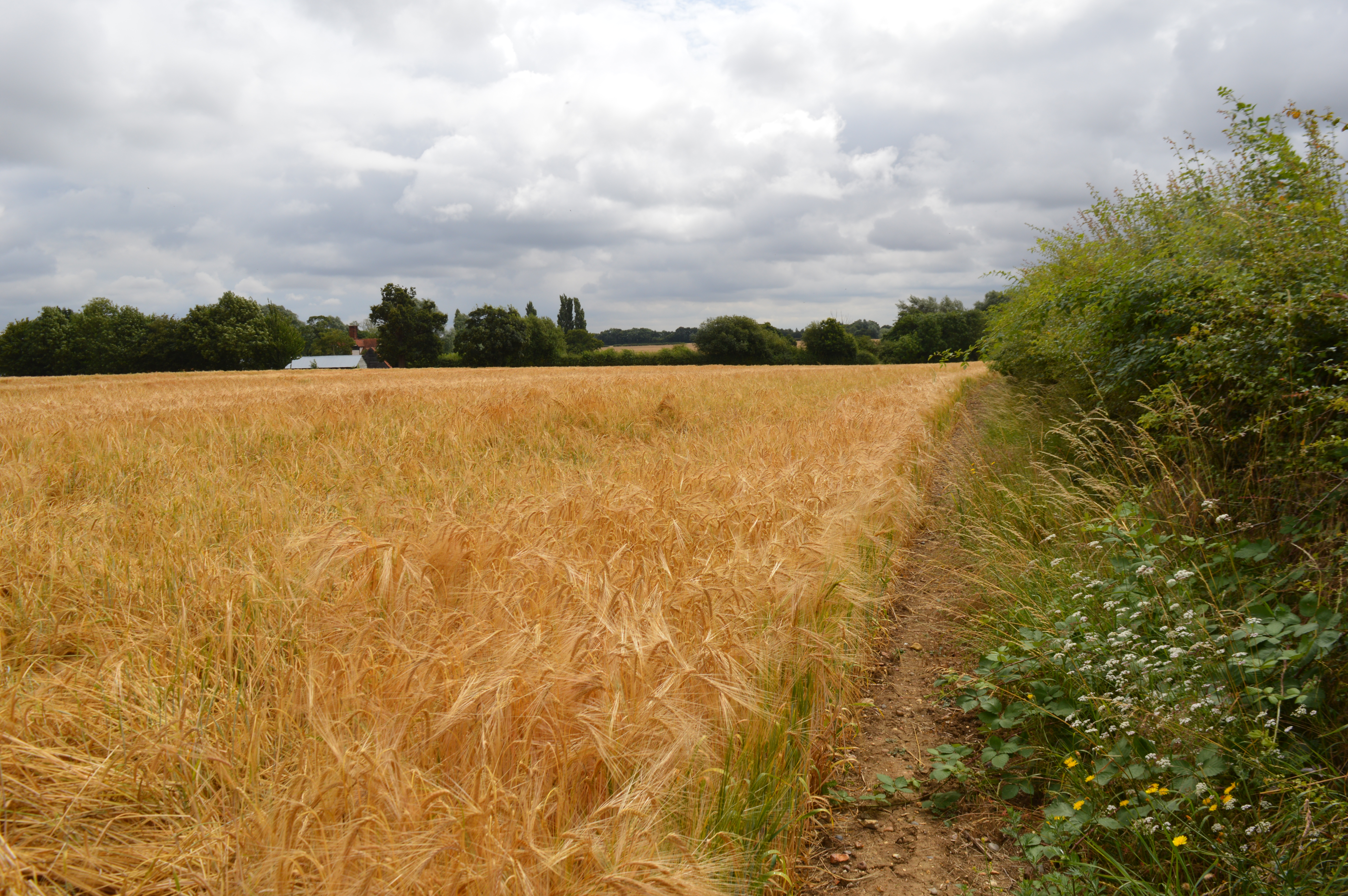
- Location of Newney Green Pit.
- Area of search: Essex
- Grid reference: TL 648065
- Interest: Geological
- Area: 0.07 ha (0.17 acres)
- Notification date: 1989
- Location map: Magic Map

Newney Green Pit is a 0.07-hectare (0.17-acre) geological Site of Special Scientific Interest west of Writtle in Essex. It is a Geological Conservation Review site.

This former quarry exposed the Kesgrave (Thames) Gravel, first recognised in Suffolk, dating to the Cromerian interglacial around 500,000 years ago. This preceded the severe Anglian ice age, which is also seen, marking the transition to glacial conditions. The site is described by Natural England as "of prime importance for the correlation between Pleistocene stratigraphic sites in the Thames and East Anglian areas". Ice wedge polygons just below the Anglian layer reveal very cold conditions just before the advance of the ice sheet across East Anglia.

The site has now been filled in and is part of a field.
