= Quendon Wood =

Woodland in Essex, England

Coordinates: 51.945°N 0.204°E

- Site of Special Scientific Interest
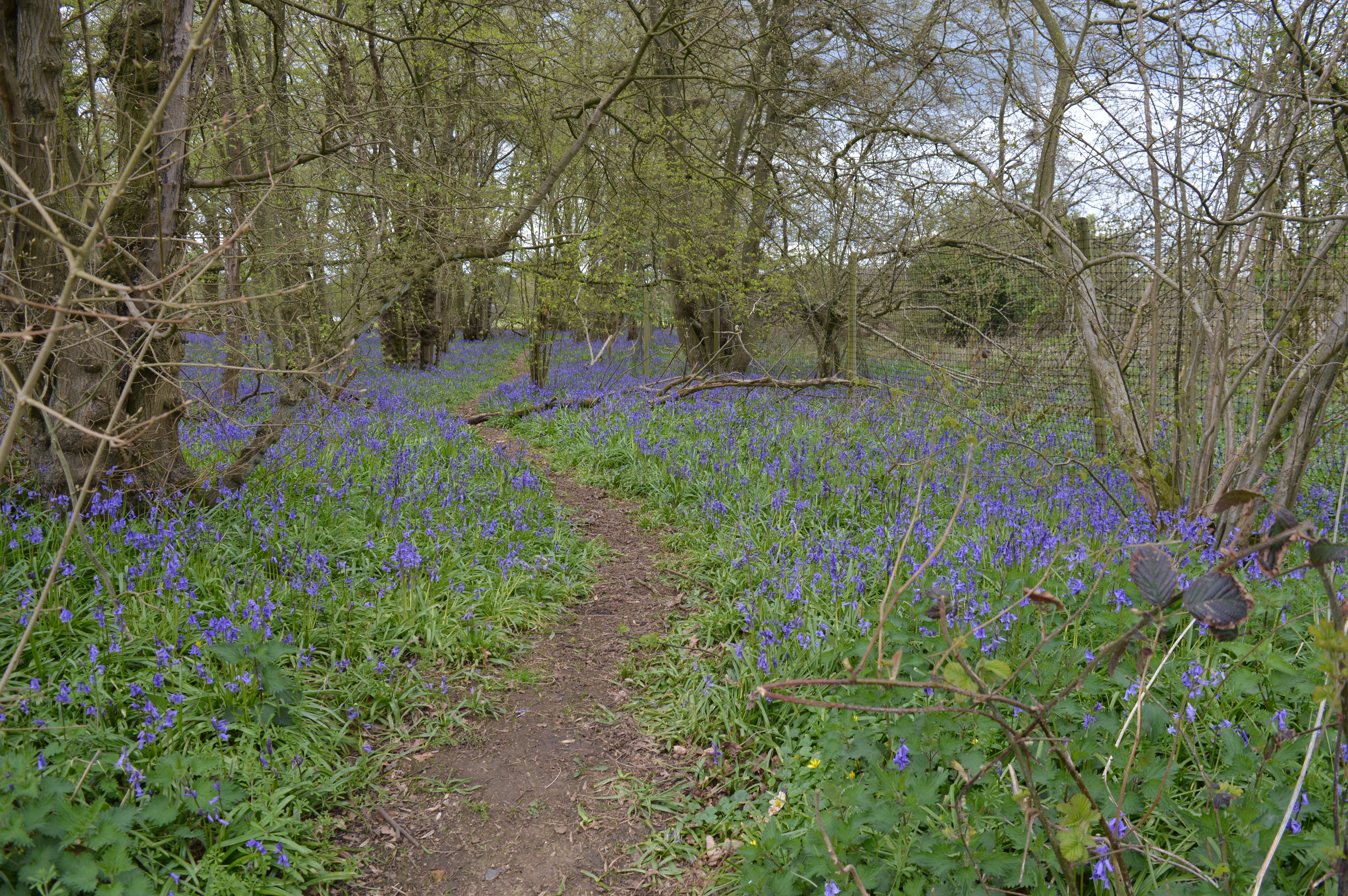
- Location of Quendon Wood.
- Area of search: Essex
- Grid reference: TL515298
- Interest: Biological
- Area: 32.1 ha (79 acres)
- Notification date: 1986
- Location map: Magic Map

Quendon Wood is a 32.1-hectare (79-acre) biological Site of Special Scientific Interest in Quendon in Essex.

The site is ancient coppiced woodland with a rich variety of fauna on different types of soil. It is mainly pedunculate oak and hornbeam, with some areas having ash and maple, and others the rare birch and hazel. Plants in the understorey include bluebells, wild daffodils and herb-paris.

Some parts are private with no public access, and there are extensive areas of tree felling.
