= St Osyth Pit =

0.1-hectare geological site in Essex

Coordinates: 51.811°N 1.073°E

- Site of Special Scientific Interest
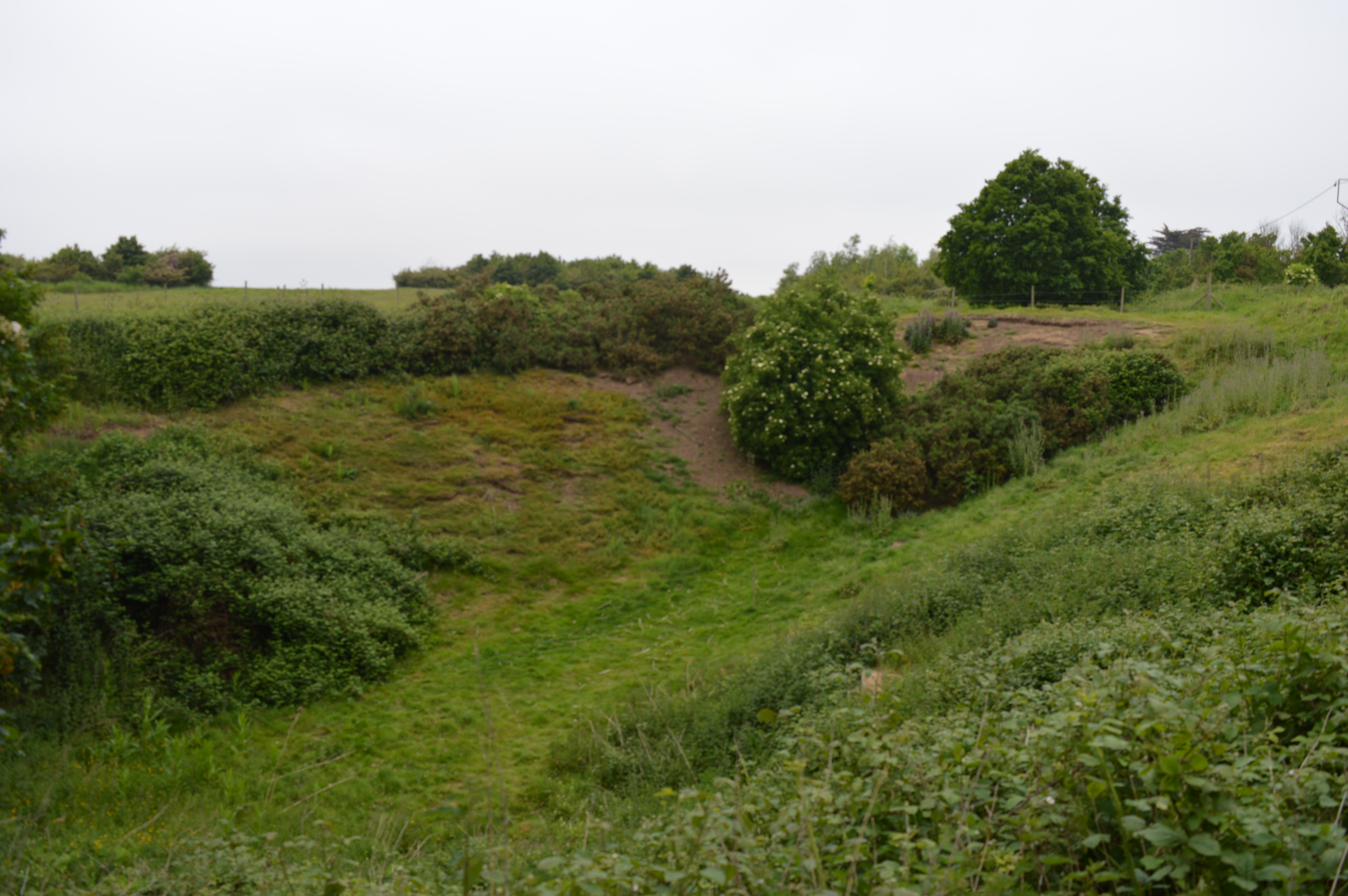
- Location of St Osyth Pit.
- Area of search: Essex
- Grid reference: TM 119170
- Interest: Geological
- Area: 0.1 ha (0.25 acres)
- Notification date: 1987
- Location map: Magic Map

St Osyth Pit is a 0.1-hectare (0.25-acre) geological Site of Special Scientific Interest north of St Osyth in Essex. It is a Geological Conservation Review site.

The site has a succession of deposits which throw light of the diversion of the River Thames south to its present course during the Anglian Ice Age around 450,000 years ago. The lower level has gravel deposited by the Thames when it flowed through the area before the ice age. This is overlain by sand and very fine gravel deposited by outwash during a brief period when the Thames was blocked by ice.

The site is private land with no public access.
