= Clacton Cliffs and Foreshore =

Protected area in Essex, England

Coordinates: 51.778°N 1.125°E

- Site of Special Scientific Interest
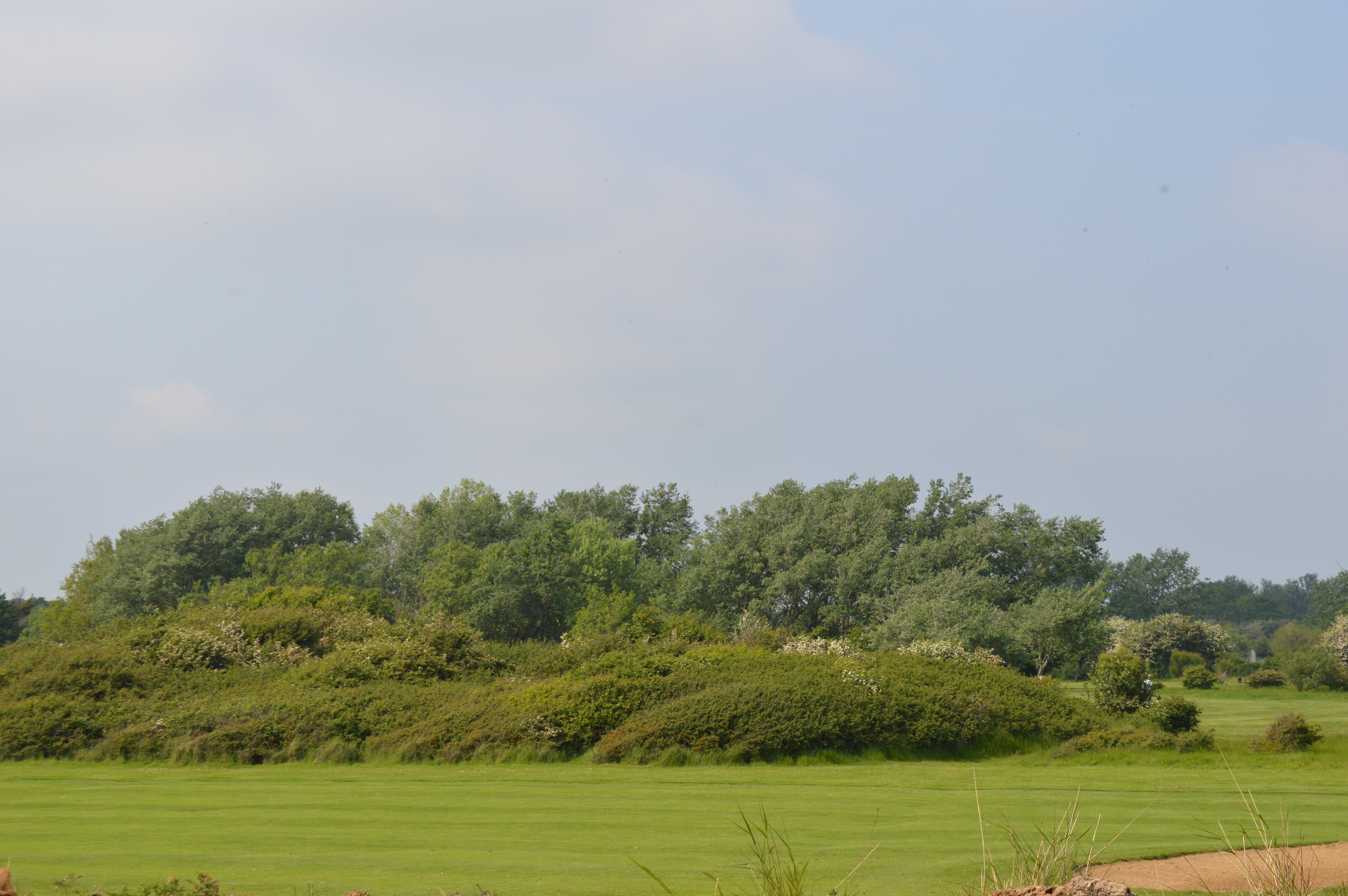
- The site in Clacton Golf Course
- Location of Clacton Cliffs and Foreshore.
- Area of search: Essex
- Grid reference: TM 146128; TM 156134; TM 173142
- Interest: Geological
- Area: 26.1 ha (64 acres)
- Notification date: 1986
- Location map: Magic Map

Clacton Cliffs and Foreshore is a 26.1-hectare (64-acre) geological Site of Special Scientific Interest in Clacton-on-Sea in Essex. It is a Geological Conservation Review site.

This site is described by Natural England as "one of the most important Pleistocene interglacial deposits in Britain". It dates to the warm Hoxnian Stage around 400,000 years ago. Flint tools found there in the early twentieth century have made it the type site for the Clactonian, a core-and-flake industry of homo erectus, although paleontologists disagree whether it is really a separate industry from the Acheulian.

The site is in three separate areas. Two are on the shoreline footpath, but no geology is visible. The third is in the south-west corner of Clacton Golf Course, and there is no public access.
