= Holland-on-Sea Cliff =

Protected area in Essex, England

Coordinates: 51.804°N 1.206°E

- Site of Special Scientific Interest
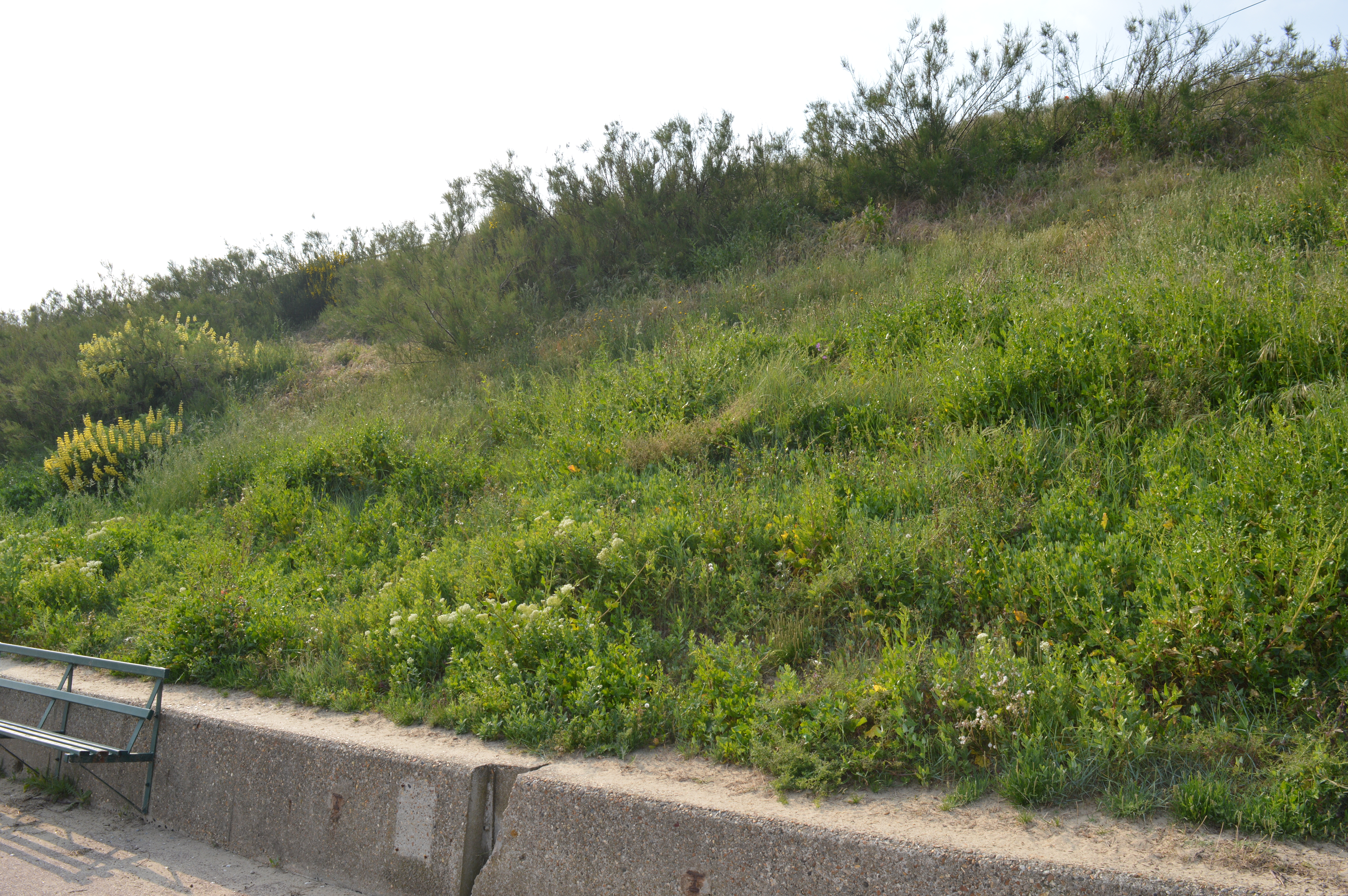
- Location of Holland-on-Sea Cliff.
- Area of search: Essex
- Grid reference: TM 211167
- Interest: Geological
- Area: 0.1 ha (0.25 acres)
- Notification date: 1992
- Location map: Magic Map

Holland-on-Sea Cliff is a 0.1-hectare (0.25-acre) geological Site of Special Scientific Interest in Holland-on-Sea, north-west of Clacton-on-Sea in Essex. It is a Geological Conservation Review site.

This site is of great importance in understanding the evolution of the London Basin, and it is the type site for two different gravels. The "Lower Holland Gravel" was the final terrace laid down by the River Thames before the river was diverted south during the Anglian glaciation around 450,000 years ago. The "Upper Thames Gravel" was deposited when the Thames was blocked by ice and not reaching the area. As the terraces can be attributed to the Anglian glaciation, they provide a fixed point for correlation other Anglian sequences in southern Britain and on the Continent.

The site is a short stretch of the slope between the Esplanade and the Promenade, opposite Haven Avenue. No geology is visible.
