= Mucking Flats and Marshes =

Protected area in Essex, England

Coordinates: 51.496°N 0.449°E

- Site of Special Scientific Interest
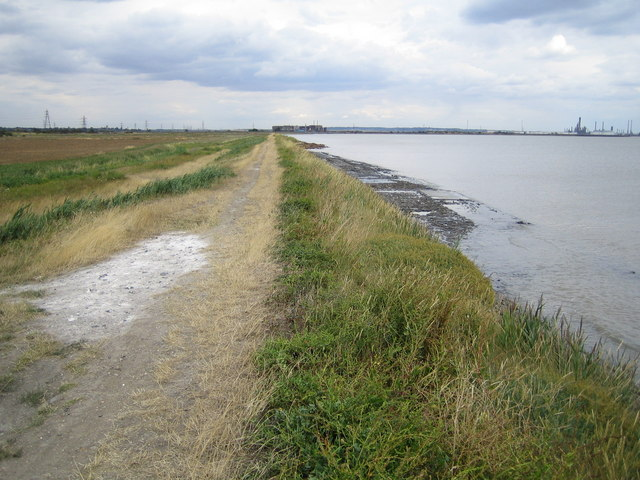
- Location of Mucking Flats and Marshes.
- Area of search: Essex
- Grid reference: TQ 696785
- Interest: Biological
- Area: 311.6 ha (770 acres)
- Notification date: 1991
- Location map: Magic Map

Mucking Flats and Marshes is a 311.6 biological Site of Special Scientific Interest east of Tilbury in Essex. It is part of the Thames Estuary and Marshes Ramsar site. and Special Protection Area

The site is an extensive stretch of mudflats, saltmarsh and the sea wall, on the eastern side of the River Thames. Wildfowl and waders feed and roost on the site, with internationally important numbers of ringed plover, and nationally significant shelducks, grey plovers, dunlins, black-tailed godwits and redshanks. Plants include the nationally scarce golden samphire, and invertebrates the rare spider baryphyma duffeyi.

The Thames Estuary Path goes through the site.

== Land ownership ==
All land within Mucking Flats and Marshes SSSI is owned by the local authority.
