= Marks Tey Brickpit =

Protected area in Essex, England

Coordinates: 51.885°N 0.774°E

- Site of Special Scientific Interest
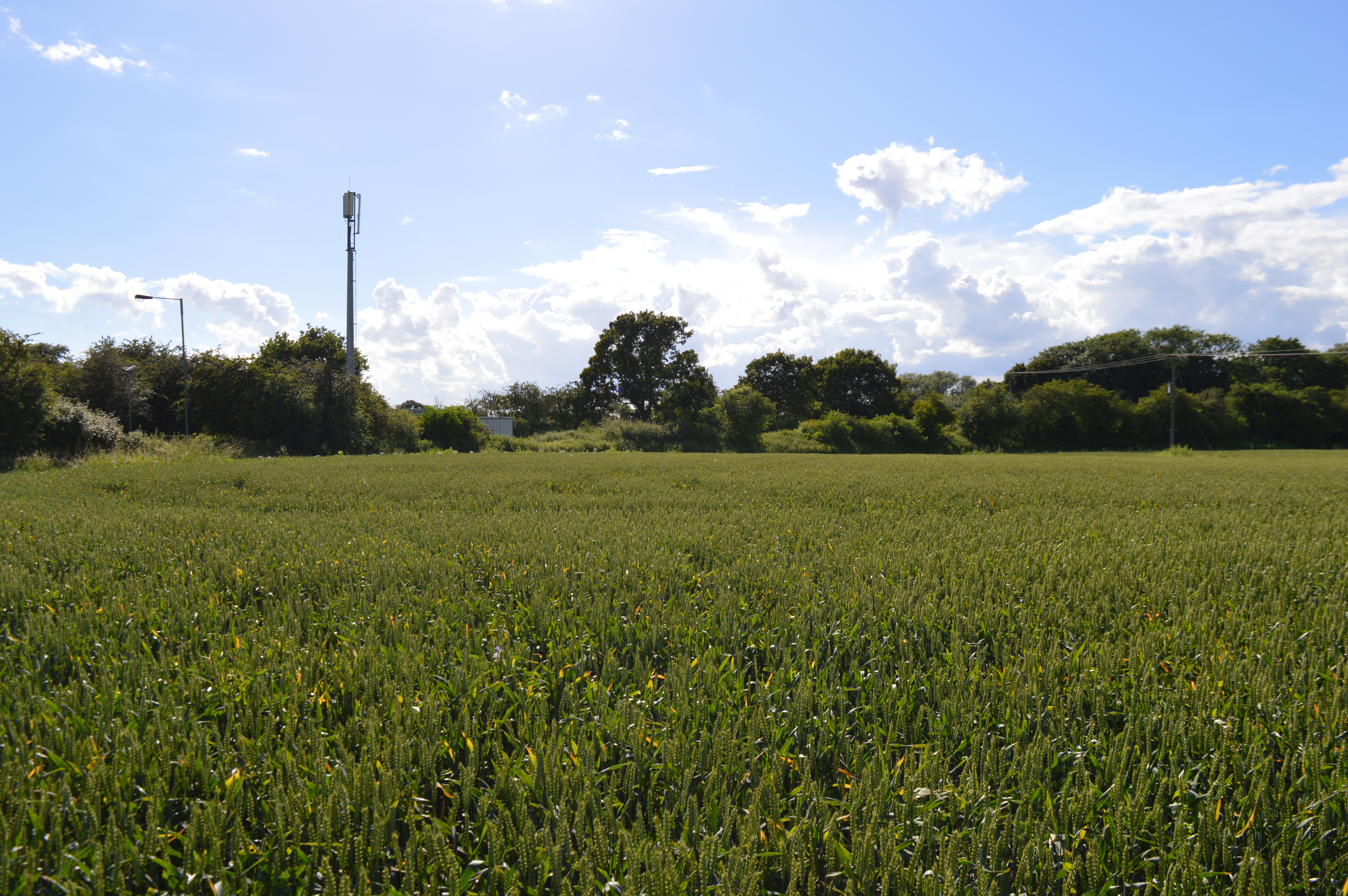
- View of an area of the site which is now a field
- Location of Marks Tey Brickpit.
- Area of search: Essex
- Grid reference: TL 911243
- Interest: Geological
- Area: 29.5 ha (73 acres)
- Notification date: 1986
- Location map: Magic Map

Marks Tey Brickpit is a 29.5-hectare (73-acre) geological Site of Special Scientific Interest in Marks Tey in Essex. It is a Geological Conservation Review site.

This site has a record of pollen throughout the Hoxnian interglacial around 400,000 years ago, and this is the best vegetational record for any British interglacial site. Seasonal layers in lake sediments have made it possible to estimate the duration of the Hoxnian. Clay deposited in the lake is quarried at a brickworks on the site, and this exposes layers above the Hoxnian ones of a later colder period. There is also a Grade II listed early nineteenth-century bottle kiln and brick tile works on the site.

The site is overgrown apart from a small area used for brick making. It is private land with no public access, but a small area, which is now a field, can be seen from Marks Tey railway station car park.
