= Wivenhoe Gravel Pit =

Protected area in Essex, England

Coordinates: 51.872°N 0.977°E

- Site of Special Scientific Interest
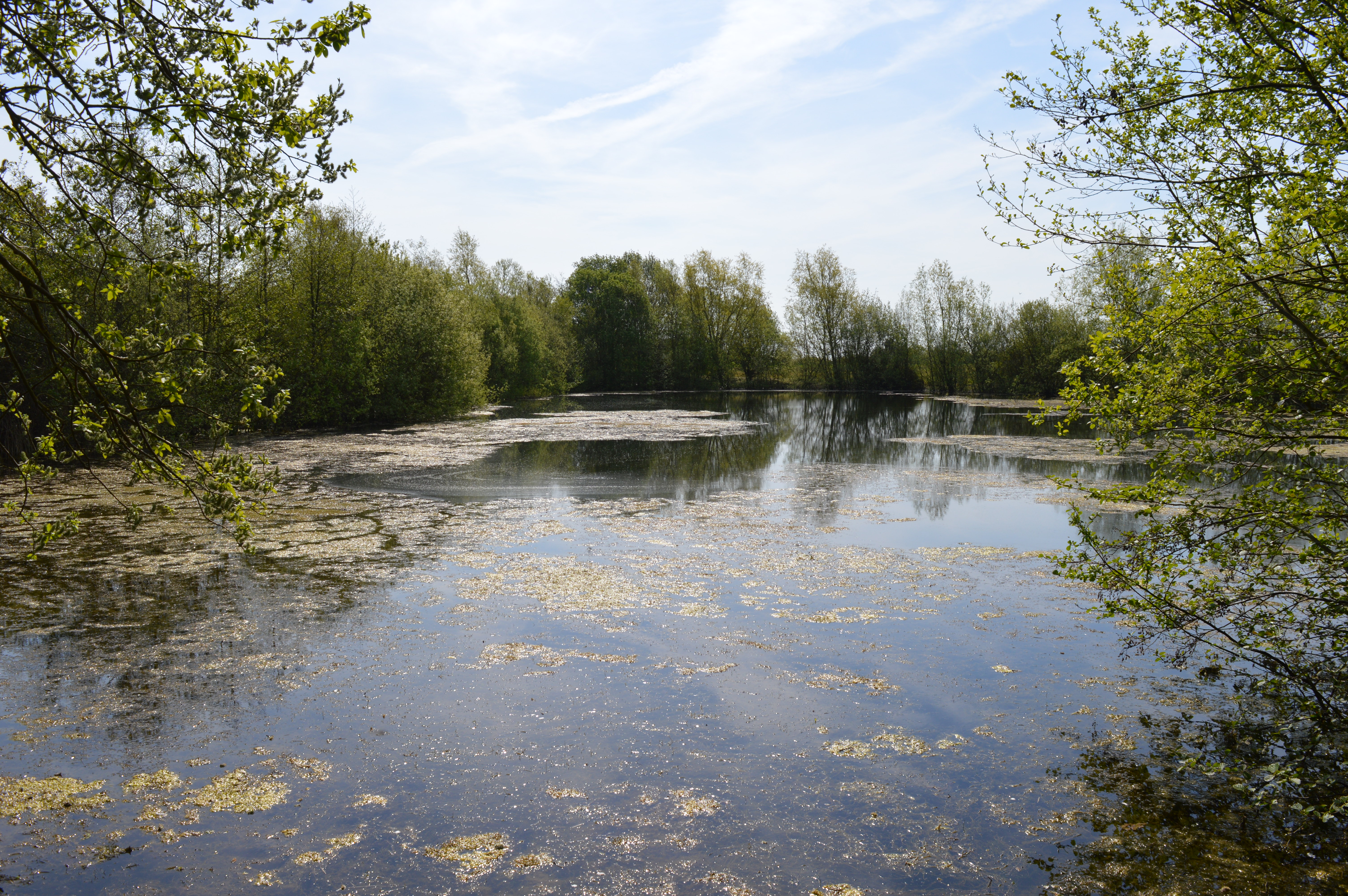
- Location of Wivenhoe Gravel Pit.
- Area of search: Essex
- Grid reference: TM050236
- Interest: Geological
- Area: 2.1 ha (5.2 acres)
- Notification date: 1992
- Location map: Magic Map

Wivenhoe Gravel Pit is a 2.1-hectare (5.2-acre) geological Site of Special Scientific Interest north of Wivenhoe in Essex. It is a Geological Conservation Review site.

The site is the type locality for the Wivenhoe Gravel, which was laid down by the River Thames before it was diverted south to its present course by the Anglian glaciation around 450,000 years ago. The gravel was laid down during two cold stages with an intervening interglacial, but the fossils in from this warmer period are not distinctive enough to identify which interglacial they come from. The site is important for establishing the previous course of the Thames. Two worked flints may be evidence of occupation by Homo heidelbergensis around half a million years ago.

The pit, which is now water filled, is in a field off Brightlingsea Road opposite Broad Lanes.
