= Elsenham Woods =

Protected area in Essex, England

Coordinates: 51.904809°N 0.268419°E

- Site of Special Scientific Interest
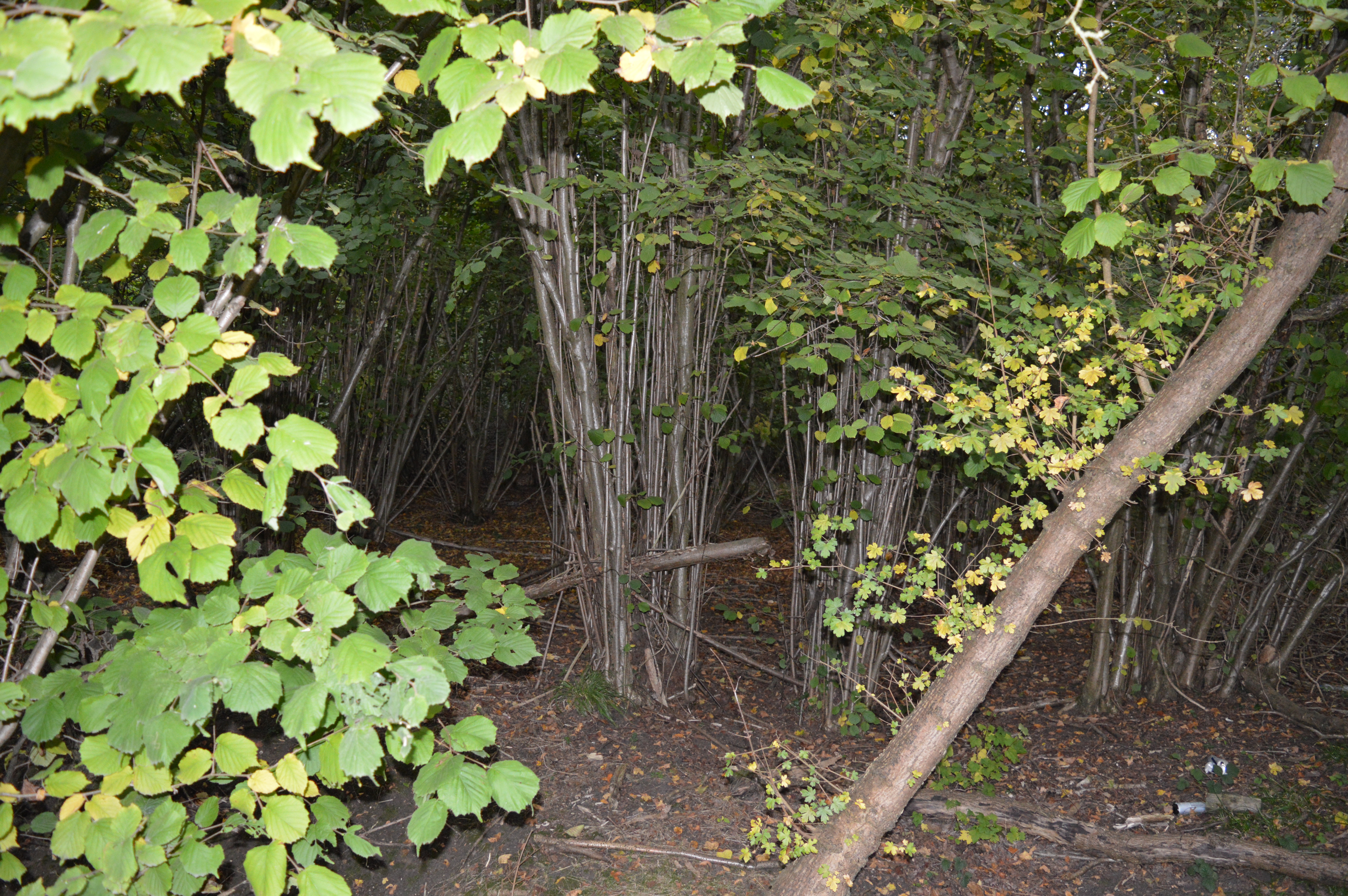
- Eastend Wood
- Location of Elsenham Woods.
- Area of search: Essex
- Grid reference: TL562255; TL559264
- Interest: Biological
- Area: 44.4 ha (110 acres)
- Notification date: 1986
- Location map: Magic Map

Elsenham Woods is a 44.4-hectare (110-acre) biological Site of Special Scientific Interest east of Elsenham in Essex. It was notified under Section 28 of the Wildlife and Countryside Act 1981, and the local planning authority is Uttlesford District Council.

The site comprises two separate areas, the larger Eastend Wood and the smaller Plegdon Wood. They are both ancient mixed woods on chalky boulder clay. There are also damp grass rides and ponds which provide additional habitats for invertebrates and birds.

The site is private land with no public access.
