= High Wood, Dunmow =

Protected area in Essex, England

Coordinates: 51.873°N 0.327°E

- Site of Special Scientific Interest
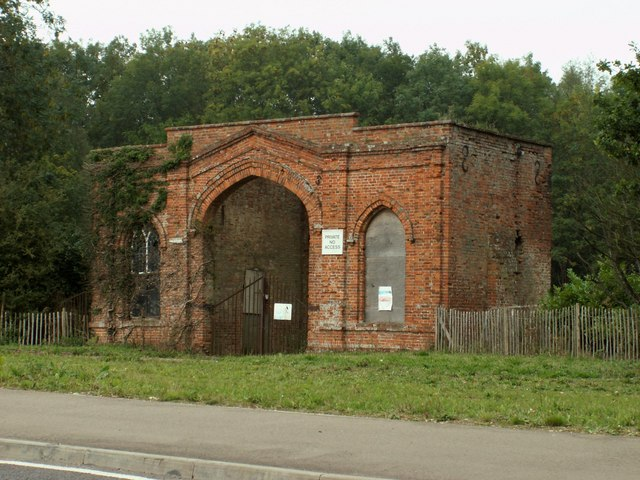
- The ruined gatehouse to High Wood
- Location of High Wood, Dunmow.
- Area of search: Essex
- Grid reference: TL 603220
- Interest: Biological
- Area: 41.5 ha (103 acres)
- Notification date: 1986
- Location map: Magic Map

High Wood, Dunmow is a 41.5-hectare (103-acre) biological Site of Special Scientific Interest in Great Dunmow in Essex. The local planning authority is Uttlesford District Council.

The site on boulder clay and loess has areas of wet ash and maple woodland, and others of pedunculate oak and hornbeam. Some areas are ancient woodland. There is a diverse layer of ground flora, such as dog's mercury and primrose, while damp woodland rides provide additional habitat for birds and invertebrates.

The site is private land with no public access.
