= Harwich Foreshore =

Protected area in Essex, England

Coordinates: 51.941°N 1.291°E

- Site of Special Scientific Interest
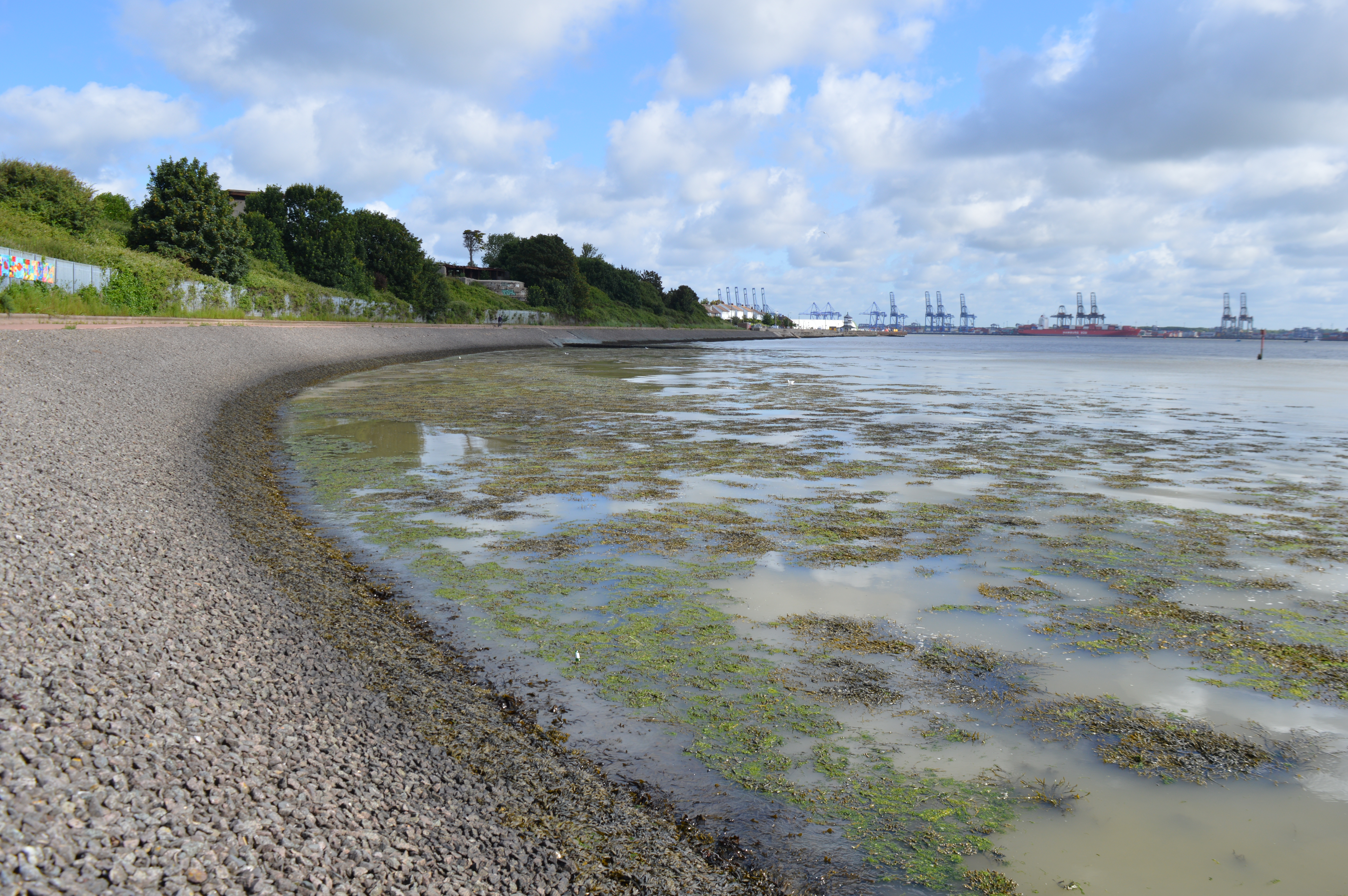
- Location of Harwich Foreshore.
- Area of search: Essex
- Grid reference: TM 263320
- Interest: Geological
- Area: 10.6 ha (26 acres)
- Notification date: 1986
- Location map: Magic Map

Harwich Foreshore is a 10.6-hectare (26-acre) geological Site of Special Scientific Interest in Harwich in Essex. It is a Geological Conservation Review site.

This site exposes bands of ash at the base of London clay from explosive volcanoes in Scotland during the Eocene epoch around 50 million years ago. It also has many London clay fossils from the Eocene rainforest, including mammals such as Hyracotherium, the earliest ancestor of the horse. The site is important in the history of geology as fossils have been collected there for over 300 years.

The site is a stretch of beach which is under water at high tide.
