= Ardleigh Gravel Pit =

Site in Essex, UK

Coordinates: 51.914°N 0.986°E

- Site of Special Scientific Interest
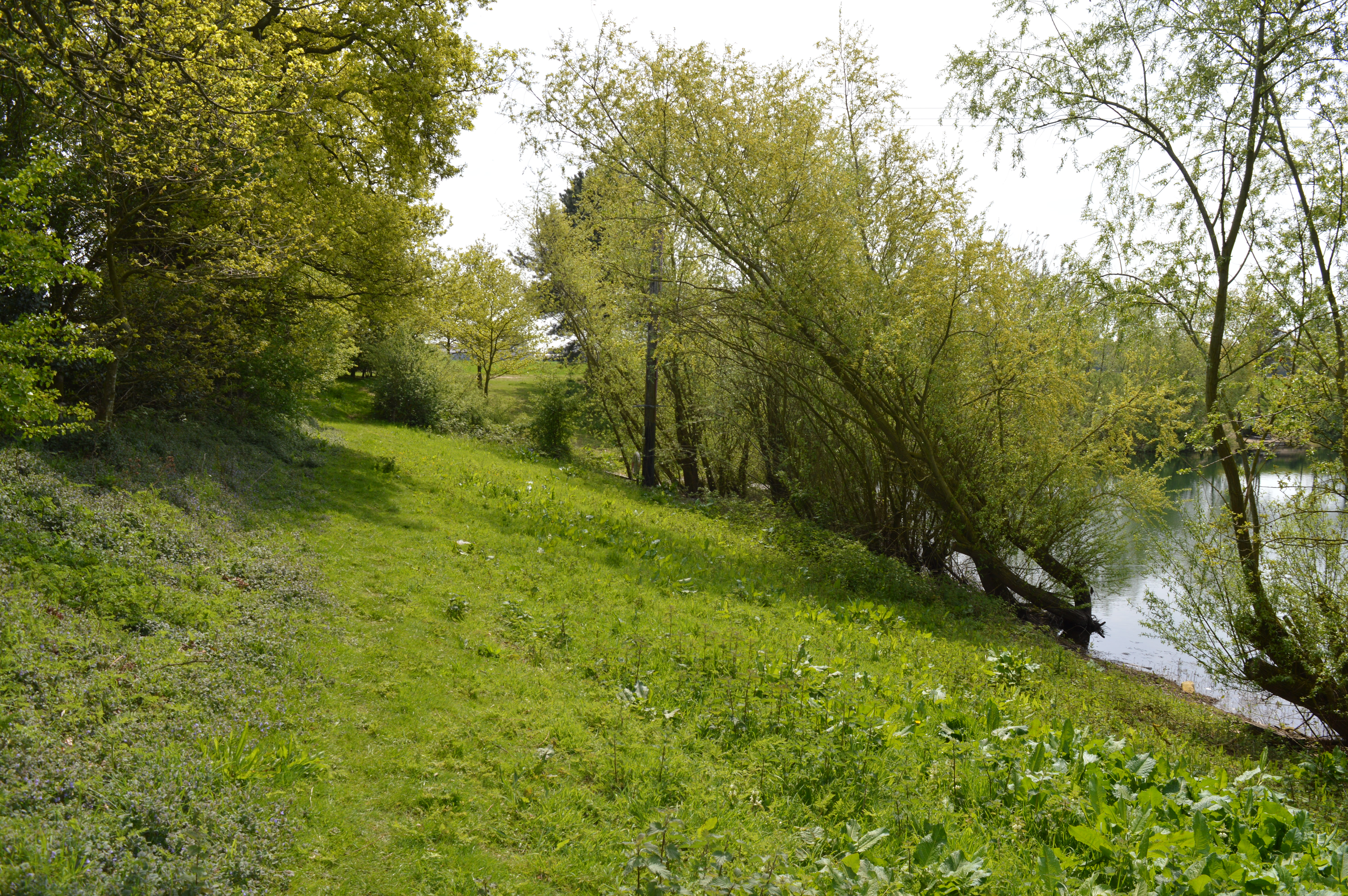
- Location of Ardleigh Gravel Pit.
- Area of search: Essex
- Grid reference: TM 055281; TM 052281
- Interest: Geological
- Area: 1.2 ha (3.0 acres)
- Notification date: 1992
- Location map: Magic Map

Ardleigh Gravel Pit is a 1.2-hectare (3.0-acre) geological Site of Special Scientific Interest south of Ardleigh in Essex. It is a Geological Conservation Review site.

The site exposes a succession of Pleistocene levels, with an interglacial between two glacial periods. The interglacial may date back 700,000 years. The site has plant microfossils rare or unique in Britain, and according to Natural England's description in 1992, it may become the type site for a previously unrecognised British early middle Pleistocene interglacial.

The site is divided into two areas. The main one is L-shaped, forming the sloping south-east and north-east borders of a water filled pit. A footpath between Slough Lane and Park Farm runs along its north-east boundary. East of the main site is a small linear feature which has been filled in. It is on private land with no public access.
