= Goldsands Road Pit =

Protected area in Essex, England

Coordinates: 51.656°N 0.832°E

- Site of Special Scientific Interest
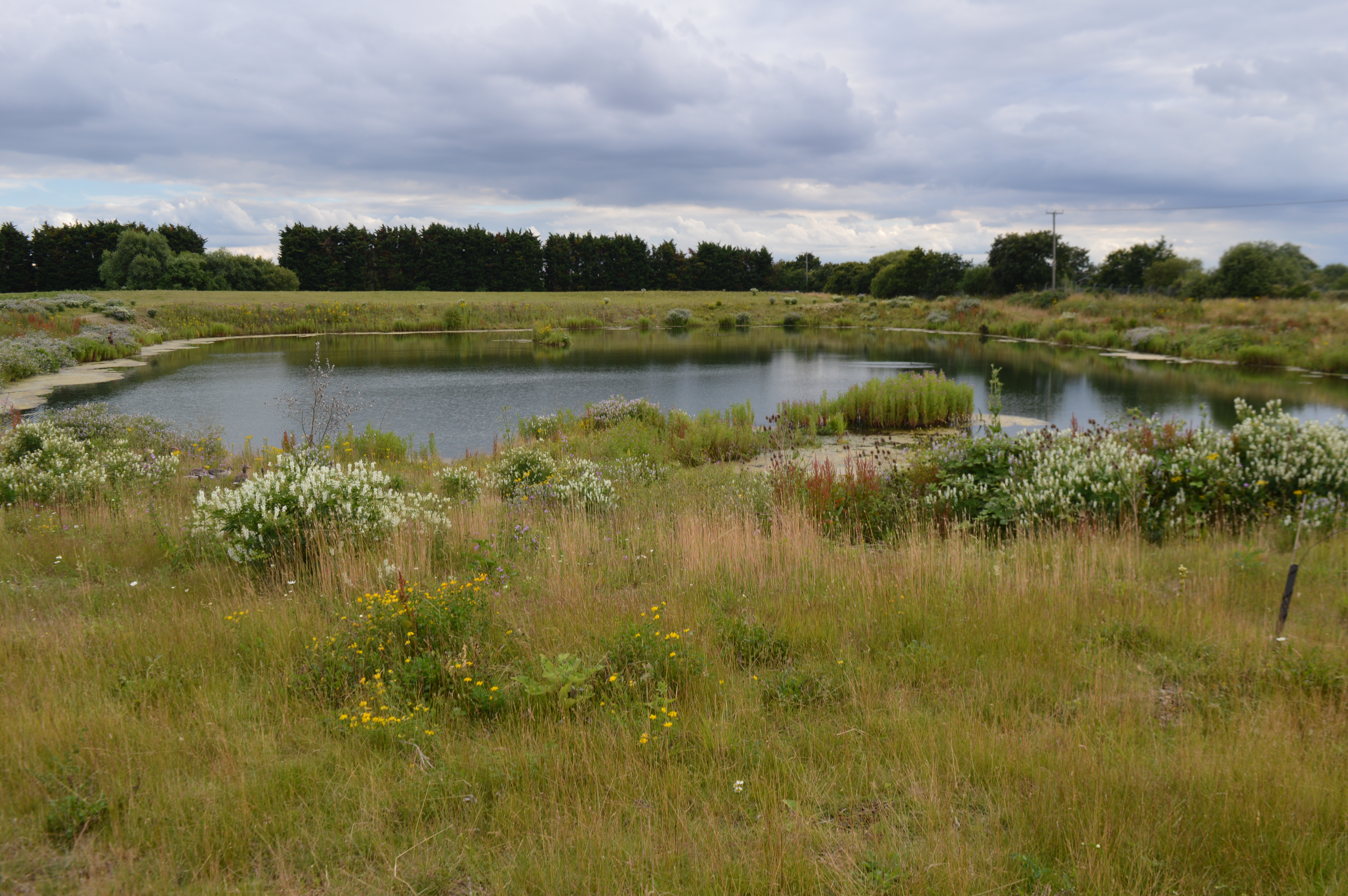
- Location of Goldsands Road Pit.
- Area of search: Essex
- Grid reference: TQ 960990
- Interest: Geological
- Area: 1.3 ha (3.2 acres)
- Notification date: 1986
- Location map: Magic Map

Goldsands Road Pit is a 1.3-hectare (3.2-acre) geological Site of Special Scientific Interest in Southminster in Essex. It is a Geological Conservation Review site.

This site provides the earliest evidence of an ancient course of the combined Thames and Medway rivers, which flowed north-east across eastern Essex in the late Anglian period around 400,000 years ago.

The site is on private land with no public access.
