= Riddles Wood =

Woodland in Essex, England

Coordinates: 51.818°N 1.088°E

- Site of Special Scientific Interest
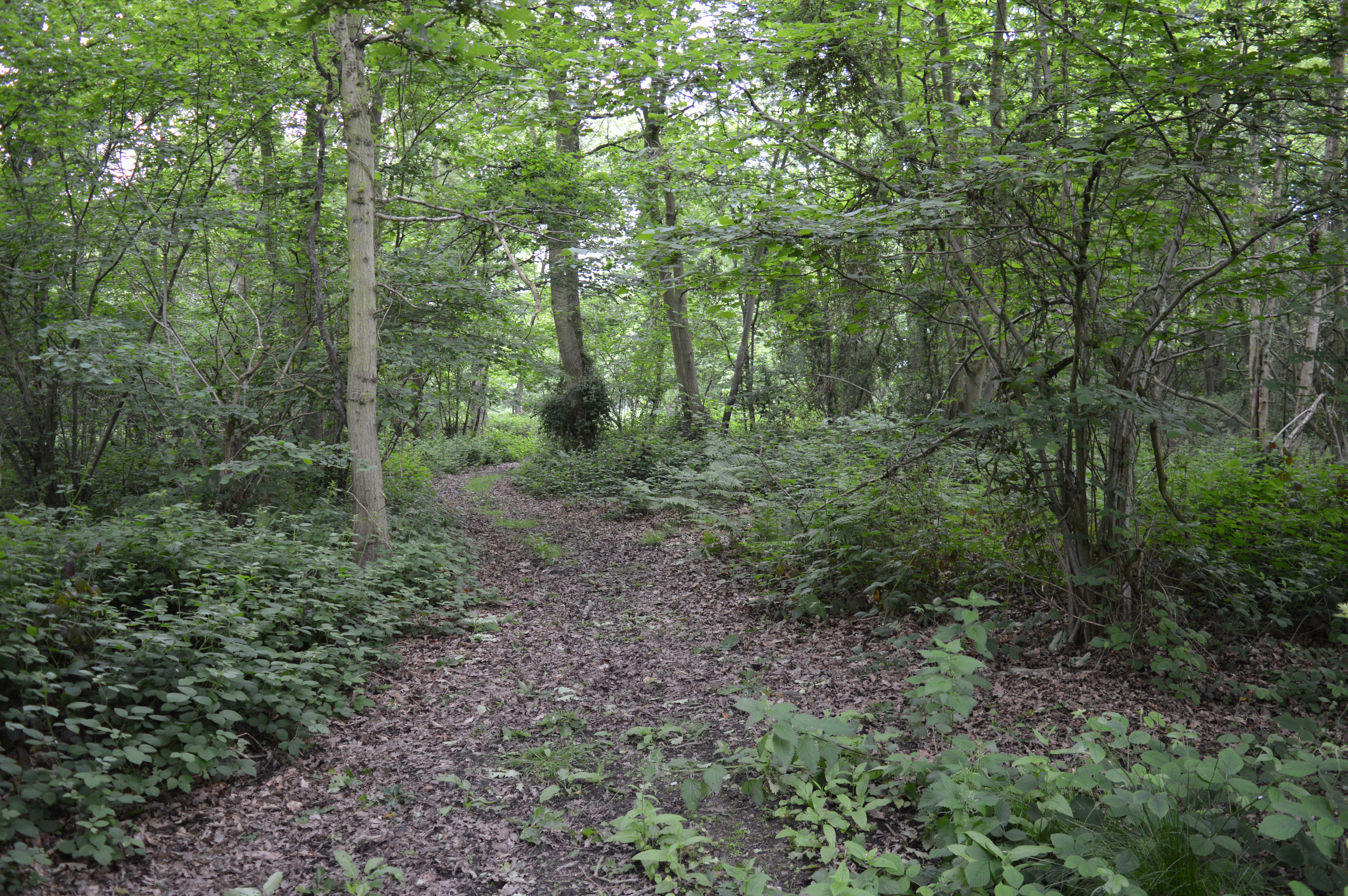
- Location of Riddles Wood.
- Area of search: Essex
- Grid reference: TM 129180
- Interest: Biological
- Area: 37.3 ha (92 acres)
- Notification date: 1985
- Location map: Magic Map

Riddles Wood is a 37.3-hectare (92-acre) biological Site of Special Scientific Interest between Brightlingsea and Clacton-on-Sea in Essex.

The site has varied ancient pedunculate oak and hazel in some areas and oak and hornbeam in others, as well as chestnut coppice. The soils are glacial gravels in the west and London clay in the east. The ground flora rich and varied, although dominated by bramble, and there are also rides and a small pond. A rare flower on the site is orpine.

The site is private land.
