= Harlow Woods =

Woodlands in Harlow, Essex, England

Coordinates: 51.74°N 0.084°E

- Site of Special Scientific Interest
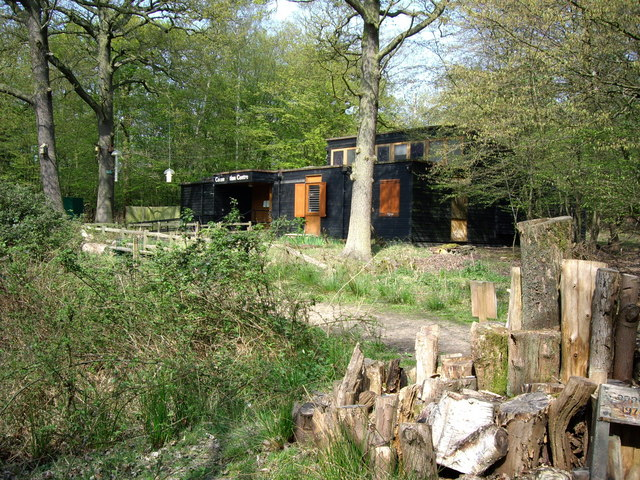
- Parndon Wood Conservation Centre
- Location of Harlow Woods.
- Area of search: Essex
- Grid reference: TL 447067; TL 440065
- Interest: Biological
- Area: 47.1 ha (116 acres)
- Notification date: 1986
- Location map: Magic Map

Harlow Woods is a 47.1-hectare (116-acre) biological Site of Special Scientific Interest in Harlow in Essex. It is composed of three woods, Hospital Wood Risden's Wood and Parndon Wood. They are owned and maintained by Harlow District Council, and they are part of the slightly larger Parndon Woods and Common Local Nature Reserve.

The woods are mainly pedunculate oak and hornbeam, and other trees include ash, hazel and birch. There are also some elms which are regenerating from coppice following Dutch elm disease. There is grassland in ridings and clearings, and ponds and streams provide additional habitats for invertebrates. There are birds such as jays, nuthatches and great spotted woodpeckers.

There is access from Parndon Wood Road.
