= Sandbeach Meadows =

Protected area in Essex, England

Coordinates: 51.707°N 0.924°E

- Site of Special Scientific Interest
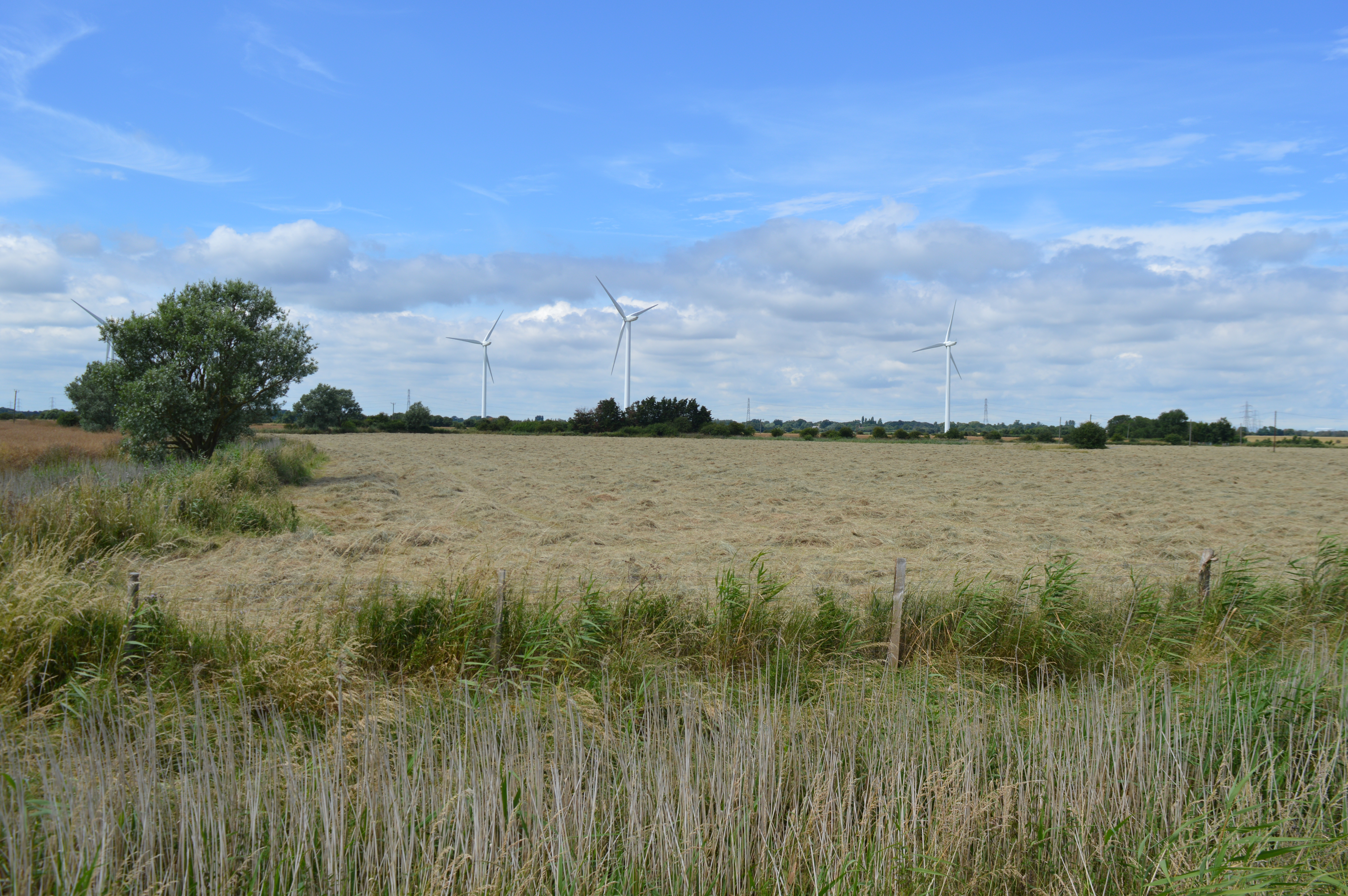
- Location of Sandbeach Meadows.
- Area of search: Essex
- Grid reference: TM 021050
- Interest: Biological
- Area: 30.0 ha (74 acres)
- Notification date: 1987
- Location map: Magic Map

Sandbeach Meadows are a 30.3-hectare (75-acre) biological Site of Special Scientific Interest on the Dengie Peninsula, south-east of Bradwell-on-Sea in Essex. The local planning authority is Maldon District Council.

The site is seven fields of unimproved grassland, and it is almost the only survivor of the formerly extensive Dengie grazing marshes. In the winter it supports a nationally important population of dark-bellied brent geese, and it is also used by wigeons and European white-fronted geese. Several ditches have meanders which survive from when they were salt-marsh creeks.

The site is in two separate areas which are private land, but the St Peter's Way long distance footpath goes through the southern area.
