= Maldon Cutting =

Protected area in Essex, England

Coordinates: 51.729°N 0.664°E

- Site of Special Scientific Interest
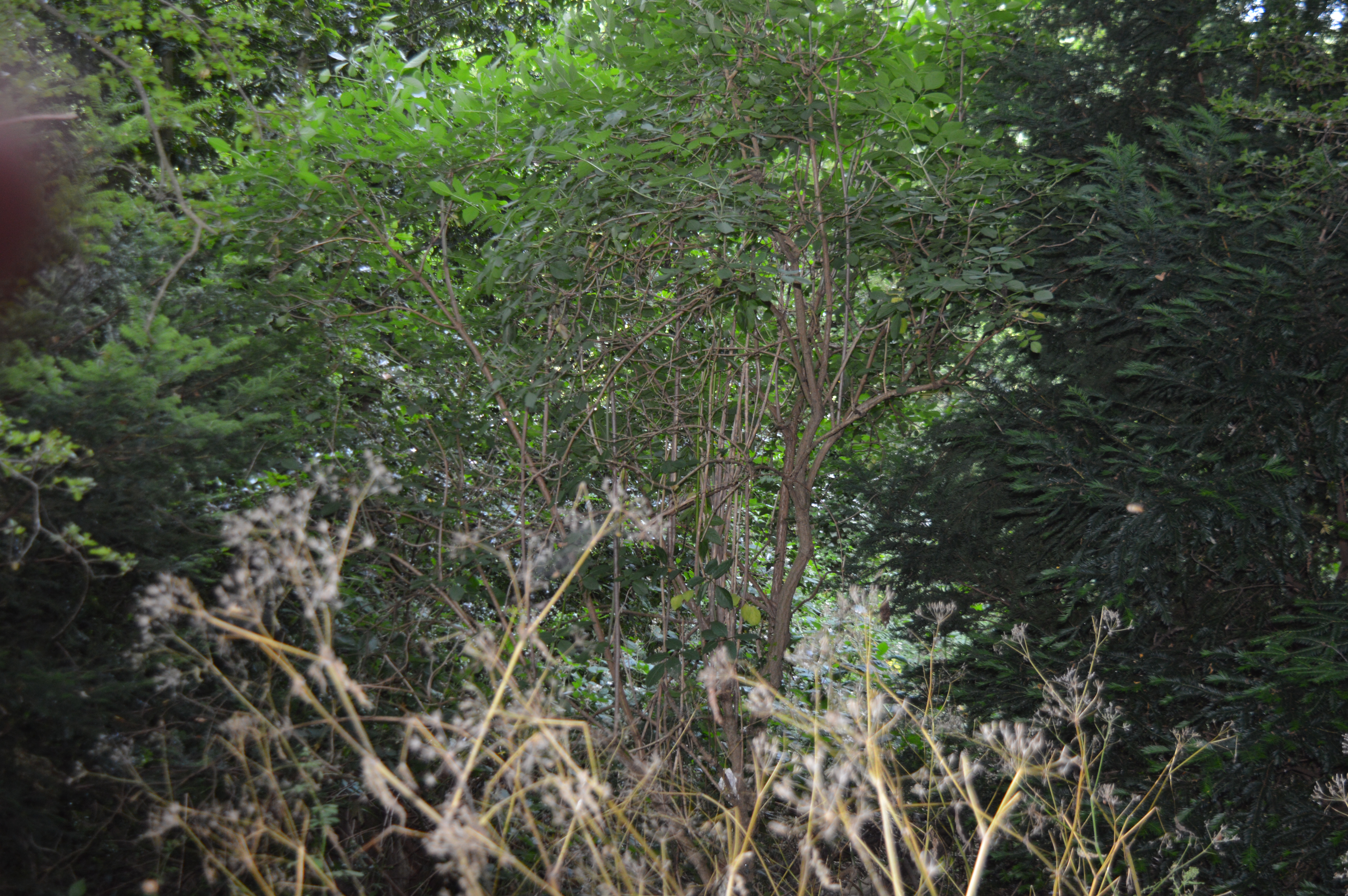
- Location of Maldon Cutting.
- Area of search: Essex
- Grid reference: TL 842068
- Interest: Geological
- Area: 0.1 ha (0.25 acres)
- Notification date: 1986
- Location map: Magic Map

Maldon Cutting is a 0.1-hectare (0.25-acre) geological Site of Special Scientific Interest in Maldon in Essex. It is a Geological Conservation Review site.

The site is a former railway cutting which is the type locality for the Maldon Till, which dates to the Pleistocene ice age. It was previously thought to represent a separate advance of the ice sheet, but in the light of later work it was concluded that it is an outlier of the till which covers much of central and northern Essex. Finds include a flint hand axe.

The overgrown site is on private land with no public access.

== Land ownership ==
All land within Maldon Cutting SSSI is owned by the local authority.
