= Vange and Fobbing Marshes =

Protected area in Essex, England

Coordinates: 51.527°N 0.494°E

- Site of Special Scientific Interest
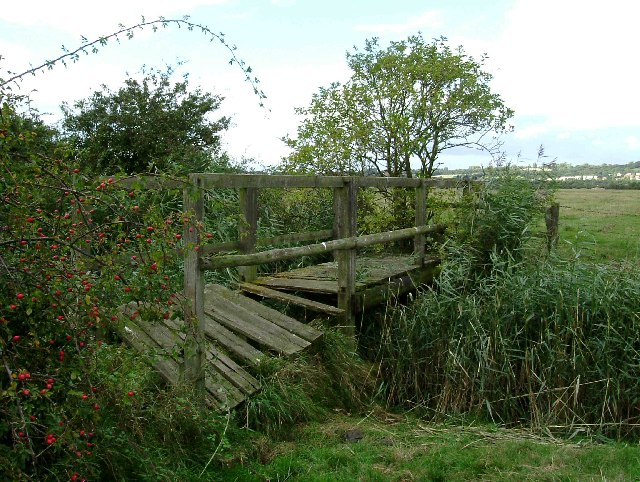
- Location of Vange and Fobbing Marshes.
- Area of search: Essex
- Grid reference: TQ 730840; TQ 725867
- Interest: Biological
- Area: 164.6 ha (407 acres)
- Notification date: 1987
- Location map: Magic Map

Vange and Fobbing Marshes are a 164.6-hectare (407-acre) biological Site of Special Scientific Interest in two areas south of Basildon in Essex, England. Vange Marsh is managed by the Royal Society for the Protection of Birds.

The marshes are unimproved coastal grassland, dykes and creeks, with a wide variety of maritime herbs and grasses, some of them nationally rare. The site is the main British location for least lettuce. Insects with restricted distributions include the scarce emerald damselfly and Roesel's bush cricket. There are birds at Vange Marsh such as avocets, common terns and black-tailed godwits.

There is access to Fobbing Marsh by footpaths from Corringham, and Vange Marsh is 600 metres from Pitsea railway station.
