= Hall's Quarry =

Site of Special Scientific Interest in Essex, England

Coordinates: 51.929°N 0.206°E

- Site of Special Scientific Interest
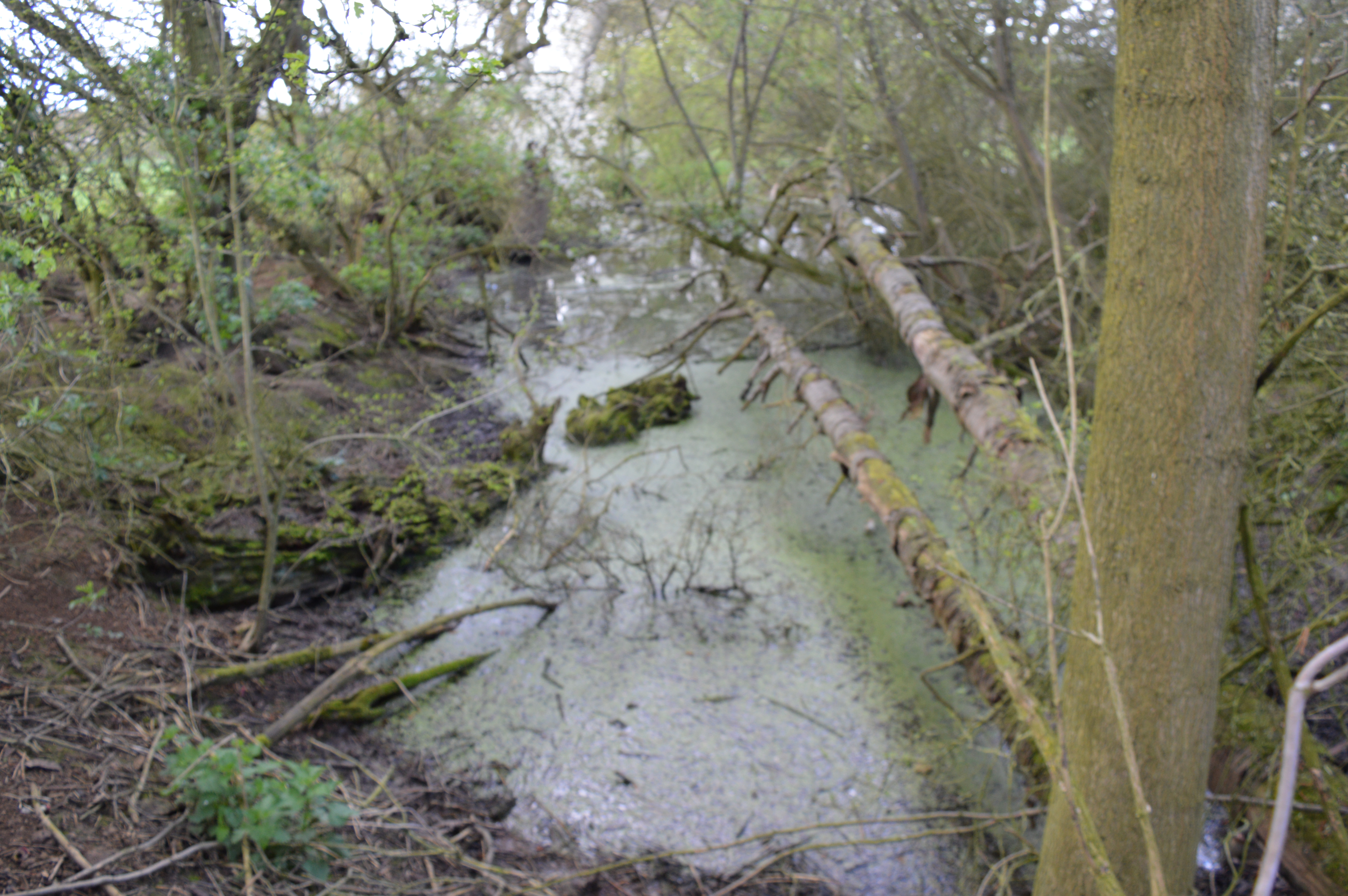
- Location of Hall's Quarry.
- Area of search: Essex
- Grid reference: TL 517280
- Interest: Geological
- Area: 0.8 ha (2.0 acres)
- Notification date: 1987
- Location map: Magic Map

Hall's Quarry is a 0.8-hectare (2.0-acre) geological Site of Special Scientific Interest north-west of Ugley Green in Essex. It is a Geological Conservation Review site.

The site is divided between two small blocks of land. It exposes glacial gravels, silts and tills deposited during the Anglian ice age around 450,000 years ago. The gravels provide an unusual opportunity to see the type of material carried into the London area by this glaciation. The site is described by Natural England as "extremely important for the study of the Anglian glaciation and its associated deposits".

The site is on private land with no public access.
