= Lofts Farm Pit =

Geological site in Essex, England

Coordinates: 51.75°N 0.699°E

- Site of Special Scientific Interest
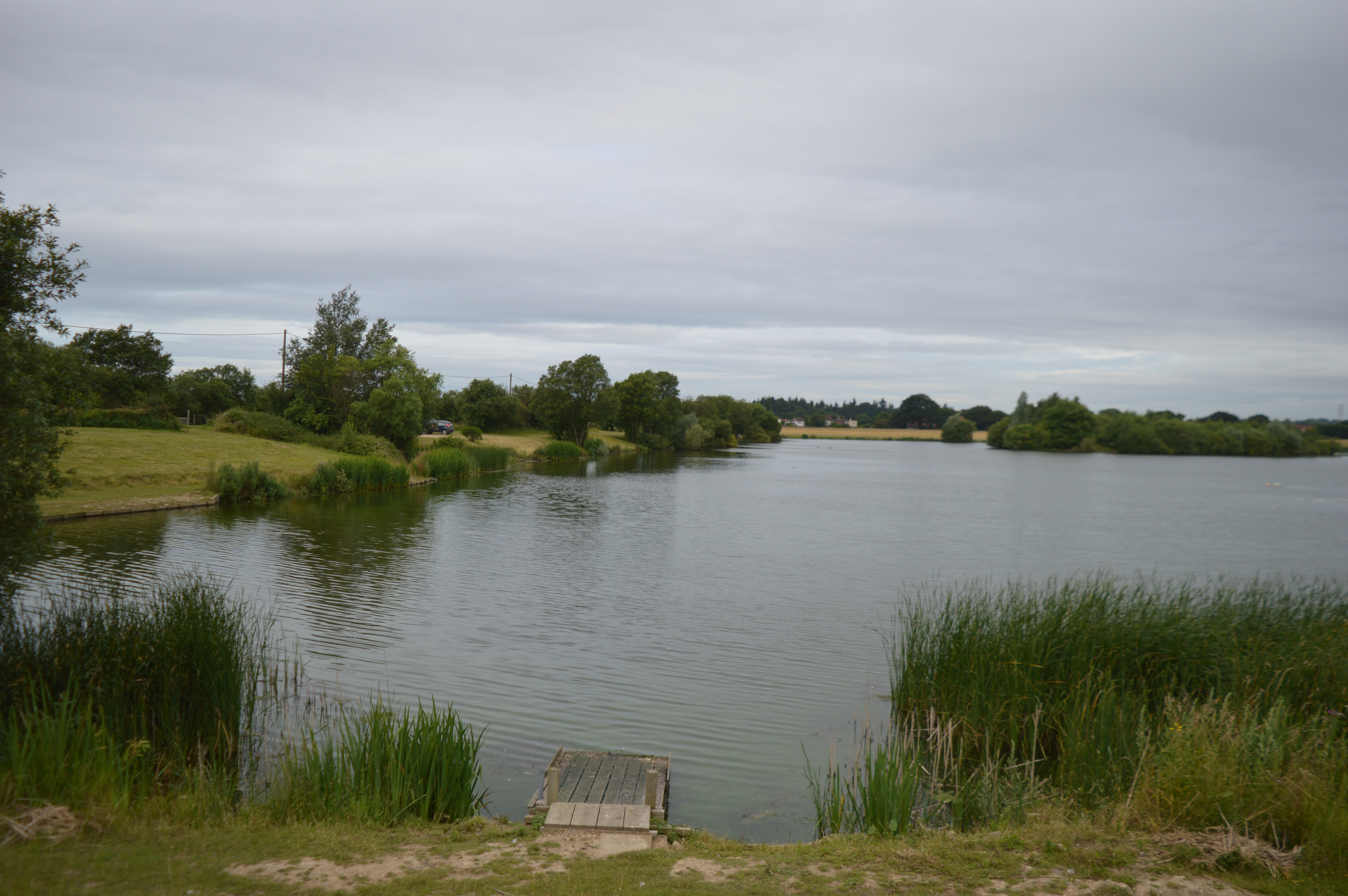
- Location of Lofts Farm Pit.
- Area of search: Essex
- Grid reference: TL 864091
- Interest: Geological
- Area: 4.5 ha (11 acres)
- Notification date: 1994
- Location map: Magic Map

Lofts Farm Pit is a 4.5-hectare (11-acre) geological Site of Special Scientific Interest in Heybridge, a suburb of Maldon in Essex. It is a Geological Conservation Review site.

Many fossils have been found at the former gravel pit dating to the last Ice Age, 110,000 to 12,000 years ago. Finds included reindeer, woolly mammoth and woolly rhinoceros. They date to a period when what is now the North Sea was Doggerland, and the River Blackwater was a tributary of the Thames/Medway river.

The site has been converted into a lake and there is no public access.
