= Blake's Wood & Lingwood Common =

Protected area in Danbury, Essex, England

Coordinates: 51.731438°N 0.565309°E

- Site of Special Scientific Interest
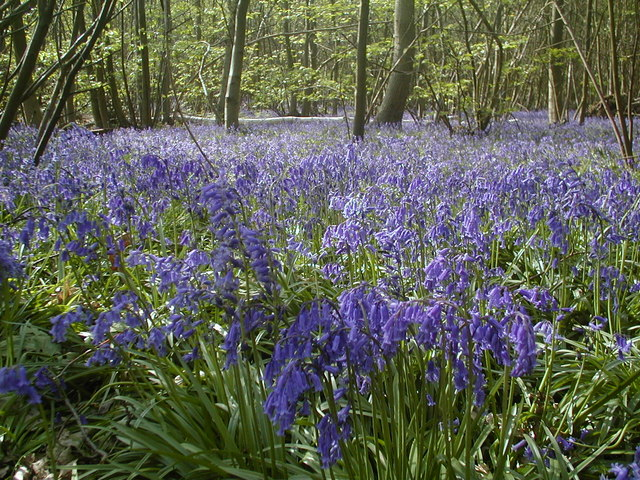
- Location of Blake's Wood & Lingwood Common.
- Area of search: Essex
- Grid reference: TL774067; TL778060
- Interest: Biological
- Area: 93.2 ha (230 acres)
- Notification date: 1986
- Location map: Magic Map

Blake's Wood & Lingwood Common is a 93.2-hectare (230-acre) biological Site of Special Scientific Interest in Danbury in Essex. It is owned by the National Trust and the local planning authority is Chelmsford City Council.

The soils on this site are glacial sands and gravels over London clay, resulting in a mixture of woodland, heath and bog habitats. Blake's Wood is ancient woodland on a sloping site, with valleys and streams. The main trees are oak, together with other species such as hornbeam and sweet chestnut. There is a wide variety of birds, such as hawfinches and nightingales, and the underlayer is dominated by bluebells and primroses. The heath is being invaded by trees and bracken. Acid grassland is dominated by red fescue, and there are two rare moths, Deltote bankiana and Elaphria venustula.

There is access from Riffhams Chase, which separates the two parts of the site, with the wood to the north and the common to the south.
