= Bullock Wood =

Biological Site of Special Scientific Interest in England

Coordinates: 51.913°N 0.934°E

- Site of Special Scientific Interest
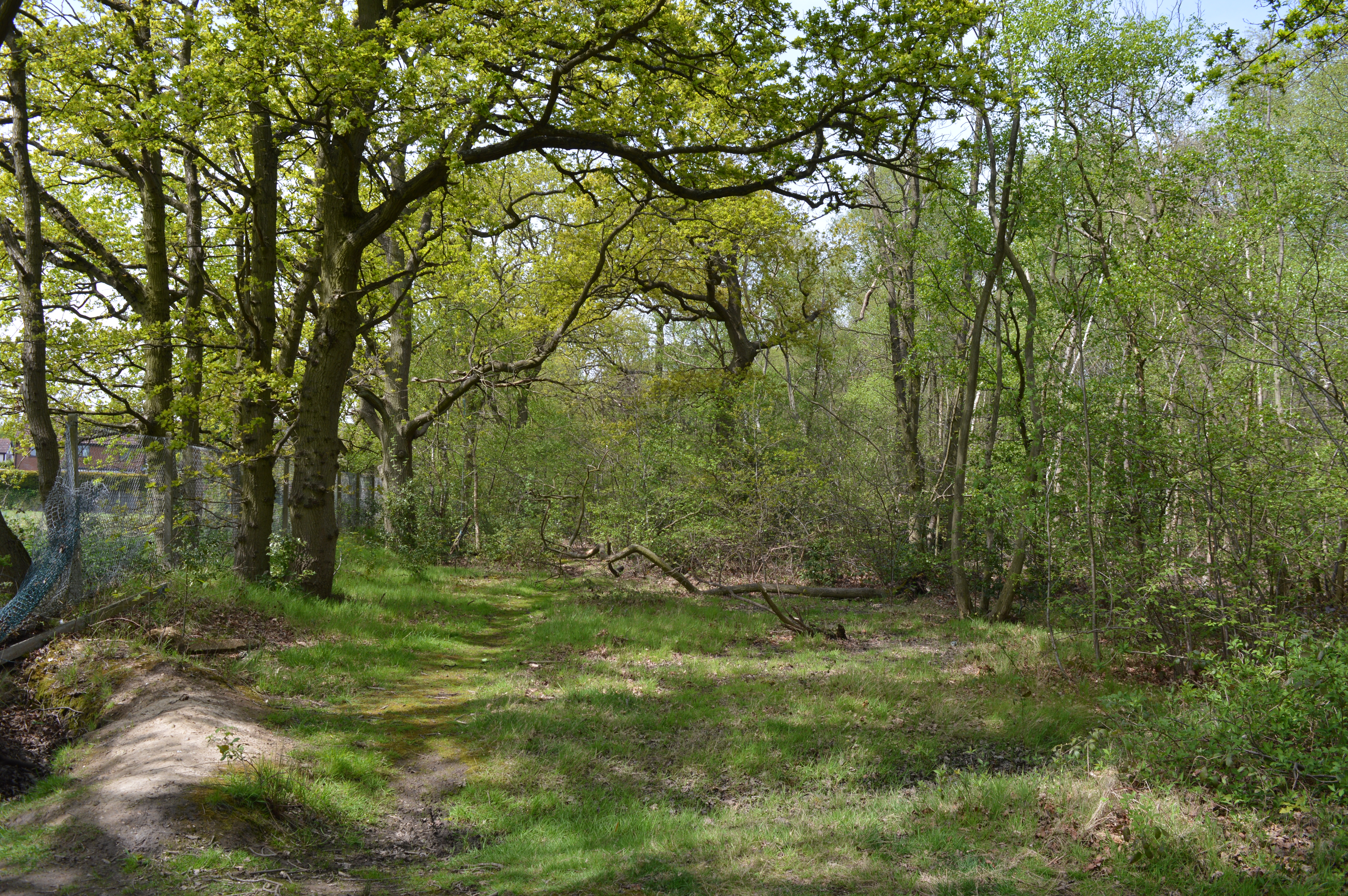
- Location of Bullock Wood.
- Area of search: Essex
- Grid reference: TM019277
- Interest: Biological
- Area: 23.3 ha (58 acres)
- Notification date: 1985
- Location map: Magic Map

Bullock Wood is a 23.3-hectare (58-acre) biological Site of Special Scientific Interest on the northern outskirts of Colchester in Essex.

The site is mature coppice with a wide variety of trees. The main woodland type is hazel and sessile oak, which is rare nationally. The understorey is mainly coppiced hazel, and the ground flora is dominated by bramble and bracken.

The site is private land with no public access.
