= Chalkney Wood =

Biological Site of Special Scientific Interest in Essex, England

Coordinates: 51.9167°N 0.7242°E

- Site of Special Scientific Interest
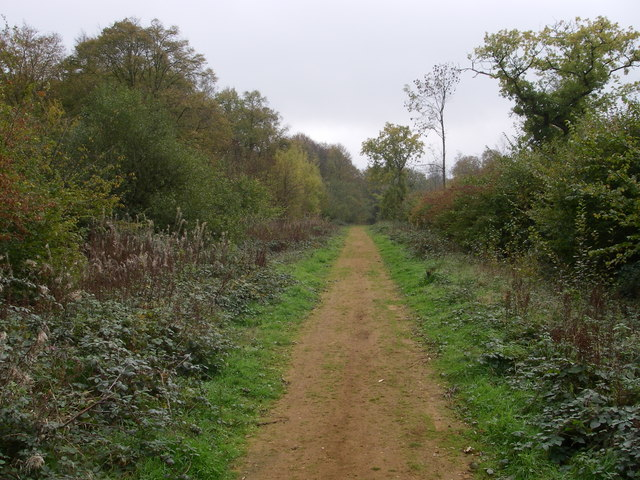
- Location of Chalkney Wood.
- Area of search: Essex
- Grid reference: TL774067; TL875278
- Interest: Biological
- Area: 72.6 ha (179 acres)
- Notification date: 1988
- Location map: Magic Map

Chalkney Wood is a 72.6-hectare (179-acre) biological Site of Special Scientific Interest south-east of Earls Colne in Essex, England. 25 hectares is owned by Essex County Council and 48 hectares by Forestry England.

There is evidence of occupation going back to the Roman period, and at the beginning of the twelfth century the wood was donated by Aubrey de Vere I (or his son Aubrey de Vere II) to Colne Priory. The site has been managed by coppicing for over 400 years. The ancient woodland is on acid silts and sands. Trees include, ash, lime birch and pedunculated oak. The ground layer is dominated by bramble, and other plants include primrose and wood anemone. The wood is divided by grassy rides, and there are over twenty ponds. There are two Scheduled Monuments, Chalkney Mill and Chalkney Mill House, on the edge of the wood.

There is access by footpaths which cross the wood, including one from Swansomb Road.
