= Ashdon Meadows =

Grassland in Essex, England

Coordinates: 52.036°N 0.318°E

- Site of Special Scientific Interest
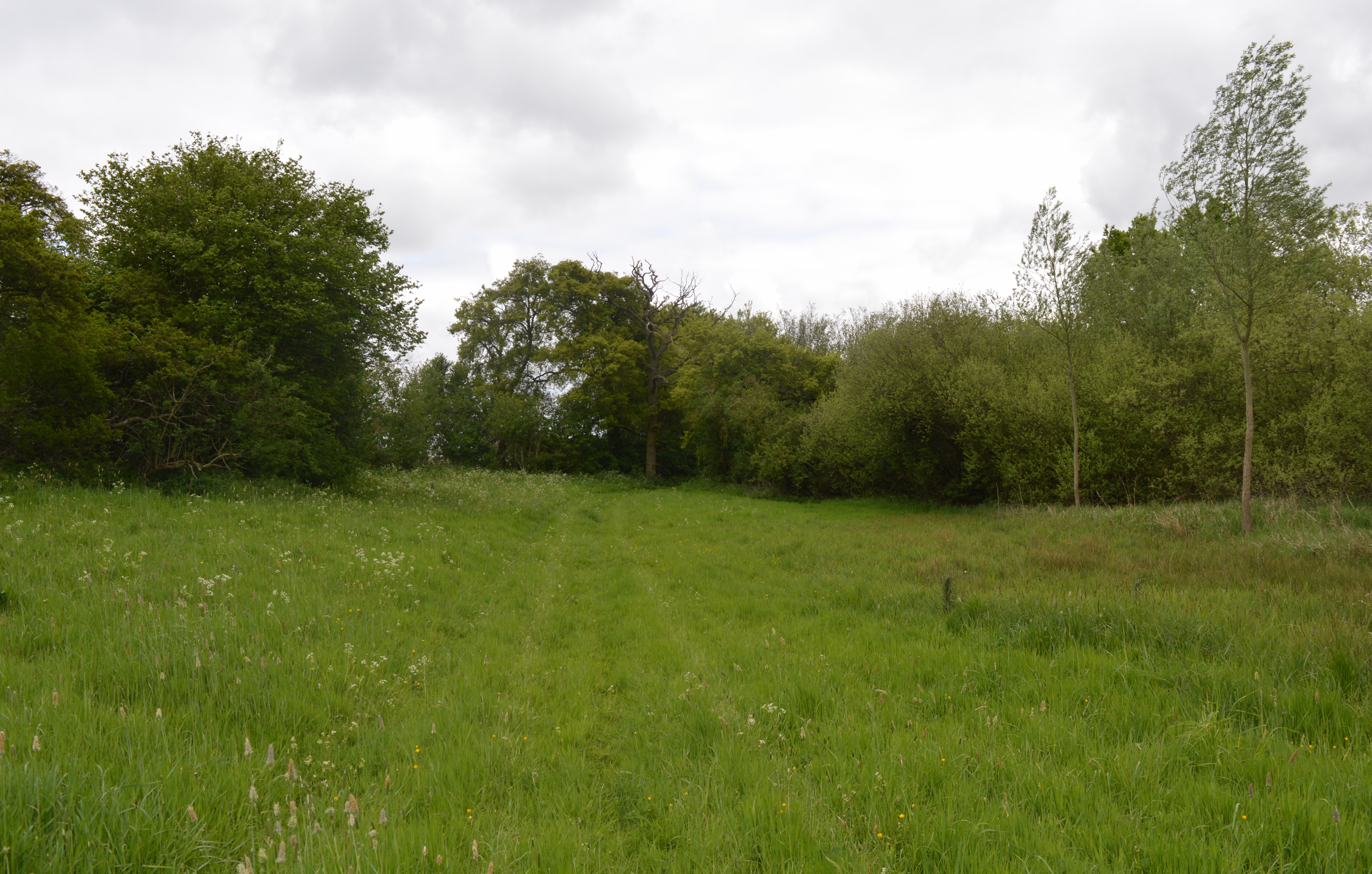
- Location of Ashdon Meadows.
- Area of search: Essex
- Grid reference: TL592402
- Interest: Biological
- Area: 1.5 ha (3.7 acres)
- Notification date: 1984
- Location map: Magic Map

Ashdon Meadows is a 1.5-hectare (3.7-acre) biological Site of Special Scientific Interest south of Ashdon in Essex.

The site is unimproved grassland which is used for hay growing, with some areas calcareous and others neutral. It is the only known example of grassland on chalky boulder clay in north-west Essex. Flora includes salad burnet, downy oat-grass and fen bedstraw.

There is access from the footpath between Water End and Plumtree Grove.
