= Debden Water SSSI =

Watercourse in Essex, England

Coordinates: 51.982°N 0.237°E

Debden Water
- Site of Special Scientific Interest
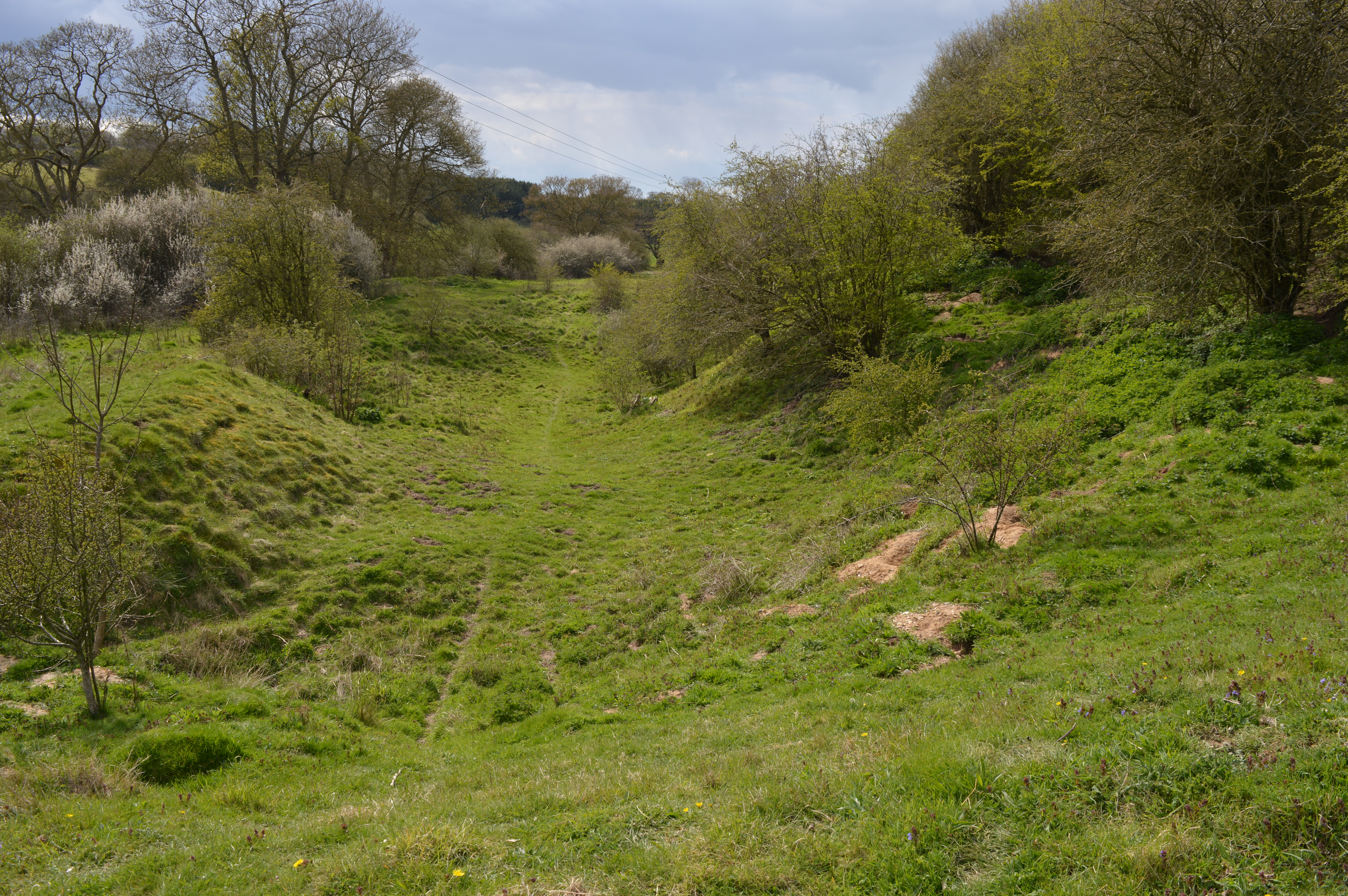
- Location of Debden Water.
- Area of search: Essex
- Grid reference: TL527342; TL 537340
- Interest: Biological
- Area: 20.9 ha (52 acres)
- Notification date: 1986
- Location map: Magic Map

Debden Water SSSI is a 20.9-hectare (52-acre) biological Site of Special Scientific Interest which comprises two stretches of Debden Water, a small tributary of the River Cam, and surrounding land. The site is on the eastern outskirts of Newport in Essex, where the stream joins the Cam.

The flood plain of the stream has tall fen vegetation, mainly common reed, while in some areas plants such as tussock sedge and lesser pond-sedge are locally dominant. Other habitats are neutral grassland, broad-leaved woodland and species-rich calcareous grassland. Locally rare plants are yellow figwort and woolly thistle. The site has a badger sett.

There are public footpaths both north and south of the stream.
