= Mammalian assemblage zone =

Collection of fossil mammal bones

In Pleistocene palaeontology, a mammalian assemblage zone (MAZ) is a collection of fossil bones of mammals.
