= Essex Wildlife Trust =

Wildlife conservation charity

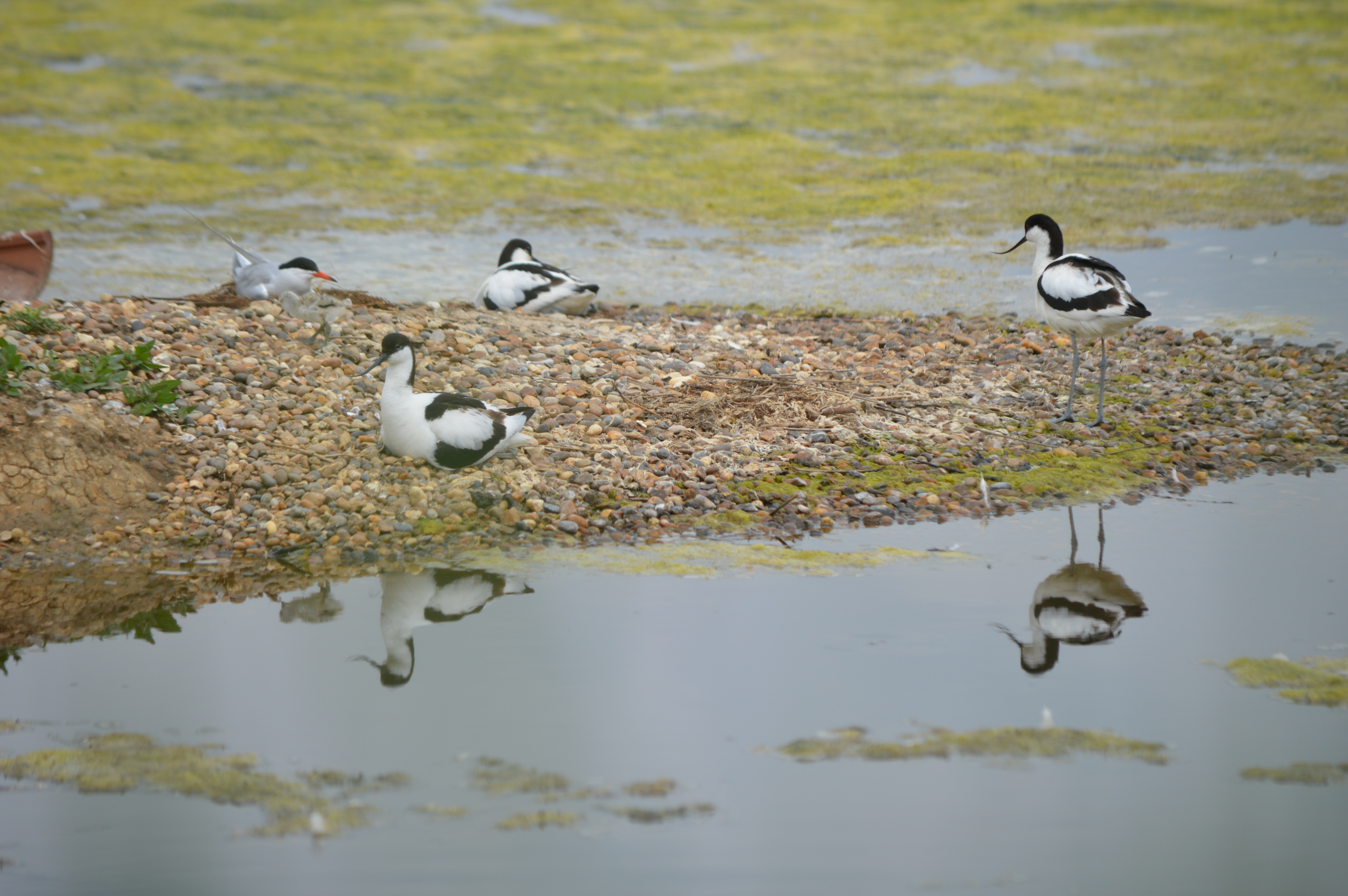
View from Blue House Farm bird hide

Essex Wildlife Trust is one of 46 Wildlife Trusts which cover the United Kingdom. Essex Wildlife Trust was founded in 1959, and it describes itself as Essex's leading conservation charity, which aims to protect wildlife for the future and the people of the county. As of 2026, it has 40,000 members, runs almost 100 nature reserves and 11 Nature Discovery Centres. (Note: The EWT states that it runs 87 nature reserves but only lists 55 on its web site. However, some sites listed as visitor centres are also nature reserves, and the EWT may also run other sites which are not listed.)

Essex has one of the longest coastlines of any English county, with saltmarshes, lagoons, mudflats, grazing marshes, reedbeds and shingle. Its ancient forests were formerly important to the local economy, with wood being used for fuel, construction and bark in the tanning industry. Coppicing is being re-introduced by the Trust to encourage woodland grasses, flowers, invertebrates and birds. A few grasslands on the heavy clays of south- and mid-Essex are still grazed according to traditional methods, supporting a mixture of pasture and fen. Some brownfield sites, often on contaminated soil, have populations of nationally scarce species, particularly invertebrates.

Essex Wildlife Trust's first site was Fingringhoe Wick, which was established in 1961; its visitor centre has views over the Colne Estuary. The largest site is the 400-hectare (990-acre) Hanningfield Reservoir, which has nationally important numbers of gadwalls and a rare moss. The smallest is Horndon Meadow at 0.8 hectares (2.0 acres); it is an unimproved hay meadow which has 80 flower species. The whole or part of 6 sites are Ramsar internationally important wetland sites, 29 are Sites of Special Scientific Interest, 3 are national nature reserves, 4 are Special Protection Areas, 2 are Special Areas of Conservation, 7 are Nature Conservation Review sites, 2 are a Geological Conservation Review sites, 2 are scheduled monuments and 7 are local nature reserves.

The trust has a wildlife magazine subscription which gives you three magazines a year, packed full of tips, ideas, events and updates about the nature reserves near the local area. Subscribers also receive a nature reserve guide to Essex, and a membership card that provides reserves free of charge.

== Nature reserves ==
=== Key ===
Classifications

- EWTVC = Essex Wildlife Trust Visitor Centre
- GCR = Geological Conservation Review
- LNR = Local nature reserve
- NCR = Nature Conservation Review
- NNR = National nature reserve
- Ramsar = Internationally important Ramsar wetland site
- SAC = Special Area of Conservation
- SM = Scheduled monument
- SPA = Special Protection Area
- SSSI = Site of Special Scientific Interest

Access

- BPA = Access only by prior arrangement with the EWT
- EWTO = EWT members only
- FP = Access to footpaths only
- PP = Access to part of the site
- YES = Free public access to all or most of the site

Site	Photograph	Area (Note: Unless stated otherwise, the area, location and public access are taken from the Essex Wildlife Trust page for each site.)	Location	Access	Classifications	Description
Abberton Reservoir	Abberton Reservoir	24.2 hectares (60 acres)	Colchester; 51.823°N 0.846°E; TL 962 177	YES	EWTVC, NCR, Ramsar, SPA, SSSI	The EWT runs the visitor centre for Essex and Suffolk Water's 716 hectare reservoir, which is internationally important for wintering wigeon, and nationally important for twelve other bird species. The small area run by the trust has new woodland with a bird hide, and there are two more hides over the reservoir.
Abbotts Hall Farm	Abbotts Hall Farm	282.0 hectares (697 acres)	Colchester; 51.796°N 0.845°E; TL 963 146	PP	NNR, Ramsar, SAC, SM, SPA, SSSI	This is the headquarters of the EWT, as well as a working farm which is managed to encourage wildlife. New seawalls have been built to create marshland, which has many fish, providing food for migrating birds. A new lake has also been constructed, and fields provide additional habitats for fauna such as skylarks.
Aubrey Buxton	Aubrey Buxton	9.7 hectares (24 acres)	Elsenham; 51.915°N 0.210°E; TL 521 264	YES		The site is woodland on a sandy and gravel soil, with meadows and six man-made ponds. Grassland plants include wild strawberries and common spotted orchids. There are birds such as nuthatches and woodpeckers. Black poplars, which are the county's rarest native tree, have been planted to replace trees lost to storm damage.
Bedfords Park	Bedfords Park Deer	87.0 hectares (215 acres)	Havering-atte-Bower; 51.608°N 0.194°E; TQ 520 922	YES	EWTVC, LNR	The London Borough of Havering owns and manages Bedfords Park, while the EWT manages the visitor centre. The site has wildflower meadows, diverse woodland, several ponds and a lake, as well as a herd of red deer. There are flora such as cuckoo flowers and ragged robins.
Belfairs Woodland Centre	Prittle Brook in Belfairs Wood	36.8 hectares (91 acres)	Leigh-on-Sea; 51.556°N 0.640°E; TQ 831 874	YES	EWTVC, LNR, SSSI	This is a small remnant of the ancient Hadleigh Great Wood. It is coppiced oak woodland on sands, gravels and clay, and one of the largest areas of old woodland in the south of the county. Plants include the rare broad-leaved helleborine.
Blue House Farm	Blue House Farm	242.8 hectares (600 acres)	North Fambridge; 51.642°N 0.681°E; TQ 856 971	FP	SSSI	This site has been grassland for the last 100 years, and it is grazed by cows and sheep. The site has ponds, creeks and ditches, and a 20 hectare field is flooded during the winter, providing feeding grounds for large numbers of wildfowl and wading birds, including around 2000 Brent geese.
Bradwell Shell Bank	Bradwell Shell Bank	N/Av	Bradwell-on-Sea; 51.735°N 0.946°E; TM 035 081	PP	NCR, Ramsar, SAC, SPA, SSSI	The site is a large area of saltmarsh, together with some 12 hectares (30 acres) of shell bank. Birds which breed on the shell bank include little terns and ringed plovers, and there are many species on the saltmarsh. There are flora such as yellow-horned poppies, grass-leaved oraches and rock samphires.
Brookes Nature Reserve	Brookes Nature Reserve	24.3 hectares (60 acres)	Halstead; 51.910°N 0.627°E; TL 808 268	YES	SSSI	The site is coppice woodland on chalky boulder clay. There is a variety of woodlands types, such as wet ash and maple, pedunculate Oak and hornbeam, and acid birch, ash and lime. The ground flora includes species which are locally uncommon, including greater butterfly-orchid and bird's-nest orchid. There is also a variety of butterflies, and ponds which have frogs and newts.
Chafford Gorges Nature Park	Chafford Gorges	80.9 hectares (200 acres)	Grays; 51.490°N 0.286°E; TQ 588 793	YES	EWTVC, GCR, SSSI	This site has lakes, woodland and meadows. There are common spotted, bee and bird's nest orchids, and long-eared and common pipistrelle bats. Two areas are Sites of Special Scientific Interest: Grays Thurrock Chalk Pit has been designated for its biological interest, and Lion Pit for geological interest.
Chigborough Lakes	Chigborough Lakes	18.6 hectares (46 acres)	Maldon; 51.745°N 0.717°E; TL 876 086	YES		This area of former gravel pits has diverse habitats, lakes, marshes, willow carr, grazed grassland and scrub. More than 120 species of bird have been recorded, out of which more than 40 have bred, including great crested grebes, grey herons and little egrets. There are eleven species of willow and several of orchid.
Cockaynes Wood	Cockaynes Wood	20.2 hectares (50 acres)	Wivenhoe; 51.856°N 0.981°E; TM 054 217	PP		Cockaynes Wood is ancient, and was listed in the Domesday Book. The nature reserve also includes Villa Wood and more open areas, with heathland, meadows, and water-filled former quarries. Wildlife includes a rare weevil and birds including barn owls.
Colne Point	Colne Point	276.4 hectares (683 acres)	St Osyth; 51.771°N 1.054°E; TM 108 125	YES	NCR, NNR, Ramsar, SSSI	The site is shingle surrounding saltmarsh, and Ray Creek flows through it. It is a breeding ground for many birds, and a feeding area for migrants. There are many invertebrates which are on the IUCN Red List of Threatened Species, and flora include the nationally rare golden samphire and small cord-grass.
Copperas Wood	Copperas Wood	13.8 hectares (34 acres)	Harwich; 51.939°N 1.200°E; TM 200 315	YES	SSSI	This is ancient sweet chestnut and hornbeam coppice. The Great Storm of 1987 caused severe damage, and some areas have been left to regenerate naturally. Around 100 bird species have been observed, out of which 43 are nesting, and there are 23 butterfly species and over 300 of moths.
Cranham Marsh	Cranham Marsh	13.0 hectares (32 acres)	Cranham; 51.547°N 0.258°E; TQ 567 856	YES	LNR	The habitats on the site are woodland, wet meadow, marsh and fen. There are three small woods, including Spring Wood, which has species indicative of ancient woodland. Insects include a rare bee, Macropis europaea, and 23 species of butterfly have been recorded.
Crowsheath Wood	Crowsheath Wood	8.1 hectares (20 acres)	Downham; 51.641°N 0.494°E; TQ 727 964	YES		The wood has many mature oak trees, with coppiced areas mainly of hornbeam, together with other trees such as ash and field maple. There are ponds in the centre of the site where lesser spearwort grows. Flowers include bluebell and wood anemone, and there are birds typical of broadleaved woodland.
Danbury Ridge	Danbury Ridge	101.2 hectares (250 acres)	Danbury; 51.729°N 0.590°E; TL 790 065	YES	SSSI	The site includes several areas in two different SSSIs, Danbury Common and Woodham Walter Common. Habitats include woodland, a bog area which has sphagnum moss, marsh, a pond and heathland. Dormice are common in the reserves.
Fingringhoe Wick	Fingringhoe Wick	48.6 hectares (120 acres)	Fingringhoe; 51.835°N 0.971°E; TM 048 193	YES	EWTVC, NCR, Ramsar, SSSI	These former gravel quarries were the Trust's first reserve, established in 1961. Habitats are the Colne Estuary, gorse heathland, grassland, reedbeds and ponds. There are nearly 200 species of birds and 350 of flowering plants, together with many dragonflies, damselflies and butterflies.
Fobbing Marsh	Fobbing Marsh	75.7 hectares (187 acres)	Fobbing; 51.534°N 0.495°E; TQ 731 846	YES		The site is mainly grazing marshes, but there are also areas of rough grassland, saltmarsh, seawalls and reedbed. Flowering plants include hairy buttercup, knotted hedge-parsley and the nationally rare least lettuce. There are breeding birds such as corn buntings and yellow wagtails.
Gernon Bushes	Gernon Bushes	32.0 hectares (79 acres)	Epping; 51.706°N 0.138°E; TL 478 030	YES	SSSI, NCR	This site is ancient coppice, with old hornbeam pollards, and many ponds which were created for gravel extraction. There are areas of marsh with large patches of the unusual marsh fern, and other plants include marsh marigold and ragged robin.
Great Holland Pits	Great Holland Pits	16.2 hectares (40 acres)	Great Holland; 51.826°N 1.197°E; TM 204 190	YES		This area of former gravel pits has grassland, ancient woodland, ponds and wet depressions. There are water birds such as kingfishers, coots and little grebes, and flowering plants include moschatels and carline thistles.
Gunners Park and Shoebury Ranges	Shoebury Ranges	25.0 hectares (62 acres)	Shoeburyness; 51.523°N 0.785°E; TQ 932 841	PP	LNR, SM, SSSI	Gunners Park, which is named for its former military use, has over twelve habitats, including coastal grassland and ancient sand dunes. Rare insects include sandwich click beetles, while there are unusual plants such as bulbous meadow-grass. There is a wide range of migrating birds.
Hanningfield Reservoir	Hanningfield Reservoir	400 hectares (990 acres)	Chelmsford; 51.646°N 0.492°E; TQ 725 971	YES	EWTVC, SSSI	The reservoir has a nationally important population of gadwalls, and it also has significant numbers of pochards, teal, tufted ducks and pintails. The chalk sludge lagoon has several unusual plants, and there is a rare moss Brachythecium mildeanum at the foot of the southern dam.
Horndon Meadow	Horndon Meadow	0.8 hectares (2.0 acres)	Stanford-le-Hope; 51.540°N 0.410°E; TQ 672 851	YES		This site is an unimproved hay meadow, which has around eighty flower species, such as green-winged orchids, yellow rattles, musk mallows and black knapweeds. Other plants include adder's tongue ferns.
Howlands Marsh	Howlands Marsh	29.9 hectares (74 acres)	St Osyth; 51.811°N 1.067°E; TM 115 169	YES	NCR, Ramsar, SPA, SSSI	This site is marshy grassland, which is low lying and hummocky, and divided by water channels. There are also areas of saltmarsh, which have sea wormwood and golden samphire. Breeding birds include reed warblers, skylarks, lapwings and reed buntings.
Hunsdon Mead (Note: Hunsdon Mead is managed jointly by the Essex and Herts and Middlesex Wildlife Trusts.)	Hunsdon Mead	27.5 hectares (68 acres)	Harlow; 51.783°N 0.059°E; TL 421 114	YES	SSSI	This is unimproved grassland which is subject to winter flooding. Notable grass species include meadow brome and the quaking grass Briza media, and there are other unusual flora such as pepper saxifrage and green-winged orchid.
Ingrebourne Valley	Ingrebourne Valley	261 hectares (640 acres)	Hornchurch; 51.530°N 0.208°E; TQ 532 835	YES	EWTVC, LNR, SSSI	The EWT manages the visitor centre for this site, which is run by Havering Council. The site has a wide range of habitats, rough grassland, woodland, marshes, river, reedbeds and wet grazing. There are fauna such as great crested newts, slowworms and harvest mice.
Iron Latch	Iron Latch	4.3 hectares (11 acres)	Eight Ash Green; 51.897°N 0.8328°E; TL 950 259	YES		The site consists of areas of species-rich grassland and ash woodland. Bird's foot trefoil provides food for common blue butterflies, purple hairstreaks, and other butterflies. Nightingales nest in the trees and hedges.
John Weston Nature Reserve	John Weston	3.6 hectares (8.9 acres)	Walton-on-the-Naze; 51.873°N 1.2903°E; TM 266 245	YES		This site is named after its former warden, who died in 1984. It has rough grassland, blackthorn and bramble scrub and four ponds. Nesting birds include the lesser and common whitethroat, and there are flora such as slender thistle, pepper saxifrage and fenugreek.
Langdon Nature Reserve	Langdon Nature Reserve	210.0 hectares (519 acres)	Basildon; 51.562°N 0.3942°E; TQ 660 875	YES	EWTVC, SSSI	This site has a wildlife garden, woodland, meadows and lakes. Over 350 species of flowering plants have been recorded, and 30 butterflies including white admirals, green hairstreaks, marbled whites and grizzled skippers.
Lexden Gathering Grounds	Lexden Gathering Grounds	8.9 hectares (22 acres)	Colchester; 51.893°N 0.8555°E; TL 965 254	YES		The site is mainly woodland with some marsh, meadow and open rides. One area has semi-natural birch and ash woods, and the marsh has moschatel and mature hazel and alder coppice. There are badgers and foxes, and butterflies including meadow browns and small coppers.
Lion Creek and Lower Raypits	Lion Creek	65.2 hectares (161 acres)	Canewdon; 51.619°N 0.776°E; TQ 923 948	YES	SSSI	The former creek has been cut off from the Crouch Estuary by a seawall, and it has salt marsh plants such as golden samphire and sea-spurrey. Lower Raypits has a variety of pasture, salt marsh and intertidal habitats, with nationally scarce plants such as beaked tasselweed, sea barley, grass vetchling and curved hard-grass. Invertebrates include Roesel's bush-cricket.
Little Haven	Little Haven	37.2 hectares (92 acres)	Thundersley; 51.571°N 0.6075°E; TQ 808 890	YES		This site has diverse habitats of woodland, meadows, scrub and hedges. The main trees are sessile oaks, hornbeams and sweet chestnut, and plants such as wood sorrel and are indicators of ancient woodland. The reserve is one of only 25 in the county where the rare heath fritillary is well established.
Little Waltham Meadows	Little Waltham Meadows	8.9 hectares (22 acres)	Little Waltham; 51.779°N 0.4818°E; TL 713 119	YES		The site is wet and dry meadows on the bank of the River Chelmer, which are grazed to restore them to their previous state. There are grassland plants such as saxifrage, bee orchids and yellow oat-grass. Tawny owls and sparrowhawks hunt in the meadows and ancient hedgerows.
Maldon Wick	Maldon Wick	6.1 hectares (15 acres)	Maldon; 51.720°N 0.6653°E; TL 842 057	YES		This is a 2.4-kilometre (1.5-mile) linear site along the route of the former railway line between Maldon and Woodham Ferrers, and it is mainly on embankment. There are many breeding birds, and 28 species of butterflies and 17 of dragonfly have been recorded. Flowering plants include moschatels and sweet violets.
The Naze	The Naze	45 hectares (110 acres)	Walton-on-the-Naze; 51.868°N 1.288°E; TM 264 238	YES	EWTVC, GCR, SSSI	This coastal site has a variety of terrestrial and marine habitats, and many migrating and nesting birds, such as dark-bellied brent geese, sedge warblers, barn owls and common whitethroats. The cliff is eroding at one to two metres a year.
Newland Grove	Newland Grove in the snow	3.2 hectares (7.9 acres)	Chelmsford; 51.770°N 0.4856°E; TL 716 108	YES		The site is rough grassland on the bank of the River Chelmer, with areas of woodland and thorn thicket. More than 230 plant species have been recorded, including St John's wort, hairy violet and musk mallow. Birds include several species of warbler, and 23 of butterflies.
Oakfield Wood	Oakfield Wood	2.8 hectares (6.9 acres)	Wrabness; 51.940°N 1.151°E; TM 167 315	YES		This is former farmland which is being converted into a "green burial ground", overlooking the Stour Estuary. A native broadleaved tree is planted for each burial with a wooden plaque at the base. When the burial ground is full, it will be managed by the trust as a nature reserve.
Oxley Meadow	Oxley Meadow	3.2 hectares (7.9 acres)	Tiptree; 51.801°N 0.779°E; TL 917 149	YES		The site has two meadows which are rich in flowers, including many green winged orchids and adderstongue ferns. There is also a variety of common butterfly species, and hedgerows provide nesting sites for birds such as the lesser whitethroat.
Phyllis Currie	Phyllis Currie	8.9 hectares (22 acres)	Great Leighs; 51.836°N 0.499°E; TL 723 182	YES		This site is named after Mrs Phyllis Currie, who bequeathed it to the trust. It has diverse habitats, with grassland, a lake, woodland and ditches. Birds include kingfishers and grey herons, and 23 species of butterflies and 13 of dragonflies and damselflies have been recorded.
Pound Wood	Pound Wood	22.3 hectares (55 acres)	Thundersley; 51.569°N 0.619°E; TQ 816 888	YES		Much of this site is ancient woodland, with some old secondary woodland. Trees include sweet chestnut, aspen and the wild service tree. There are a number of dells and ponds.
Roding Valley Meadows	Roding Valley Meadows	64.6 hectares (160 acres)	Chigwell; 51.629°N 0.065°E; TQ 430 943	YES	LNR, SSSI	The meadows are bordered by the River Roding. They form one of the largest areas of grassland in Essex which are traditionally managed as hay meadows, flood meadows and marshland. Plants include the largest beds in Essex of the rare brown sedge.
Roman River Valley	Roman River Valley	17.8 hectares (44 acres)	Layer de la Haye; 51.853°N 0.866°E; TL 975 211	YES		This wetland site along the Roman River has ancient woodland and marshes. Aquatic plants include the uncommon small teasel, and there are flowering plants such as yellow archangel and moschatel.
Rushy Mead	Rushy Mead	4.6 hectares (11 acres)	Bishop's Stortford; 51.855°N 0.172°E; TL 497 196	YES		The site has areas of sedges and reeds with water near the surface all year. They provide protection for snipe and water rails in the winter, and sedge and reed warblers in the summer. The northern part is alder woodland with some ash and willow. In drier areas there is chalk grassland which supports a wide variety of wild flowers.
Sandylay and Moat Woods	Sandylay and Moat Woods	7.5 hectares (19 acres)	Great Leighs; 51.829°N 0.514°E; TL 733 175	YES		These adjacent woods are mainly coppiced small-leaved lime, with a small stream and many flowering plants, including wood anemones, sweet violets, spurge laurel, stinking iris and early purple orchid.
Sawbridgeworth Marsh	Sawbridgeworth Marsh	8.9 hectares (22 acres)	Sawbridgeworth; 51.821°N 0.1635°E; TL 492 158	YES	SSSI	The site is a river valley marsh close to the River Stort, which has a varied wetland flora. Grazing and cutting of the marsh in rotation maintains biological diversity. Uncommon plants include marsh willowherb, marsh valerian and marsh arrow-grass, and drainage ditches and two ponds have a rich aquatic life.
Sergeants Orchard	Sergeants Orchard	3.2 hectares (7.9 acres)	Mount Bures; 51.943°N 0.775°E; TL 908 308	PP		The site consists of an old orchard in a long narrow field, another narrow field to the west and a larger one to the east. The western field has been planted with fruit trees and the eastern one with a conservation grass mix. A rare bee, bombus muscorum, has been found on the site.
Shadwell Wood	Shadwell Wood	7.1 hectares (18 acres)	Saffron Waldon; 52.048°N 0.292°E; TL 572 413	YES	SSSI	This is oak and ash woodland, interspersed with coppiced hazel and maple. Diverse flowering plants include oxlips, wood anemones, herb paris, and early purple and common spotted orchids.
Shotgate Thickets	Shotgate Thickets	3.2 hectares (7.9 acres)	Wickford; 51.618°N 0.553°E; TQ 768 940	YES		This site on the north bank of the River Crouch has oak woodland, two ponds, rough grassland and thorn thickets. Fauna include great crested newts, water voles, and over seventy bird species. More than a hundred plant species have been recorded, such as golden dock and dyer's greenweed.
Shut Heath Wood	Shut Heath Wood	20.2 hectares (50 acres)	Great Totham; 51.788°N 0.685°E; TL 853 133	YES		Over half this site is managed as farmland, and the rest is ancient oak woodland with coppiced sweet chestnut and hornbeam. The understorey is ash, elder and hazel. Invertebrates include damselflies, dragonflies, glow-worms and wood ants.
Skippers Island	Skippers Island	94.3 hectares (233 acres)	Walton-on-the-Naze; 51.872°N 1.221°E; TM 218 242	BPA		The highest part of the island has thorn thickets, separated by grassy rides. The lowest land is saltmarsh, and there is also extensive rough pasture with brackish pools. Flora include sea hog's fennel and lax-flowered sea-lavender, and there are breeding birds such as shelducks and oystercatchers.
Stanford Warren	Stanford Warren	16.6 hectares (41 acres)	Stanford-le-Hope; 51.505°N 0.429°E; TQ 687 812	YES		This former gravel quarry is bisected by the River Hassenbrook. It has one of the largest reedbeds in the county, together with rough grassland and marshes. The bird life is diverse, including water rails, grey wagtails and bearded tits.
Stow Maries Halt	Stow Maries Halt	2.2 hectares (5.4 acres)	Stow Maries; 51.661°N 0.652°E; TQ 835 991	YES		The former Stow St Mary Halt railway station has marshes, a pond and scrub, together with adjoining pasture which is also part of the reserve. Butterflies include purple and white-letter hairstreaks, and there are flowers such as common fleabane and wild carrot.
Thorndon Countryside Centre	Thorndon Countryside Centre	200 hectares (500 acres)	Brentwood; 51.560°N 0.316°E; TQ 605 915	YES	EWTVC, SSSI	The EWT runs the visitor centre for Thorndon Country Park, which is managed by Essex County Council. The park has diverse habitats, with ancient woodland, a meadow, a marsh, parkland and ponds. Mature trees include large oak and hornbeam pollards.
Thrift Wood	Thrift Wood	19.4 hectares (48 acres)	Bicknacre; 51.685°N 0.588°E; TL 790 017	YES	SSSI	The site is an ancient semi-natural wood on acid soil. Wild service trees and elders are found in the shrub layer, and a pond has a raised sphagnum bog. Twenty species of butterfly have been recorded.
Thurrock Thameside Nature Park	Thurrock Thameside Nature Park	50 hectares (120 acres) (Note: As of May 2016, the Trust states that Thurrock Thameside Nature Park is being expanded from 120 to 845 acres.)	Stanford-le-Hope; 51.499°N 0.442°E; TQ 696 806	YES	EWTVC	The park is next to the River Thames and it has internationally important numbers of ringed plovers and avocets, and nationally important numbers of grey plovers and dunlins. Mammals include water voles, Britain's fastest declining species, and there are amphibians such as the great crested newt.
Tile Wood	Tile Wood	6.5 hectares (16 acres)	Thundersley; 51.571°N 0.619°E; TQ 816 890	YES		The wood is ancient, having been mentioned in the Anglo-Saxon period. The main trees are sessile oak, hornbeam and sweet chestnut. Ground flora include wood sorrel, bluebells and wood-rush.
Tiptree Heath	Tiptree Heath	24.3 hectares (60 acres)	Tiptree; 51.799°N 0.729°E; TL 883 147	YES	SSSI	This is the largest surviving area of heathland in Essex, and has a number of plants rare in the county. It is dominated by heather and bent grass. A small herd of Dexter cattle help to control the growth of invasive scrub.
Tollesbury Wick	Tollesbury Wick	242.9 hectares (600 acres)	Tollesbury; 51.757°N 0.853°E; TL 970 103	FP		This is coastal freshwater marsh which is grazed by sheep, and is worked by traditional methods which encourage wildlife. Areas of ungrazed rough pasture have badgers, and field voles and pygmy shrews are hunted by hen harriers and short-eared owls.
Two Tree Island	Two Tree Island	259 hectares (640 acres)	Leigh-on-Sea; 51.536°N 0.629°E; TQ 824 852	YES	NCR,NNR, SSSI	Mudflats provide food for wildfowl such as brent geese, and waders such as dunlins and grey plovers. There are also areas of saltmarsh, grassland, lagoons, scrub and reedbeds. Butterflies include the marbled white, small skipper and Essex skipper.
Warley Place	Warley Place	10.1 hectares (25 acres)	Brentwood; 51.592°N 0.284°E; TQ 583 906	YES		In the late nineteenth and early twentieth centuries this site was the garden of the leading horticulturalist, Ellen Willmott, who planted many plants from all over the world, some of which still survive. There is a line of mature sweet chestnuts, and flowers including daffodils, snowdrops and crocuses.
Weeleyhall Wood	Weeleyhall Wood	13.6 hectares (34 acres)	Weeley; 51.845°N 1.132°E; TM 158 209	YES	SSSI	This site has a variety of woodland types, reflecting diverse soils. It is mainly pedunculate oak over a layer of coppice hazel and sweet chestnut planted in the nineteenth century. There are two ponds and species-rich damp, grassy rides.
West Wood	West Wood	23.5 hectares (58 acres)	Thaxted; 51.975°N 0.363°E; TL 623 333	YES	SSSI	The site is ancient woodland on chalky boulder clay and sandy loam. It was mainly elm, but this has died and the wood regenerated naturally with ash. Bramble and dog's mercury dominate the ground layer, with a rich variety of plants in wetter areas, such as oxlip and meadow-sweet. There are many species of birds and butterflies, and four ponds which have great crested newts, dragonflies and damselflies.
Westhouse Wood	Anemone nemerosa in Westhouse Wood	2.8 hectares (6.9 acres)	Colchester; 51.908°N 0.869°E; TL 974 271	YES		The wood is mainly coppiced hazel, and other tree include small-leaved lime, crab apple, oak, ash, sweet chestnut, field maple and rowan. There are flowering plants such as wood anemones and foxgloves.
Woodham Fen	Woodham Fen	8.1 hectares (20 acres)	South Woodham Ferrers; 51.647°N 0.597°E; TQ 798 975	YES	SSSI	The site lies between two tidal creeks which run into the River Crouch. It has saltmarsh and rough grassland with an unusual transition zone between them. Birds include reed buntings, yellow wagtails and meadow pipits, and there are common lizards and slowworms.
Wrabness	Wrabness	24.3 hectares (60 acres)	Wrabness; 51.940°N 1.151°E; TM 167 315	YES	LNR	This site has grassland, marsh, scrub and woodland. It has a diverse bird life, such as yellowhammers, common whitethroats, song thrushes and short-eared owls. There are also winter visitors including black-tailed godwits, grey plovers and turnstones.

== See also ==
- List of Sites of Special Scientific Interest in Essex
- List of Local Nature Reserves in Essex

== Sources ==
- Ratcliffe, Derek (1977). A Nature Conservation Review. Vol. 2. Cambridge, UK: Cambridge University Press. ISBN 0-521-21403-3.
