= Fobbing Marsh =

Nature reserve in Essex, England

Coordinates: 51.534°N 0.495°E

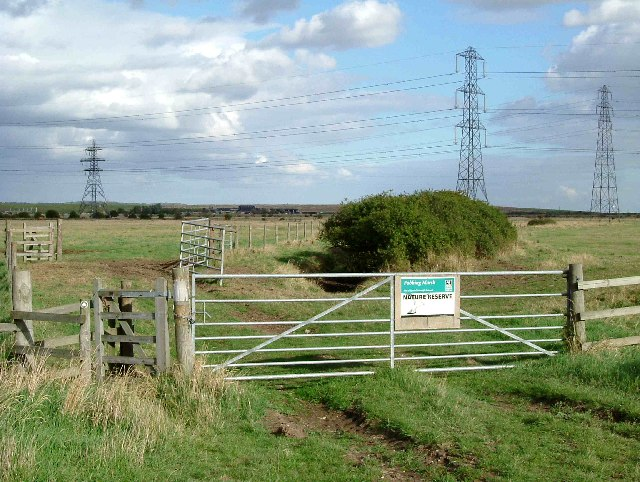
- Interactive map of Fobbing Marsh
- Type: Nature reserve
- Location: Fobbing, Essex
- OS grid: TQ 731 846
- Area: 75.7 hectares (187 acres)
- Manager: Essex Wildlife Trust

Fobbing Marsh is a 75.7-hectare (187-acre) nature reserve east of Fobbing in Essex. It is managed by the Essex Wildlife Trust.

The site is mainly grazing marshes, but there are also areas of rough grassland, saltmarsh, seawalls and reedbed. Flowering plants include hairy buttercup, knotted hedge-parsley and the nationally rare least lettuce. There are breeding birds such as Corn buntings and yellow wagtails.

There is access by a footpath from Marsh Lane.
