= Cranham Marsh =

Nature reserve in Cranham, London, England

Coordinates: 51.5475°N 0.2585°E

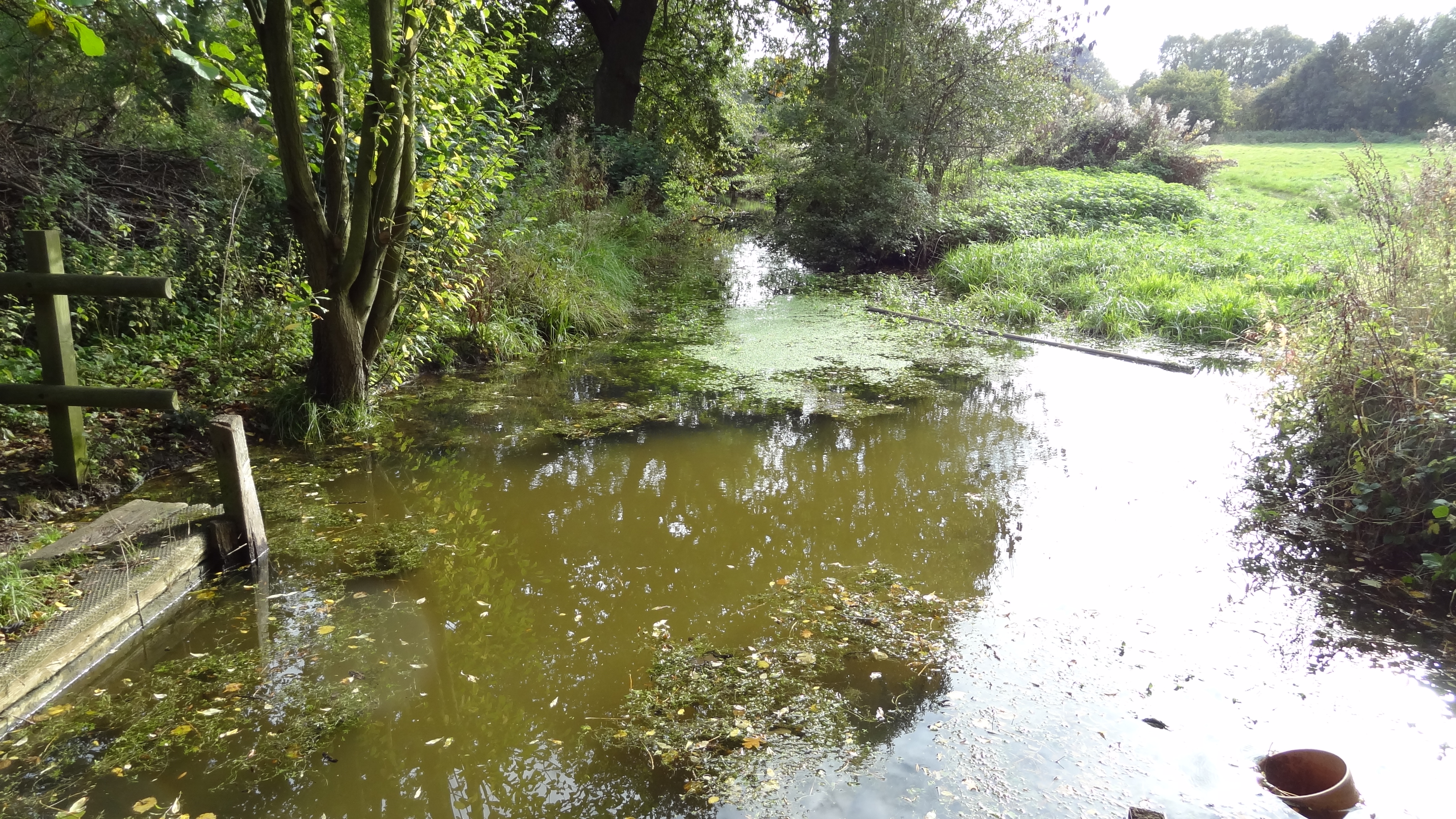
- Interactive map of Cranham Marsh
- Type: Local Nature Reserve
- Location: Cranham, London Borough of Havering
- OS grid: TQ 567 856
- Area: 15.3 hectares (38 acres)
- Manager: Essex Wildlife Trust

Cranham Marsh is an English 15.3 hectare Local Nature Reserve and a Site of Metropolitan Importance for Nature Conservation in Cranham in the London Borough of Havering. It is owned by Havering Council and managed by the Essex Wildlife Trust.

The habitats on the site are woodland, wet meadow and marsh, and it has one of the few areas of fen to survive in the area. There are three small woods, including Spring Wood, which has species indicative of ancient woodland. Locally uncommon plants in wetland areas include southern marsh-orchid, fine-leaved water-dropwort and golden dock. Insects include a rare bee, Macropis europaea, and 23 species of butterfly have been recorded. It is also a good site for water voles. A tributary of the River Ingrebourne runs through the site.

There is access by footpaths from Park Drive and The Chase.
