= Horndon Meadow =

Nature reserve in Essex, England

Coordinates: 51.54°N 0.410°E

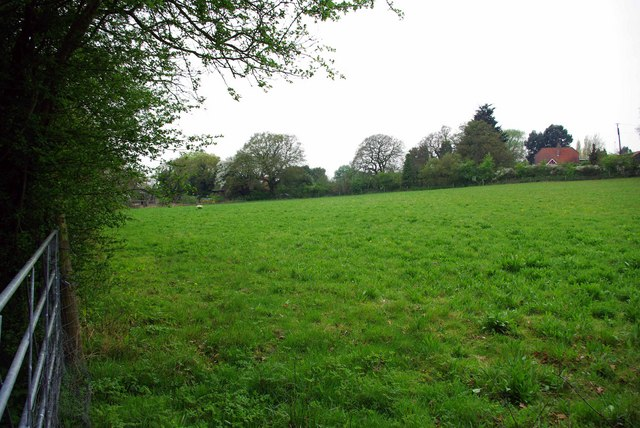
- Interactive map of Horndon Meadow
- Type: Nature reserve
- Location: Stanford-le-Hope, Essex
- OS grid: TQ 672 851
- Area: 0.8 hectares (2.0 acres)
- Manager: Essex Wildlife Trust

Horndon Meadow is a 0.8-hectare (2.0-acre) nature reserve north of Stanford-le-Hope in Essex. It is managed by the Essex Wildlife Trust.

This site is an unimproved hay meadow, which has around eighty flower species, such as green-winged orchids, yellow rattles, musk mallows and black knapweeds. Other plants include adder's tongue ferns.

There is access from South Hill, at Tyelands Farm.
