= Oakfield Wood =

Nature reserve in Essex, England

Coordinates: 51.94°N 1.151°E

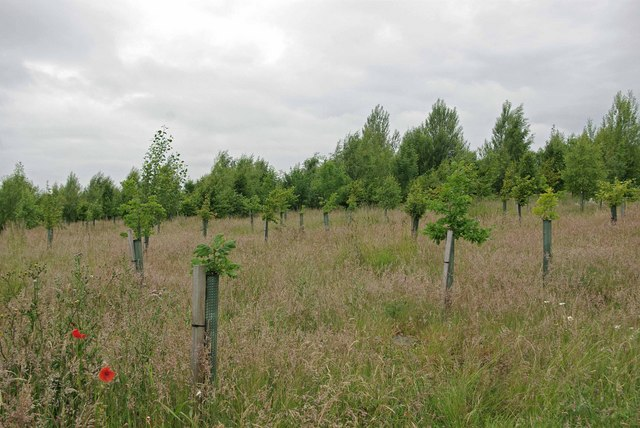
- Interactive map of Oakfield Wood
- Type: Nature reserve
- Location: Wrabness, Essex
- OS grid: TM 167 315
- Area: 2.8 hectares (6.9 acres)
- Manager: Essex Wildlife Trust

Oakfield Wood is a 2.8-hectare (6.9-acre) nature reserve west of Wrabness in Essex. It is managed by the Essex Wildlife Trust.

This is former farmland which is being converted into a "green burial ground", overlooking the Stour Estuary. A native broadleaved tree is planted for each burial with a wooden plaque at the base. When the burial ground is full, it will be managed by the trust as a nature reserve.

There is access to the site carpark from Wheatsheaf Lane by a track which leads through Wrabness Nature Reserve carpark.
