= The Naze SSSI =

Protected area in Essex, England

Coordinates: 51.863°N 1.288°E

The Naze
- Site of Special Scientific Interest
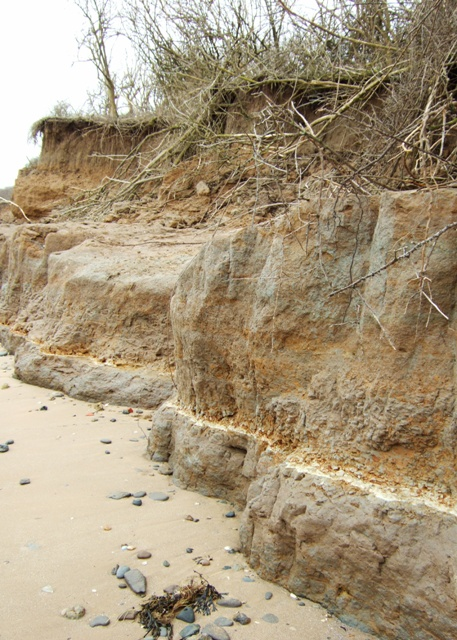
- Location of The Naze.
- Area of search: Essex
- Grid reference: TM 266237
- Interest: Geological
- Area: 22.0 ha (54 acres)
- Notification date: 1986
- Location map: Magic Map

The Naze SSSI is a 22 hectare geological Site of Special Scientific Interest on The Naze peninsula north of Walton-on-the-Naze in Essex. It is a Geological Conservation Review site both for its Pleistocene fossils and for its birds. It is part of The Naze Nature Reserve, which is managed by the Essex Wildlife Trust.

The citation for this site states that the cliffs expose many invertebrate fossils from the early Pleistocene Red Crag Formation, and it is the type site for the Waltonian, the first British stage of the Pleistocene. However, some authorities date the Red Crag and the Waltonian to the Piacenzian, the last stage of the preceding Pliocene.

The site is also significant for its Eocene (56 to 34 million years ago) plant and avian fossils, and it is described by Natural England as "of considerable importance in the study of bird evolution".

The beach below the cliff is open to the public.
