= Villawood (disambiguation) =

Villawood may refer to:

- Villawood, Australia
- Villawood Immigration Detention Centre, Villawood, New South Wales, Australia
- Villawood railway station, Villawood, New South Wales, Australia

== See also ==
- Villa Wood, Cockaynes Wood, Essex, UK
- Valla Wood, a nature reserve in Linköping, Östergötland, Sweden
- Villa (disambiguation)
- Wood (disambiguation)
