= Shotgate Thickets =

Nature reserve in Essex, England

Coordinates: 51.618°N 0.553°E

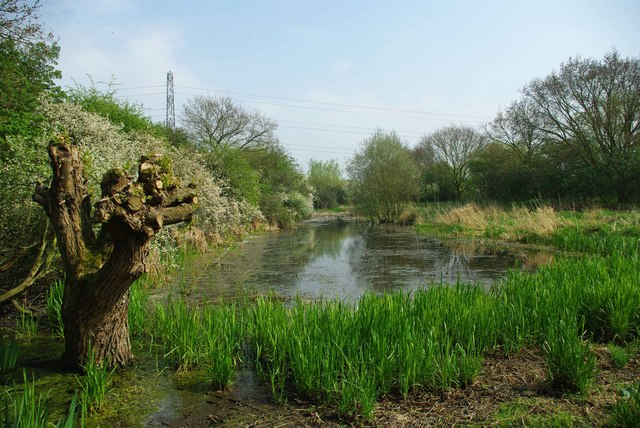
- Interactive map of Shotgate Thickets
- Type: Nature reserve
- Location: Wickford, Essex
- OS grid: TQ 768 940
- Area: 3.2 hectares (7.9 acres)
- Manager: Essex Wildlife Trust

Shotgate Thickets is a 3.2-hectare (7.9-acre) nature reserve east of Wickford in Essex. It is managed by the Essex Wildlife Trust.

This site on the north bank of the River Crouch has oak woodland, two ponds, rough grassland and thorn thickets. Fauna include great crested newts, water voles, and over seventy bird species. More than a hundred plant species have been recorded, such as golden dock and dyer's greenweed.

There is access by a footpath along the river bank from Battlesbridge.
