= Skipper's Island =

Island in Essex, England

Coordinates: 51.872°N 1.221°E

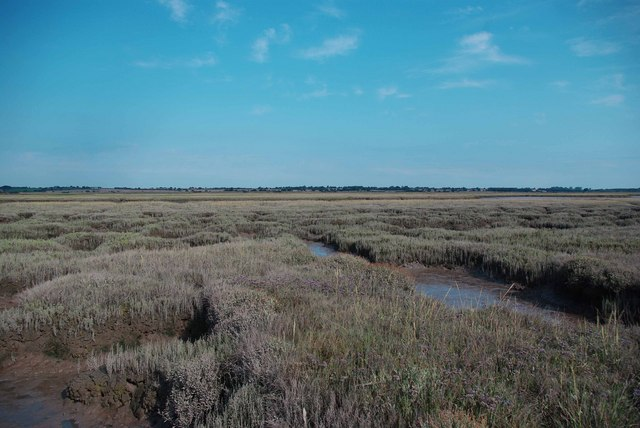
- Interactive map of Skipper's Island
- Type: Nature reserve
- Location: Kirby-le-Soken, Essex, England
- OS grid: TM 218 242
- Area: 94.3 hectares (233 acres)
- Manager: Essex Wildlife Trust

Skipper's Island is a 94.3-hectare (233-acre) nature reserve north of Kirby-le-Soken in Essex, England. It is owned and managed by the Essex Wildlife Trust.

The highest part of the island has thorn thickets, separated by grassy rides. The lowest land is saltmarsh, and there is also extensive rough pasture with brackish pools. Flora include sea hog's fennel and lax-flowered sea-lavender, and there are breeding birds such as shelducks and oystercatchers.

The island is connected to the mainland by two causeways, and access is only by prior arrangement with the trust.
