= Newland Grove =

Nature reserve in Essex, England

Coordinates: 51.77°N 0.486°E

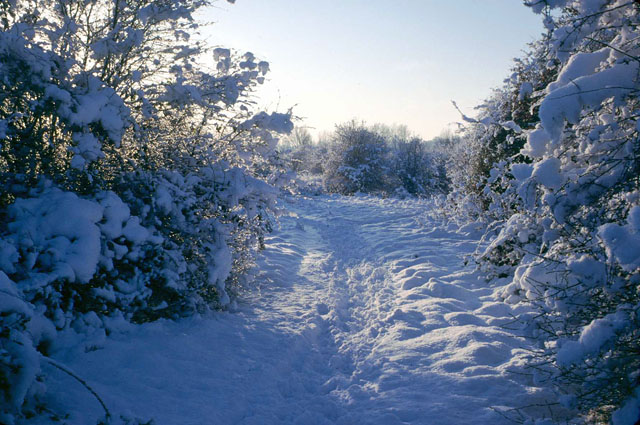
- Interactive map of Newland Grove
- Type: Nature reserve
- Location: Chelmsford, Essex
- OS grid: TL 716 108
- Area: 3.2 hectares (7.9 acres)
- Manager: Essex Wildlife Trust

Newland Grove is a 3.2-hectare (7.9-acre) nature reserve north of Chelmsford in Essex. It is managed by the Essex Wildlife Trust.

The site is rough grassland on the bank of the River Chelmer, with areas of woodland and thorn thicket. Over 230 plant species have been recorded, including St John's wort, hairy violet and musk mallow. Birds include several species of warbler, and 23 of butterflies.

There is access from the west side of a roundabout at the junction of Essex Regiment Way and Channels Drive.
