= West Wood, Little Sampford =

Nature reserve in Essex, England

Coordinates: 51.974°N 0.357°E

West Wood
- Site of Special Scientific Interest
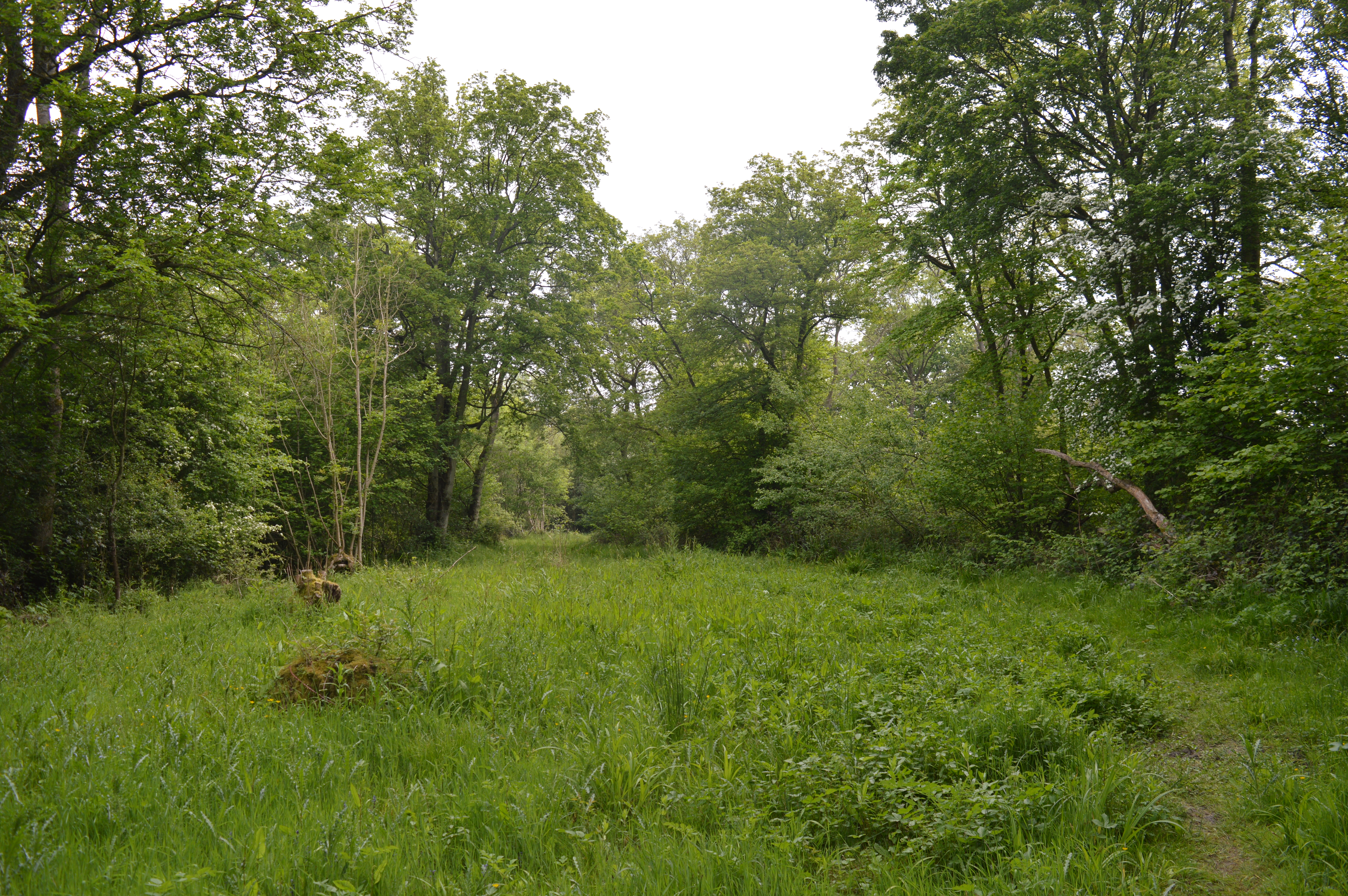
- Location of West Wood.
- Area of search: Essex
- Grid reference: TL 622333
- Interest: Biological
- Area: 23.6 ha (58 acres)
- Notification date: 1985
- Location map: Magic Map

West Wood is a 23.6 hectares (58 acres) biological Site of Special Scientific Interest in Little Sampford, north of Thaxted in northwestern Essex. It is owned and managed by the Essex Wildlife Trust.

The site is ancient woodland on chalky boulder clay and sandy loam. It was mainly elm, but this has died and the wood regenerated naturally with ash, and there is also some field maple and hornbeam. Bramble and dog's mercury dominate the ground layer, and there is a rich variety of plants in wetter areas, such as oxlip and meadow-sweet. There are many species of birds and butterflies, and four ponds which have great crested newts, dragonflies and damselflies.

There is access by a footpath from the B1051 road between Thaxted and Great Sampford.
