= The Naze Nature Reserve =

Nature reserve in Essex, England

Coordinates: 51.868°N 1.288°E

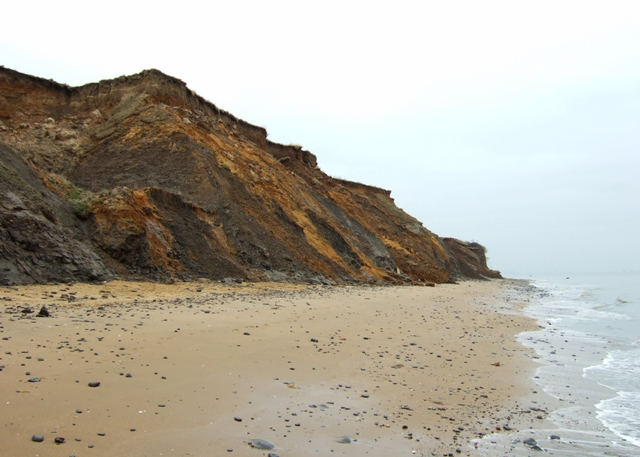
- Interactive map of The Naze Nature Reserve
- Type: Nature reserve
- Location: Walton-on-the-Naze, Essex
- OS grid: TM 264 238
- Area: 45 hectares (110 acres)
- Manager: Essex Wildlife Trust

The Naze Nature Reserve is a 45 hectare nature reserve on The Naze peninsula north of Walton-on-the-Naze in Essex. It is managed by the Essex Wildlife Trust,. Part of it, The Naze SSSI, is a geological Site of Special Scientific Interest and a Geological Conservation Review site.

This coastal site has a variety of terrestrial and marine habitats, and many migrating and nesting birds, such as dark bellied brent geese, sedge warblers, barn owls and whitethroats. The cliff is eroding at one to two metres a year.

There is access from Old Hall Lane, where the visitor centre is located.
