= Sandylay and Moat Woods =

Essex Wildlife Trust Nature reserve

Coordinates: 51.829°N 0.514°E

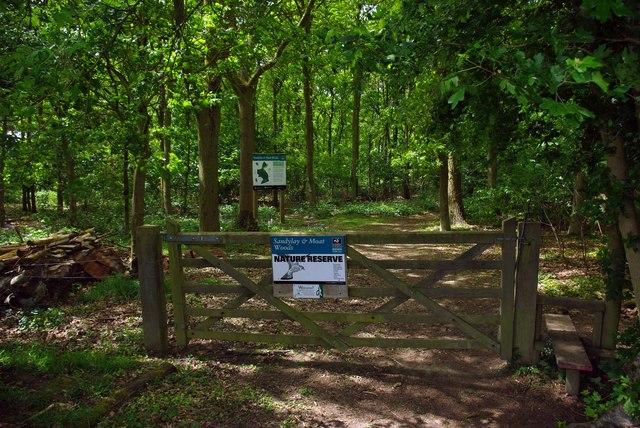
- Interactive map of Sandylay and Moat Woods
- Type: Nature reserve
- Location: Great Leighs, Essex
- OS grid: TL 733 175
- Area: 7.5 hectares (19 acres)
- Manager: Essex Wildlife Trust

Sandylay and Moat Woods is a 7.5-hectare (19-acre) nature reserve east of Great Leighs in Essex. It is owned and managed by the Essex Wildlife Trust.

These adjacent woods are mainly coppiced small-leaved lime, with a small stream and many flowering plants, including wood anemones, sweet violets, spurge laurel, stinking iris and early purple orchid.

There is access by a footpath from Mill Lane.
