= Fingringhoe =

Village in Essex, England

Coordinates: 51.844°N 0.947°E

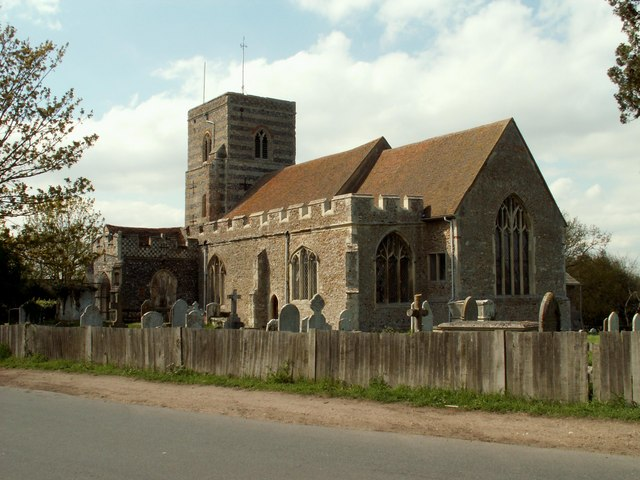
- St. Andrew's church, Fingringhoe

- Location within Essex
- Population: 764 (Parish, 2021)
- OS grid reference: TM029203
- District: City of Colchester
- Shire county: Essex
- Region: East
- Country: England
- Sovereign state: United Kingdom
- Post town: Colchester
- Postcode district: CO5
- Dialling code: 01206
- Police: Essex
- Fire: Essex
- Ambulance: East of England
- UK Parliament: Harwich and North Essex
- Website: fingringhoe.info

Fingringhoe is a village and civil parish in the City of Colchester district of Essex, England. The centre of the village is classified as a conservation area, featuring a traditional village pond and red telephone box. The Roman River flows nearby before entering the River Colne. The name means "hill-spur of the Fingringas", a tribal name denoting the "people who dwell on the finger of land". It has frequently appeared on lists of unusual place-names. At the 2021 census the parish had a population of 764.

== Geography ==
=== Fingringhoe Wick ===
Fingringhoe is locally known for its salt marshes, which provide habitats for many birds and salt-water animals. These form part of the Fingringhoe Wick Nature Reserve managed by Essex Wildlife Trust.

== History ==
=== Roman port ===
During the 1st Century AD Fingringhoe was home to a river port which serviced the nearby provincial capital of Roman Britain at Camulodunum (modern Colchester). Given the lack of a known road between Fingringhoe and Colchester, it is likely that seagoing vessels stopped in Fingringhoe, where their cargo was transferred to smaller riverboats.

=== Middle Ages ===
A manor located at Fingringhoe was donated by Henry I of England to the Norman abbey of Saint-Ouen at Rouen.

== Monuments ==
=== St Andrew's Church ===
A prominent feature in the centre of the village, the north wall of St Andrew's Church dates back to the 12th century.
