= Stanford Warren =

Essex Wildlife Trust nature reserve

Coordinates: 51.505°N 0.429°E

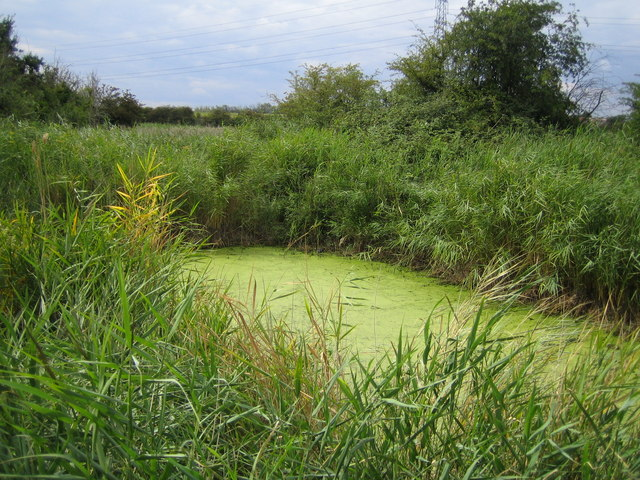
- Interactive map of Stanford Warren
- Type: Nature reserve
- Location: Stanford-le-Hope, Essex
- OS grid: TQ 687 812
- Area: 16.6 hectares (41 acres)
- Manager: Essex Wildlife Trust

Stanford Warren is a 16.6-hectare (41-acre) nature reserve south of Stanford-le-Hope in Essex. It is managed by the Essex Wildlife Trust.

This former gravel quarry is bisected by the River Hassenbrook. It has one of the largest reedbeds in the county, together with rough grassland and marshes. The bird life is diverse, including water rails, grey wagtails and bearded tits.

There is access from Mucking Wharf Road.
