= Phyllis Currie Nature Reserve =

Nature reserve in Essex, England

Coordinates: 51.836°N 0.499°E

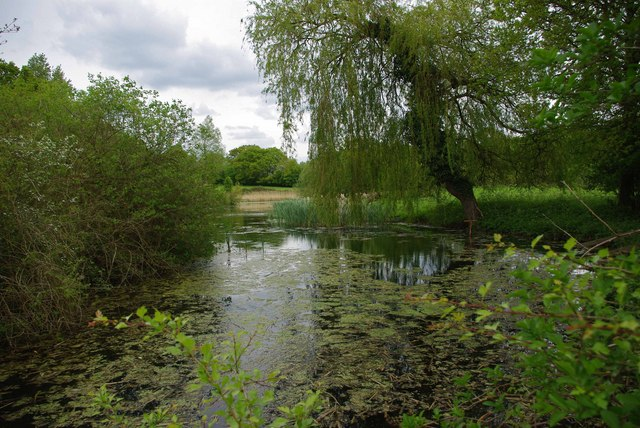
- Interactive map of Phyllis Currie Nature Reserve
- Type: Nature reserve
- Location: Great Leighs, Essex
- OS grid: TL 723 182
- Area: 8.9 hectares (22 acres)
- Manager: Essex Wildlife Trust

Phyllis Currie Nature Reserve is an 8.9-hectare (22-acre) nature reserve north-west of Great Leighs in Essex. It is owned and managed by the Essex Wildlife Trust.

This site is named after Mrs Phyllis Currie, who bequeathed it to the trust. It has diverse habitats, with grassland, a lake, woodland and ditches. Birds include kingfishers and grey herons, and 23 species of butterflies and 13 of dragonflies and damselflies have been recorded.

There is access from Dumney Lane.
