= Blue House Farm =

Nature reserve in Essex, England

Coordinates: 51.6421°N 0.681°E

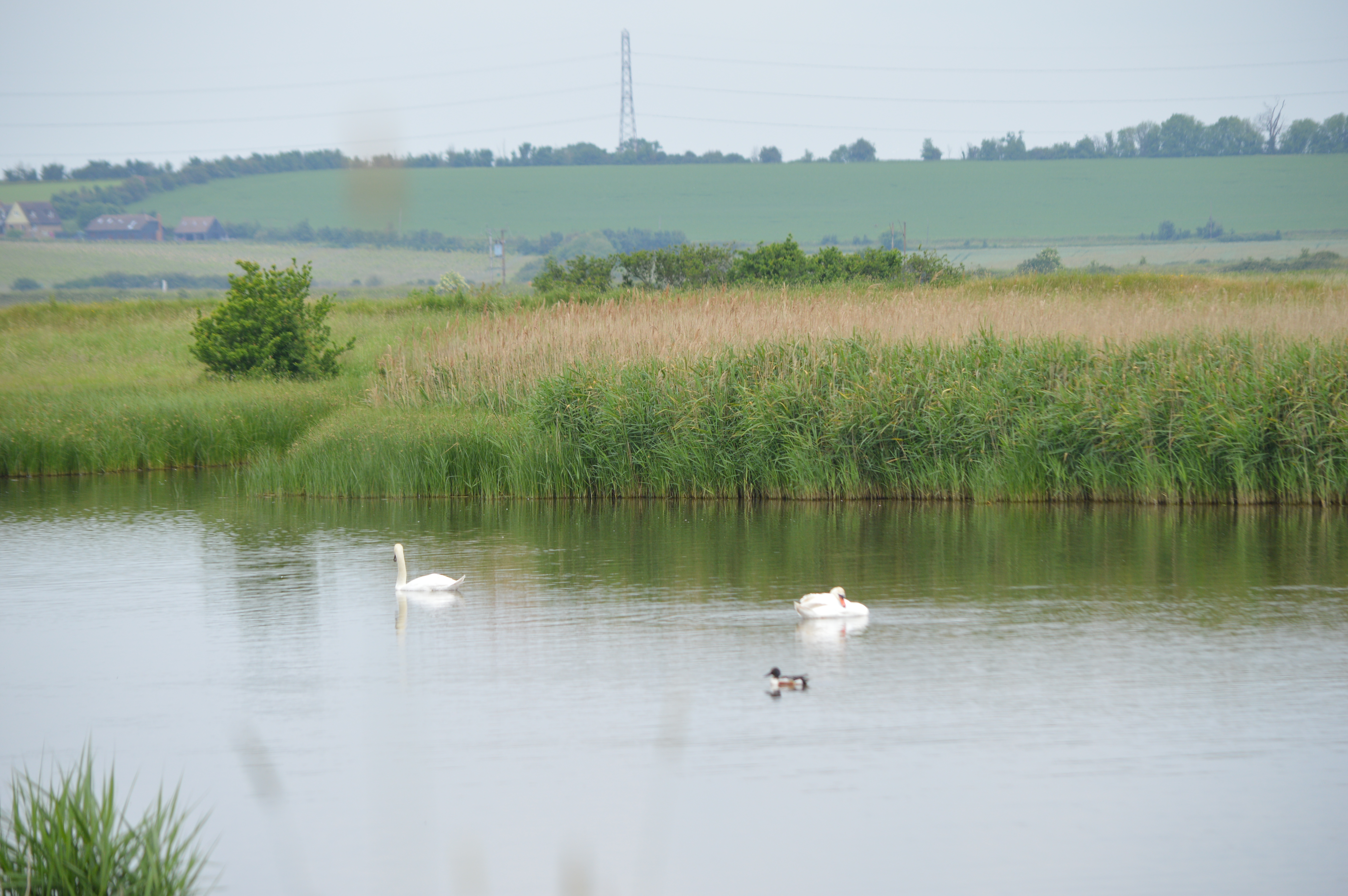
- View from a bird hide
- Interactive map of Blue House Farm
- Type: Nature reserve
- Location: North Fambridge, Essex
- OS grid: TQ856971
- Area: 242.8 hectares (600 acres)
- Manager: Essex Wildlife Trust

Blue House Farm is a 242.8-hectare (600-acre) nature reserve and farm in North Fambridge, on the north bank of the River Crouch between Burnham-on-Crouch and South Woodham Ferrers in Essex. It is managed by the Essex Wildlife Trust. Most of the site is in of the Crouch and Roach Estuaries Site of Special Scientific Interest.

This site has been grassland for the last 100 years, and it is grazed by cows and sheep. The site has ponds, creeks and ditches, and a 20 hectare field is flooded during the winter, providing feeding grounds for large numbers of wildfowl and wading birds, including around 2000 Brent geese. Other winter birds include lapwings, golden plovers and dunlins, while there are spring migrants such as green sandpipers and spotted redshanks, and breeding birds such as skylarks and meadow pipits. Mammals include water voles and hares, and many butterflies.

There is access only to a footpath through the farm, which has three bird hides along it. The footpath runs from Blue House Farm Chase to a footpath along the river bank.
