= Crowsheath Wood =

Nature reserve in Essex, England

Coordinates: 51.6407°N 0.4945°E

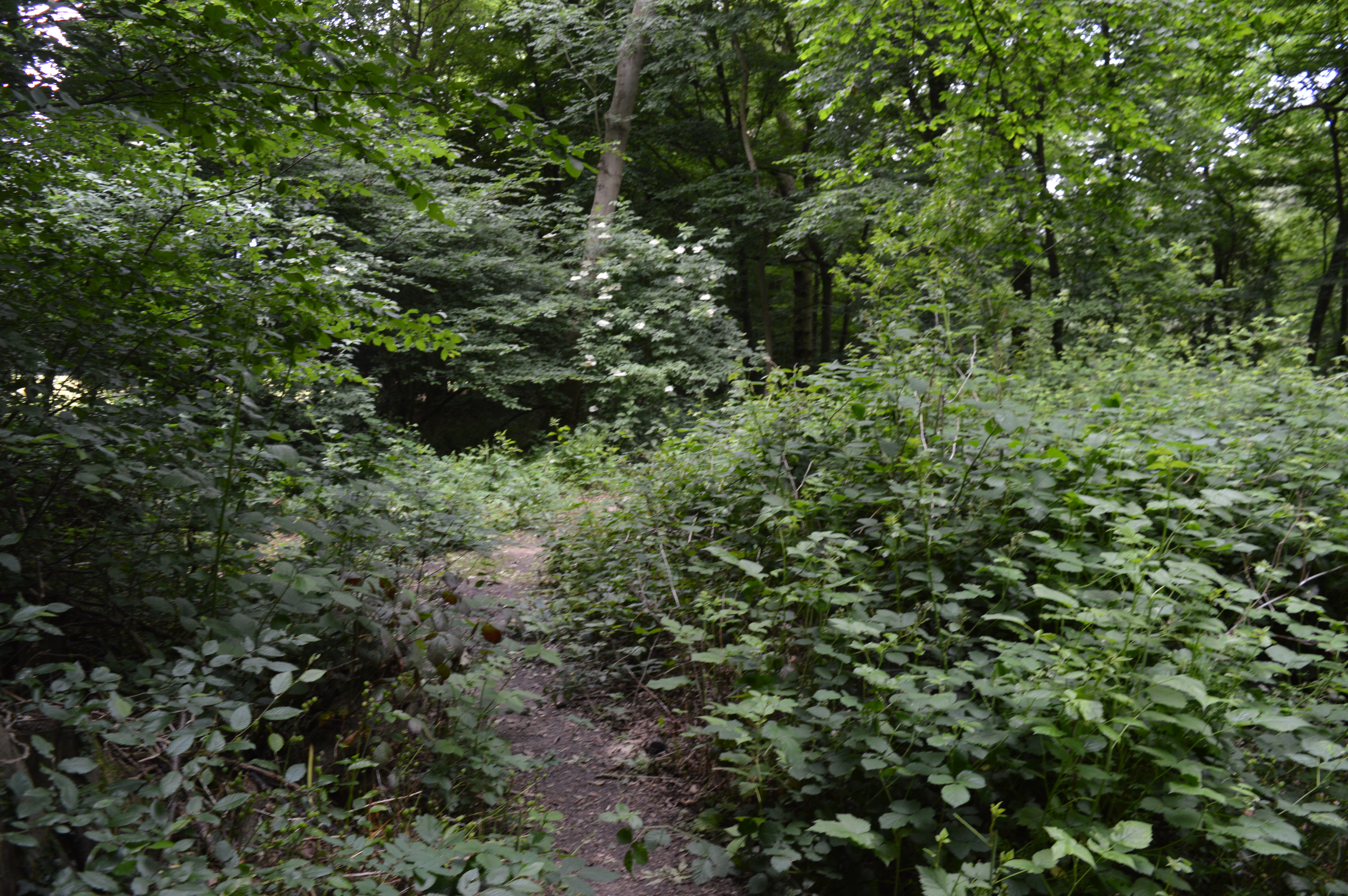
- Interactive map of Crowsheath Wood
- Type: Nature reserve
- Location: Downham, Essex
- OS grid: TQ 727 964
- Area: 8.1 hectares (20 acres)
- Manager: Essex Wildlife Trust

Crowsheath Wood (or Thrift Wood) is an 8.1-hectare (20-acre) nature reserve in Downham, between Billericay and South Woodham Ferrers in Essex. It is managed by the Essex Wildlife Trust.

The wood has many mature oak trees, with coppiced areas mainly of hornbeam, together with other trees such as ash and field maple. There are ponds in the centre of the site where lesser spearwort grows. Flowers include bluebell and wood anemone, and there are birds typical of broadleaved woodland.

There is access from Crowsheath Lane and by a footpath from School Road.
