= Thrift Wood =

Nature reserve in Essex, England

Coordinates: 51.6284°N 0.0646°E

- Site of Special Scientific Interest
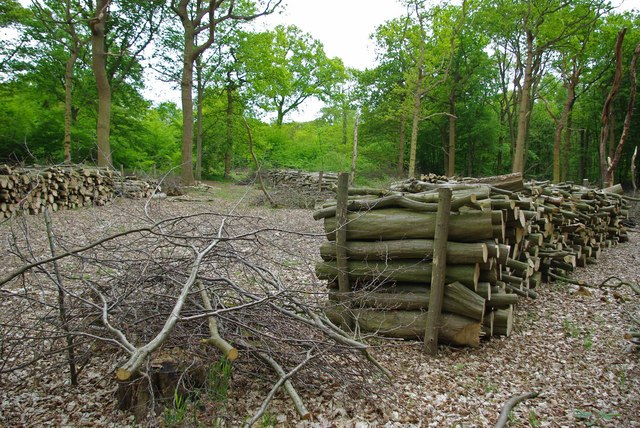
- Location of Thrift Wood.
- Area of search: Essex
- Grid reference: TL 792018
- Interest: Biological
- Area: 19.4 ha (48 acres)
- Notification date: 1987
- Location map: Magic Map

Thrift Wood is a 19.4-hectare (48-acre) biological Site of Special Scientific Interest south-east of Bicknacre in Essex. It is managed by the Essex Wildlife Trust.

The site is an ancient semi-natural wood on acid soil. It is of two types, both unusual habitats, pedunculate oak/hornbeam and sessile oak/hornbeam. Wild service trees and elders are found in the shrub layer, and a pond has a raised sphagnum bog. Twenty species of butterfly have been recorded.

There is access from Main Road.
