= Fingringhoe Wick =

Nature reserve in Fingringhoe, England

Coordinates: 51.835°N 0.971°E

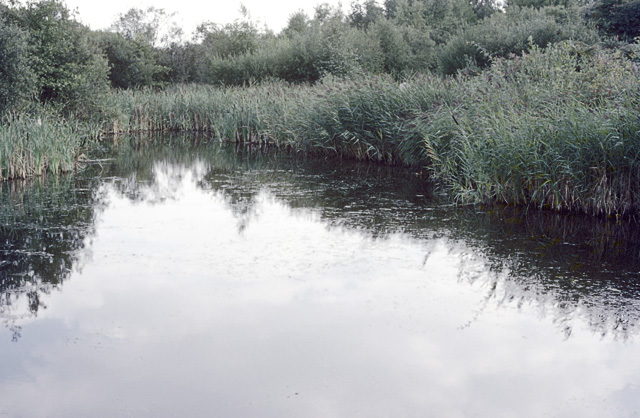
- Interactive map of Fingringhoe Wick
- Type: Nature reserve
- Location: Fingringhoe, Essex
- OS grid: TM 048 193
- Area: 48.6 hectares (120 acres)
- Manager: Essex Wildlife Trust

Fingringhoe Wick is a 48.6-hectare (120-acre) nature reserve in Fingringhoe in Essex. It is managed by the Essex Wildlife Trust, which runs a visitor centre on the site. It is part of the Colne Estuary Site of Special Scientific Interest, Ramsar site and Nature Conservation Review site.

These former gravel quarries were the Trust's first reserve, established in 1961. Habitats are the Colne Estuary, gorse heathland, grassland, reedbeds and ponds. There are nearly 200 species of birds and 350 of flowering plants, together with many dragonflies, damselflies and butterflies. The reserve is famous for its 35-plus singing males of Common Nightingale in the spring.

The site can be accessed by a 30 to 45 minute walk along the Gravel Pit Trail from Fingringhoe village.
