= Weeleyhall Wood =

Woodland in Essex, England

Coordinates: 51.845°N 1.132°E

- Site of Special Scientific Interest
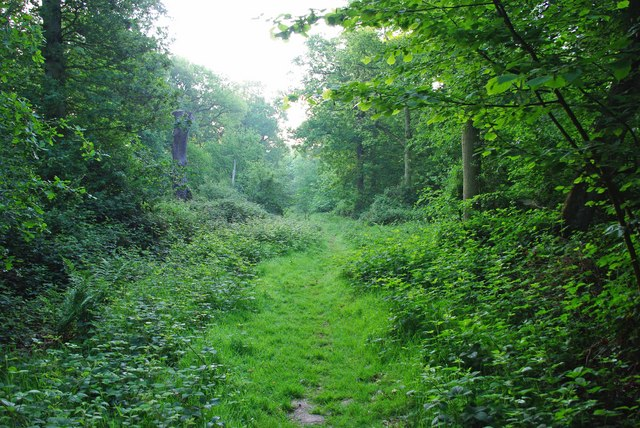
- Location of Weeleyhall Wood.
- Area of search: Essex
- Grid reference: TM 159210
- Interest: Biological
- Area: 31.0 ha (77 acres)
- Notification date: 1985
- Location map: Magic Map

Weeleyhall Wood is a 31 hectare biological Site of Special Scientific Interest north of Clacton-on-Sea in Essex. It is managed by the Essex Wildlife Trust.

It has a variety of woodland types, reflecting diverse soils. It is mainly pedunculate oak over a layer of coppice hazel and sweet chestnut planted in the nineteenth century. It has the largest Essex population of climbing corydalis, and four species of fern. There are two ponds and species-rich damp, grassy rides.

There is access by a track from the B1441 road.
