= Belcher's and Broadfield Woods =

Nature reserve in Essex, England

Coordinates: 51.909°N 0.629°E

- Site of Special Scientific Interest
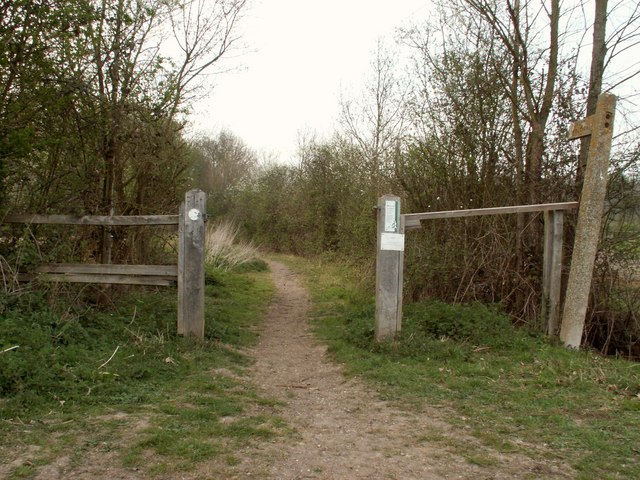
- Location of Belcher's and Broadfield Woods.
- Area of search: Essex
- Grid reference: TL 810267
- Interest: Biological
- Area: 14.4 ha (36 acres)
- Notification date: 1986
- Location map: Magic Map

Belcher's and Broadfield Woods is a 14.4-hectare (36-acre) biological Site of Special Scientific Interest between Halstead and Braintree in Essex. It is managed by the Essex Wildlife Trust as the Brookes Nature Reserve.

The site is coppice woodland on chalky boulder clay. There is a variety of woodlands types, such as wet ash and maple, pedunculate oak and hornbeam, and acid birch, ash and lime. The ground flora includes species which are locally uncommon, including greater butterfly-orchid and bird's-nest orchid. There is also a variety of butterflies, and ponds which have frogs and newts.

The site is crossed by footpaths.
