= Shut Heath Wood =

Nature reserve in Essex, England

Coordinates: 51.788°N 0.685°E

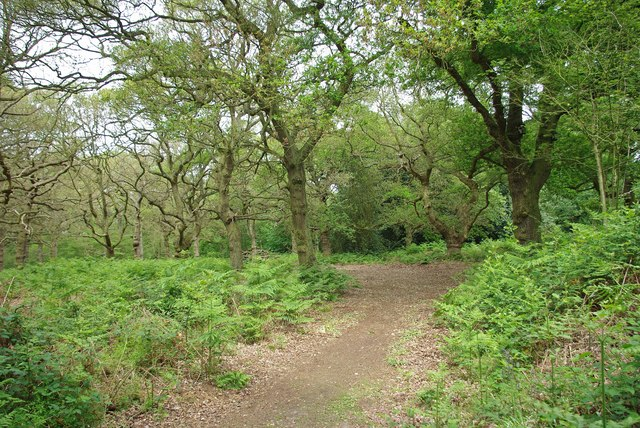
- Interactive map of Shut Heath Wood
- Type: Nature reserve
- Location: Great Totham, Essex
- OS grid: TL 853 133
- Area: 20.2 hectares (50 acres)
- Manager: Essex Wildlife Trust

Shut Heath Wood is a 20.2-hectare (50-acre) nature reserve Essex. It is managed by the Essex Wildlife Trust.

Over half this site is managed as farmland, and the rest is ancient oak woodland also has coppiced sweet chestnut and hornbeam, with an understorey of ash, elder and hazel. Invertebrates include damselflies, dragonflies, glow-worms and wood ants. Common blooms found on the reserve in the summer include bluebells, bugles, cuckoo flowers, wood anemones, primroses, dog violets, and wood sorrels.

There is access by a footpath from Tiptree Road.
