= John Weston Nature Reserve =

Nature reserve in Essex, England

Coordinates: 51.873°N 1.290°E

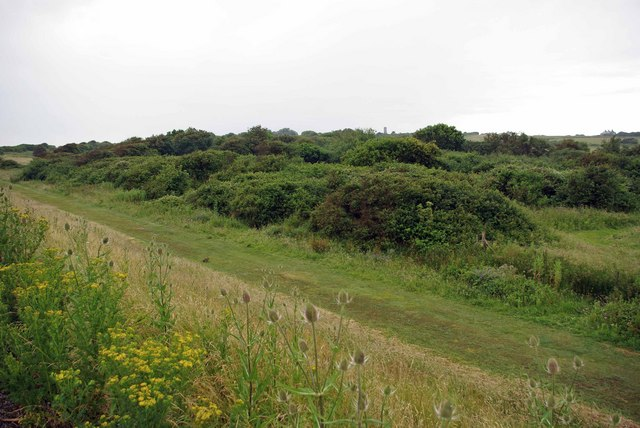
- Interactive map of John Weston Nature Reserve
- Type: Nature reserve
- Location: Walton-on-the-Naze, Essex
- OS grid: TM 266 245
- Area: 3.6 hectares (8.9 acres)
- Manager: Essex Wildlife Trust

John Weston Nature Reserve is a 3.6-hectare (8.9-acre) nature reserve north of Walton-on-the-Naze in Essex. It is managed by the Essex Wildlife Trust.

This site is named after its former warden, who died in 1984. It has rough grassland, blackthorn and bramble scrub and four ponds. Nesting birds include the lesser and common whitethroat, and there are flora such as slender thistle, pepper saxifrage and fenugreek.

There is access from Naze Park Road.
