= Hales and Shadwell Woods =

Nature reserve in Essex, England

Coordinates: 52.039°N 0.289°E

- Site of Special Scientific Interest
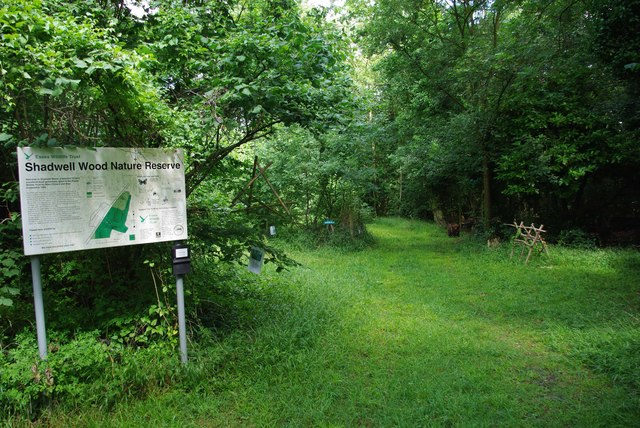
- Shadwell Wood
- Location of Hales and Shadwell Woods.
- Area of search: Essex
- Grid reference: TL 573414; TL 572404
- Interest: Biological
- Area: 15.4 ha (38 acres)
- Notification date: 1986
- Location map: Magic Map

Hales and Shadwell Woods is a 15.4-hectare (38-acre) biological Site of Special Scientific Interest north-east of Saffron Walden in Essex. Shadwell Wood has an area of 7.1 hectares and it is managed by the Essex Wildlife Trust. Hales Wood is a National Nature Reserve, and it is listed in the Nature Conservation Review.

The woods, which are under half a mile apart, are both ancient coppice wet ash and maple on chalky boulder clay. The shrub layer is diverse, with plants including wayfaring-trees, guelder roses, spurge-laurel and the nationally uncommon oxlip. Seven species of orchid have been recorded in Shadwell Wood, which also has herb-rich grassy rides.

There is access to Shadwell Wood by a footpath from Walden Road, but no access to Hales Wood.
