= Maldon Wick =

Nature reserve in Maldon, Essex, England

Coordinates: 51.72°N 0.665°E

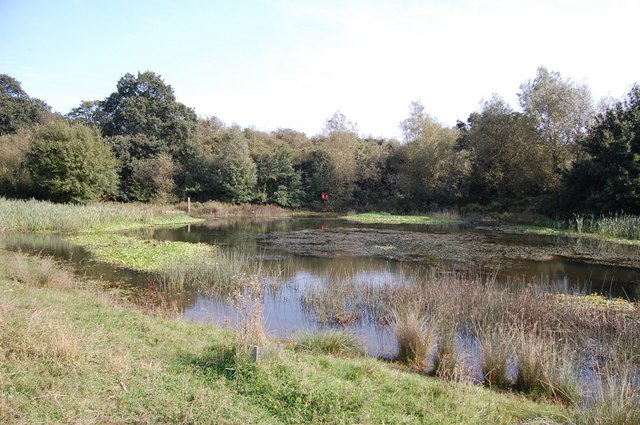
- Interactive map of Maldon Wick
- Type: Nature reserve
- Location: Maldon, Essex
- OS grid: TL 842 057
- Area: 6.1 hectares (15 acres)
- Manager: Essex Wildlife Trust

Maldon Wick is a 6.1-hectare (15-acre) nature reserve in Maldon in Essex. It is managed by the Essex Wildlife Trust.

This is a 2.4 kilometres (1.5 miles) linear site along the route of the former railway line between Maldon and Woodham Ferrers, and it is mainly on embankment. There are many breeding birds, and 28 species of butterflies and 17 of dragonfly have been recorded. Flowering plants include moschatels and sweet violets.

There is access from Limebrook Way.
