= Great Holland Pits =

Nature reserve in Essex, England

Coordinates: 51.826°N 1.197°E

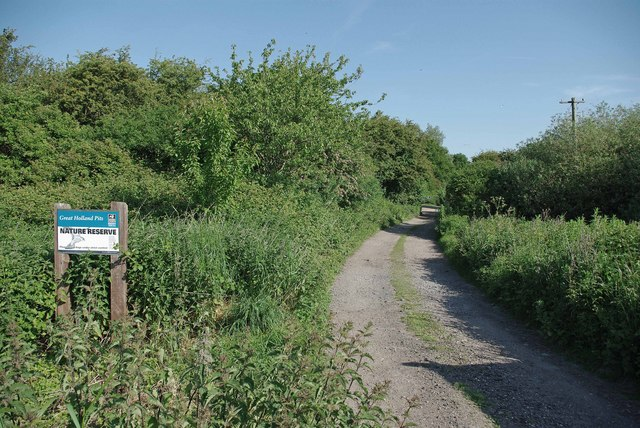
- Interactive map of Great Holland Pits
- Type: Nature reserve
- Location: Great Holland, Essex
- OS grid: TM 204 190
- Area: 16.2 hectares (40 acres)
- Manager: Essex Wildlife Trust

Great Holland Pits is a 16.2-hectare (40-acre) nature reserve east of Great Holland in Essex. It is managed by the Essex Wildlife Trust.

This area of former gravel pits has grassland, ancient woodland, ponds and wet depressions. There are water birds such as kingfishers, coots and little grebes, and flowering plants include moschatels and carline thistles.

There is access by a footpath from Little Clacton Road.
