= Oxley Meadow =

Nature reserve in Essex, England

Coordinates: 51.8007°N 0.77894°E

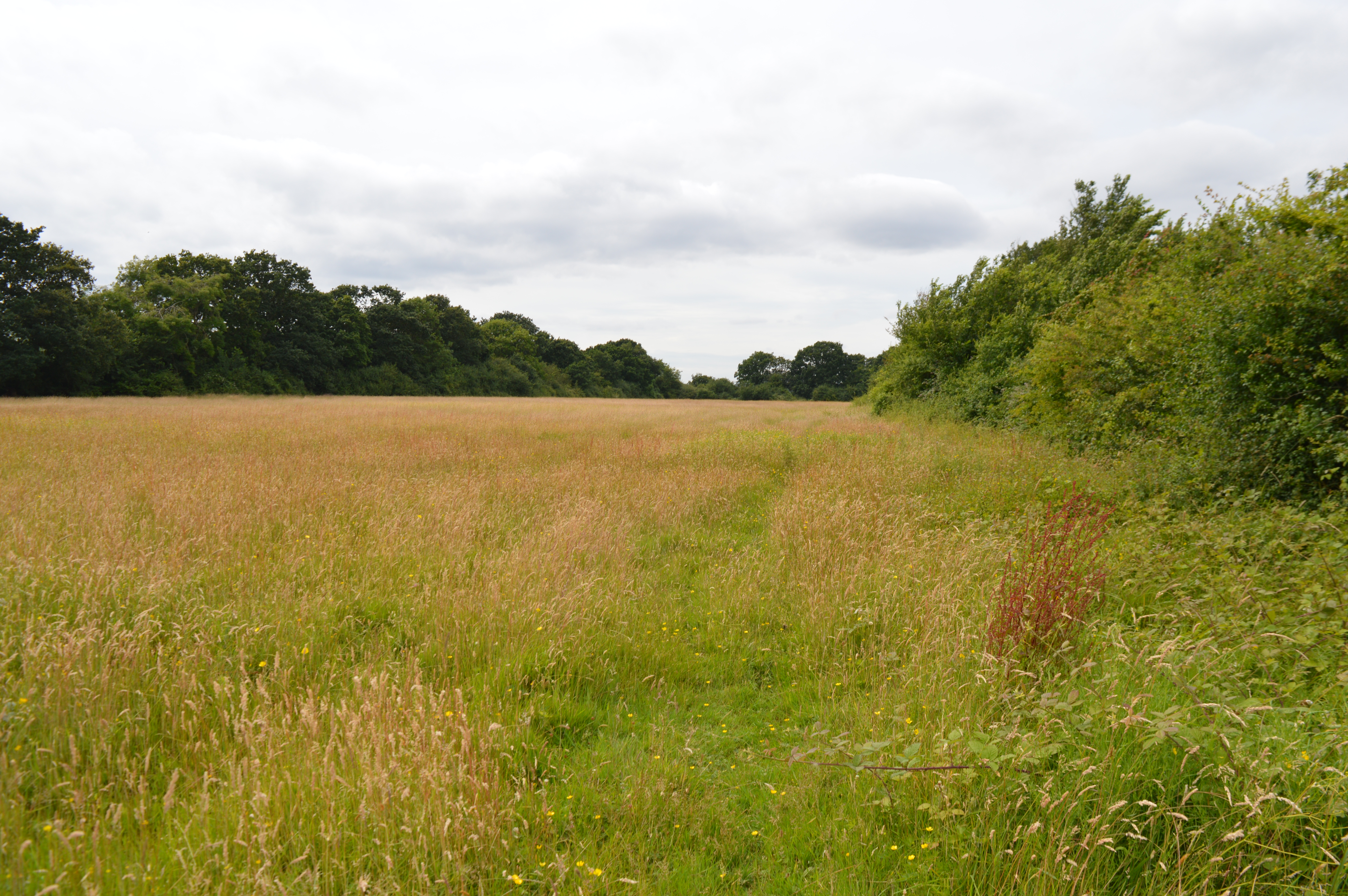
- Interactive map of Oxley Meadow
- Type: Nature reserve
- Location: Tolleshunt Knights, Essex
- OS grid: TL 917 149
- Area: 3.2 hectares (7.9 acres)
- Manager: Essex Wildlife Trust

Oxley Meadow is a 3.2-hectare (7.9-acre) nature reserve in Tolleshunt Knights, near Tiptree in Essex. It is managed by the Essex Wildlife Trust.

The site has two meadows which are rich in flowers, including many green winged orchids and adderstongue ferns. There is also a variety of common butterfly species, and hedgerows provide nesting sites for birds such as the lesser whitethroat.

There is access from Park Lane.
