= Little Waltham Meadows =

Nature reserve in Essex, England

Coordinates: 51.779°N 0.482°E

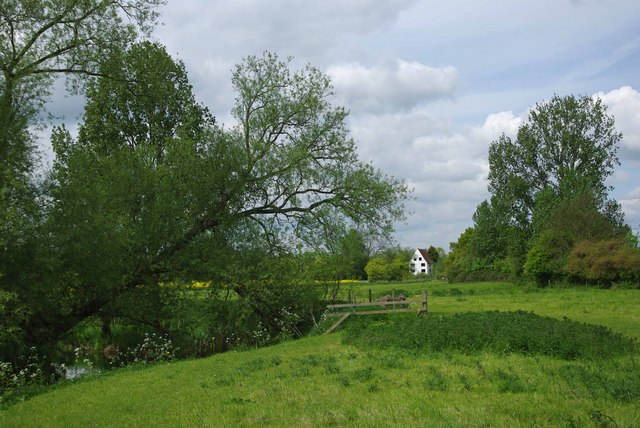
- Interactive map of Little Waltham Meadows
- Type: Nature reserve
- Location: Little Waltham, Essex
- OS grid: TL 713 119
- Area: 8.9 hectares (22 acres)
- Manager: Essex Wildlife Trust

Little Waltham Meadows is an 8.9-hectare (22-acre) nature reserve south of Little Waltham in Essex. It is owned and managed by the Essex Wildlife Trust.

The site is wet and dry meadows on the bank of the River Chelmer, which are grazed to restore them to their previous state. There are grassland plants such as saxifrage, bee orchids and yellow oat-grass. Tawny owls and sparrowhawks hunt in the meadows and ancient hedgerows.

There is access from Back Lane.
