= Westhouse Wood =

Nature reserve in Essex, England

Coordinates: 51.908°N 0.869°E

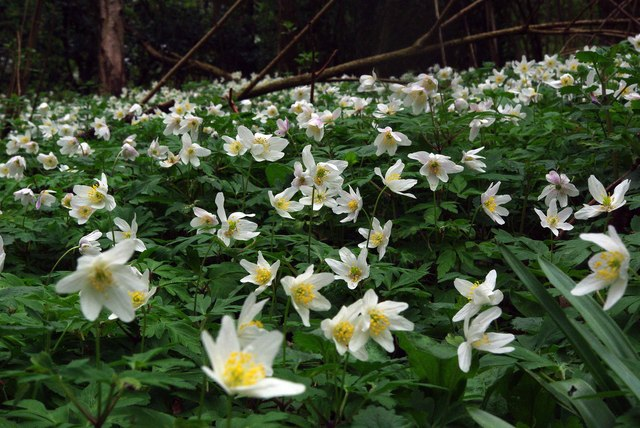
- Interactive map of Westhouse Wood
- Type: Nature reserve
- Location: Colchester, Essex
- OS grid: TL 974 271
- Area: 2.8 hectares (6.9 acres)
- Manager: Essex Wildlife Trust

Westhouse Wood is a 2.8-hectare (6.9-acre) nature reserve north-west of Colchester in Essex. It is managed by the Essex Wildlife Trust.

The wood is mainly coppiced hazel, and other tree include small-leaved lime, crab apple, oak, ash, sweet chestnut, field maple and rowan. There are flowering plants such as wood anemones and foxgloves.

There is access from a slip road off the B1508 road.
