= Lexden Gathering Grounds =

Nature reserve in Colchester, England

Coordinates: 51.8929°N 0.85555°E

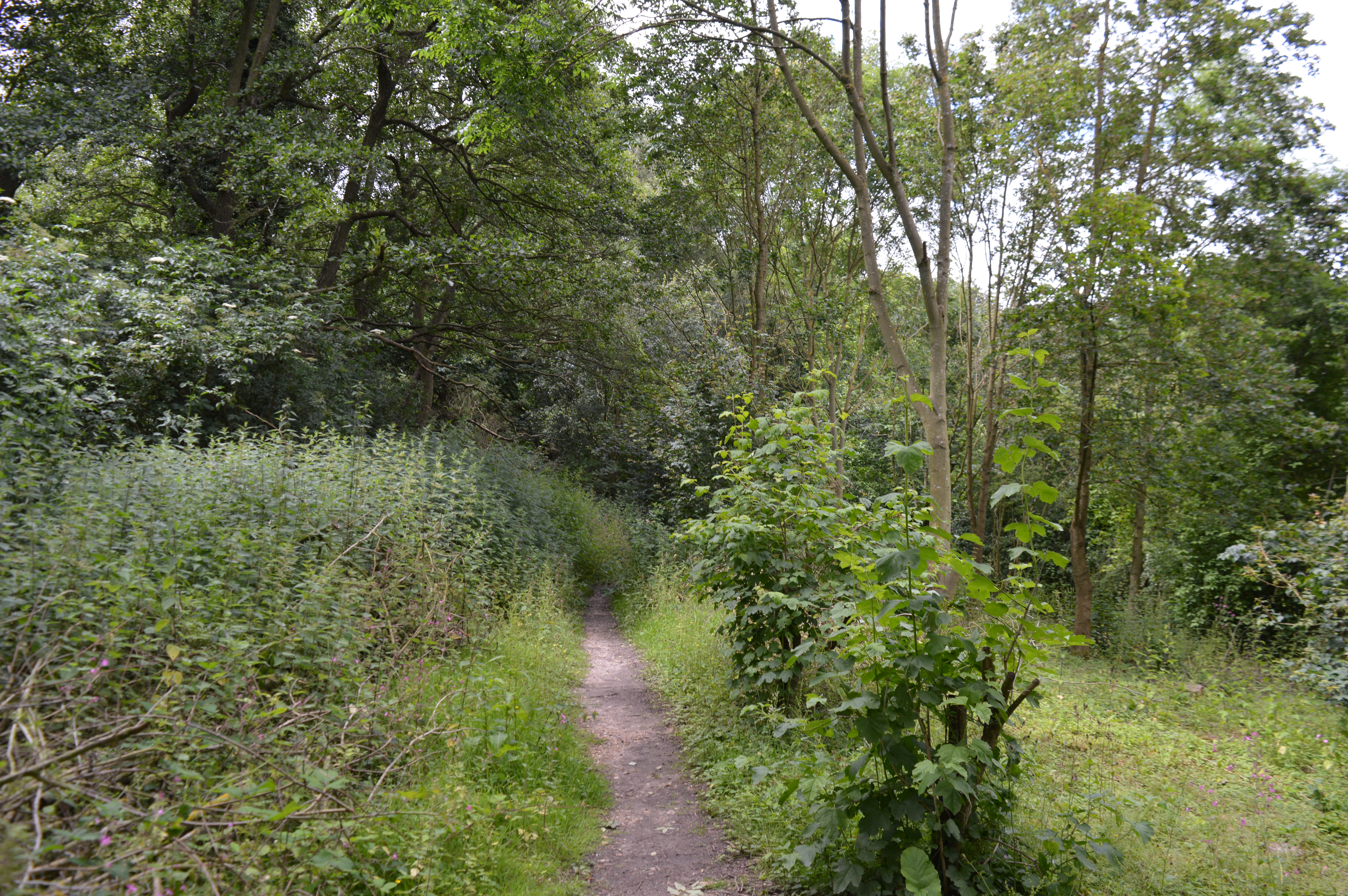
- Interactive map of Lexden Gathering Grounds
- Type: Nature reserve
- Location: Lexden, Colchester, Essex
- OS grid: TL 965 254
- Area: 8.9 hectares (22 acres)
- Manager: Essex Wildlife Trust

Lexden Gathering Grounds is an 8.9-hectare (22-acre) nature reserve in Lexden, a suburb of Colchester in Essex. It is owned by Anglian Water and managed by the Essex Wildlife Trust.

The site was formerly a "gathering ground" for water from springs and was used as a water source until the 1970s. It is mainly woodland with some marsh, meadow and open rides. One area has semi-natural birch and ash woods, and the marsh has moschatel and mature hazel and alder coppice. There are badgers and foxes, and butterflies including common browns and small coppers.

There is access from Cooks Lane, off Cymbeline Way.
