= Thorndon Park =

Protected area in Essex, England

Coordinates: 51.605°N 0.315°E

- Site of Special Scientific Interest
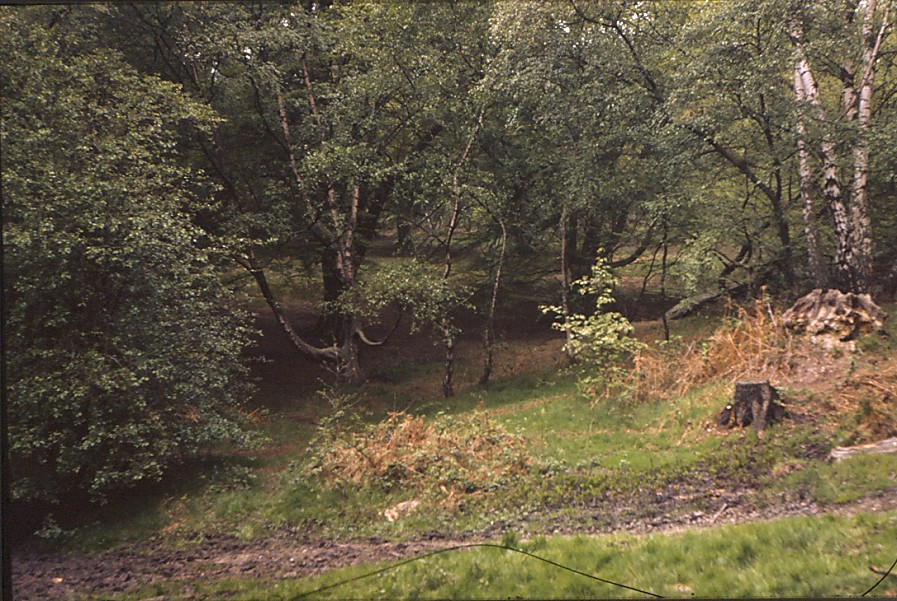
- Location of Thorndon Park.
- Area of search: Essex
- Grid reference: TQ 604917; TQ 614911; TQ 625903
- Interest: Biological
- Area: 141.4 ha (349 acres)
- Notification date: 1986
- Location map: Magic Map

Thorndon Park is a 141.4-hectare (349-acre) biological Site of Special Scientific Interest in Brentwood in Essex. Part of it is run by Essex County Council as Thorndon Country Park, and the Essex Wildlife Trust manages its visitor centre.

The site is semi-natural woodland and ancient parkland. It has a diverse population of beetles, including one which is rare and threatened in Britain. The most common trees are sessile and pedunculate oak, silver birch and hornbeam. The parkland has old oak pollards on acid or neutral grassland.

The country park is divided into Thorndon Park North, with access from The Avenue, and Thorndon Park South, with access from the A128 road.
