= Cockaynes Wood =

Nature reserve in Essex, England

Coordinates: 51.856°N 0.981°E

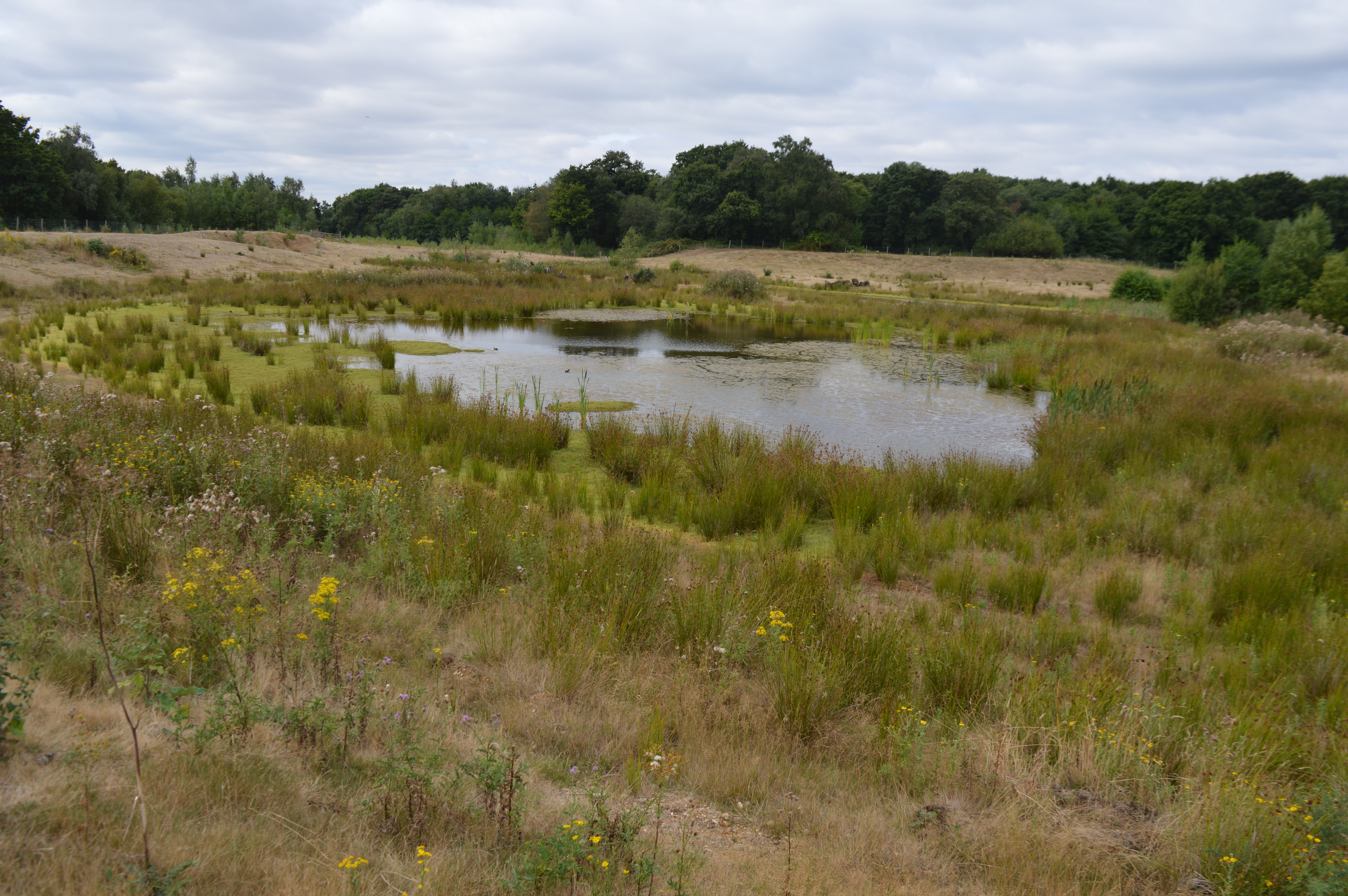
- Interactive map of Cockaynes Wood
- Type: Nature reserve
- Location: Wivenhoe, Essex
- OS grid: TM051 215
- Area: 20.2 hectares (50 acres)
- Manager: Essex Wildlife Trust

Cockaynes Wood is a 20.2-hectare (50-acre) nature reserve between Wivenhoe and Alresford in Essex, United Kingdom. It is managed by the Essex Wildlife Trust and the Cockaynes Wood Trust.

Cockaynes Wood is ancient, and was listed in the Domesday Book. The nature reserve also includes Villa Wood and more open areas, with heathland, meadows, and water-filled former quarries. Wildlife includes a rare weevil and birds including barn owls.

A footpath from Ballast Quay in Wivenhoe to Cockaynes Lane in Alresford goes through the site. The areas around the water-filled quarries are closed to the public.
