= Iron Latch =

Nature reserve in Essex, England

Coordinates: 51.8975°N 0.83279°E

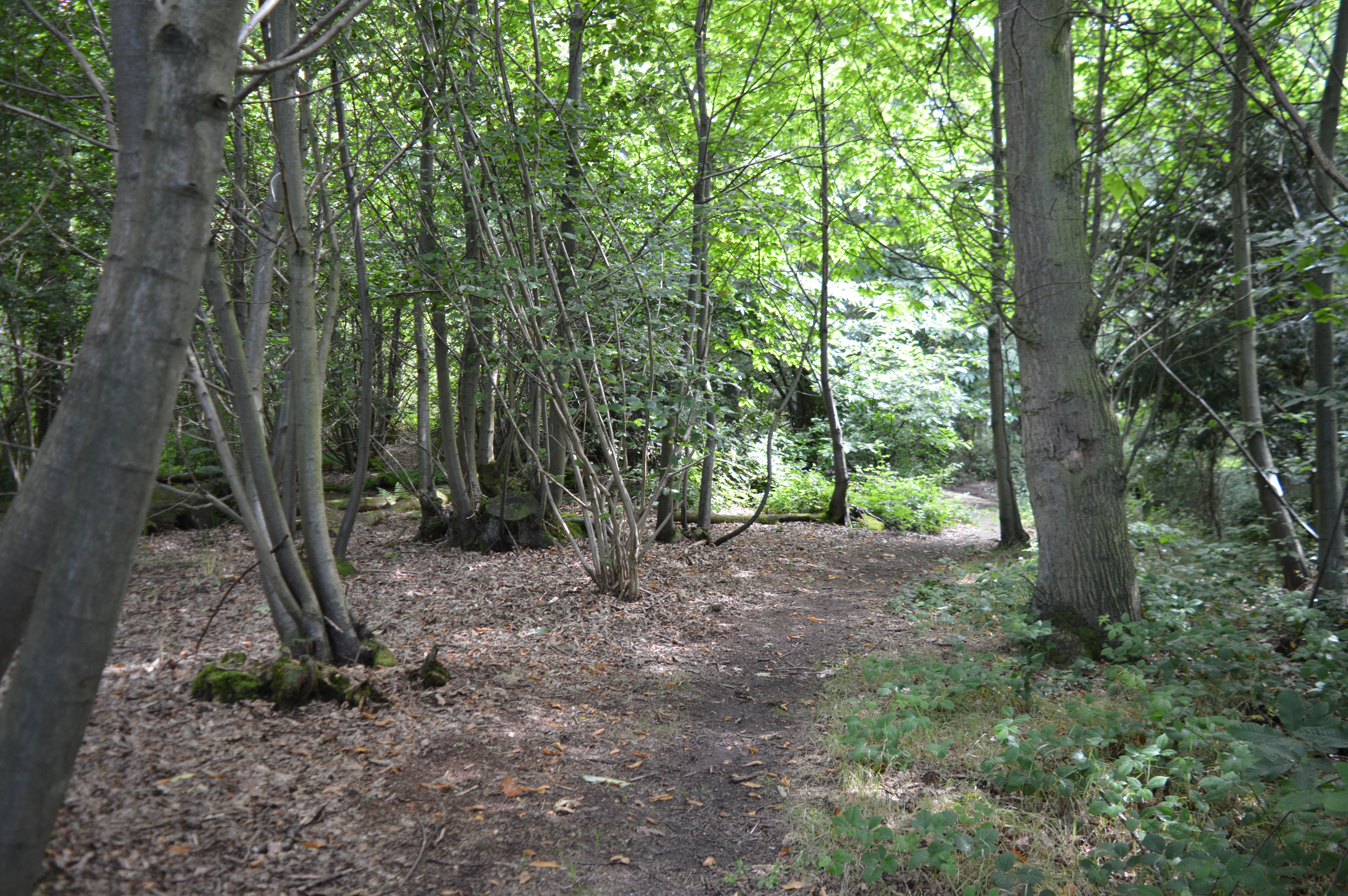
- Interactive map of Iron Latch
- Type: Nature reserve
- Location: Eight Ash Green, Essex
- OS grid: TL 950 259
- Area: 4.3 hectares (11 acres)
- Manager: Essex Wildlife Trust

Iron Latch is a 4.3-hectare (11-acre) nature reserve in Eight Ash Green, west of Colchester in Essex.

The site consists of areas of species-rich grassland and ash woodland. Bird's foot trefoil provides food for common blue butterflies, and other butterflies include purple hairstreaks. Nightingales nest in the trees and hedges.

There is access from Iron Latch Lane.
