= Stour Estuary =

Estuary in England

Coordinates: 51.954°N 1.174°E

- Site of Special Scientific Interest
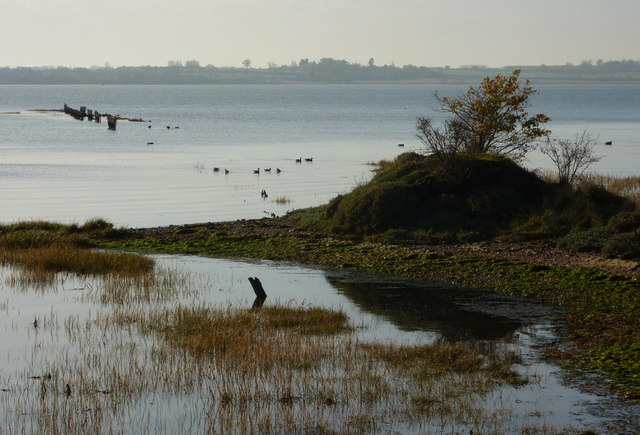
- Location of Stour Estuary.
- Area of search: Essex; Suffolk
- Grid reference: TM 180330
- Interest: Biological; Geological
- Area: 2,523 ha (6,230 acres)
- Notification date: 2003
- Location map: Magic Map

Designations

Ramsar Wetland
- Official name: Stour & Orwell Estuaries
- Designated: 13 July 1994
- Reference no.: 662

Stour Estuary is a 2,523 hectare biological and geological Site of Special Scientific Interest which stretches from Manningtree to Harwich in Essex and Suffolk. It is also an internationally important wetland Ramsar site, a Special Protection Area and a Nature Conservation Review site. It is part of the Suffolk Coast and Heaths Area of Outstanding Natural Beauty, and there are Geological Conservation Review sites in Wrabness, Stutton, and Harwich Part of the site is managed by the Royal Society for the Protection of Birds, and a small area is Wrabness Nature Reserve, a Local Nature Reserve managed by the Essex Wildlife Trust.

The estuary is nationally important for thirteen species of wintering wildfowl and three on autumn passage, for coastal saltmarsh, sheltered muddy shores, two scarce marine invertebrates, scarce plants and three geological sites. Birds include redshank, black-tailed godwit and dunlin, and there are nationally important sponges, ascidians and red algae. Harwich has thirty ash layers dating to the Eocene Harwich Formation and the succeeding London Clay. Wrabness has the most complete succession of ashes showing the importance of volcanism in southern England in the early Eocene. Stutton has fossils dating to the mid-Pleistocene, including extinct mammals such as straight-tusked elephants, mammoths and giant deer.
