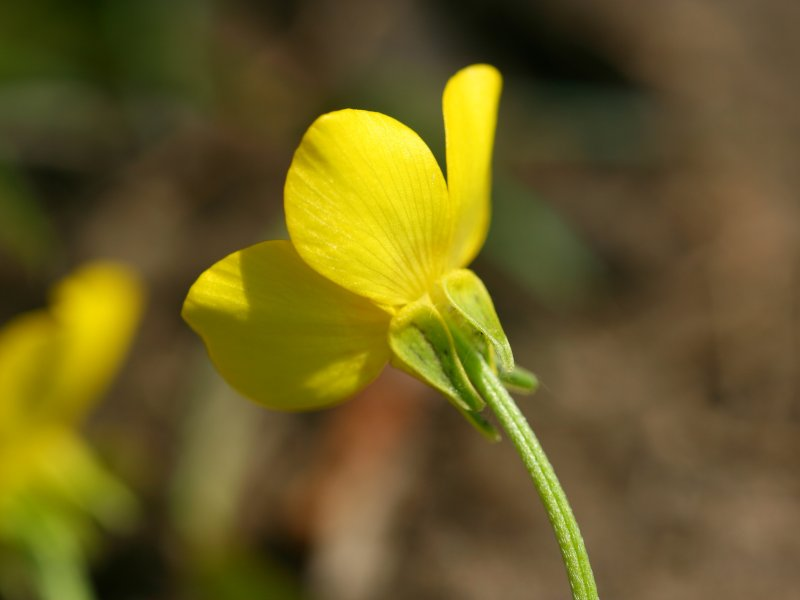

Scientific classification
- Kingdom: Plantae
- Clade: Tracheophytes
- Clade: Angiosperms
- Clade: Eudicots
- Order: Ranunculales
- Family: Ranunculaceae
- Genus: Ranunculus
- Species: R. sardous

Binomial name
- Ranunculus sardous Crantz

Synonyms
- Ranunculus parvulus

= Ranunculus sardous =

Species of buttercup

Ranunculus sardous is a species of buttercup known by the common name hairy buttercup. It is native to Europe and it can be found in many other areas of the world, including parts of the United States and Australia, as an introduced species and a roadside and lawn weed. It grows in many types of disturbed habitat, especially in moist areas. It is an annual or biennial herb producing a mostly erect, hairy stem up to half a meter tall. The hairy leaves are usually divided into three leaflets which are borne on petioles a few centimeters in length. The flower has usually five yellow petals each up to a centimeter long and five reflexed sepals. The fruit is an achene borne in a spherical cluster of up to 35.

== Sardonic ==
The term sardonic (sardanios), "bitter or scornful laughter", is often cited as deriving from the name of the Sardinian plant Ranunculus sardous, known as either σαρδάνη (sardanē) or σαρδόνιον (sardonion). When eaten, it would cause the eater's face to contort in a look resembling scorn (generally followed by death). It might also be related to σαίρω (sairō) "I grin".

== See also ==
- Sardonic
