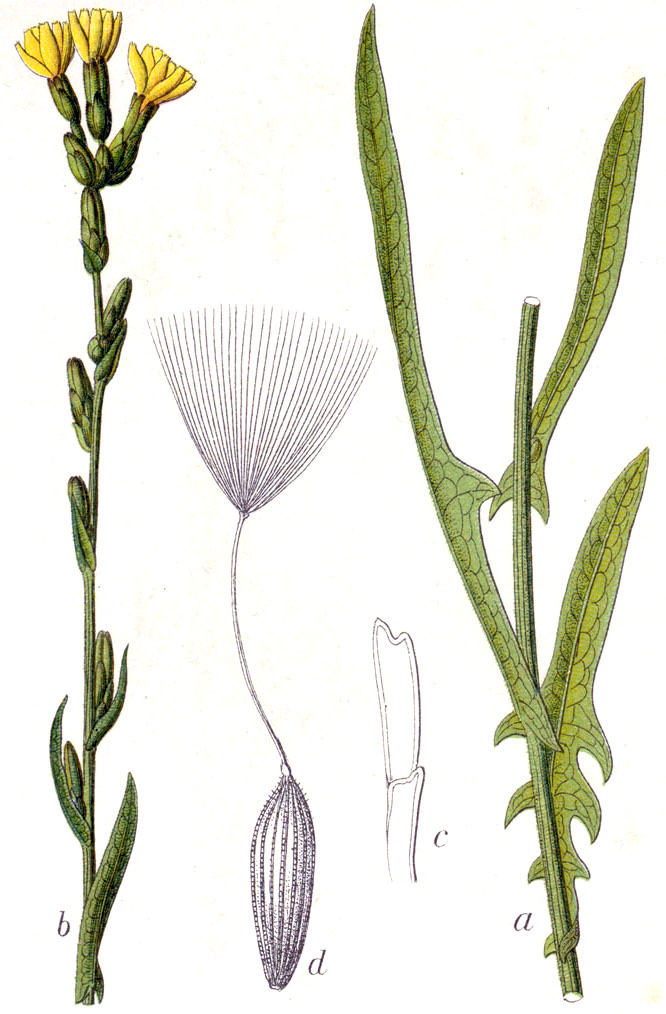

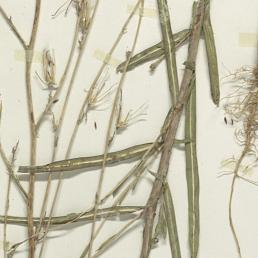
- Lactuca saligna by Jacob Sturm, 1796 Photo of Lactuca Saligna L. in the Smithsonian Institution, collected in 1912 in Dearborn County, Indiana, U.S.A.

Scientific classification
- Kingdom: Plantae
- Clade: Tracheophytes
- Clade: Angiosperms
- Clade: Eudicots
- Clade: Asterids
- Order: Asterales
- Family: Asteraceae
- Genus: Lactuca
- Species: L. saligna

Binomial name
- Lactuca saligna L. 1753

= Lactuca saligna =

Species of lettuce

Lactuca saligna is a species of wild lettuce known by the common name willowleaf lettuce, and least lettuce. It is native to Eurasia but it grows in many other places as an introduced species, including much of North America.

It can be found rarely in south-east England on dry banks near the sea and estuaries.

== Description ==
Lactuca saligna is an annual herb growing from a taproot to heights of 0.5–1 m (1 1/2–3 1/2 ft), and occasionally taller. It is much slenderer than great lettuce Lactuca virosa and prickly lettuce Lactuca serriola. The spindly, mainly erect stem has bristles on its lower portion. The leaves are very long and narrow, up to 15 cm (6 in) long but rarely than 1 cm (1/2 in) wide, usually with no lobes and no teeth. The top part of the stem is occupied by a narrow inflorescence. The branches may be pressed against the main stem, or they may branch outward. The flower head is up to about 4 cm (1 1/2 in) wide when open, with rectangular pale yellow ray florets with toothed tips. There are no disc florets. The fruit is a spiny-ribbed dark brown achene (or cypsela) almost 1 cm (1/2 in) long with a long white pappus.

Lactuca saligna flowers from July to August in Britain.
