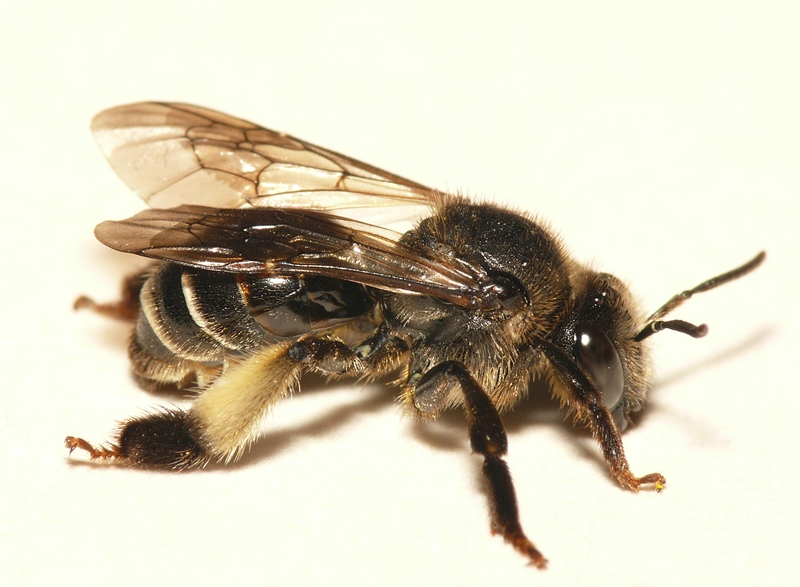

Scientific classification
- Kingdom: Animalia
- Phylum: Arthropoda
- Clade: Pancrustacea
- Class: Insecta
- Order: Hymenoptera
- Family: Melittidae
- Genus: Macropis
- Species: M. europaea

Binomial name
- Macropis europaea Warncke, 1973

= Macropis europaea =

Species of bee

Macropis europaea is a species of insect belonging to the family Melittidae.

It is native to Europe. Macropis europaea has a mutualistic relationship with the yellow loosestrife. It uses its floral oil to line the nest and keep it waterproof since the yellow loosestrife is found in wetlands.

This bee is on the wing between July and September.
