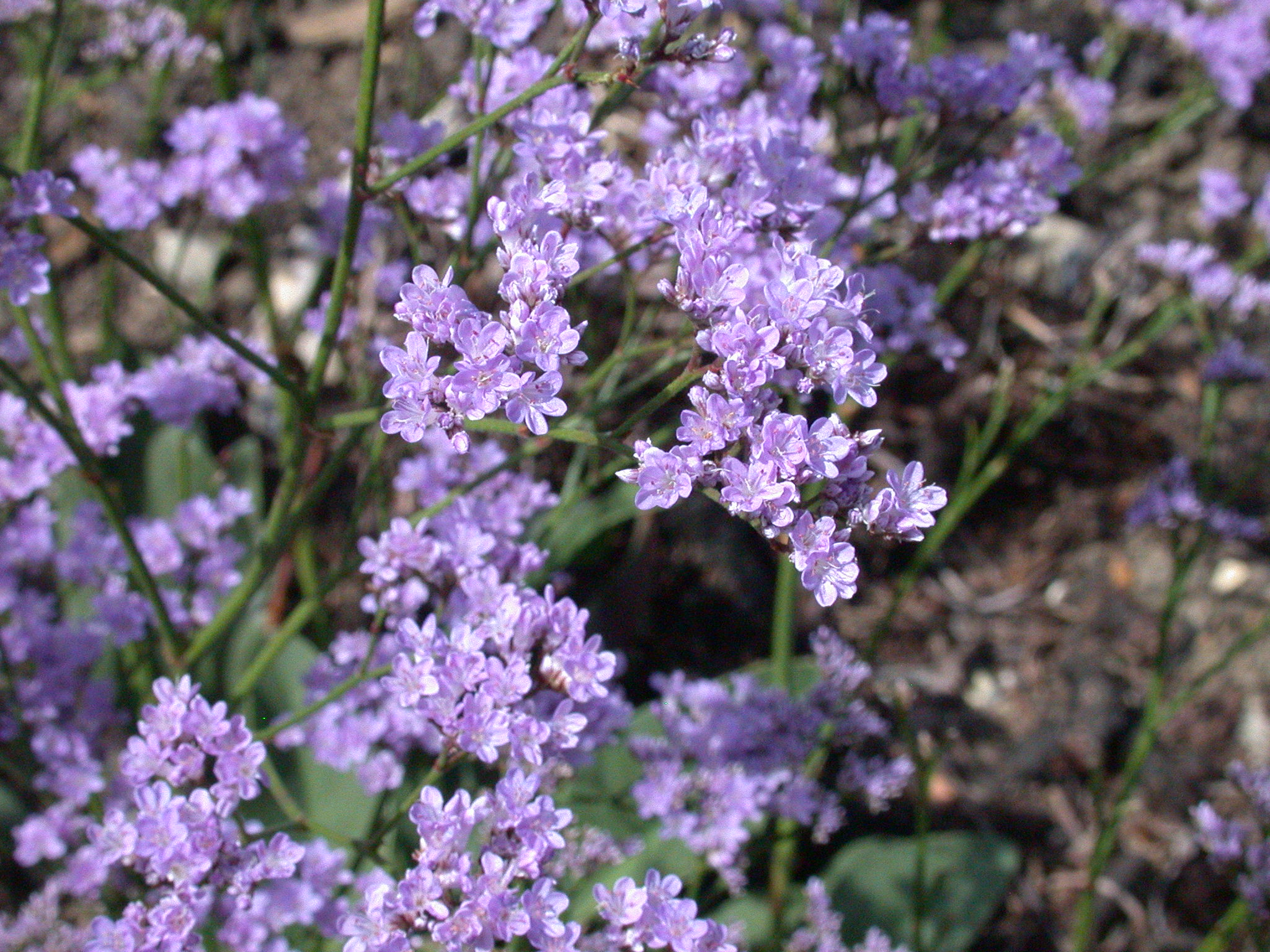

Scientific classification
- Kingdom: Plantae
- Clade: Tracheophytes
- Clade: Angiosperms
- Clade: Eudicots
- Order: Caryophyllales
- Family: Plumbaginaceae
- Genus: Limonium
- Species: L. humile

Binomial name
- Limonium humile Mill.

= Limonium humile =

Species of flowering plant

Limonium humile is a species of sea lavender known by the common name lax-flowered sea-lavender.
