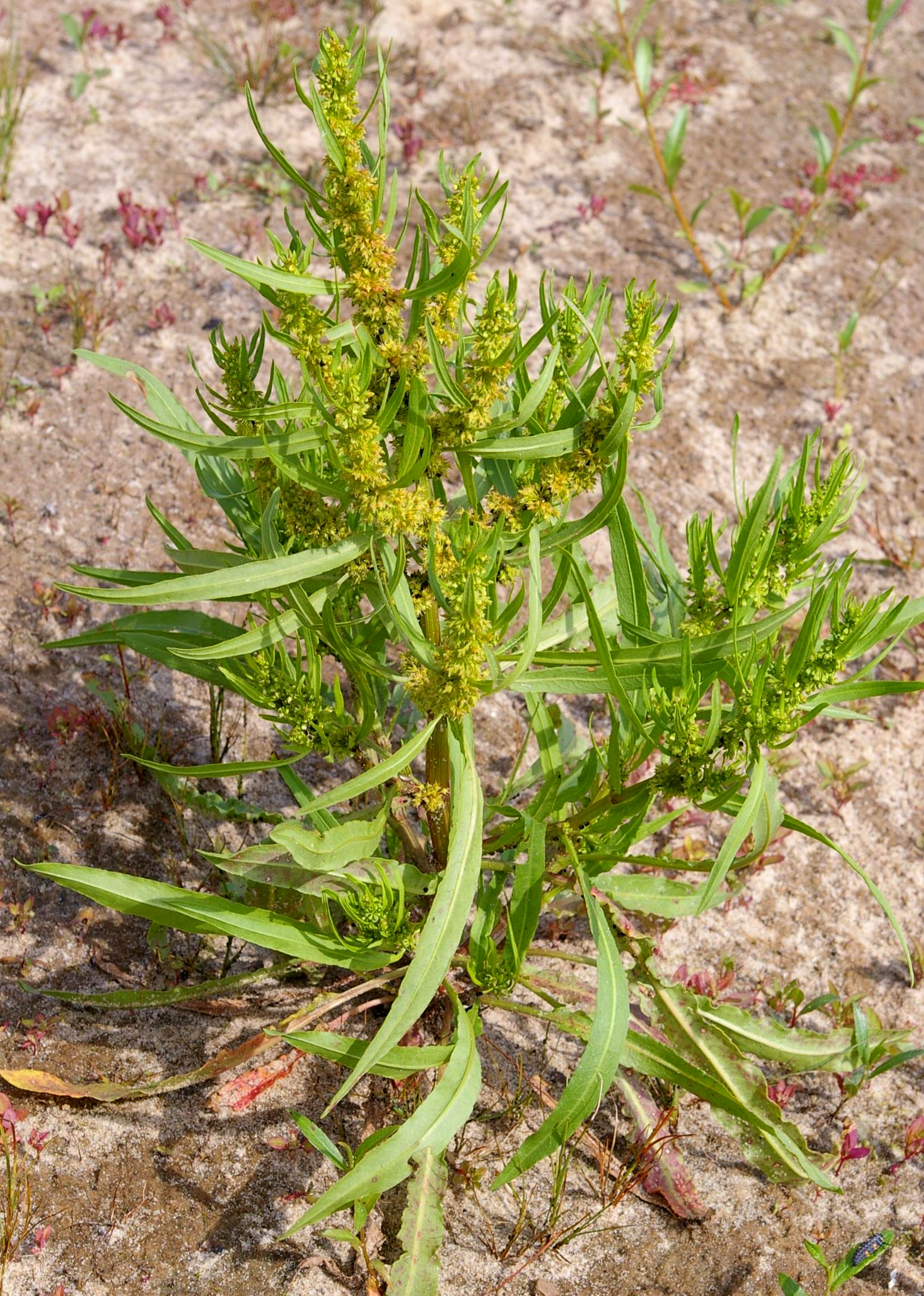

Scientific classification
- Kingdom: Plantae
- Clade: Tracheophytes
- Clade: Angiosperms
- Clade: Eudicots
- Order: Caryophyllales
- Family: Polygonaceae
- Genus: Rumex
- Species: R. maritimus

Binomial name
- Rumex maritimus L.

= Rumex maritimus =

Species of flowering plant

Rumex maritimus, commonly called golden dock, bristle dock, or seashore dock, is an annual plant species of the genus Rumex. Rumex D maritimus grows in Argentina, Burma, Canada, China, and the United States. It is native to Canada and most of the 48 states. The life span of Rumex maritimus is rarely biennial in moist environments. This herb belongs to the family Polygonaceae.

== Description ==
Rumex maritimus is composed of golden yellow or green/yellow inflorescences on its leaves and stem. The plant ranges to be 15 cm to 75 cm high from the base of the plant. The stems of the plant grows upward or laying close to the ground with pedicels as long as 3 to 8 cm. The leaves are wedged shaped, commonly narrow on both ends, but are rarely broadly wedded shaped. Its leaves range from 7 cm wide and 1.5 cm in height to 25 cm wide and 4 cm in height long containing blades that are lanceolate or lanceolate-linear. The flower of Rumex maritimus produces 15 to 30 triangular or rhombic triangular flowers ranging from 2.5 mm wide and .75 mm tall and 3mm wide to 1.2 mm tall.

== Distribution and habitat ==
Rumex maritimus is very rare in Ireland but has been recorded from County Cork, Ireland, from about 1870. In Britain it is noted as local. According to the U.S. federal government the Connecticut 'seaside dock' is in special concern for endangerment and in New York 'golden dock' is endangered. Also according to the U.S. federal government Rumex is classified as a noxious weed. Rumex maritimus frequently grow in areas that flood with water. Shoots that are elongated are grown during mid summer or summer, while shoots that are not elongated reproduce during its flooding season because the water transports its seeds.

== Uses ==
Most organs in Rumex maritimus are used for medical purposes. The seeds are used as sex stimulants, aphrodisiac. The leaves are used to cure external burns and ringworm. The roots of Rumex maritimus are used to cure skin diseases. Rumex maritimus is used for foods; for example, seeds are ground into powder and are used for porridge. The leaves are cooked as a vegetable.
