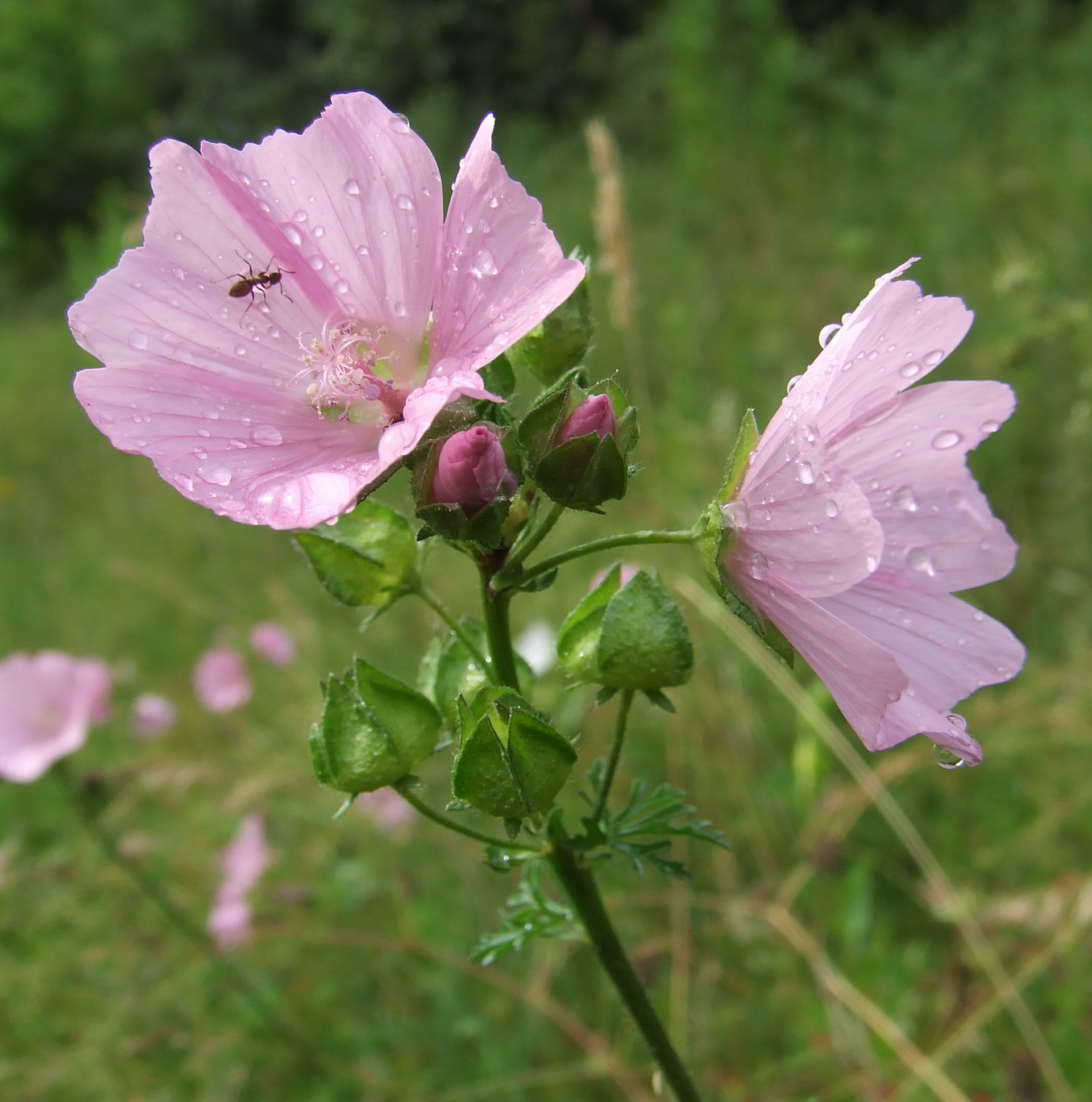
- Flowers

Scientific classification
- Kingdom: Plantae
- Clade: Tracheophytes
- Clade: Angiosperms
- Clade: Eudicots
- Clade: Rosids
- Order: Malvales
- Family: Malvaceae
- Genus: Malva
- Species: M. moschata

Binomial name
- Malva moschata L.

= Malva moschata =

Species of flowering plant

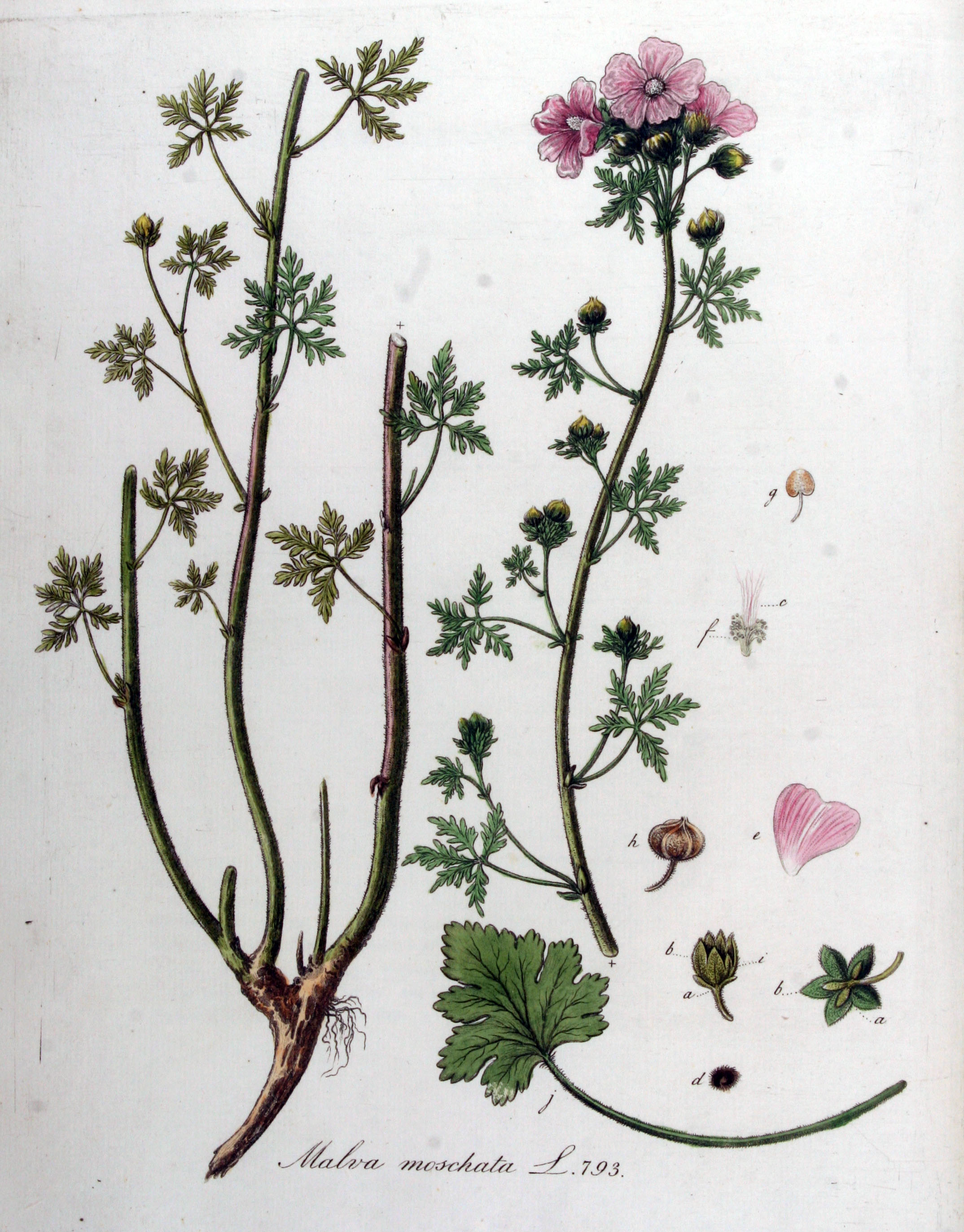
Illustration by Christiaan Sepp (1849)

Malva moschata, the musk mallow or musk-mallow, is a species of flowering plant in the family Malvaceae. It is a herbaceous plant producing pink, five-petaled flowers in summer. It is native to Eurasia and has been introduced elsewhere, being cultivated as an ornamental plant.

== Description ==
The perennial plant grows up to 60 centimetres (24 in) tall. It has hairy stems and foliage. The leaves are alternate, 2–8 cm (3/4–3 1/4 in) long and broad, palmately lobed with five to seven lobes. The basal leaves are very shallowly lobed, while those higher on the stems are deeply divided, with narrow, acuminate lobes.

Blooming in summer, flowers appear in clusters in the leaf axils, each flower 3.2–5 cm (1 1/4–2 in) in diameter, with five bright pink petals that have a truncated to notched apex; they have a distinctive musky odour. The fruit is a disc-shaped schizocarp 3–6 millimetres (1/8–1/4 in) in diameter, containing 10–16 seeds, the seeds individually enclosed in a mericarp covered in whitish hairs. It has a chromosome count of 2n=42.

Flower

Leaf

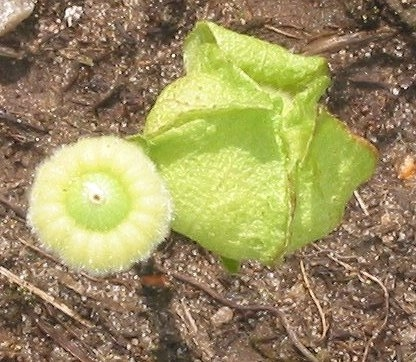
Fruit

== Distribution and habitat ==
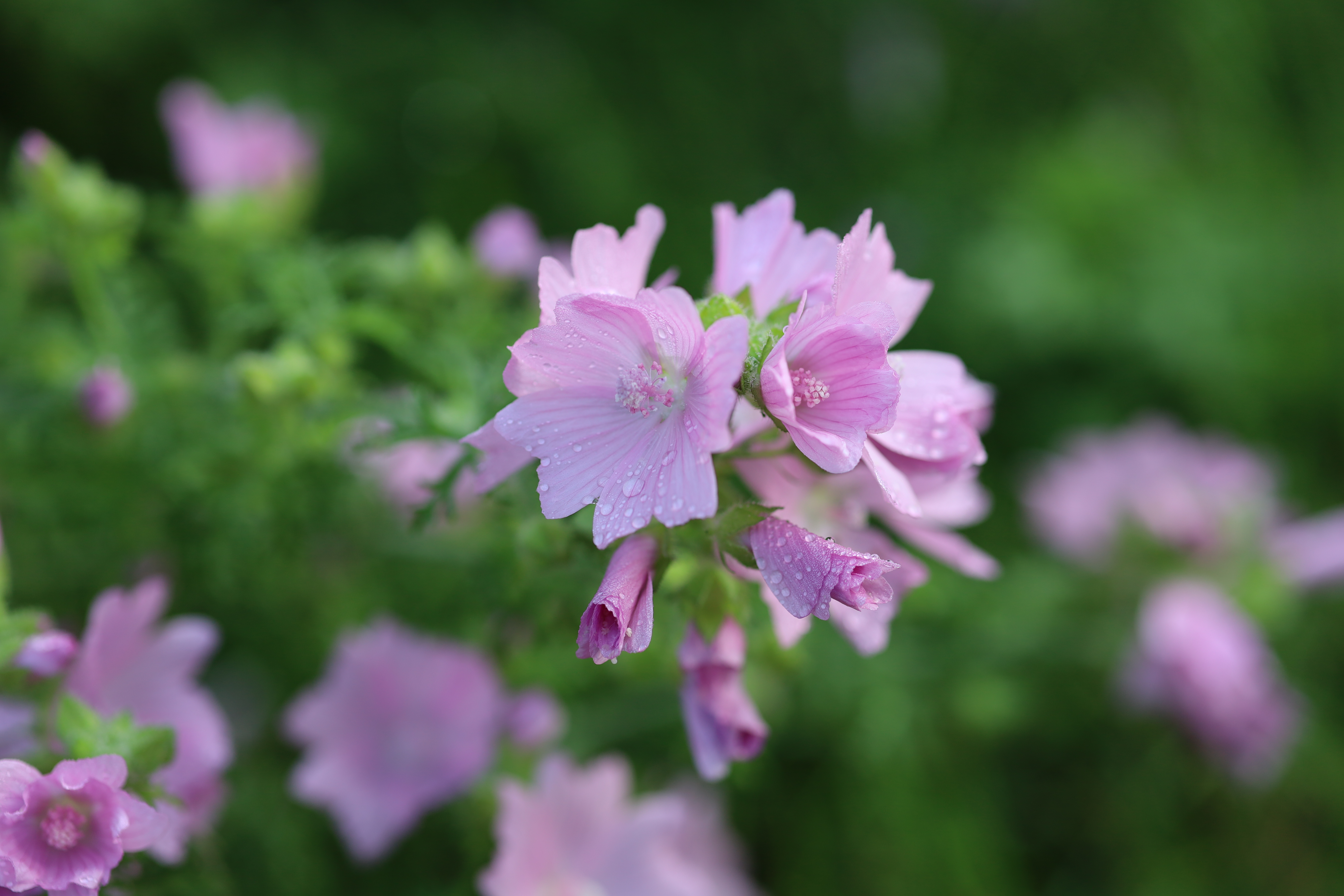
Deschambault-Grondines, Quebec, Canada

The species is native to Europe and southwestern Asia, from Spain north to the British Isles and Poland, and east to southern Russia and Turkey.

It has been introduced to and become naturalised in several areas with temperate climates away from its native range, including Scandinavia, New Zealand, and North America.

== Ecology ==
It occurs on dry, but fertile soils at altitudes from sea level up to 1,500 m (4,900 ft). Natural hybrids with the closely related Malva alcea are occasionally found.

The flowers are usually pollinated by bees.

== Uses ==
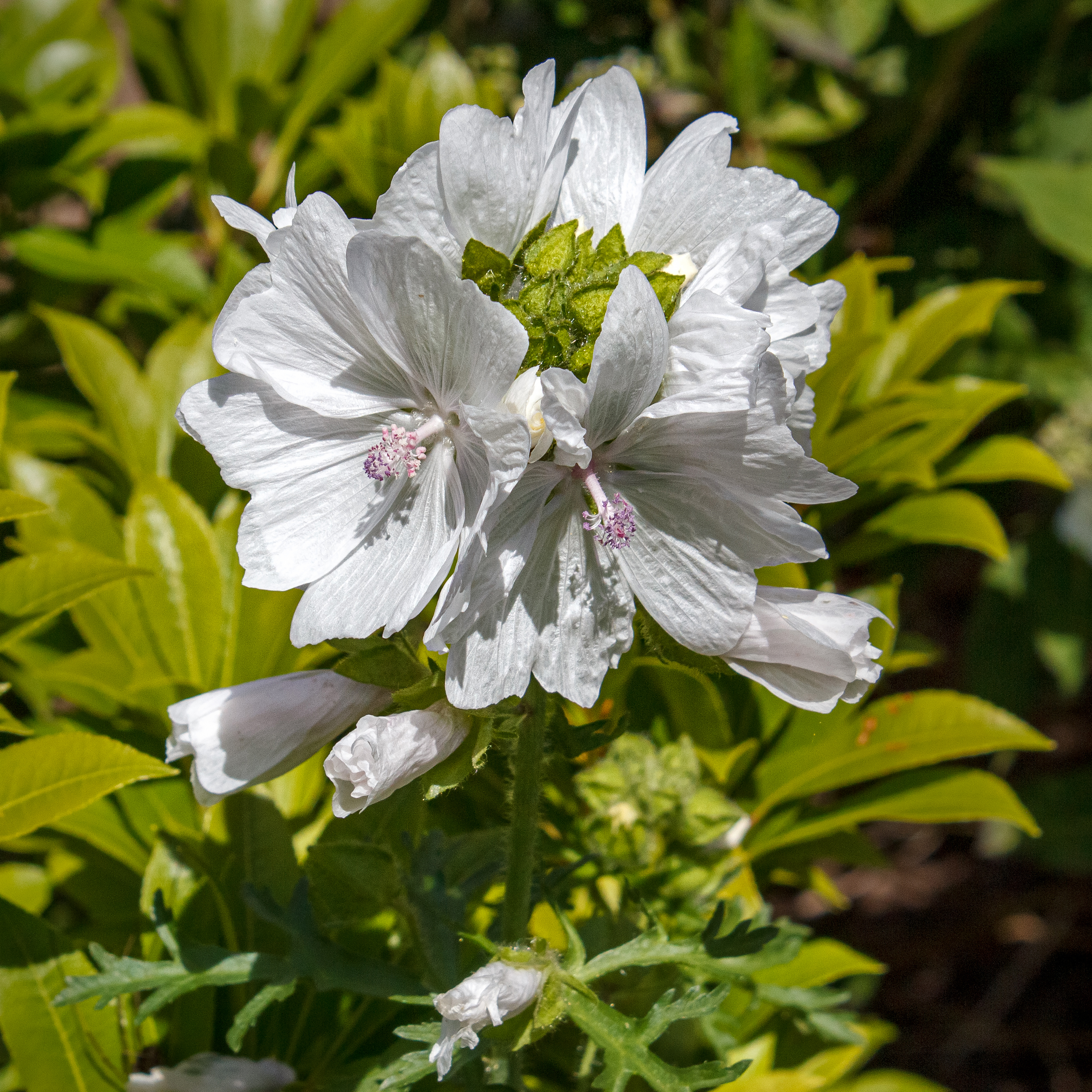
'Alba' with white flowers

Malva moschata is widely grown as an ornamental plant for its attractive scented flowers, produced for a long period through the summer. Several cultivars have been selected for variation in flower colour, including 'Rosea' with dark pink flowers.

The leaves and flowers can be added to salads. The seeds are also edible.
