= Colne Point =

Nature reserve in Essex, England

Coordinates: 51.771°N 1.054°E

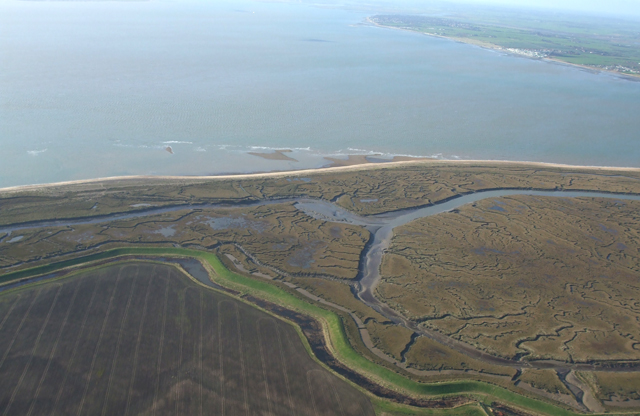
- Interactive map of Colne Point
- Type: Nature reserve
- Location: St Osyth, Essex
- OS grid: TM 108 125
- Area: 276.4 hectares (683 acres)
- Manager: Essex Wildlife Trust

Colne Point is a 276.4-hectare (683-acre) nature reserve south-west of St Osyth in Essex. It is managed by the Essex Wildlife Trust. It is part of the Colne Estuary Site of Special Scientific Interest, national nature reserve, Ramsar site, Nature Conservation Review site and Special Protection Area. It is also part of the Essex Estuaries Special Area of Conservation.

The site is shingle surrounding saltmarsh, and Ray Creek flows through it. It is a breeding ground for many birds, and a feeding area for migrants. There are many invertebrates which are on the IUCN Red List of Threatened Species, and flora include the nationally rare golden samphire and small cord-grass.

There is access to the reserve from the road between St Osyth and Lee Wick Farm. Some areas are liable to flooding at high tides.
