= Crossways railway station =

Former railway station in England

Crossways

General information
- Location: Jaywick, Essex; England
- Coordinates: 51.7802°N 1.115°E
- Platforms: 1

Other information
- Status: Disused

History
- Original company: Jaywick Miniature Railway

Key dates
- 31 July 1936: station opens
- September 1939: station closes
Location

Crossways railway station was the upper terminus of the short-lived Jaywick Miniature Railway in Essex, England.

Crossways had a single platform made of concrete (that at Jaywick Sands was of wood) which had bench seating and palisade fencing. The station had a water tank and a coal bunker. The tank would seem to have been moved some time after opening. Beside the station was a large sales office used by Tudor Estate Company which marketed Jaywick as a resort.

The station closed along with the line in 1939, and unlike Jaywick Sands, did not reopen for the 1949 season. The site of the station is now beneath the front garden of a private residence. When foundations were excavated there for a new front wall, the old concrete platform was uncovered by accident.

Preceding station	Disused railways	Following station
Terminus	Jaywick Miniature Railway	Jaywick Sands
