= Soft Ices =

Soft Ices is an arts project by the artist Mark Storer and composer Jules Maxwell. Mark and Jules have been travelling around Jaywick in an ice cream van, which has been given a new lease of life as a recording studio, persuading local people to literally ‘sing for their supper’. In return for their songs, they are rewarded with free ice creams. Samples of their songs will be transformed into a piece of music which will be broadcast at the Tower's opening. All those who recorded a song will be invited to collect their book, and anyone else who attends the event will also receive a book.

== Description ==
From the Jaywick Martello Tower one hundred red ribbons, held by children, flutter from the rooftop to the ground, where they are pegged down. On the roof, there is another tower, a gift, a box full of books. Encased in the books a CD lies. The Martello Tower is like a giant Maypole, around its base Carolina the ice cream van circles around and around, in a clockwise direction. From the ice cream van, haunting music is heard. Hundreds of peoples voices, fragments of songs, lullabies float out into the sky. We all wait, watching. From some distance away the strange, yet beautiful melody is interrupted by the hum of a small plane. The plane flies into view and heads in the direction of the Tower, training a brightly coloured banner. As it approaches it begins to circle anticlockwise. Seven times it circumscribes the Tower. On its seventh circuit confetti falls from the plane showering the Tower and the ground below. The ribbons are released and flutter to the ground. The sound from Carolina grows in intensity. This magical opening of the Tower on 17 September 2005 was the culmination of a year-long art project, Soft Ices.
