= Colne Estuary =

Nature reserve in Essex, England

Coordinates: 51.810°N 0.979°E

- Site of Special Scientific Interest
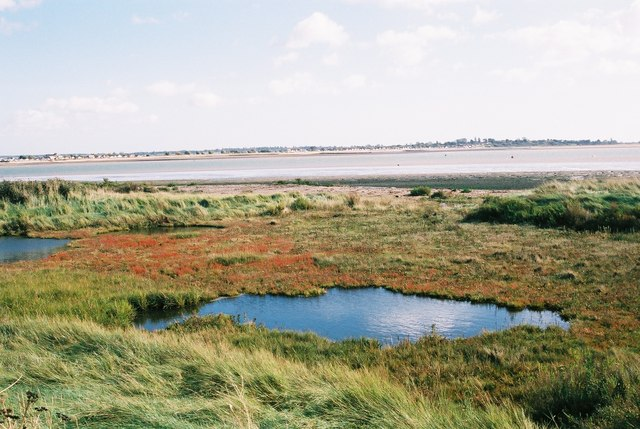
- Location of Colne Estuary.
- Area of search: Essex
- Grid reference: TM075155
- Interest: Biological; Geological
- Area: 2,915.2 ha (7,204 acres)
- Notification date: 1989
- Location map: Magic Map

Designations

Ramsar Wetland
- Official name: Colne Estuary
- Designated: 28 July 1994
- Reference no.: 665

Colne Estuary is a 2915 hectare biological and geological Site of Special Scientific Interest near Brightlingsea in Essex. It is also a Nature Conservation Review site, a National Nature Reserve, a Ramsar wetland site of international importance, a Special Protection Area, a Special Area of Conservation, and a Geological Conservation Review site. Three areas in the site are managed by the Essex Wildlife Trust, Colne Point, Fingringhoe Wick and Howlands Marsh.

The site has varied habitats, such as saltmarsh, mud flats, shingle spits and former gravel pits. It is of international importance for wintering brent geese and black-tailed godwits, and of national importance for six other bird species, including little terns. It also has important assemblages of invertebrates and plants, such as golden samphire and shrubby seablite. A peat seam in St Osyph Marsh has been dated to 4280 BP, and this marsh is important for saltmarsh morphology.

There are important geological exposures for Pleistocene studies at East Mersea; investigation is at an early stage, but they show warm climate deposits from one or more post-Anglian interglacials.
