= Point Clear =

Village in Essex, England

Coordinates: 51.793°N 1.040°E

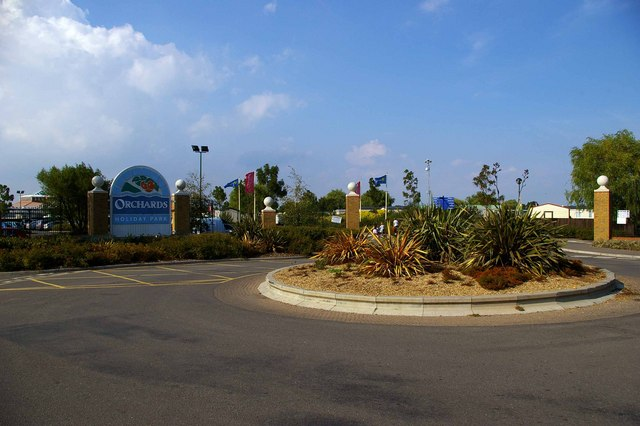
- Roundabout at the entrance to Orchards Holiday Park

- Location within Essex
- Area: 1.22 km^{2} (0.47 sq mi)
- Population: 1,674 (2018 estimate)
  - Density: 1,372/km^{2} (3,550/sq mi)
- Civil parish: St Osyth
- District: Tendring
- Shire county: Essex
- Region: East
- Country: England
- Sovereign state: United Kingdom

Point Clear is a village in the civil parish of St Osyth, south-west of the village of St Osyth and on the other side of St Osyth Creek, a branch of the Colne Estuary in the Tendring district, in the county of Essex, England. In 2018 it had an estimated population of 1674.

== History ==
The first evidence of habitation in the Point Clear area comes from archaeological remains dated to the 6th century. While the purpose of the structure is now unclear, it was likely connected to the fishing industry.

Throughout much of history, Point Clear has been an agricultural area. A map from 1777 shows a farm, Blockhouse Wick, in the area. The name Point Clear is not attested until 1880.

Two Martello Towers, the first on the east coast, were built against a possible invasion by Napoleon in 1809. The southern one, level with the roundabout and bus stop, was used as a naturalist's holiday home, and later an amateur radio station and test site for Marconi's. It was pulled down in the 1960s and bungalows now stand on the site. The northern tower was used by the Navy in both world wars, and the minefield control and signals bunker added in 1940 can still be seen on top. For many years a tea shop was attached. It is now the East Essex Aviation Museum. In the Second World War the whole area was strongly fortified, and was a Royal Navy and Marines landing craft training base.

Until 1940, a line of beach huts ran right down to the tip of the Peninsula at St Osyth Stone – nowadays that area is open, but many new houses have been added on the road back towards St Osyth village.

From Point Clear, it is possible to see the now much expanded town of Brightlingsea. Further in the distance, visitors will be able to see Mersea Island. Although Point Clear is located on the coast, there is no boating tradition. There are many elderly bungalows and chalets, which can only be used as holiday homes, due to the risk of flooding during the winter months. A track before you reach Point Clear takes visitors down to the village of Lee-over-Sands. There is a pub housed in the Martello Tower and a small cafe in Point Clear. The present Orchards Caravan Park is a much expanded version of a smaller camp and houses touring caravans and mobile homes.
