= Howlands Marsh =

Nature reserve in Essex, England

Coordinates: 51.811°N 1.067°E

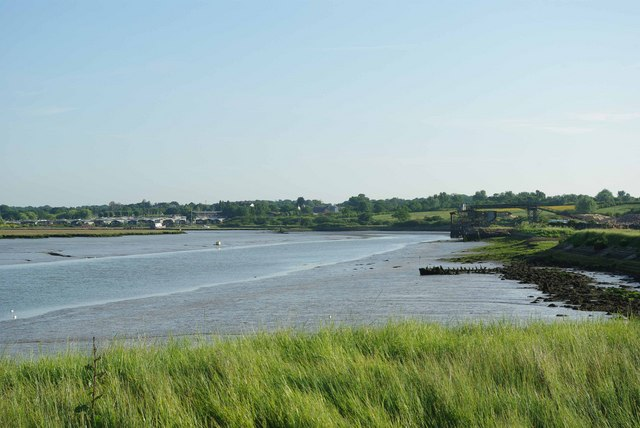
- Interactive map of Howlands Marsh
- Type: Nature reserve
- Location: St Osyth, Essex
- OS grid: TM 115 169
- Area: 29.9 hectares (74 acres)
- Manager: Essex Wildlife Trust

Howlands Marsh is a 29.9-hectare (74-acre) nature reserve north-east of St Osyth in Essex. It is managed by the Essex Wildlife Trust. It is part of the Colne Estuary Site of Special Scientific Interest Special Protection Area and Ramsar site, and the Blackwater Flats and Marshes Nature Conservation Review site.

This site is marshy grassland, which is low lying and hummocky, and divided by water channels. There are also areas of saltmarsh, which has sea wormwood and golden samphire. Breeding birds include reed warblers, skylarks, lapwings and reed buntings.

There is access by a footpath from the B1027 road.
