= Jaywick Sands railway station =

Former railway station in England

Coordinates: 51.77386°N 1.11092°E

Jaywick Sands

General information
- Location: Clacton-on-Sea, Essex; England
- Platforms: 1

Other information
- Status: Disused

History
- Original company: Jaywick Miniature Railway

Key dates
- 31 July 1936: station opens
- September 1939: station closes
- Summer 1949: station re-opens and closes

Jaywick Sands railway station was the lower terminus of the 18-inch gauge Jaywick Miniature Railway in Essex, UK.

== History ==
Jaywick Sands had a single platform built of wood, which was provided with a single wooden bench, palisade fencing and electric lamps. Jaywick Sands also (unlike Crossways) had a small wooden ticket-office, though most tickets were sold on the trains. Because the JMR had no turntable, the locomotives always ran tender-first into Jaywick Sands.

The original route of the JMR closed in 1939, but in 1949, the lower half was briefly re-opened, running during the 1949 summer season only. The section in question would have been midway round the 180-degree curve, around 1/2 mile (0.80 km) from Jaywick Sands.

Preceding station	Disused railways	Following station
Terminus	Jaywick Miniature Railway	Crossways
