= Ursula Kemp =

English cunning woman and midwife (c. 1525-1582)

Ursula Kemp or Ursley Kempe alias Grey (ca. 1525 – 1582) was an English cunning woman and midwife who in 1582 was tried for witchcraft and hanged. Kemp was accused of (and apparently confessed to) using familiars to kill and bring sickness to her neighbour.

== Biography ==
Kemp was born in St Osyth, Essex. She was a cunning woman who was frequently called upon by her neighbours to heal ailments and sicknesses. Kemp as a cunning person meant that she was trusted in her community to heal and protect by use of folk medicine. She was not seen as a threat initially. She was later blamed for intentionally causing illness and death, eventually being tried for witchcraft in Chelmsford in February 1582. Kemp is referenced in discussions about historical context of folk magic and witchcraft practices due to accusations of witchcraft being popular at the time. She was part of the lower class and made a living by midwifery, harlotry, and white witchcraft. She was tricked/ fooled into giving up names of other women who were participating in witchcraft and having familiars in St Osyth. At her trial, several of her neighbours testified against her, making statements to Justice Brian Darcy. She was one of 14 women who would have indictments set against her and one of two women who were hanged (the other being Elizabeth Bennett). Along with her friend Alice Newman, she was accused of causing the deaths of Edna Stratton and two children, Joan Thurlow and Elizabeth Letherdale. Kemp's story reflects the transition from folk practices to more formal accusations of witchcraft, and is an example of what earlier accusations look like compared to the accusations during the modern period.

== The Trial for Kemp ==
Kemp's trial was more formal due to her accusations being rooted in fear thought of malicious supernatural harm to others as well as an execution compared to later accustations being rooted in a more organized process in using Malleus Maleficarum (1487). She lived in a small community where small grudges and disagreements are more prevalent. During this time of the barter system being used, Kemp's accusations and trial included a lot of begging and bargaining for results. She only gave up names due to her receiving perceived freedom, which turned out to be false later on. Due to her history of quarrels with women in her community, accusations followed since this was one of the easier ways to get back at someone in a small community during this time.

Neighbour and former friend Grace Thurlow testified that when her son Davy was sick, she asked for Kemp's help. Davy temporarily recovered from his illness and Thurlow believed that Kemp had cured him. It was reported that Kemp cured Thurlow's son by using incantations. Some time later, Thurlow and Kemp argued over the care of Thurlow's baby daughter Joan. At a few months old, Joan fell from her cradle and died of a broken neck. When Thurlow became lame, she again asked for Kemp's help. Thurlow's lameness that she contracted was crippling arthritis. Kemp agreed to heal her for 12 pence. Thurlow got better but then refused to pay Kemp her fee, saying she could not afford it. The two women argued again and Kemp threatened to get even with Thurlow, who became lame again. Thurlow testified that since that quarrel, either she or her son had suffered. She blamed Kemp for her son's illness, her own lameness, and the death of her baby. Thurlow complained to the magistrate and an investigation followed.

Alice Letherdale testified that Kemp had asked her for some scouring sand (an abrasive cleaner) and that she had refused her, knowing Kemp to be a "naughty beast". Letherdale's daughter Elizabeth later saw Kemp, who "murmured" at her. When Elizabeth fell ill and died, Letherdale blamed Kemp for bewitching the girl to death. Thomas Rabbet (Kemp's son) was noted to have been persuaded by Justice Darcy to testify against his mother saying that she used witchcraft. Kemp's eight-year-old son Thomas testified that his mother kept four spirits, or familiars. Kemp admitted to having had two girl spirits punish people with lameness and other diseases of bodily harm and to destroy cattle. She claimed to have two boy spirits who punished others by killing them. He described them as a grey cat called Tyffin, a white lamb called Tyttey, a black toad called Pygine and a black cat called Jacke. He said that he had seen his mother give her familiars beer and cake, and let them suck blood from her body. Thomas said that he had been present when Alice Newman had visited his mother. He said that his mother had given Newman an earthenware pot, which he believed to contain the familiars. Days later, he saw Newman return telling Kemp that she had sent spirits to kill a local man and his wife.

Overall, her trial, which followed two rounds of accusations, displayed consistent patterns in both the nature of the charges and the context in which they were brought forward. Much of the evidence recorded during the proceedings was presented in the first person, including statements and testimonies that could only have been heard by Justice Brian Darcy himself, suggesting that the case may have been influenced by his personal involvement and authority in the matter. Justice Brian Darcy was a committed witch hunter in the 1500s, known for leading many witch trials, including the case of Ursula Kemp, where he played a key role in accusing and condemning those believed to be witches. Kemp is guessed to have resided in “The Cage” which was a type of prison and form of public humiliation and confinement. During her trial, she possibly spent time in this small space that was barred and sometimes suspended in public places like market squares or outside castles.

== Confession ==
Justice Brian Darcy said that Kemp made a full confession to him in private. Kemp told him that approximately ten years previously, she had experienced a "lameness in her bones". She had gone to a local cunning woman who had told Kemp that she had been bewitched and that she should "unwitch" herself. She recommended a ritual to Kemp using hog's dung, charnell, sage and St John's wort. Kemp performed the ritual and recovered. Two women who she knew requested her help for lameness. She helped them in the same way that she had helped herself, and they apparently recovered. Since then she had performed healing services for her neighbours. She admitted to the four familiars her son had mentioned. She said that they were two male spirits, that killed people, and two female spirits, who brought sickness to people, and destroyed cattle. Kemp went on to confess to sending her familiars to make Grace Thurlow lame and to kill Joan Thurlow, Elizabeth Letherdale and Kemp's sister-in-law. She named twelve other women as witches, six of whom were hanged, including Kemp, in 1582. Many of the accused freely confessed to witchcraft despite knowing they faced death as a result.

== Death ==
Ursula Kemp was hanged alongside Elizabeth Bennett in Chelmsford in 1582. In 1921, the skeletons of two women were found in a St Osyth garden by Charles Brooker, one of which was believed to be that of Kemp. The 'witches skeletons' became a local tourist attraction with an admission charge to view them. In 2007, historian Alison Rowlands said that according to her research, the skeletons could belong to any of ten women who were executed for witchcraft in the 16th and 17th centuries. A more recent forensic study suggests that the bones are of Roman-era provenance.

Additionally, Kemp's body was noted to have been dipped in pitch and left on the gallows for four weeks. In 1921, Charles Brooker two skeletons mentioned above, one believed to be Kemp's, buried on a north–south axis with iron rivets through their joints, suggesting they were witches. The remains, purchased in 1963 by Cecil Williamson for the Museum of Witchcraft, were displayed in a purple silk-lined coffin. This exhumation was televised, which drew public attention to her story and the superstitions surrounding her death. Williamsom also found iron spikes, which could be connected to centuries-old custom meant to prevent those believed to be witches, restless spirits, or even vampires from leaving their graves to disturb the living. Later, in 1999, they were sold to Robert Lenkiewicz, who used them to enhance the atmosphere of his library. Following Lenkiewicz's death, the remains returned to the Museum of Witchcraft, though controversy persists about whether they truly belonged to Kemp or another executed woman from that era.

== See also ==
- St Osyth Witches
- witch-hunt
- Elizabeth Bennett (alleged witch)

== Sources ==
- "Ursley Kempe". Dinner Party Database of Notable Women. Brooklyn Museum. 11 March 2007.
- Gibson, Marion (2000). Early modern witches: witchcraft cases in contemporary writing By. Routledge. pp. 82–86. ISBN 0-415-21579-X.
- Hester, M. (1992). Lewd Women and Wicked Witches : A Study in the Dynamics of Male Domination. Routledge. pp. 176–180. ISBN 0-415-05209-2.
- Gibson, Marion (1999). Reading Witchcraft: Stories of Early English Witches. Routledge. pp. 33–34. ISBN 0-415-20645-6.
- Rowlands, Alison. "BONES OF CONTENTION". Centre for Local and Regional History. University of Essex. Archived from the original on 25 September 2012.
- Semmens, Jason., "The Posthumous Adventures of Ursula Kemp," in Godwin, Kerriann. (ed.), The Museum of Witchcraft—A Magical History (Boscastle: Occult Art Company, 2011) pp. 117, 118.
