= St Osyth's Priory =

Grade I listed priory in St Osyth, Essex, England

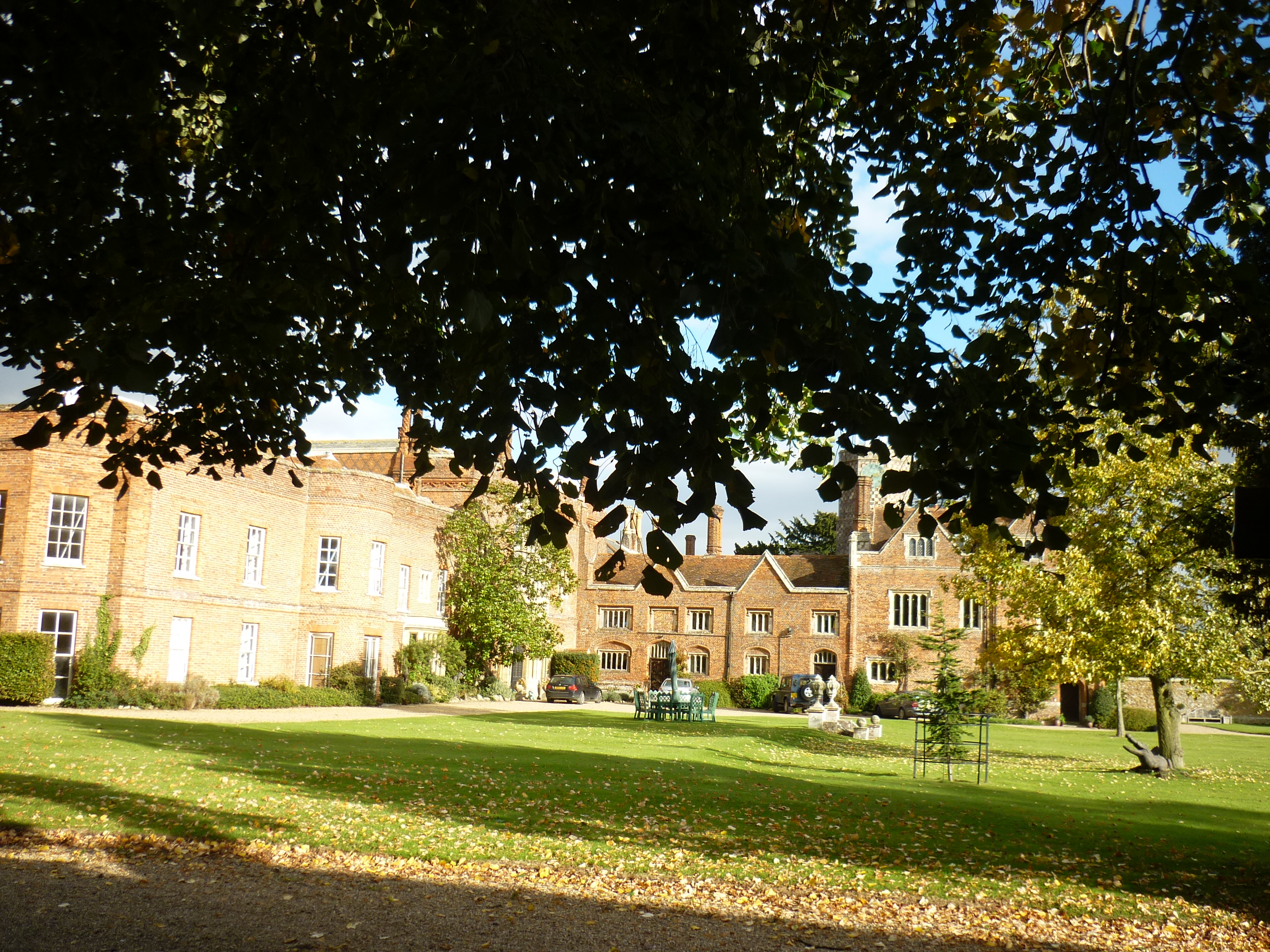
- St Osyth's Priory

- Location within Essex
- 51°47′57″N 1°04′30″E
- Location: St Osyth

Site notes
- Area: Essex

Listed Building – Grade I
- Official name: St Osyth's Priory: The Abbot's Lodging and South Wing, the Darcy Clock Tower and C18 House (formerly listed as the Convalescent Home).
- Designated: 21 February 1950
- Reference no.: 1337158

Listed Building – Grade I
- Official name: St Osyth's Priory ruined east ranges of the Darcy House including the Tower and Chapel
- Designated: 21 February 1950
- Reference no.: 1337159

Listed Building – Grade I
- Official name: St Osyth's Priory, Gatehouse and East and West flanking Ranges
- Designated: 21 February 1950
- Reference no.: 1111495

Listed Building – Grade II*
- Official name: St Osyth's Priory, Tithe Barn adjoining the west range of Gatehouse
- Designated: 21 February 1950
- Reference no.: 1308972

Listed Building – Grade II*
- Official name: St Osyth's Priory: West Barn and Baliffs Cottage
- Designated: 21 February 1950
- Reference no.: 1166310

St Osyth's Abbey (originally and still commonly known as St Osyth's Priory) is a historic monastic site and former country house in St Osyth, Essex, England. Originating as an Augustinian abbey and one of the county’s most prominent medieval religious houses, it was dissolved in 1539 and subsequently developed into a major landed estate. The priory complex preserves substantial monastic fabric together with significant later additions made by the Darcy and Rivers families, and by the Nassau de Zuylestein family, Earls of Rochford, who reshaped the house and landscape in the 18th century. Now a scheduled monument containing numerous listed buildings, St Osyth's Priory is regarded as one of the most architecturally and historically important heritage estates in Essex.

== History ==
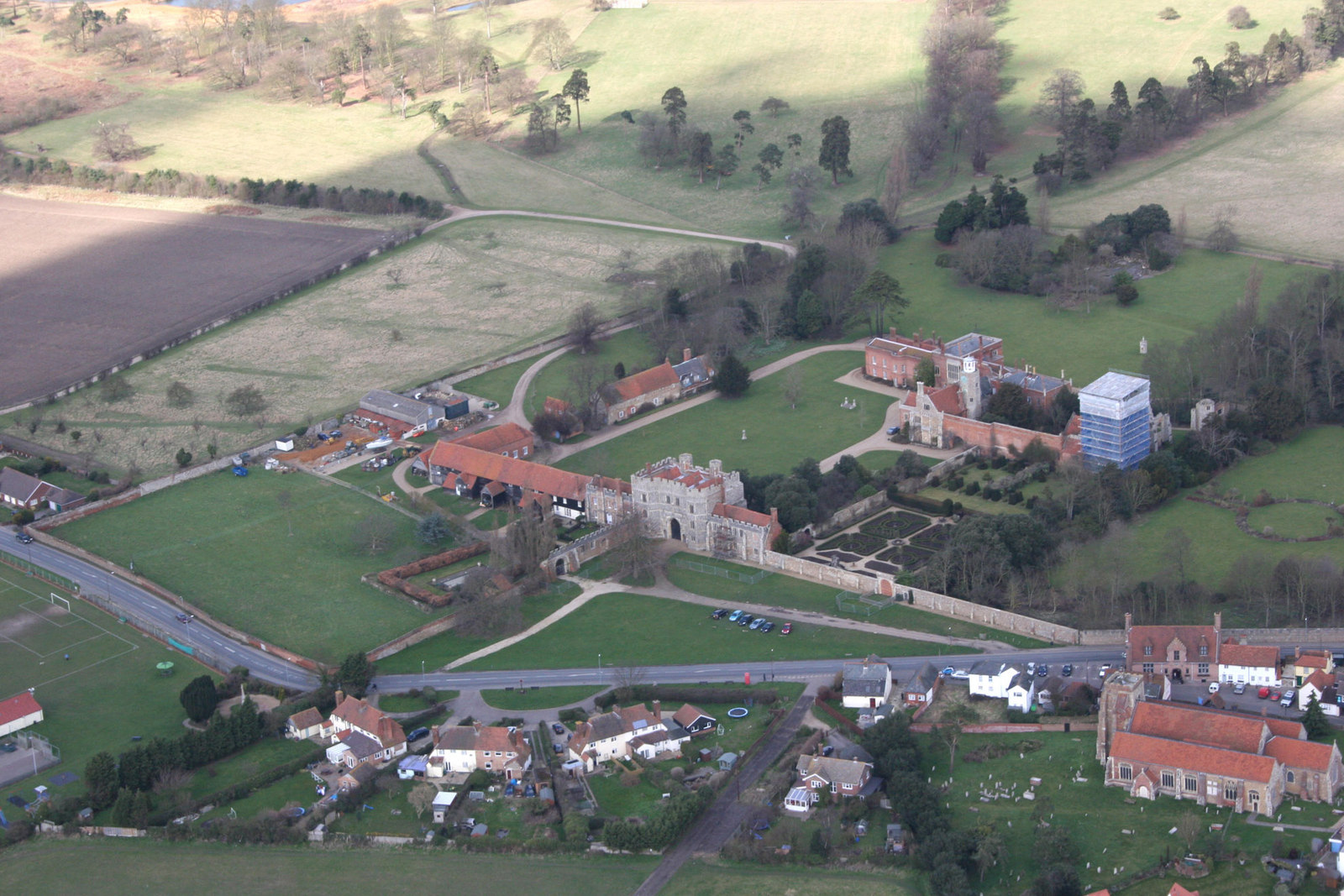
The Priory seen from the air

=== Augustine Monastery ===
St Osyth's Abbey was a house of Augustine Canons Regular in the parish of St Osyth (then named Chich) in Essex, England in use from the 12th to 16th centuries. Founded by Richard de Belmeis, Bishop of London, c. 1121, it became one of the largest religious houses in Essex. It was dedicated to Saints Peter and Paul as well as St Osyth (Osgyth or Osith), a royal saint and virgin martyr. Bishop Richard obtained the arm bone of St Osyth from Aylesbury for the monastic church and granted the canons the parish church of St Osyth.

The foundation began as a priory, probably populated first by canons from Holy Trinity Priory, Aldgate. The first prior of St Osyth's was William de Corbeil, who was elected archbishop of Canterbury in 1123 and who crowned King Stephen in 1135. The priory was converted into an abbey in the mid-12th century.

In the Gesta Pontificum Anglorum, William of Malmesbury spoke in praise of the piety and learning of the canons at St Osyth in the 12th century. One of the second generation of canons there was William de Vere, later bishop of Hereford, who wrote a Latin Life of St Osyth, in which he mentions that his mother Adeliza, daughter of Gilbert fitz Richard of Clare, Suffolk, had been a corrodian or pensioner at the abbey for twenty years of her widowhood.

A charter of King Henry II confirmed the right of the canons of St Osyth's Priory to elect their abbot and to hold a market every Sunday at Chich in the later 12th century.

John Depyng, prior of St Botolph's Priory in Colchester, was made abbot of St Osyth's Priory in 1434, and took with him goods of considerable value belonging to the priory. He never returned these, and after his death St Botolph's brought an apparently unsuccessful lawsuit in Chancery against St Osyth's Priory for their recovery.

=== Dissolution, the Darcy and Rivers family ===
During the Dissolution of the Monasteries, the religious group was dissolved by King Henry VIII in 1539, at which time there were a prior and sixteen canons. The king granted it to his minister Thomas Cromwell, but on his fall from favour, the abbey and its estates were returned to crown possession. In the reign of King Edward VI, St Osyth's Priory was sold for just under £400 in 1553 to Thomas Darcy, later the first Lord Darcy, who converted the monastic complex into a substantial country house . His rebuilding incorporated large parts of the medieval ranges, and his distinctive chequer-work masonry remains visible on the Abbot’s Tower, the northern and western ranges, and the Clock Tower. The estate passed through the Darcy and Rivers families, though it suffered heavily during the English Civil War: in 1642 the house of Elizabeth Savage, Countess Rivers, was plundered and left damaged and uninhabitable for decades. By 1671 St Osyth's had regained its status, with Hearth Tax returns recording 76 hearths, making it the fourth-largest house in Essex.

=== The Nassau-Zuylestein family: Earls of Rochford ===
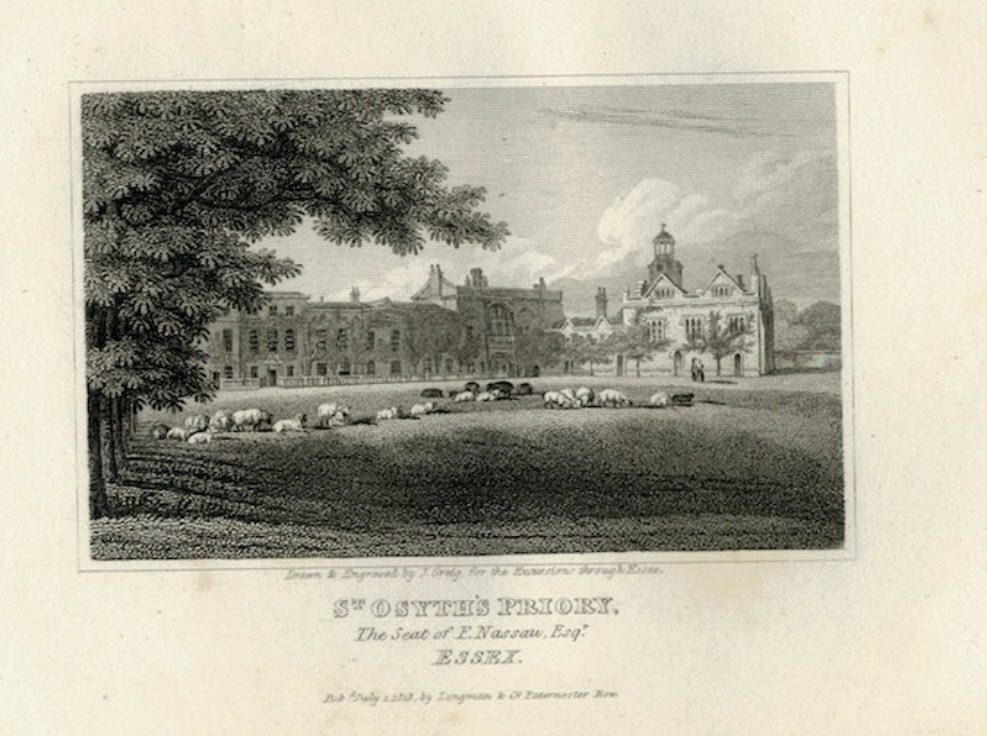
St Osyth Priory in the time of the Earls of Rochford. Most of the Georgian House was demolished in the 19th century

A significant transformation occurred in 1712–14 when the estate came into the possession of Frederic Nassau de Zuylestein, 3rd Earl of Rochford. He is generally regarded as the principal architect of the elegant 18th-century house at St Osyth. The 3rd Earl concentrated his works on the west wing of the old Darcy House and extended westwards into the former Bishop’s Lodging, creating a sophisticated suite of reception rooms arranged around a partial quadrangle. One of the rooms was decorated with Swiss landscapescreated to offer Frederic’s Swiss wife a reminder of her homeland. His improvements also included an oval carriage sweep and new gardens on the site of the monastic cemetery, together with alterations to the Gatehouse and its western range, many features of which survive.

The architectural and landscape legacy of the estate was further shaped by his son, William Henry Nassau de Zuylestein, 4th Earl of Rochford. A diplomat and accomplished plantsman, he added a two-storey range linking his father’s new house to the Bishop’s Lodging, forming much of the surviving 18th-century structure. He also remodelled the wider landscape in accordance with contemporary taste: the northern lodges, the ha-ha, the pleasure grounds, and the early introduction of the Lombardy poplar into England (c. 1768) all belong to this period. Financial pressures later forced the 4th Earl to dispose of parts of the estate, and in 1781 the reduced property passed to his natural son, Frederic Nassau.

Frederic Nassau modernised the house around 1800, and the estate remained in this form until the death of his son William in 1857, after which maintenance declined. The property was sold in 1858, and Charles Brandreth purchased the priory buildings for £12,000. Most of the Georgian house created by the Earls of Rochford was demolished in 1859, leaving only fragments of the 18th-century ranges and the medieval monastic structures. Briefly inhabited by the Brandreth family and later leased, St Osyth's subsequently ceased to function as a great aristocratic residence, though the imprint of the Rochford family remains fundamental to its surviving architectural character.

=== 19th century ===
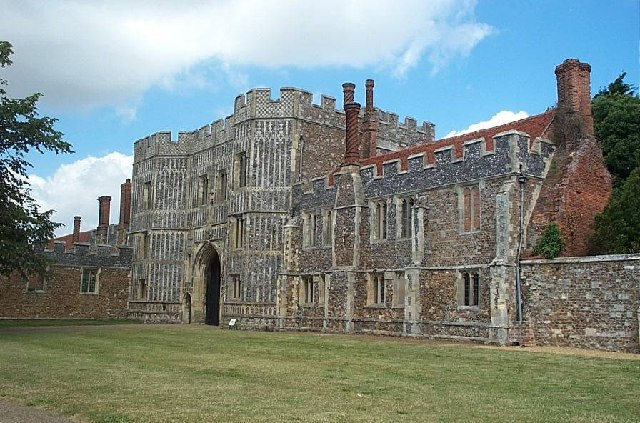
St Osyth Priory Gatehouse

Following the sale of the dilapidated estate in 1863, Sir John Johnson undertook major rebuilding works at St Osyth's Priory. He demolished a number of surviving structures behind Abbot Vintoner’s medieval screen wall and created the richly appointed apartments of Darcy House, while extending new service ranges to the east. Johnson also converted the former monks’ dorter into a chapel and laid out several ornamental features that remain part of the landscape today, including the Japanese garden, lily pond, and the topiary and rose gardens. After his death in 1909, the estate passed to his adoptive daughter, Lady Cowley, but fell again into decline and was sold in 1920.

In 1948 the priory was acquired by a Friendly Society as a convalescent home, and in 1954 it was purchased by the writer Somerset de Chair, who undertook limited restoration of the Gatehouse and adjacent ranges. His period of ownership was marked by substantial losses to the historic estate: the North Lodges and workers’ cottages were demolished, large areas of parkland were sold for gravel extraction, and significant tracts of the estate were disposed of. Although part of the Wentworth Woodhouse art collection—through his marriage to Juliet Wentworth Fitzwilliam—was exhibited at St Osyth's and attracted considerable public interest, long-term investment remained insufficient. After de Chair’s death in 1995, several attempts to sell the estate failed until its eventual purchase by the Sargeant family in 1999. It stood in for St Anselm's Theological College in the BBC's miniseries adaptation of P. D. James' Death in Holy Orders in 2003.

== Architecture ==
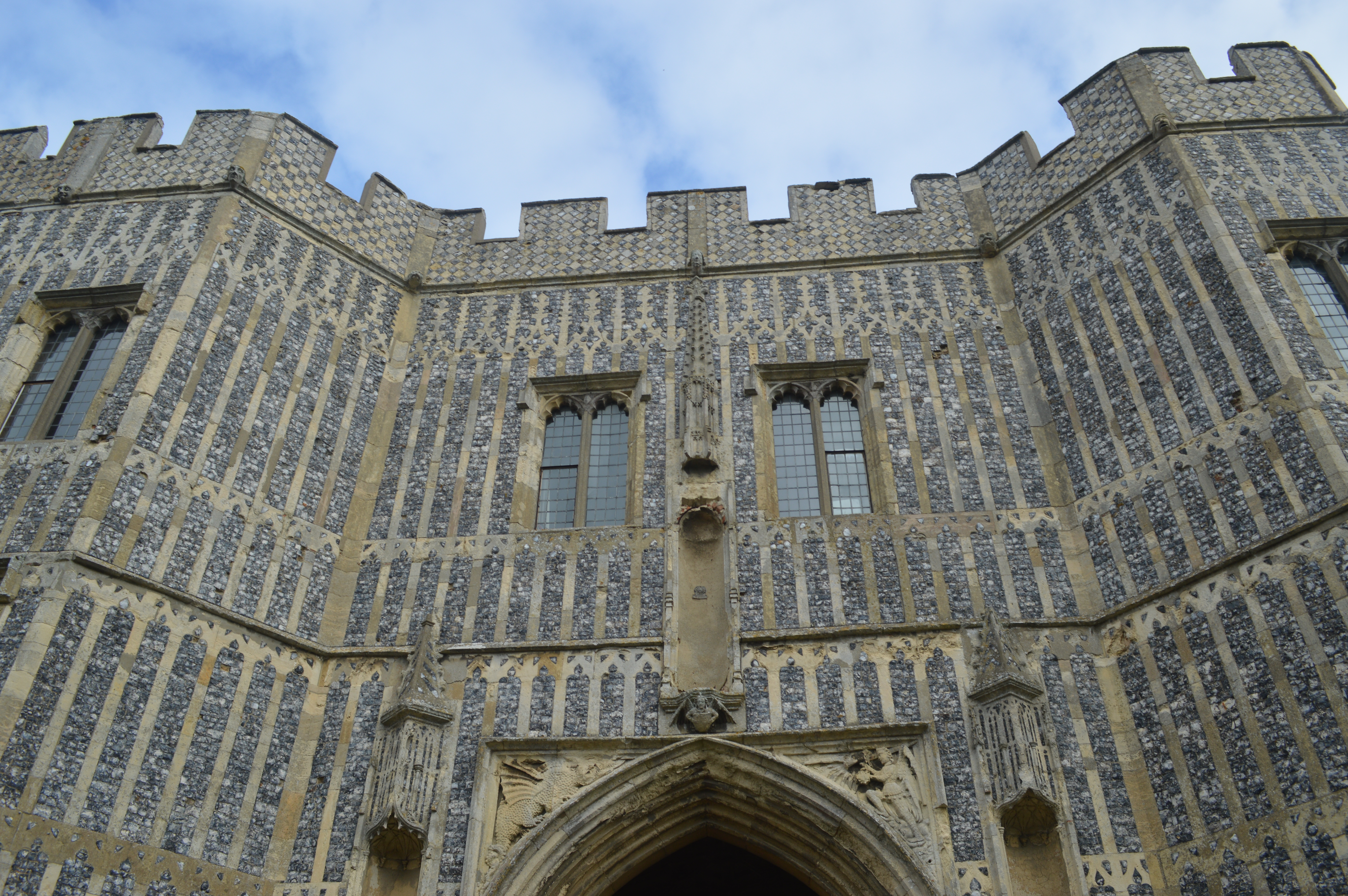
The upper part of the gatehouse

The gatehouse, dating from the late 15th century, is the most significant remnant of the original monastic structures still standing. The exterior is a fine example of decorative flint work. Five parts of the priory are Grade I listed buildings.

== Burials ==
- Richard de Belmeis I
- Adeliza de Clare de Vere, mother of Aubrey de Vere, 1st Earl of Oxford
- Lucy Young Rochford, wife of William Nassau de Zuylestein, 4th Earl of Rochford
