= Point Clear Martello Tower =

Martello tower in Essex

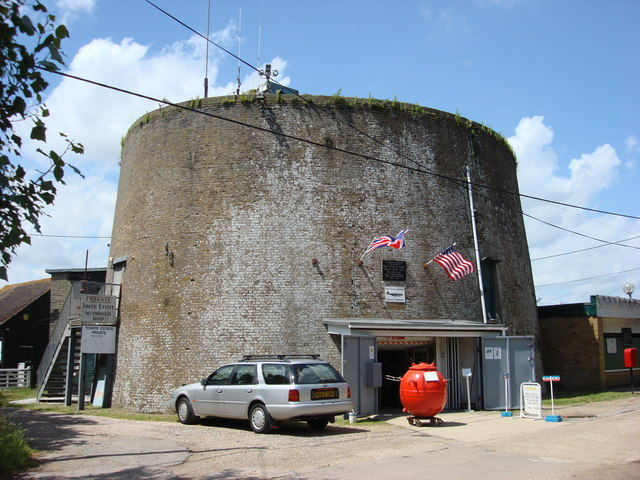
- Interactive map of the Point Clear Martello Tower area
- Alternative names: Martello Tower 'A'

General information
- Location: Point Clear, Essex, UK
- Coordinates: 51°48′04″N 1°01′11″E
- Year built: 1808–1810

Point Clear Martello Tower is a renovated Martello tower at Point Clear in Tendring, Essex, United Kingdom. It now functions as an aviation museum for aircraft from the Second World War. It is a Grade II listed building and a scheduled monument.

The tower's official designation is Martello Tower 'A'. It has also been referred to as 'St Osyth Martello Tower', though this name has also been applied to the now-demolished Martello Tower 'B' on Beacon Hill.

== History ==
=== Construction ===
The tower was one of several Martello towers on the east coast of England. They were constructed to defend the country against invasion by Napoleon Bonaparte and his armies. In total, 103 Martello towers were built between 1804 and 1812, 74 were built between 1804 and 1808 along the Kent and Sussex coast from Folkestone to Seaford, and 29 along the east coast between Point Clear near St Osyth and Aldeburgh from 1809 to 1812. The south coast towers were numbered 1–74 and the east coast towers were lettered A–Z. Three other east coast towers are known as AA, BB and CC. The tower at Point Clear is Tower A; it is both the earliest and most southerly of the towers on the east coast.

=== Napoleonic Wars ===
Point Clear Martello Tower was built to accompany a gun battery at Stone Point, 50 metres (160 ft) to the south-west of the tower.

As with all Martello towers on the Essex coast, Point Clear was armed and provisioned, but the soldiers did not live in the tower, and were instead based at Weeley barracks.

=== Later usage ===
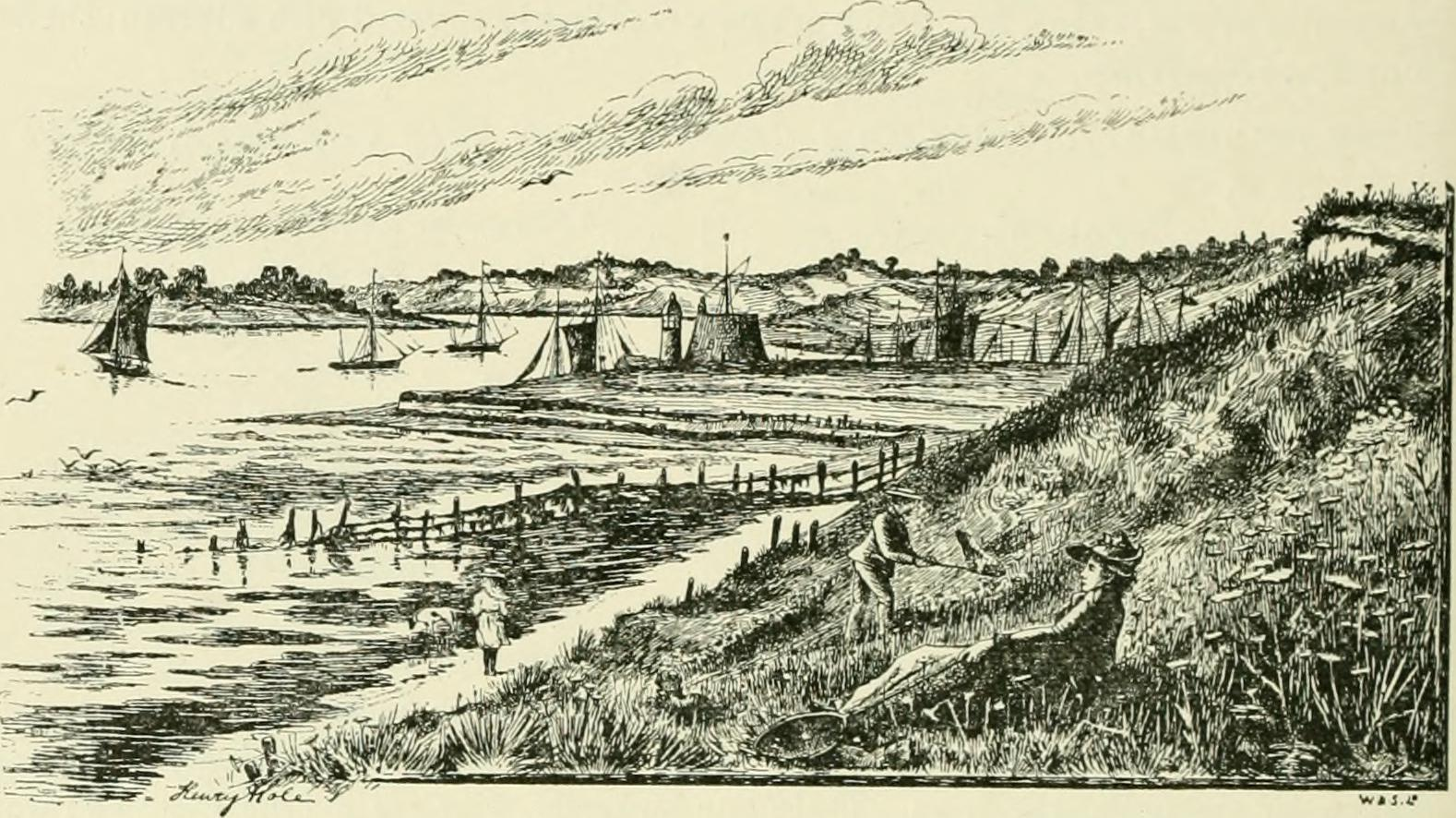
An 1887 illustration of Brightlingsea Harbour; Point Clear Martello Tower can be seen in the mid-ground

The Martello towers were brought to readiness on several occasions in the 19th century, but no invasions materialised. Advances in artillery technology eventually rendered the towers redundant for military purposes. Point Clear Martello Tower was repurposed as a coast guard station in the late 19th century, and as a picquet station during the First World War.

The Crown sold the tower after the First World War, and it was repurposed as a restaurant. During the Second World War the tower returned to military use as an observation post. Post-war, it was converted to a tea room, serving a nearby holiday park.

=== East Essex Aviation Museum ===
The East Essex Aviation Society, formed in 1985, has operated the East Essex Aviation Museum from Point Clear Martello Tower since 1986. The centrepiece of the museum's collection is the wreckage of a USAAF P-51 Mustang, 'Little Zippie.' The aircraft was lost to sea off the coast nearby in 1945 while returning to RAF Wattisham, and was recovered in 1987. The museum also houses the partial remains of another Mustang that crashed at nearby Frinton, and in 2009 paid for the pilot's daughter to visit the museum.

== See also ==
- Harwich Redoubt – another Napoleonic Wars-era coastal fortification in the region
- Jaywick Martello Tower (Martello Tower 'C') – another surviving Martello tower in the region

== Bibliography ==
- Clements, W. H. (1998). Towers of strength: the story of the Martello towers. Barnsley, South Yorkshire [England]: Leo Cooper. ISBN 978-0-85052-679-0.
