= St Osyth Witches =

1582 witchcraft trial in Essex, England

The St Osyth Witches were 14 women who were tried for witchcraft in Essex in 1582. A village near Brightlingsea in Essex, St Osyth was home to 14 women who were put on trial for witchcraft, some of whom were duly convicted according to law.

== Ursula Kemp ==
Ursula Kemp had a reputation of being able to undo curses that had been placed upon people by the means of witchcraft, this had led her to be one of the first accused of witchcraft by Grace Thurlowe.

Kemp’s case showed what happens when a woman does not conform to societal expectations due to the accusations made by Thurlow and Letherdale.

== Trial ==
Brian Darcy, Grace Thurlowe's employer, imprisoned Ursula and committed her for trial in February 1582 at the seasonal criminal court (assizes).

The testimony of Ursula Kemp's eight-year-old son helped to secure a conviction: partly because of her son's evidence and partly because of the court's promise to treat her with clemency, she confessed to the art of witchcraft, and in this confession (as was often the case) she implicated others that she knew.

The charges brought against Kemp ranged from preventing beer from brewing to causing a death through the means of sorcery, the punishment for which was execution. When the trial ended Kemp was executed by hanging along with Elizabeth Bennet, who was found guilty of murdering four people through witchcraft and confessed to having two familiars.

== See also ==
- Witch-hunt
- Witchcraft Acts
