= Jaywick Martello Tower =

Fort on east coast of England

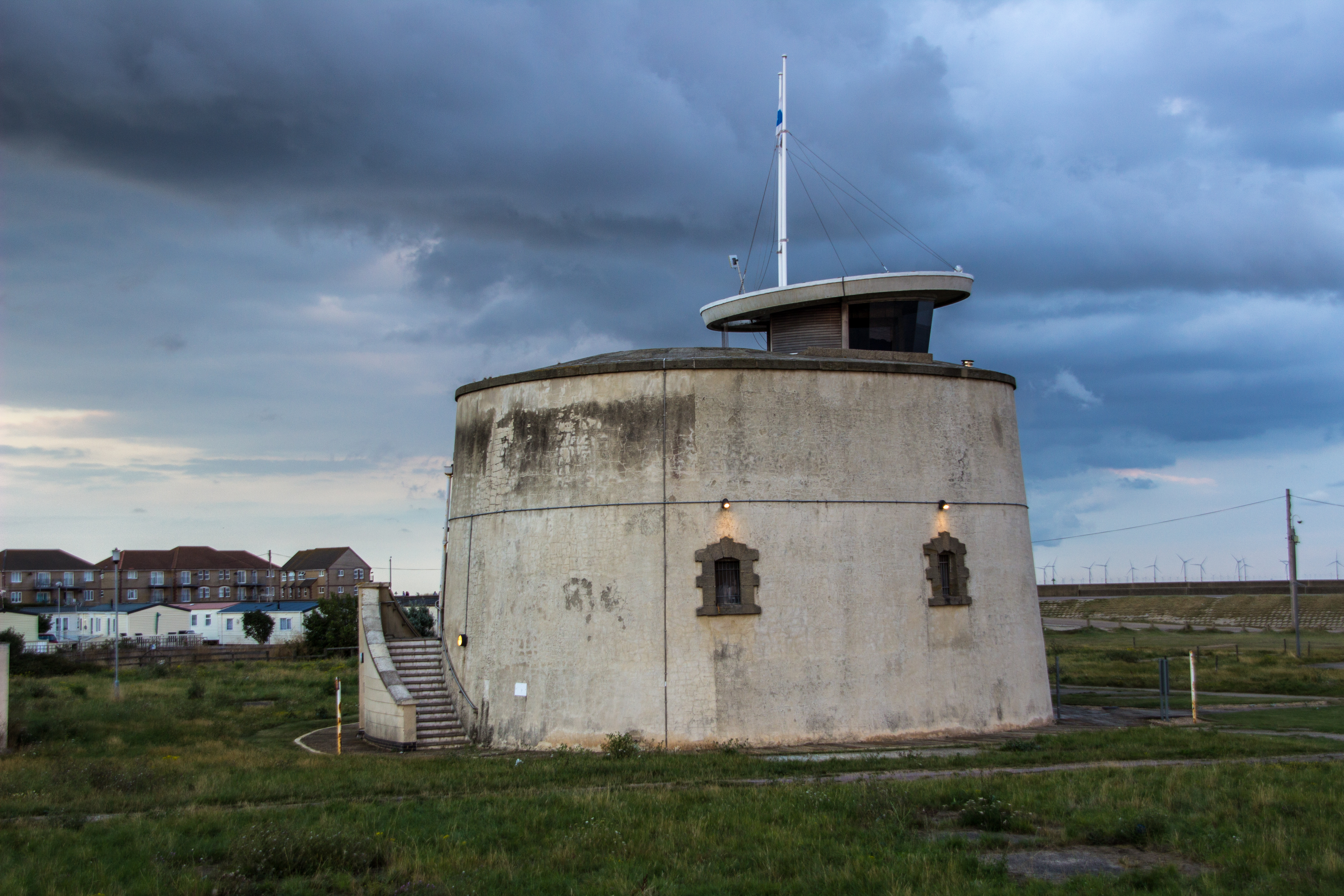
- Interactive map of the Jaywick Martello Tower area
- Alternative names: Martello Tower 'C'

General information
- Location: Jaywick, Essex
- Coordinates: 51°46′21.74″N 1°5′38.49″E
- Year built: 1808–1811

Jaywick Martello Tower is a renovated Martello tower at Jaywick, 2.7 miles (4.3 km) south-west of Clacton-on-Sea, Essex. It now functions as an arts, heritage and community venue. It is a Grade II listed building and a scheduled monument.

== History ==
=== Construction ===
The tower was one of several Martello towers on the east coast of England. They were constructed to defend the country against invasion by Napoleon Bonaparte and his armies. In total, 103 Martello towers were built between 1804 and 1812, 74 were built between 1804 and 1808 along the Kent and Sussex coast from Folkestone to Seaford, and 29 along the east coast between Point Clear near St Osyth and Aldeburgh from 1809 to 1812. The south coast towers were numbered 1 – 74 and the east coast towers were lettered A – Z. Three other east coast towers are known as AA, BB and CC. The tower at Jaywick is Tower C.

Construction of Jaywick Martello Tower began in August 1808, when the foundations were excavated. Work on the structure itself began in July 1809. The tower was constructed from around 750,000 London Clay bricks manufactured at Grays and transported by barge. The brick walls are 2–3 metres (6 ft 7 in – 9 ft 10 in) thick and around 10 metres (33 ft) high. The roof held three sea-facing cannon, usually one heavier gun flanked by two smaller howitzers. The tower at Jaywick retains the installations for the cannon. The brickwork was completed on 6 September 1810, however subsidence on one side saw work on the parapet suspended. Over the course of eighteen months the tower was levelled out, however this resulted in it sitting five feet lower than the other towers.

=== Napoleonic Wars ===
The tower was built to station up to 40 soldiers, but the Essex coast was considered unhealthy. As such, the garrison spent the Napoleonic Wars at the barracks in Weeley, eight miles away. Three privates and a sergeant were kept at the tower on lookout at all times.

The tower's basement was used as a storeroom, including a months' food supplies, stores of shot and gunpowder, and a water cistern. Living quarters were on the second floor, accessed via an external ladder. The gun platform on the roof was equipped with a 24-pounder cannon. A further three 24-pounders were kept on carriages outside of the tower itself.

=== Later usage ===
The Martello towers were brought to readiness on several occasions in the 19th century, but no invasions materialised. Advances in artillery technology eventually rendered the towers redundant for military purposes. In 1904, the tower was sold by the War Office and became part of a golf course.

The military returned to the tower in the First World War, when it was used by the Essex Cycle Battalion, and in the Second World War, when it was used by the Home Guard. Adaptations were made to the tower in 1940 to make it more suitable for use as an observation post, including the addition of two stairways, the blocking of the original stairway, and the addition of a reinforced concerete structure to the gun embrasure.

=== Arts venue ===
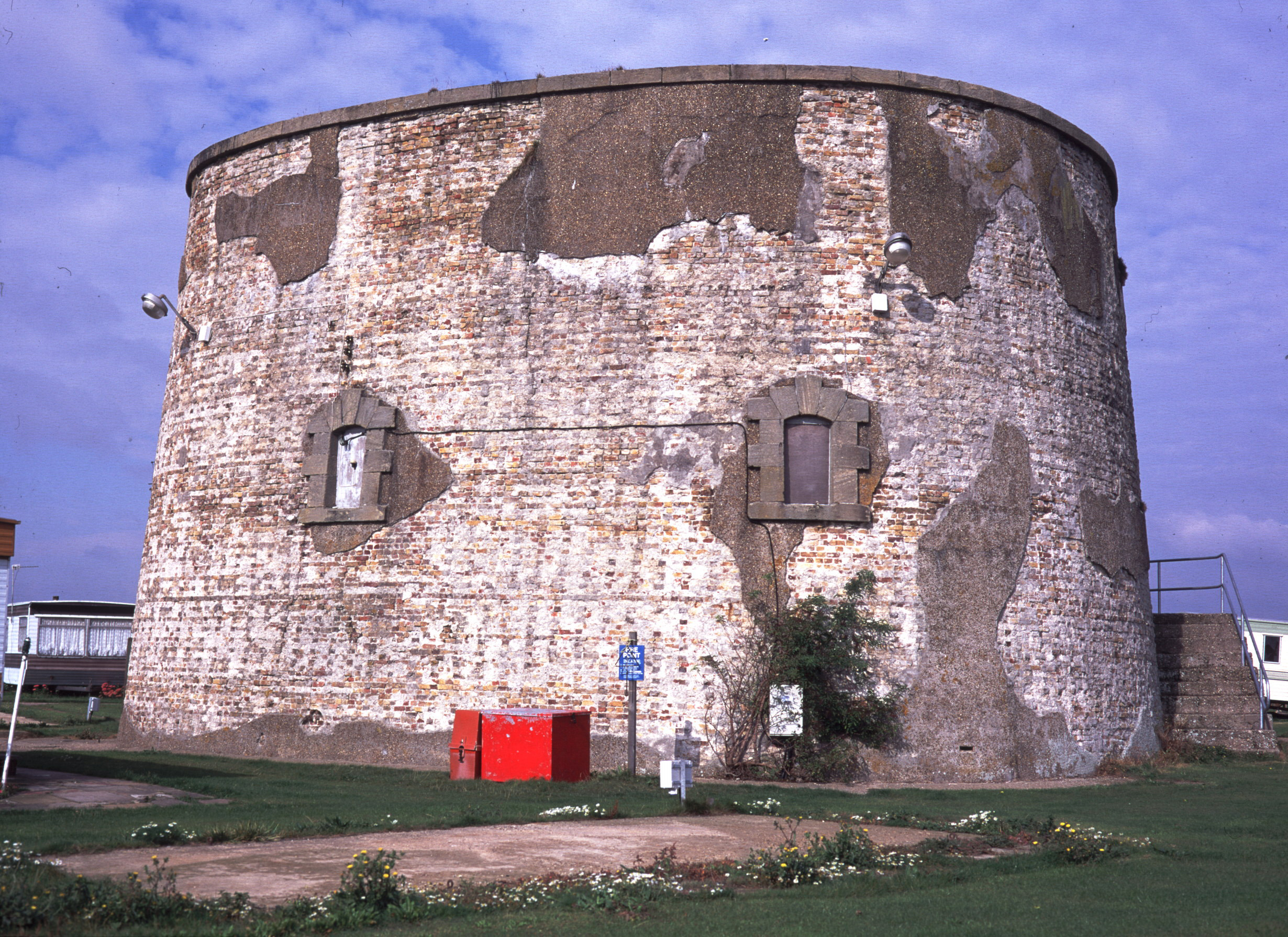
The tower in the 1990s, prior to renovations.

In 2005 the tower opened as a gallery space and arts venue managed by Essex County Council. It also provides a venue for a range of projects and events including community workshops, living history experiences, and live music. In 2011, a couple got married in the tower. In 2019, the tower hosted a meeting to discuss actions following Historic England reporting that several Martello Towers along this stretch of coast are in need of serious repairs.

In 2026, it was reported that Essex County Council were planning on closing the tower to save £90,000 per financial year. These plans were subsequently scrapped following consultation with local communities.

== See also ==
- Soft Ices, a Jaywick-based arts project
- Point Clear Martello Tower – another nearby Martello tower
