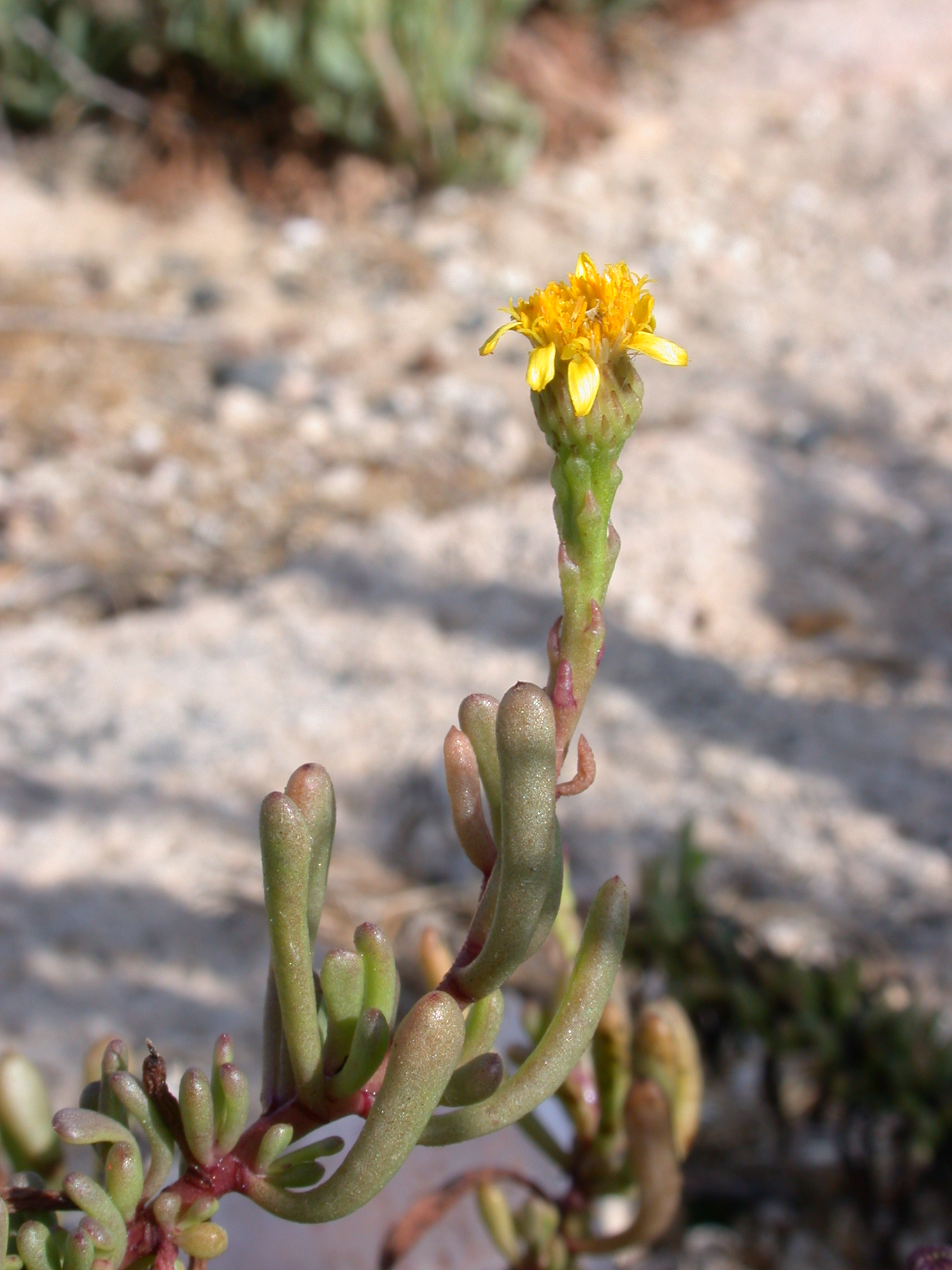
- Limbarda crithmoides

Scientific classification
- Kingdom: Plantae
- Clade: Tracheophytes
- Clade: Angiosperms
- Clade: Eudicots
- Clade: Asterids
- Order: Asterales
- Family: Asteraceae
- Subfamily: Asteroideae
- Tribe: Inuleae
- Genus: Limbarda; Adans.

Type species
- Limbarda crithmoides (L.) Dumort.

= Limbarda =

Genus of flowering plants

Limbarda is a genus of succulent, xerophytic plants in the daisy family.

Species

- Limbarda crithmoides (L.) Dumort. - (golden samphire) - Mediterranean Region and British Isles
- Limbarda salsoloides (Turcz.) Ikonn. - Mongolia

formerly included

Limbarda japonica (Thunb.) Raf. - Inula japonica Thunb.
