= Lee-over-Sands =

Hamlet in Essex, England

Coordinates: 51.7717°N 1.052°E

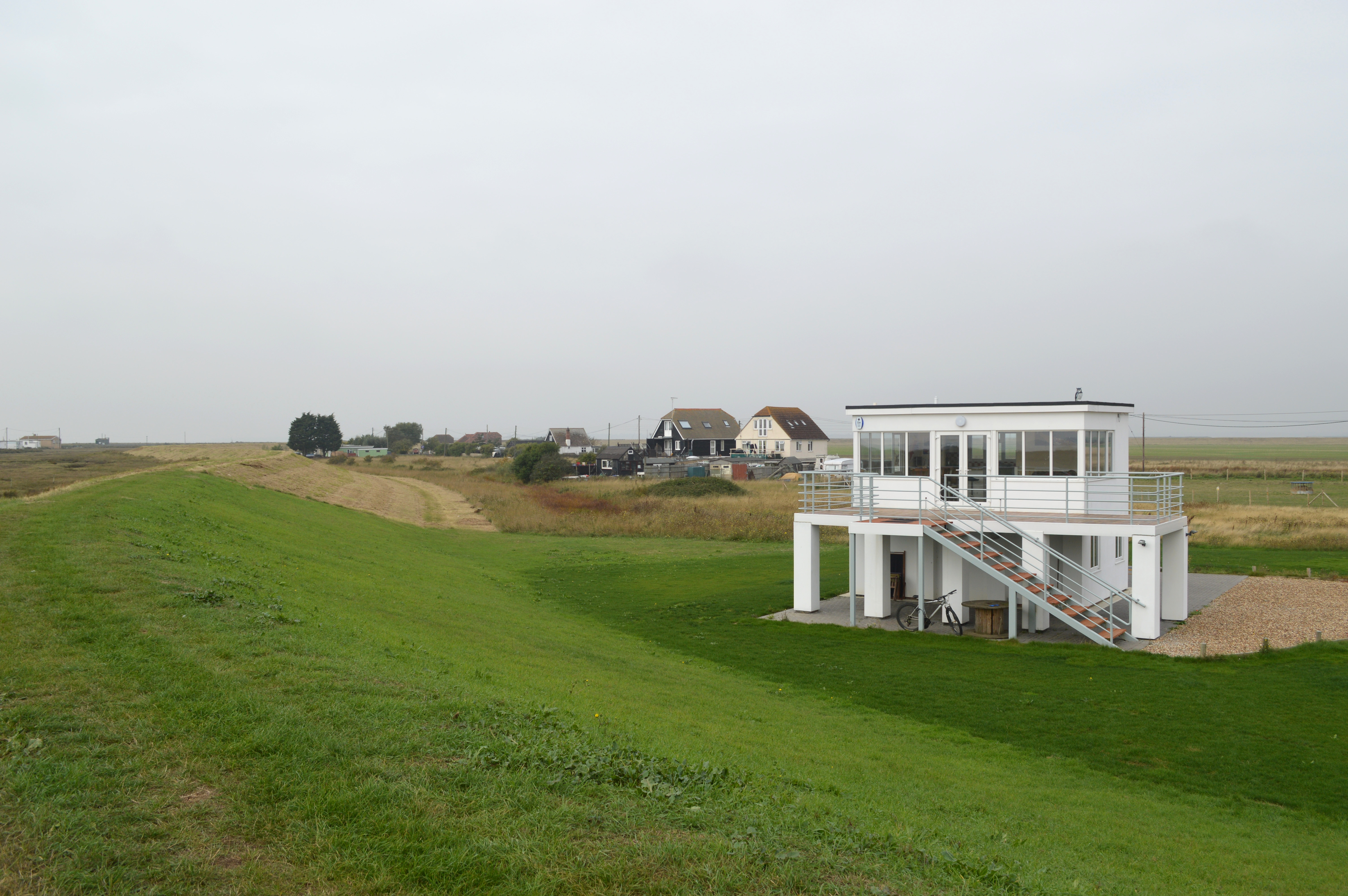
- Houses on Wall Street, except for the closest white house which is on Leewick Lane

- Location within Essex
- Civil parish: St Osyth
- District: Tendring
- Shire county: Essex
- Region: East
- Country: England
- Sovereign state: United Kingdom

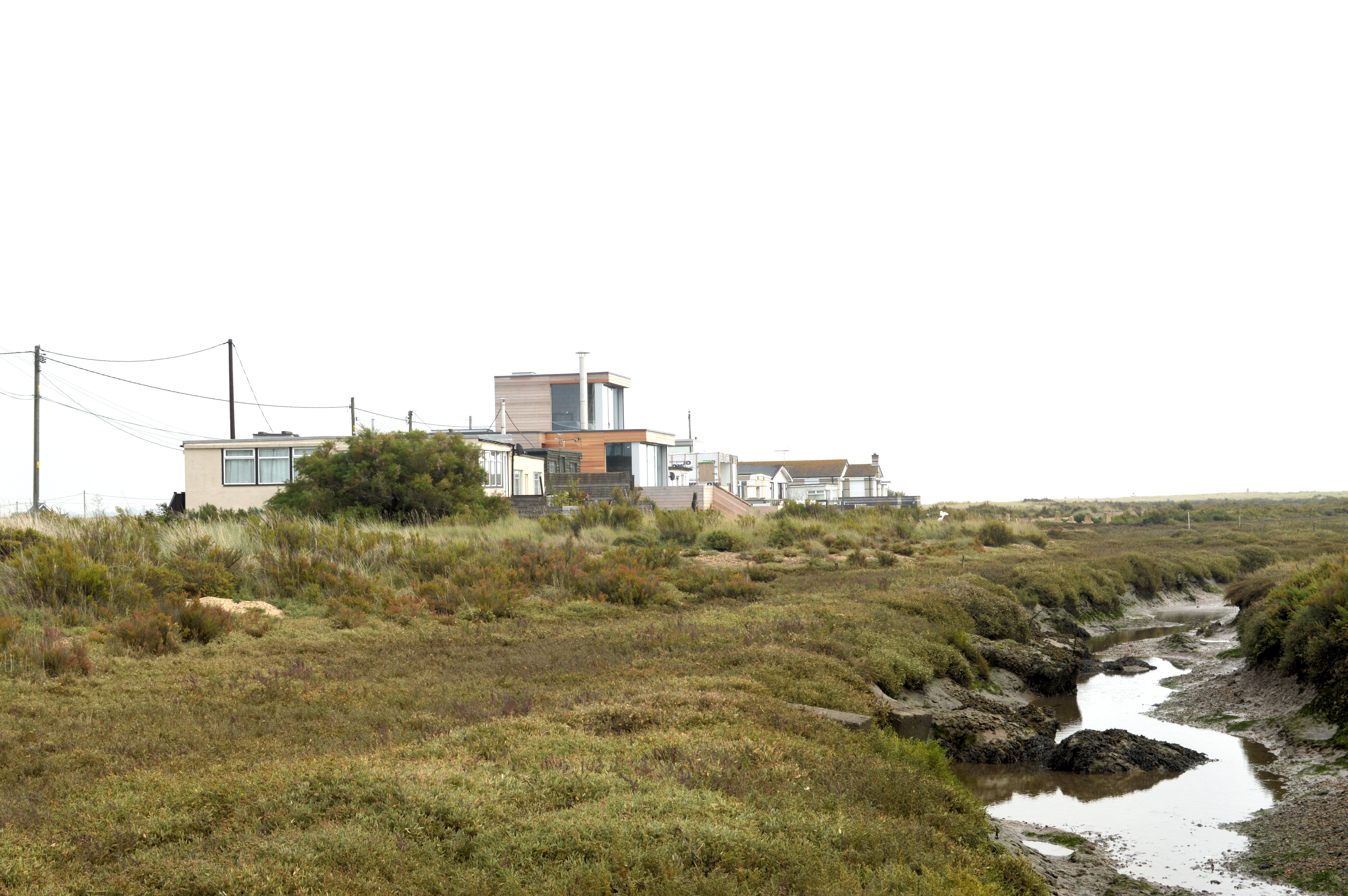
The seaward side of houses on Beach Road

Lee-over-Sands is a small coastal hamlet in the civil parish of St Osyth, in the Tendring district of Essex, England. It is located close to the mouth of the River Colne into the North Sea.

A sandspit called Colne Point is offshore from the hamlet. Colne Point Nature Reserve, a shingle ridge enclosing a saltmarsh, is to the west of the hamlet on the site of a World War I gravel works. Jaywick Martello Tower is 1.8 miles (2.9 km) east of Lee-over-Sands.

The area is subject to flooding, and was severely affected by the North Sea flood of 1953, when the seawall was breached in many locations near the village. Thirty-seven people died in nearby Jaywick, 3 miles (4.8 km) east of Lee-over-Sands. In January 2017 following a threat of coastal flooding, an evacuation of 2,500 homes in Lee-over-Sands and nearby Jaywick was planned, but in the event not required.

A number of houses are on the seaward side of the seawall, on Beach Road. One house on Beach Road won the RIBA East Award 2017 and the RIBA East Small Project Award 2017, and was long-listed for the national RIBA House of the Year award.
