= St Osyth =

English seaside resort

St Osyth: Toosie/Toosey
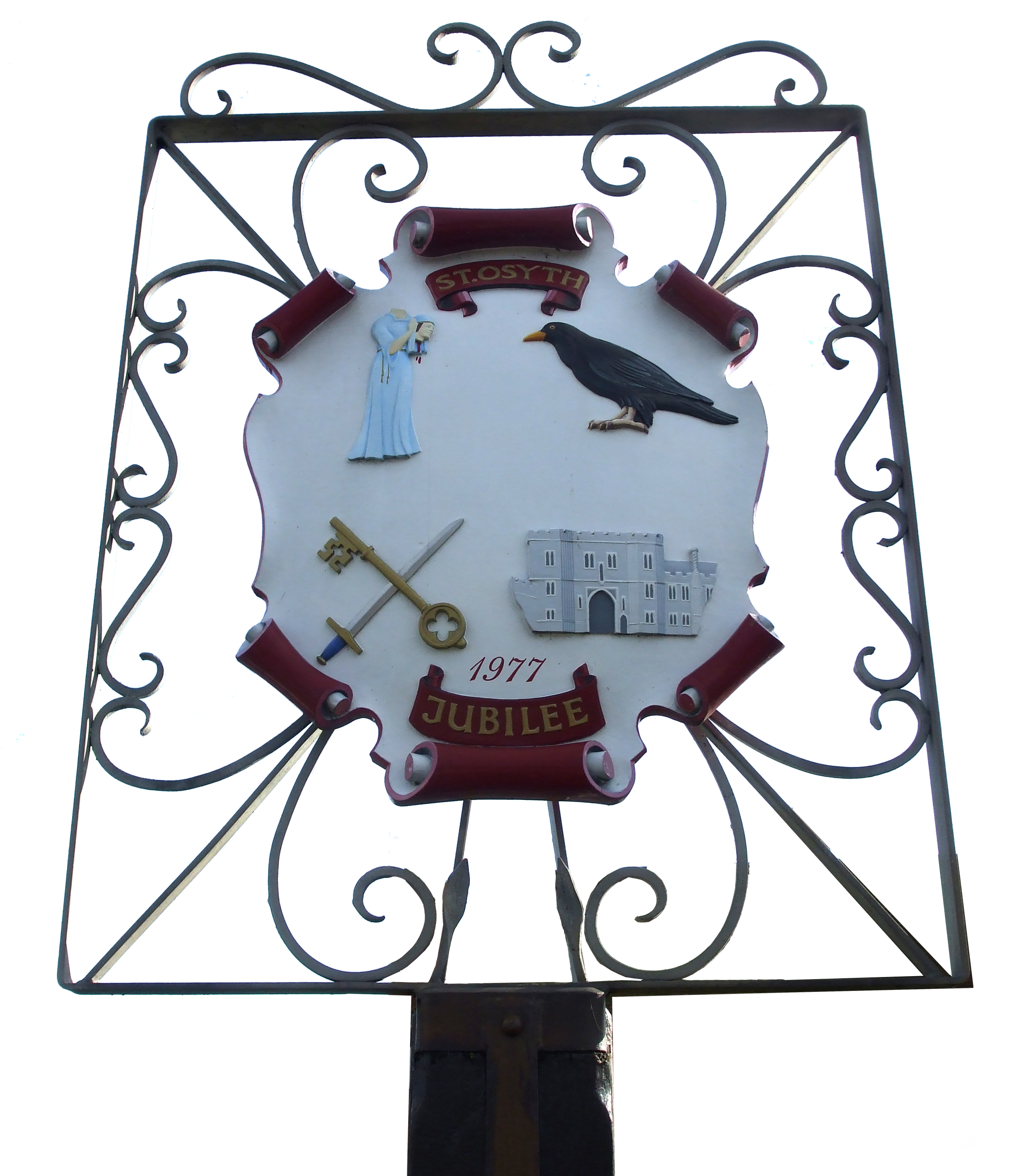
- Village sign

- Location within Essex
- Population: 5,157 (Parish, 2021)
- OS grid reference: TM123156
- District: Tendring
- Shire county: Essex
- Region: East
- Country: England
- Sovereign state: United Kingdom
- Post town: CLACTON-ON-SEA
- Postcode district: CO16
- Dialling code: 01255
- Police: Essex
- Fire: Essex
- Ambulance: East of England
- UK Parliament: Clacton

St Osyth is an English village and civil parish in the Tendring District of north-east Essex, about five miles (eight kilometres) west of Clacton-on-Sea and 12 miles (19 km) southeast of Colchester. It lies on the B1027, Colchester–Clacton road. The village is named after Osgyth, a seventh-century saint and princess. Locally, the name is sometimes pronounced "Toosey". It is claimed to be the driest recorded place in the United Kingdom. At the 2021 census the parish had a population of 5,157.

== History ==
Before being renamed after the Abbey of St Osgyth built there in the 12th century, the village was called Chich (also spelt Chiche or Chick), from an Old English word cic meaning "bend", a reference to St Osyth Creek. Under King Canute/Cnut (reigned 1018–1035), Chich was assumed as part of the royal demesne and granted to Earl Godwin. By him it was given to Christ Church, Canterbury. After the Norman Conquest in 1066 it was transferred to the See of London.

The village is the location of an important medieval abbey, St Osyth's Priory, named after Osgyth, a semi-legendary Saxon princess and martyr. The village was an important mediaeval pilgrimage centre, based on the cult of the saint, and was for a time very wealthy. It has an impressive parish church, St Peter and St Paul, which is a landmark building of the rediscovery of brick as a material in English architecture – its interior is almost entirely built of this material, but to a design resembling earlier stone-built churches.

Thomas Darcy, 1st Baron Darcy of Chiche (1506–1558) is buried in the parish church.

For other historic buildings in St Osyth, see Historic England Archive.

St Osyth village was created by Joseph Woolf, described as an evil overlord by Channel 4's Time Team programme, "Lost Centuries of St Osyth", (series 12 episode 9, first broadcast in February 2005). The programme sought to uncover the early origins of the village, which is now concentrated around the Priory, the surviving parts of which date from its establishment as an Augustinian ('Austin') monastery in the 12th century. But digging in the churchyard of St Peter and St Paul close to The Bury – the old marketplace – in the current village centre found no evidence of much settlement there before the 14th century, whereas fieldwalking and digging revealed a mass of earlier material along the north bank of St Osyth Creek, about one-half mile (one kilometre) south. The earlier name of the village (Chich – see above) always suggested this might be the case - information the programme failed to give. The programme found evidence that a massive high tide in the 1600s might have ended industrial activity in the original village site along the creek.

The village was a focus for the St Osyth witch persecutions in the 16th and 17th centuries. Fourteen women were tried and ten local women were hanged. In 1921 the skeletons of two women, one in chains, were discovered in the garden of a house in the village. One was claimed to be the witch Ursley Kempe, who was the first to be prosecuted. The skeletons became a local tourist attraction. In the Napoleonic Wars two Martello Towers were built on the peninsula between the Colne Estuary and Brightlingsea Creek. One, Martello Tower 'A', survives at Stone Point and is now the East Essex Aviation Museum.

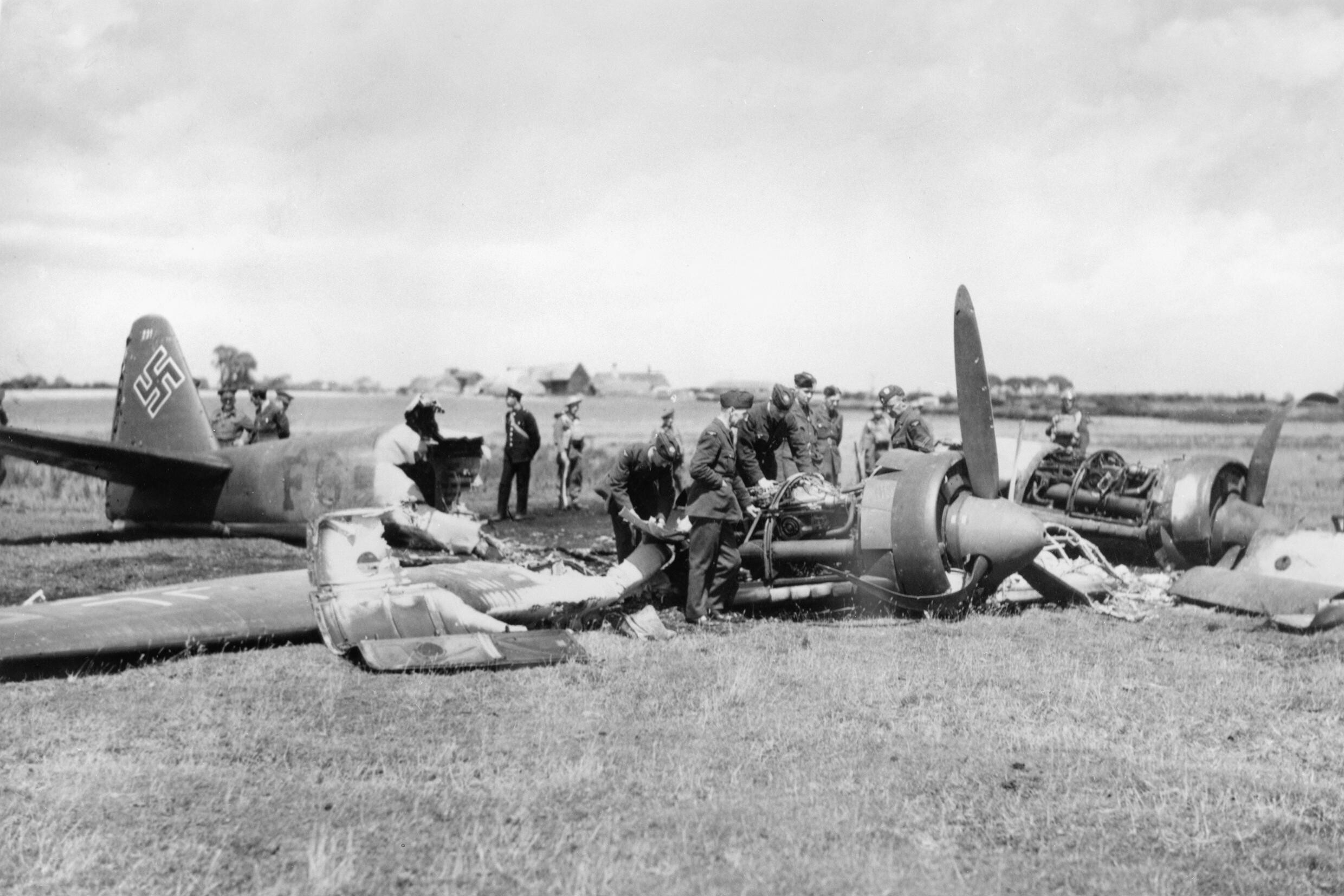
Burnt-out wreckage of a Junkers Ju 88 reconnaissance aircraft of 4.(F)/122 on Cockett Wick Farm; the aircraft was shot down on 20 July 1940 by No. 56 Squadron Hurricanes

The peninsula was cordoned off and used by the Navy and Army in both world wars. Between 1942 and 1944 it was a landing-craft training base called HMS Helder. No 1 Martello Tower was a signal station and minefield control point, linked to the Navy at Brightlingsea.

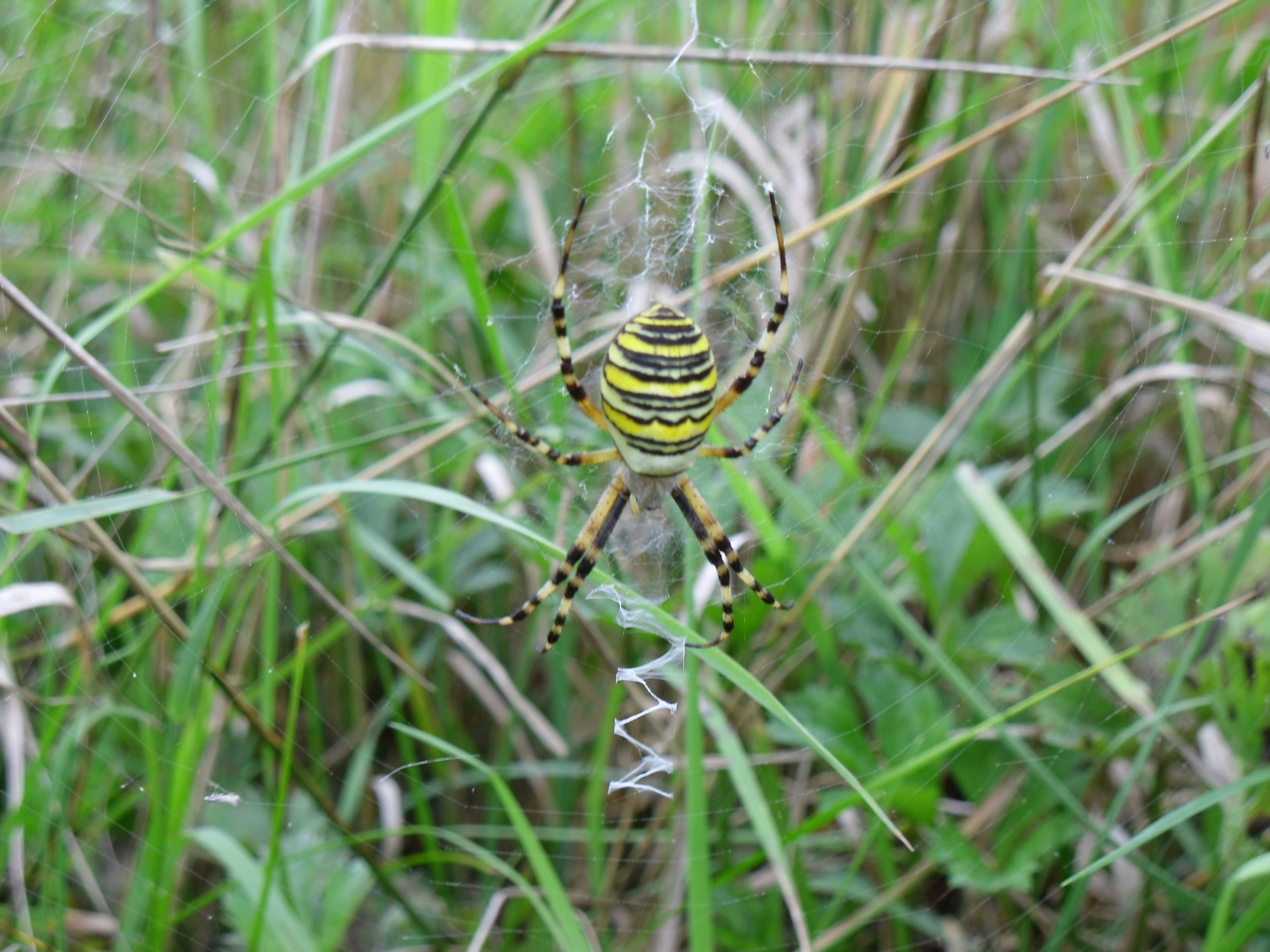
Wasp spider photographed on Howlands Marsh, St Osyth on Aug 29, 2011

== Geography ==
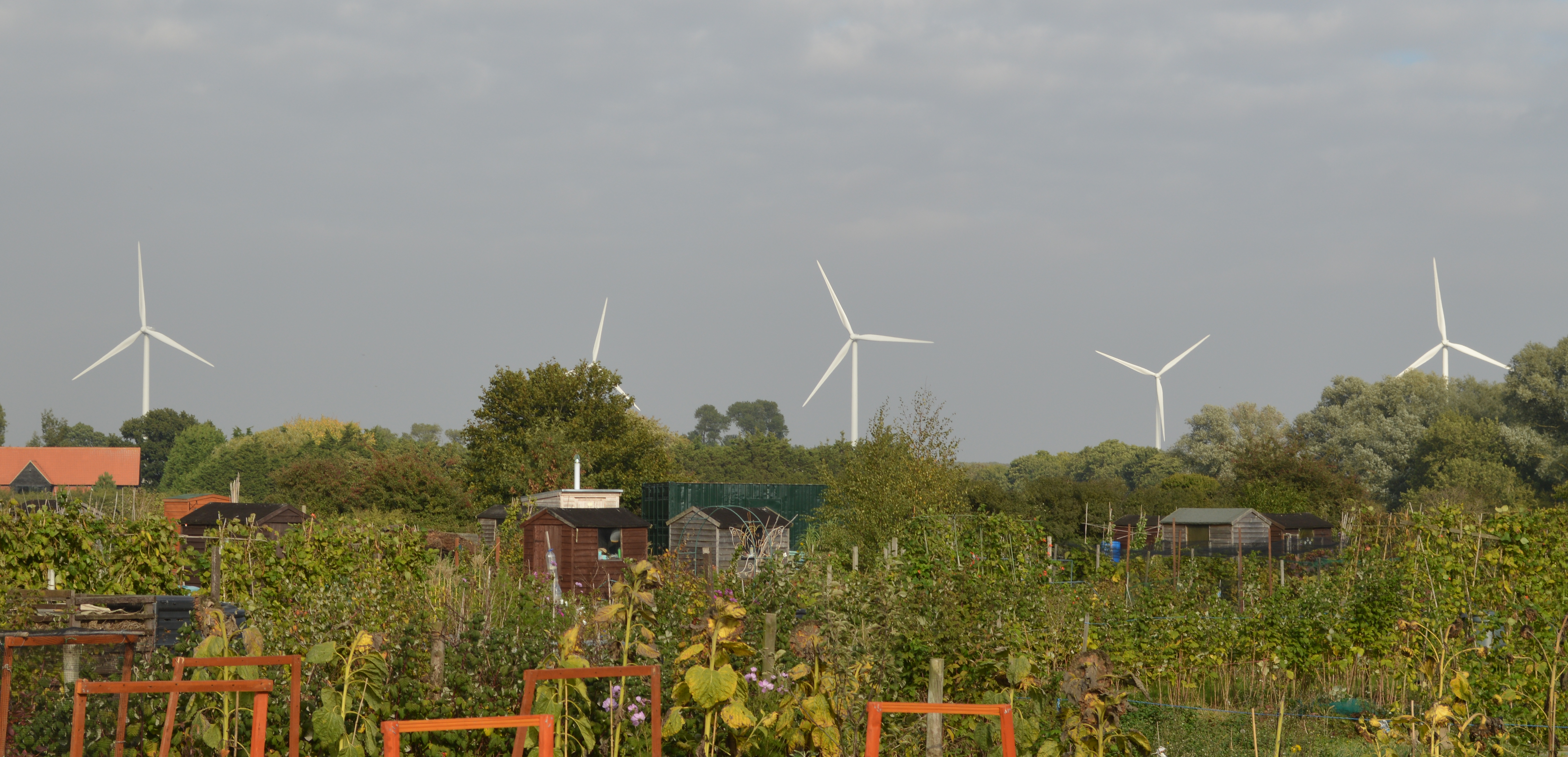
Earls Hall Farm Wind Farm, from St Osyth allotments on the east of the village. The wind farm consists of five turbines with a total nominal power of 10.25 MW.

St Osyth is claimed to be the driest recorded place in the United Kingdom, with an average annual rainfall of just 507 mm (20 inches).

The modern village lies on the coastward edge of the clay plateau which forms much of the topography of North East Essex, at an altitude of about 20 metres above mean sea level, but extends down towards the tidal St Osyth Creek. It overlooks extensive areas of rough pasture to the south and east - former marshes drained and reclaimed from the 17th century onward, which typically lie only one or two metres above mean sea level (some patches are below, especially near Jaywick). To the north-east the land was formerly heathland, and in common with much or the area around Colchester has been extensively quarried for sand and gravel.

St Osyth parish extends south from the village to the coast and includes the smaller villages of Point Clear and Lee-over-Sands. Although much of the parish boundary is coastline, which does not need to be "beaten," St Osyth is one parish that keeps up the tradition of beating the bounds on Rogation days. The Parish is one of the largest (in area) in Essex and extends inland almost to the village of Weeley four miles (six kilometres) northeast.

Between the Park of the Priory and Flag Creek (of which St Osyth Creek is a tributary) lies The Howlands, an extensive area of rough pasture managed as a Nature Reserve by the Essex Wildlife Trust. This is accessible to the public via a footpath along the creek from Mill Dam, and via another from the B1027. Two birdwatching hides are accessible to the public, one overlooking the rough grassland and the other on the sea-wall with views of Flag Creek. The seawall has been deliberately breached in order to create a shallow lagoon. Avocet, Golden Plover, Shelduck, Short-eared Owl, Marsh Harrier and Brent Geese are all found there, along with the invasive Wasp Spider (Argiope bruennichi). Adders (vipera berus) are also common.

=== Landmarks ===
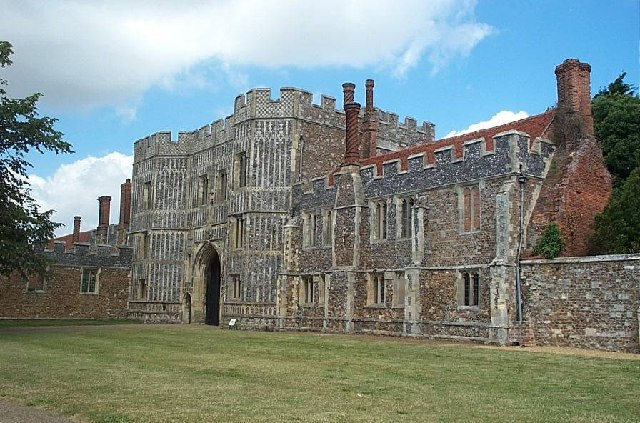
St Osyth's Priory Gatehouse

The most famous feature of the village is St Osyth's Priory, a group of Grade I and II listed buildings. The prime ones are the late 14th-century gatehouse (see photo) decorated in flint flushwork, and the Abbot's Tower of about 1527.

The Abbey became home to the Earls of Rochford, after King William III created the title for William Nassau de Zuylestein in 1695.

St Osyth's Priory held a herd of polled White Park cattle until an outbreak of foot-and-mouth disease in 1951, which led to their slaughter. A contemporary account states:

At St Osyth Priory, where an outbreak occurred last week, there was one of the few remaining herds of White Park cattle, one of the oldest breeds in this country. That has now been slaughtered, together with the small dairy herd and the stock of pigs. The farm is attached to the convalescent home maintained at the Priory by the Shepherds Friendly Society.

The land within the Priory boundaries is shown as a Deer Park on the Ordnance Survey map. The Priory is currently a private residence, not open to the public. Attempts by the owner to develop the park have resulted in controversy and a sustained campaign by a local group, Save Our St Osyth (S.O.S.). The owner, a property developer, has argued that the Priory buildings are in dire need of repair and development is required to finance this.

The Priory grounds contain the site of a Roman villa, marked on the Ordnance Survey map TM1216. The site of the contemporary wharf serving the villa has been identified on Howlands Marsh. A Roman road led from near Elmstead Market to the vicinity of the current St Osyth burial ground on Clay Lane.

A wooden tide mill stood at the north end of the dam which now crosses St Osyth Creek and the 'Mill Pond' or Mill Dam Lake; it was demolished in 1962 but the sluice which powered the mill still operates as Mill Dam Lake is filled and emptied tidally from St Osyth Creek. The lake is used for water-skiing.

A commercial boatyard operates on St Osyth Creek. It is the home port of the Thames sailing barge Edme, formerly of the Edme Maltings at Mistley, a frequent competitor, and often victor, in the annual Thames Barge racing series.

A plaque on The Bury (as the green in front of the Priory is called) commemorates the achievement of Trevor Osben, who circumnavigated the globe in a self-built sloop.

The village church is dedicated to Saints Peter and Paul. The Martello tower at Point Clear has been converted into a war museum. Just south of the village lies St Clere's Hall, a fine example of a 13th-century aisled hall (not open to the public).

=== St Osyth Beach ===
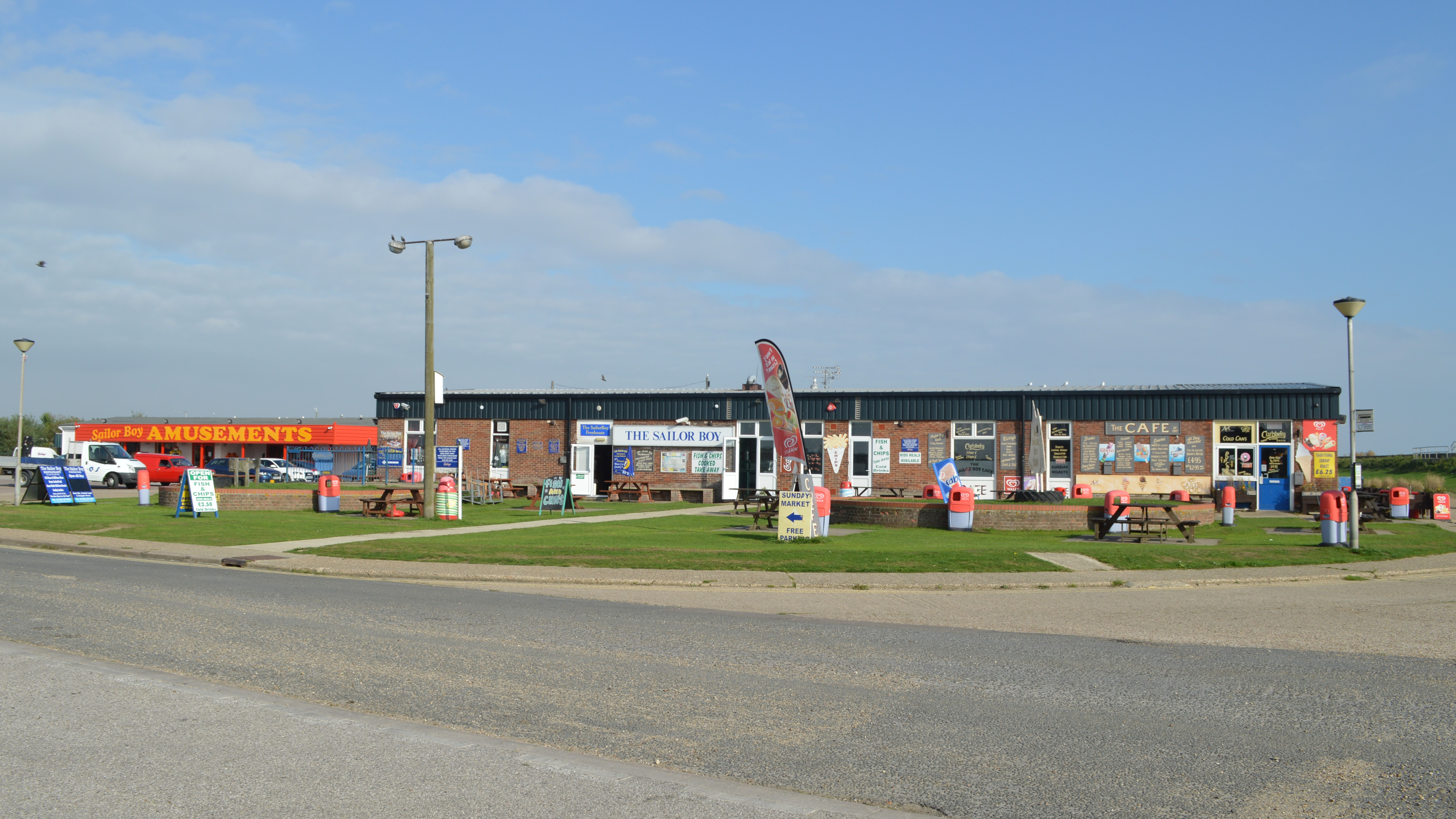
Café and amusements between Hutleys caravan park and the beach in Seawick

The neighbouring settlement of St Osyth Beach contains Essex's largest concentration of static caravan parking, including Seawick, St Osyth Beach (owned by Park Holidays UK) and Hutleys. These boost the local population in the summer by an estimated 7,000. Some of the beach is used for nude bathing. (Note: The naturist beach is located at 51°46′13″N 1°04′04″E, access to the beach is from 51°46′21″N 1°05′14″E)

St Osyth Beach and adjoining Jaywick were the scene of fatalities during "The Great Flood" of 1953.

The tiny settlement of Lee-over-Sands, adjacent to Colne Point Nature Reserve with access from Lee Wick Lane, is a remnant of a failed 1930s attempt to build a golfing resort. Lying mostly along the seaward side of the coastal defences, it consists mainly of small chalet dwellings built on stilts to protect them against high tides. It has recently become celebrated for some unusual beach-house architecture.

== Entertainment ==
The St Osyth Social Club in Church Square is home to three league darts teams: St Osyth Social, The Priorymen and SOSC Ladies.

== Notable people ==
In order of birth:

- William de Corbeil (c. 1070–1136), appointed Archbishop of Canterbury in 1123, had previously been Prior at Chich (St Osyth Abbey).
- Ursula Kemp (c. 1525–1582), midwife, was tried and hanged for witchcraft along with several others
- William Nassau de Zuylestein, 1st Earl of Rochford (1649–1708), Anglo-Dutch soldier and diplomat
- William Nassau de Zuylestein, 4th Earl of Rochford (1717–1781), diplomat and statesman
- Benjamin Golding (1793–1863), founder of Charing Cross Hospital
- Somerset de Chair (1911–1995), soldier, author, art collector and politician, owned St Osyth's Priory from 1954 until his death.
