= Jaywick =

Coastal village in Essex, England

Coordinates: 51.7795°N 1.1174°E

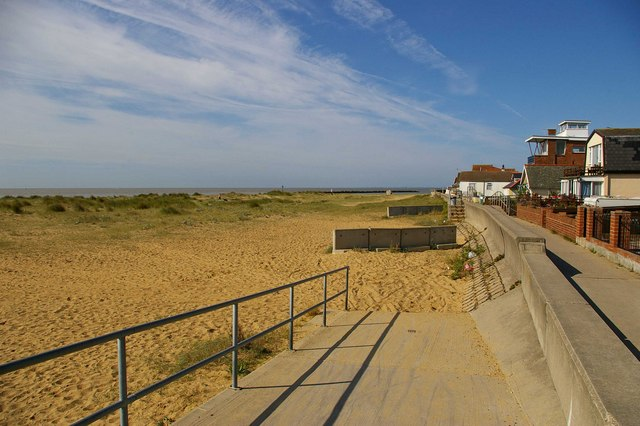
- Jaywick Sands

- Location within Essex
- Population: 4,665
- OS grid reference: TM151135
- District: Tendring
- Shire county: Essex
- Region: East
- Country: England
- Sovereign state: United Kingdom
- Post town: CLACTON-ON-SEA
- Postcode district: CO15
- Dialling code: 01255
- Police: Essex
- Fire: Essex
- Ambulance: East of England
- UK Parliament: Clacton

Jaywick is a coastal village in the Tendring district of Essex, England, 2 miles (3 km) west of Clacton-on-Sea. It lies on the North Sea coast of England, 60 miles (97 km) from London and 17 miles (27 km) from Colchester. It was constructed in the 1930s as a holiday resort for Londoners but has, over time, been officially named the most deprived area in the country.

The land on which the village is built was originally fields and salt marsh unsuitable for agriculture. It was purchased by the entrepreneur Frank Stedman in 1928 to build low cost, affordable holiday homes for working-class families, and became a popular holiday destination throughout the 1930s. After the Second World War, a shortage of housing meant the properties became permanently inhabited despite not being built for this purpose. Many holiday homes are now in a state of disrepair, and the local community have resisted demolition. Jaywick has significant problems with unemployment and is at risk of flooding, despite several attempts by the local council to transform the area.

== Location ==
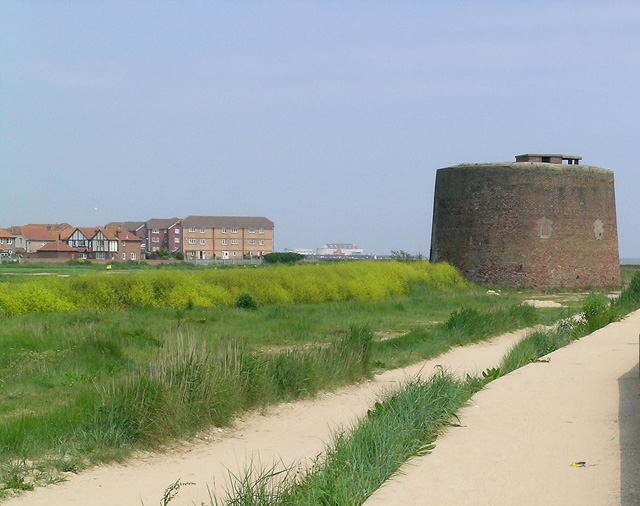
The Martello Tower, now an arts centre

Jaywick is around 60 miles (100 kilometres) from London and 17 miles (27 km) southeast of Colchester. It is in the Golf Green ward of the Tendring district of north-east Essex. To the north-east is Clacton-on-Sea (from which it is separated by Clacton Airport), while to the west is the estuary of the River Colne. Jaywick is divided into the Tudor estate to the north (also known as West Clacton), the Village to the southeast and the Brooklands and Grasslands estates to the southwest.

Most shops are on the village's main street, Broadway. A 200-year-old Martello tower on the coastline was converted into an arts and heritage centre. The artwork, "46 Brooklands Gardens", by Nathan Coley was erected at the Martello tower as a three-month show piece.

== History ==
What is now Jaywick was originally fields and salt marshes near Clacton and St Osyth. The Clacton Spear, a wooden spear from the Lower Paleolithic era, found locally in an area of foreshore erosion, is the oldest known man-made wooden artefact found in the British Isles. The name Jaywick is first documented in 1438 and apparently means "farm frequented by jays"; the earliest recorded form, Clakyngeywyk, includes the adjective clacking, meaning "chattering". During the 19th century, the area was popular for shooting and contained a rifle range.

Because of its proximity to the sea, Jaywick had never been a practical place for farming due to the risk from floods and the land remained unused. A sea wall was built in 1880 to protect against flooding. Ordnance Survey mapping around 1897 shows Jaywick as a few farmhouses near what is now Crossways on the Tudor estate.

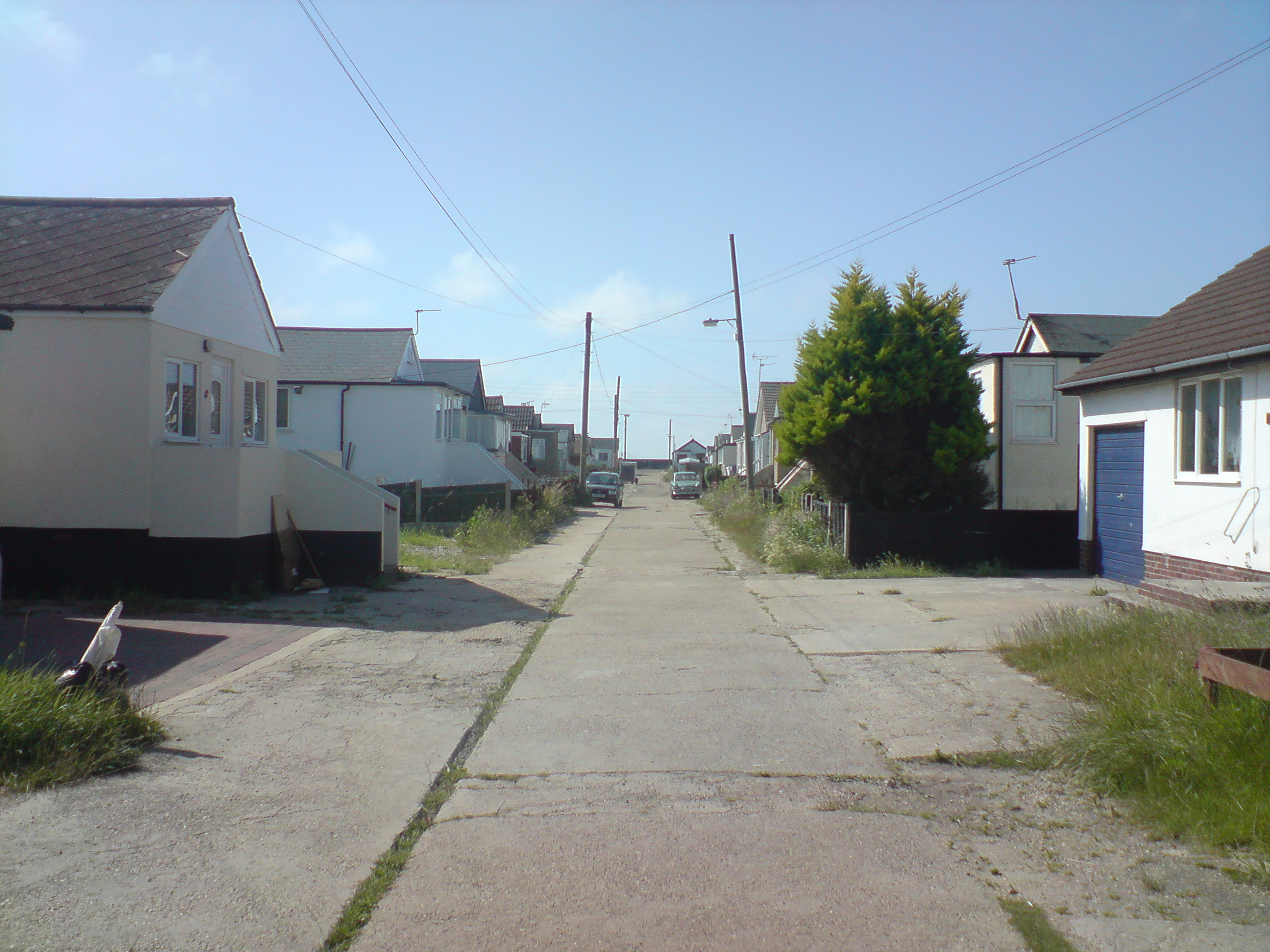
A typical street in Jaywick in 2009

By the turn of the 20th century, campaigners such as William Morris had attempted to convince people of the virtues of self-sufficient communities for poor families away from large cities, which led to developments such as Peacehaven in Sussex in 1914. Jaywick was proposed by property developer Frank Stedman in 1928 as a cheap holiday retreat for Londoners. Stedman had noticed the popularity of Clacton as a holiday resort and believed that he could sell small plots of land to East End residents on which holiday homes could be built. Residents were encouraged to buy land and self-build properties, with plots being offered as little as £25 (equivalent to £1,400 in 2025) and Stedman convinced buyers that a house could be built for as little as £395 (equivalent to £21,500 in 2025). An initial emphasis was on well-being, health and fitness, with outdoor exercises being popular. Stedman was motivated primarily by money rather than altruism and while he discussed plans for landscaping the development, along with a lake and a sports centre, they never materialised.

The original estate was developed in the shape of a car radiator grille and the roads were named after vehicle manufacturers. Coaches regularly picked up holidaymakers throughout the 1930s from Ilford and Romford. The Jaywick Miniature Railway, an 18-inch (460 mm) gauge miniature railway operated from 1936 to 1939. The locomotive was a model of a GNR Stirling 4-2-2.

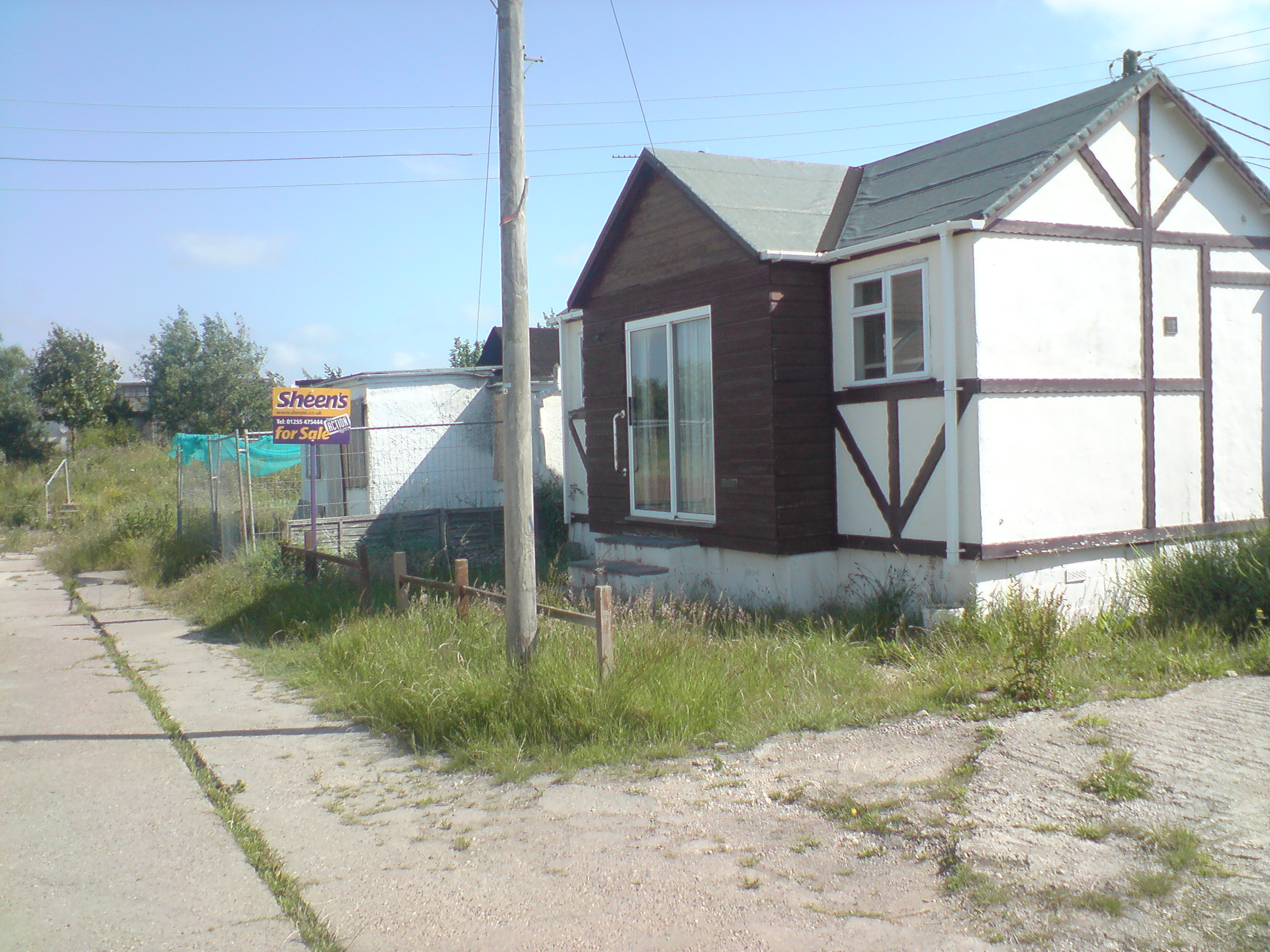
An abandoned house in Jaywick in 2009

Plotland developments elsewhere in Britain were bulldozed after the Second World War. Attempts were made by the local council to demolish Jaywick, but there was resistance from residents who campaigned against it and won a preservation order in 1970. The council were unhappy about a housing development sitting on such a flood-prone site and modern conveniences were slow in arriving. A mains sewer system was only installed in 1977.

In 1978, the local council issued an "Article 4 direction" to control housing development so that planning permission is required for home improvements that would not usually be needed elsewhere, including all extensions, porches and garden structures. The direction was further revised in 2010.

In the 1990s, forty prefabricated houses were built on an adjacent former holiday camp site to rehouse residents of some of the most dilapidated properties. Despite it winning several architectural awards and being praised by the local council, only five of the older properties were demolished. The original development along Brooklands has faced demolition, particularly with respect to dilapidated properties. Vacant sites nearby have been purchased to provide new homes. New permanent residences in Brooklands are prohibited by council regulations. Tendring District Council hope that by 2026, the area will change sufficiently to be attractive for development, and to provide a self-sufficient service based economy for tourism.

In 2018 Tendring district council engaged Colchester-based architects HAT Projects who designed Sunspot (named after an earlier structure, an amusement arcade), a £4.8M development designed to provide offices, workshops, a cafe, training areas and a market hall. In October 2023 23 out of its 24 units had been rented out to small businesses.

== Social issues ==
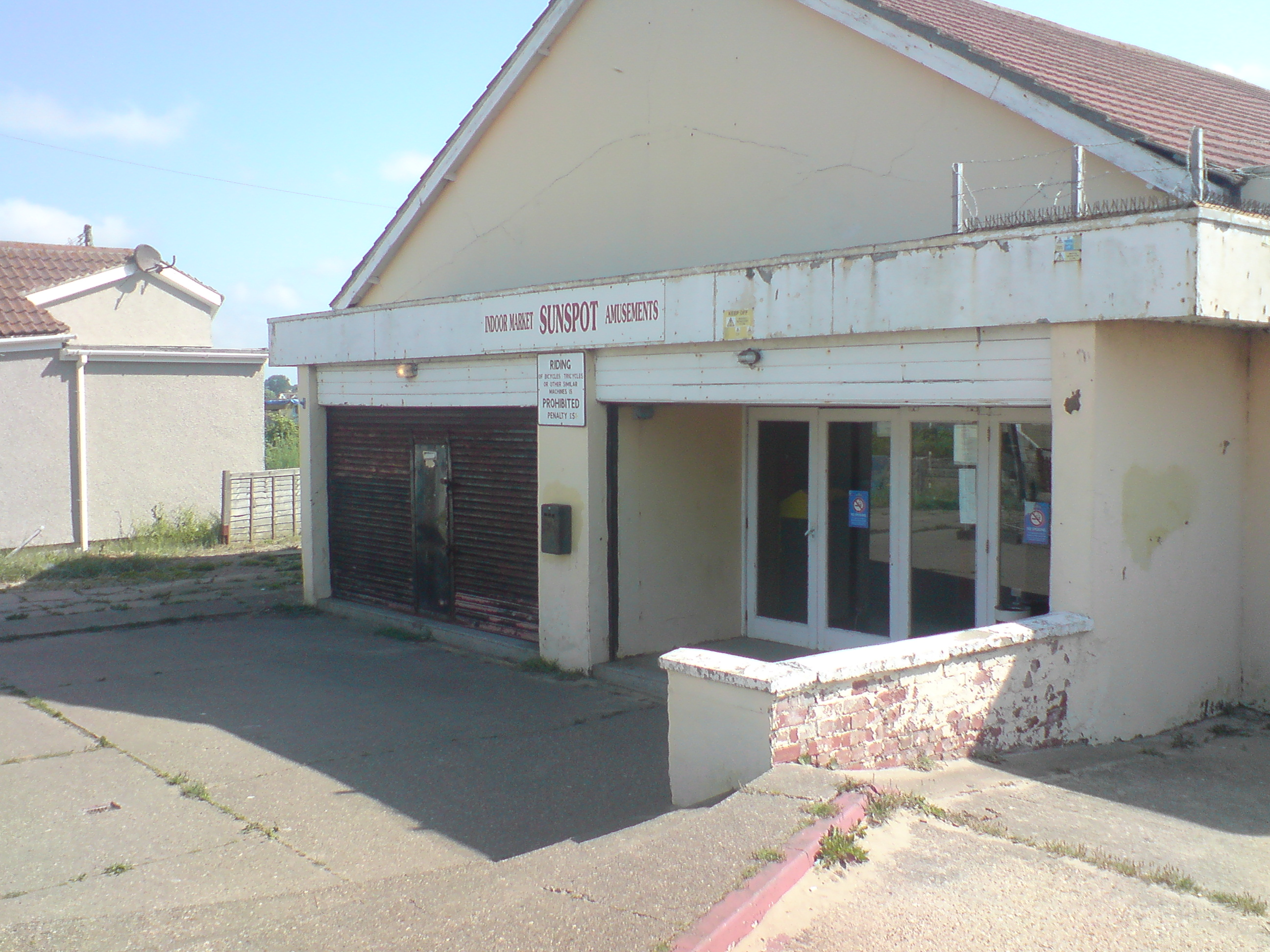
An amusement arcade in Jaywick in 2009

Despite being marketed as holiday homes, many of the original houses became permanent residences due to post-war housing shortages in London, and by 1950 there was a significant year-round population. Jaywick now includes large numbers of retired and unemployed people. A 2011 report in The Guardian found that 62% of working age residents in Jaywick received benefits, compared to a national average of 15%. A subsequent report in 2015 reiterated the area was one of the most deprived English neighbourhoods. According to the Index of Multiple Deprivation of both 2010 and 2015, the western half of the village is the most deprived area of England. According to the Citizens Advice Bureau, 40% of residents are unable to work due to a disability or long-term illness. 60% of pupils at Frobisher Primary School, on the edge of the village, receive free school meals.

A 2009 report found that four out of Eastern England's ten cheapest streets in which to buy property are in Jaywick, with property on Tamarisk Way selling for an average of £44,050. A 2013 report in The Guardian showed that bungalows were being sold on the Brooklands estate for around £20,000.

In 2010, Jaywick was assessed as the most deprived area in England. In September 2015, it was again named as the most deprived, according to the indices of deprivation based on several factors including: poverty, crime, education and skill levels, unemployment and housing, after being assessed in 2012–13. Referring to the older estates in Jaywick, the headmistress of Frobisher Primary School said "When you go to certain parts of it, you are quite shocked that you are in England." In 2012, Jaywick was labelled the UK's youth unemployment hotspot. Randeep Ramesh, writing in The Guardian, noted that there has been little employment available since the Butlins holiday camp closed in 1983. Local charity Signpost has helped young people find employment, which has become difficult due to many jobs being a significant distance away in Colchester or Ipswich. Tightening of building regulations has meant that simple builders jobs for cash are now illegal without appropriate health and safety training. Drug abuse is a particular problem in the area. Because of the area's reputation for economic deprivation, private developers are unwilling to invest there.

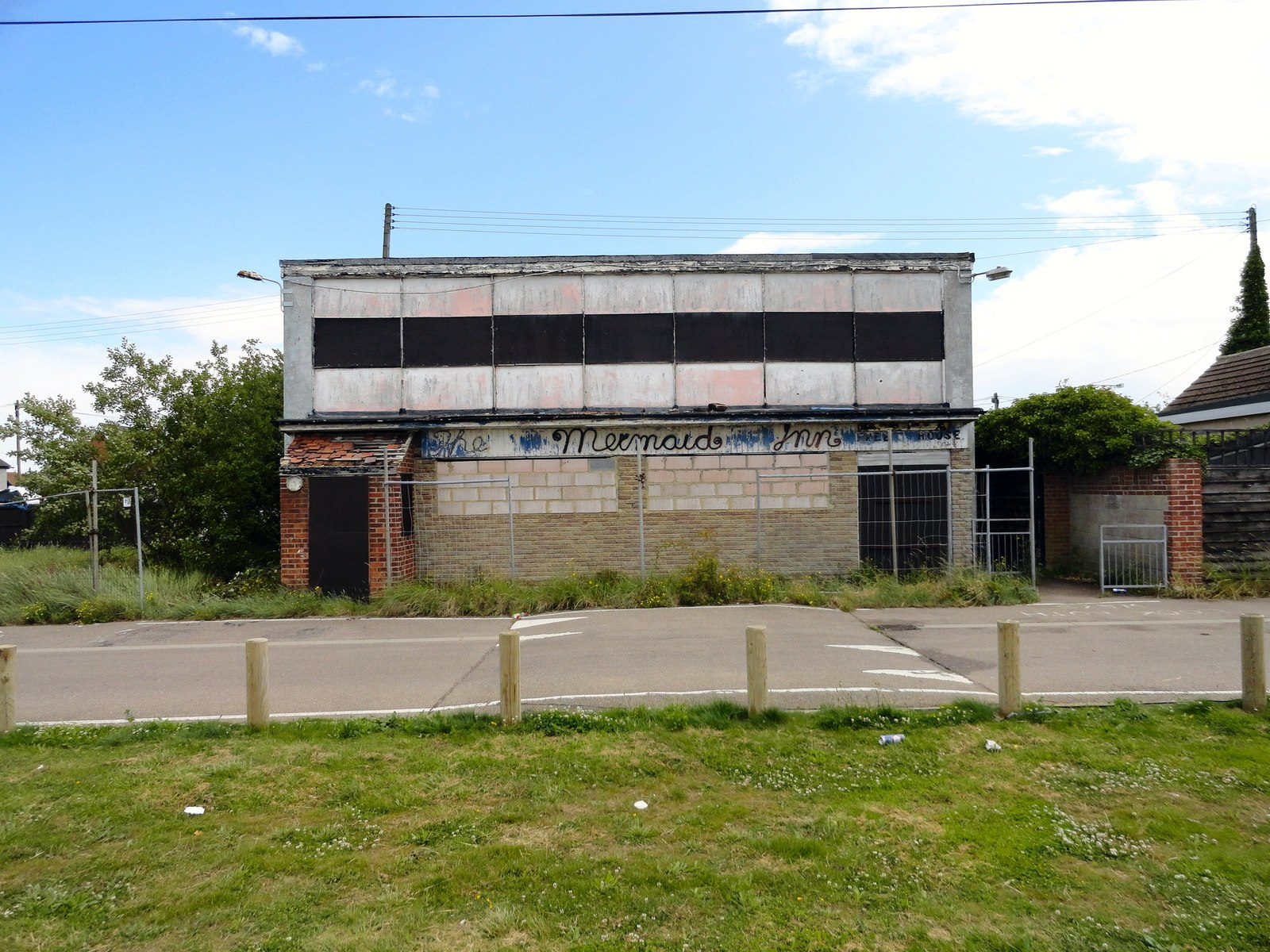
The former Mermaid Inn in Brooklands Avenue in 2011, which was left derelict after a fire

The local controlling council, Tendring District Council, are working with the residents of Brooklands on improving the area and trying to buy up land to build new housing. Council leader Mick Page stated "The only way we will start anything in Jaywick is for us to lead it. We will be the catalyst." The council proposed to stop the allocation of housing benefit to rented properties in Jaywick by 2017, to discourage rental in poor quality buildings. Former council leader Neil Stock has called Jaywick "an embarrassment to the whole country", blaming planning regulations he believes are draconian. Stock reported around 30 to 40 absentee landlords were renting poor quality accommodation to tenants on benefits without requiring any deposit, adding that "the state is subsidising squalor."

In 2011, the council complained to then-Prime Minister David Cameron, asking him to lobby the Committee for the 2012 London Olympics to ensure the Olympic torch passed near Jaywick, the only one of the ten most deprived wards in England it would not pass close to.

The Jaywick Community Resource Centre sits on a former boating lake in Brooklands, and provides support to local residents. In 2010, two filmmakers compiled a documentary, Jaywick Escapes, which showed life in the village. The film combined archive footage from the estate's early years alongside recent interviews with recovering heroin addicts living in Jaywick. It was shown at the 2012 East End Film Festival and an extract was subsequently shown at the Science Museum. In 2015, "Jaywick – Benefits by the Sea" aired on Channel 5. The programme looked at residents of the dilapidated town and their lifestyles. It included a sixty-year-old man who claimed he had not been sober since he was fifteen. A few residents of the Tudor Estate, outside the main deprived areas, complained and asked the Royal Mail to remove the name Jaywick from their postal address.

An image of the village was used in an attack ad by Republican congressional candidate Nick Stella (Illinois) during the 2018 United States midterm elections. The advert subsequently received angry criticism from residents and Tendring District Council Cabinet Member Paul Honeywood, saying "I know that many Jaywick Sands residents will be outraged at being smeared in this way, and rightly so." Stella has since apologised and a spokesperson for the Stella campaign said "our intent was never to make fun of the town".

== Environmental risk ==
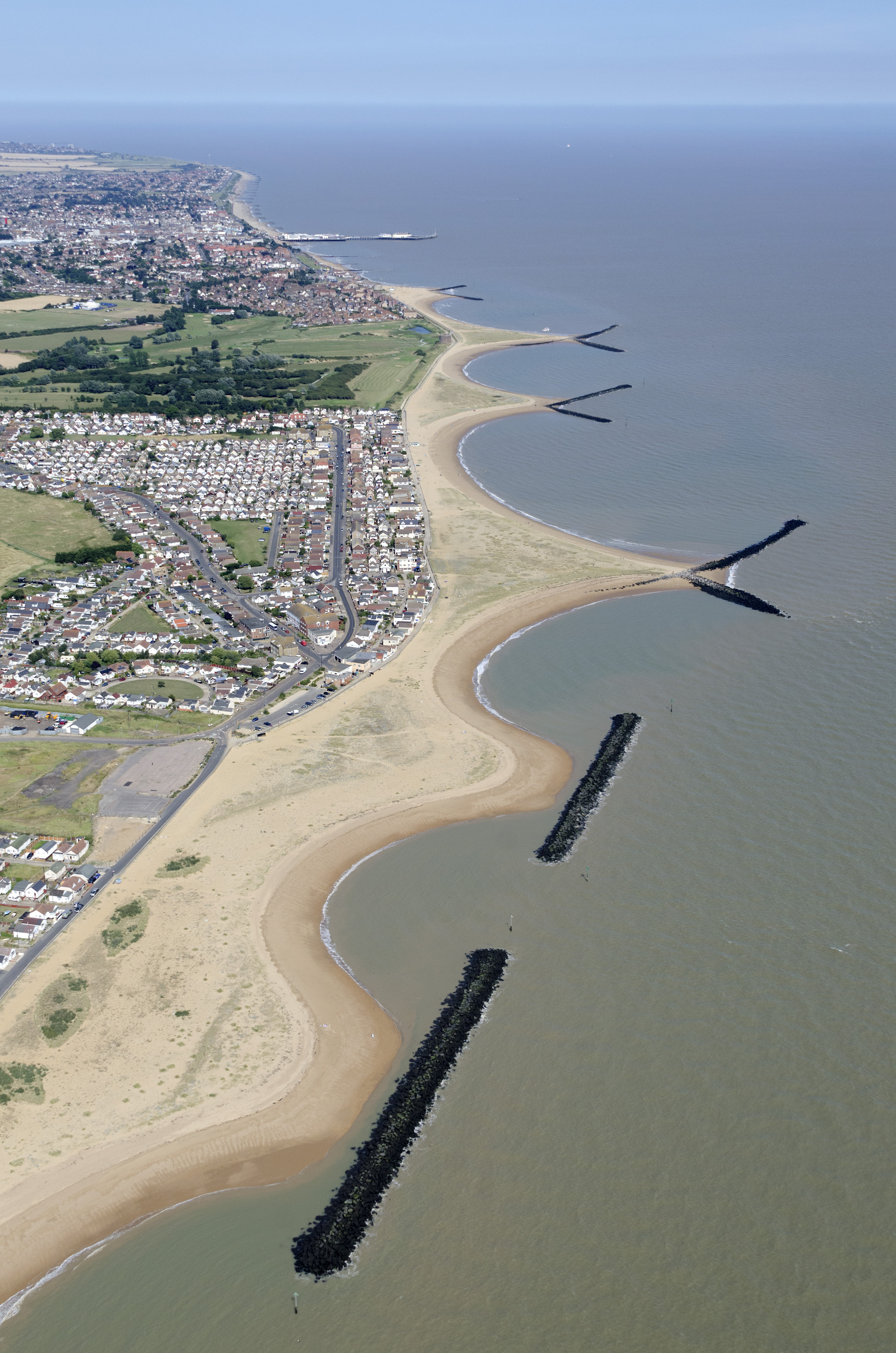
Aerial view showing sea defences

During the North Sea flood of 1953, Jaywick was flooded, resulting in the deaths of 35 people. Since then, sea defences have been put in place and many precautions have been made to avoid flooding. Coastal Jaywick has benefited from 30,000 cubic metres (40,000 cu. yd.) of dredged sand as part of a £9.4m upgrade. The residential areas are categorised as having the highest risk of flooding in the country, and a council report anticipated that global warming would increase the risk to human life in Jaywick from flooding over the next 50 to 75 years. The area would be the first to be hit by floods in the event of a tidal surge over the marshes surrounding St Osyth.

The main road into the village is close to sea level and there is the potential risk that a flood could cut off access for emergency services. Many roads, particularly around Brooklands, are unadopted without any public funding, hindering emergency access and giving the area a "run down" look. Because properties are sited on marshland, road improvements tend to have a short lifespan and are quickly damaged in bad weather. In December 2013, due to a severe flood risk, all residents in Jaywick were asked by Essex Police to temporarily leave the area, to be rehoused temporarily in school buildings around Clacton. A similar exercise happened in January 2017 following a threat of coastal flooding, involving the potential evacuation of 2,500 homes in Jaywick and nearby Lee-over-Sands.

== Use in media ==
The 2006 film Starter for 10's scenes set on the seafront were filmed in Jaywick. A scene in Brexit: The Uncivil War was set in a housing estate in Jaywick.
