= Jaywick Miniature Railway =

Narrow gauge railway in the UK

The Jaywick Miniature Railway was a 18 in (457 mm) narrow gauge railway running along the seafront of the Essex coastline, connecting Clacton on Sea to the recently opened holiday resort of Jaywick. It opened in July 1936 and closed in September 1939 following the outbreak of World War II. After the war three coaches were sold to the New Brighton Miniature Railway. The latter closed in 1965, and the coaches were then transferred to the Ravenglass and Eskdale Railway. The vertical boiler steam locomotive survives, in much rebuilt form, preserved by the Ashover Light Railway Society at Rowsley South.
