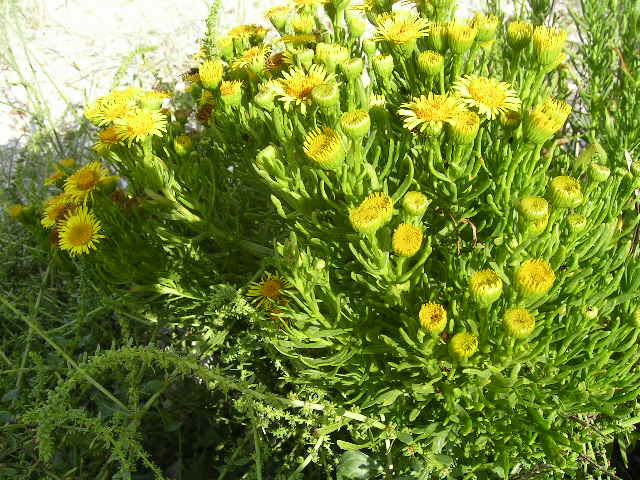

Scientific classification
- Kingdom: Plantae
- Clade: Tracheophytes
- Clade: Angiosperms
- Clade: Eudicots
- Clade: Asterids
- Order: Asterales
- Family: Asteraceae
- Genus: Limbarda
- Species: L. crithmoides

Binomial name
- Limbarda crithmoides (L.) Dumort.

Synonyms
- Eritheis maritima Gray; Inula crithmoides L.; Jacobaea crithmoides (L.) Merino; Inula acutifolia Pasq., syn of subsp. longifolia

= Golden samphire =

Species of flowering plant

The golden samphire (Limbarda crithmoides) is a perennial coastal species, which may be found growing on salt marsh or sea cliffs across western and southern Europe and the Mediterranean.

Golden samphire has a tufted habit, and the plant may grow up to 1 m tall. It has narrow fleshy green to yellow green leaves and large flower heads, with six yellow ray florets which may be up to 1.5–2.5 cm (1–1 in) across. The flowers are self-fertile (able to pollinate themselves) and may also be pollinated by bees, flies and beetles. They bloom between June and October and can smell like shoe polish.

== Taxonomy ==
It was first described by Carl Linnaeus as Inula crithmoides in his book Species Plantarum 2 on page 883 in 1753 and then later when the genus was renamed, it was published as Limbarda crithmoides by Barthélemy Charles Joseph Dumortier in Fl. Belg. on page 68 in 1827.

It was verified by United States Department of Agriculture and the Agricultural Research Service on 11 June 2015.

Known subspecies:

- Limbarda crithmoides subsp. crithmoides
- Limbarda crithmoides subsp. longifolia (Arcang.) Greuter

== Distribution and habitat ==
It is native to temperate parts of Africa, Asia and Europe.

=== Range ===
It is found in Africa, within Algeria, Egypt (incl. Sinai), Libya, Morocco and Tunisia. In Asia, it is found in Israel, Lebanon, Syria and Turkey.

Europe, within Ireland, United Kingdom (where it is mostly found in the Isle of Sheppey), Albania, Croatia, Greece (incl. Crete), Italy (incl. Sardinia and Sicily), Malta, Montenegro and Slovenia. Also within south-western European countries of France (incl. Corsica), Portugal, Spain (incl. Baleares).

== Uses ==
Young leaves may be eaten raw or cooked as a leaf vegetable. It was formerly sold in markets in London for uses in pickles.

In Lebanon, it was evaluated for use in saline agriculture.
