= Saffron Trail =

Long-distance footpath in England

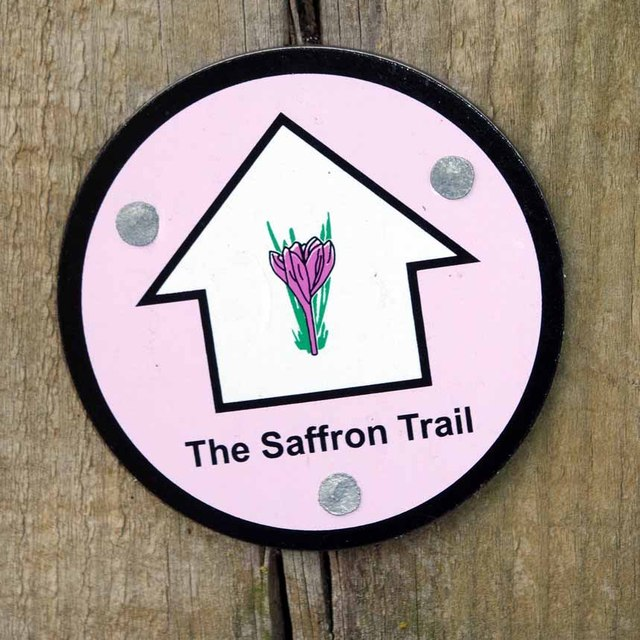

The Saffron Trail is a long-distance footpath in Essex, England. The 71-mile (114 km) path leads from the pier in Southend-on-Sea to St Mary's church in Saffron Walden. It is waymarked, and shown on Ordnance Survey mapping.

== The path ==
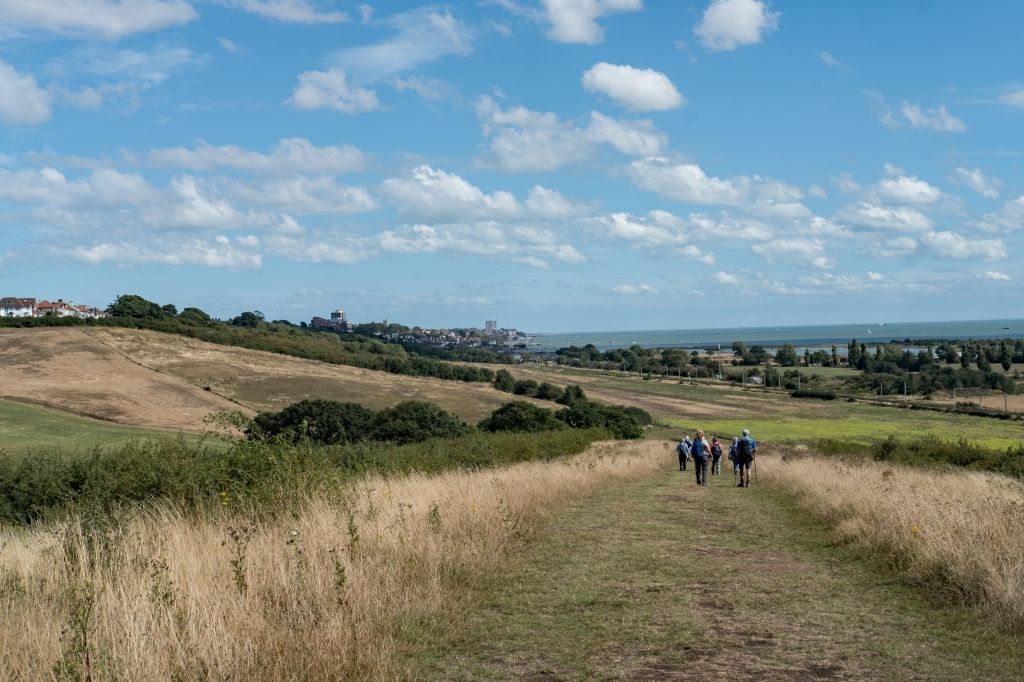
Near Hadleigh Castle

The Saffron Trail was conceived by David Hitchman in 2000, as a south-east to north-west route to complement the two west-to-east long-distance paths: the Essex Way and St Peter's Way. The name recalls the cultivation of crocuses in the Saffron Walden area from which the spice saffron is obtained, and which gives the town its name.

The trail starts at the pier in Southend-on-Sea (51°32′03″N 00°42′53″E), in the south-east of the county, and goes north-west across urban and rural Essex. It goes through fields and woodland, over commons, alongside rivers, through historic villages, and some built-up areas and finishes at the church of St Mary in Saffron Walden (52°01′28″N 00°14′19″E).

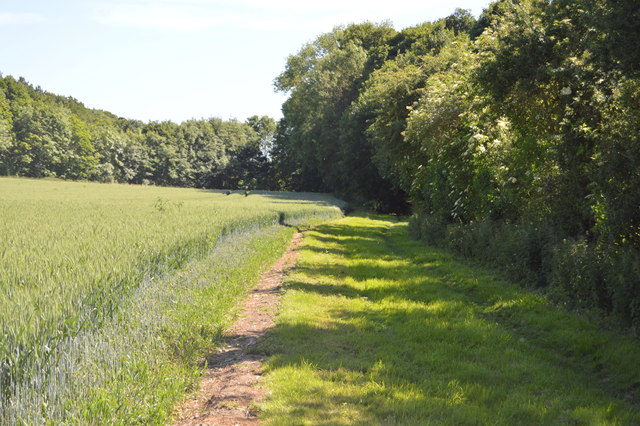
Near Saffron Walden

The trail is waymarked in both directions by a circular mauve marker with a purple crocus and the text "The Saffron Trail".

The trail has several railway stations on the route or nearby, as well as some rural bus services.

== Route ==
The Saffron Trail passes through the following locations:

Southend Pier (start), Leigh-on-Sea, Hadleigh, Eastwood, Hockley, Hullbridge, Battlesbridge, Rettendon, East Hanningfield, Danbury, Chelmsford, Broomfield, Great Waltham, Howe Street, Littley Green, Felsted, Little Dunmow, Great Dunmow, Little Easton, Great Easton, Tilty, Chickney, Henham, Widdington, Newport, Wendens Ambo, Audley End station, Saffron Walden (finish). The highest point of the walk is 121 m (397 feet) near Widdington; the lowest point is at sea level at Southend pier.

== Adjoining paths ==
The Saffron Trail adjoins several long-distance paths: Essex Way (an 81-mile (130 km) east to west walk from Epping to Harwich) intersects at Great Waltham; St Peter's Way (a 41-mile (66 km) east to west walk from Chipping Ongar to St Peter-on-the Wall at Bradwell-on-Sea) intersects at East Hanningfield; Harcamlow Way (a 141-mile (227 km) figure-of-eight walk from Harlow, Essex to Cambridge and back) intersects at Saffron Walden; Thames Estuary Path (a 29-mile (47 km) west to east walk from Tilbury Town station to Leigh-on-Sea station) intersects at Leigh-on-Sea; Roach Valley Way (a 23-mile (37 km) circular walk around Rochford and the Crouch and Roach estuaries) intersects at Hockley.
