= St Peter's Way =

Footpath in Essex, England

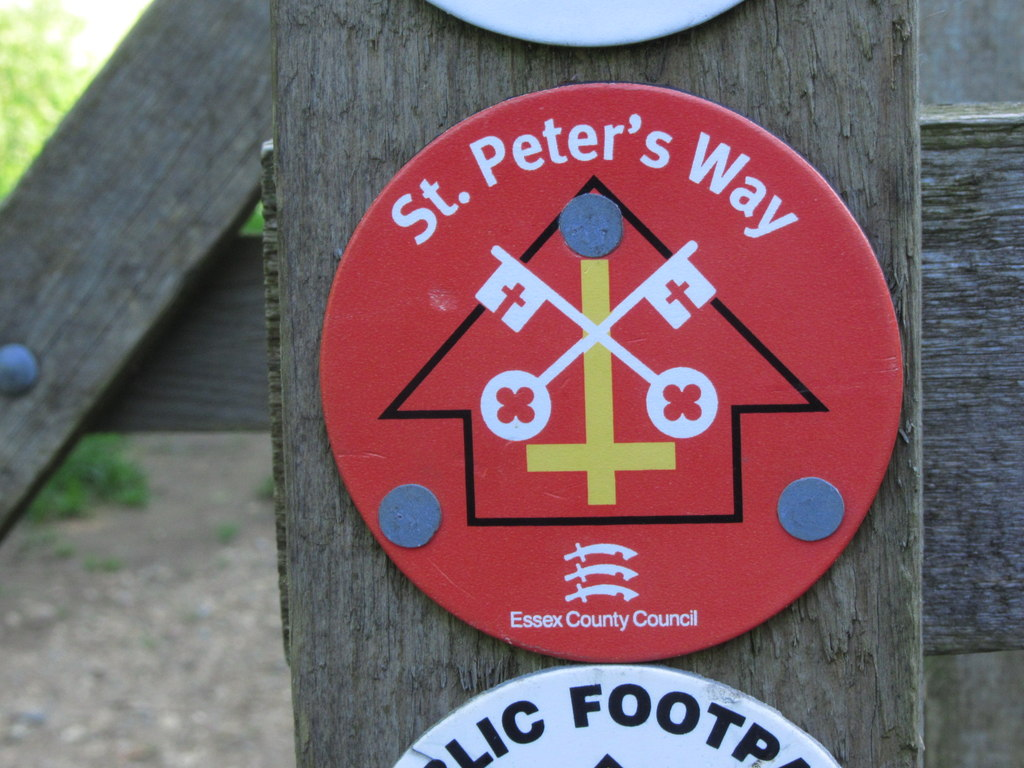

St Peter's Way is a long-distance footpath in Essex, England. The 41-mile (66 km) path leads from Chipping Ongar to the 7th-century Chapel of St Peter-on-the-Wall at Bradwell-on-Sea. It is waymarked, and shown on Ordnance Survey mapping.

== The path ==
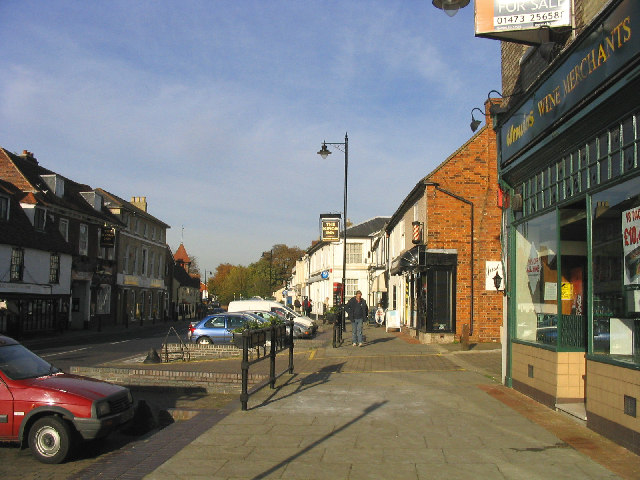
Chipping Ongar

St Peter's Way was conceived by members of the Ramblers Association in 1970, and has been "adopted" by Essex County Council.

The trail starts in Chipping Ongar (51°42′12″N 00°14′40″E), in the west of the county, and goes almost due east across rural Essex. It goes through fields and woodland, over commons, through historic villages, past Hanningfield Reservoir, to coastal marshes and along the seawall at the eastern end of the Dengie Peninsula and finishes at the chapel of St Peter-on-the-Wall (51°44′05″N 00°56′18″E) in Bradwell-on-Sea. The term "on the wall" refers to the location of the chapel built on the wall of the Roman fort of Othona. The walk can be extended westward along the Essex Way from Chipping Ongar for about a mile to Greensted Church; the walk then both starts and finishes at a Saxon church.

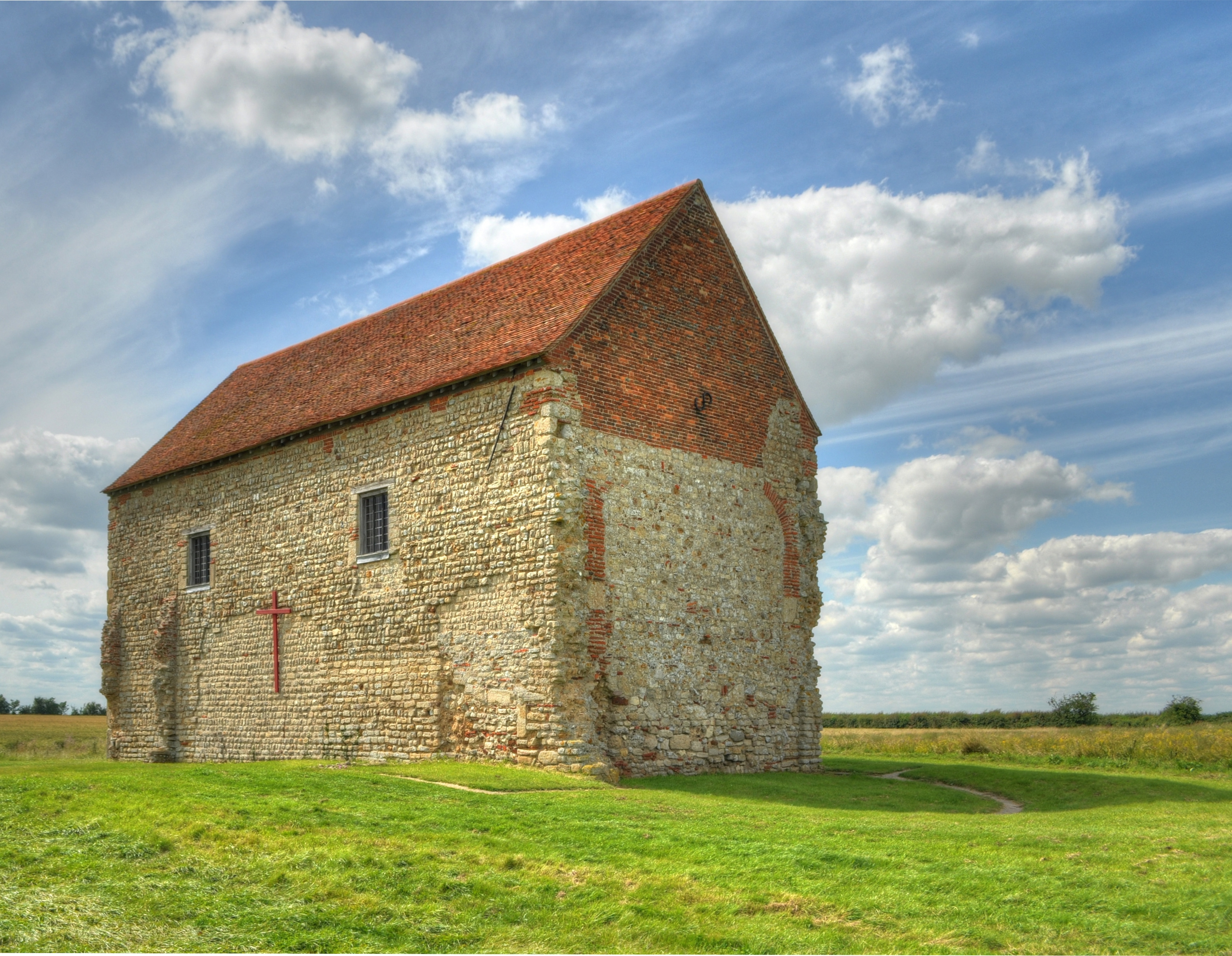
Chapel of St Peter-on-the-Wall

The trail is waymarked in both directions by a circular red marker with cross keys and inverted crucifix (symbols of Saint Peter), the text "St. Peter's Way" and the "Essex County Council" logo.

There are no railway stations on the route, except for the preserved Epping Ongar Railway. There are some rural bus services.

=== Route ===
St Peter's Way passes through the following locations: Chipping Ongar (start), High Ongar, Paslow Wood Common, Blackmore, Mill Green, Margaretting Tye, Stock, West Hanningfield, East Hanningfield, Bicknacre, Cock Clarks, Purleigh, Mundon, Maylandsea, Steeple, St Lawrence, Tillingham, the Dengie seawall, and the chapel of St Peter-on-the-Wall (finish).

The length of the trail is said to be 40 miles (64 km) (British Pilgrimage Trust), 41 miles (66 km) (Long Distance Walkers Association, or 45 miles (72 km) (Essex County Council). The highest point of the walk is 104 m (341 feet) near Mill Green. The lowest points are along the seawalls.

== Adjoining paths ==
St Peter's Way adjoins several long-distance paths: Essex Way (an 81-mile (130 km) east to west walk from Epping to Harwich) intersects at Chipping Ongar; the Saffron Trail (a 71-mile (114 km) south-east to north-west walk from Southend-on-Sea to Saffron Walden) intersects at East Hanningfield; and the Three Forests Way (a 60-mile (97 km) circular walk linking Epping, Hatfield and Hainault Forests) intersects at Chipping Ongar.
