= Epping Forest Centenary Walk =

Footpath in Essex, England

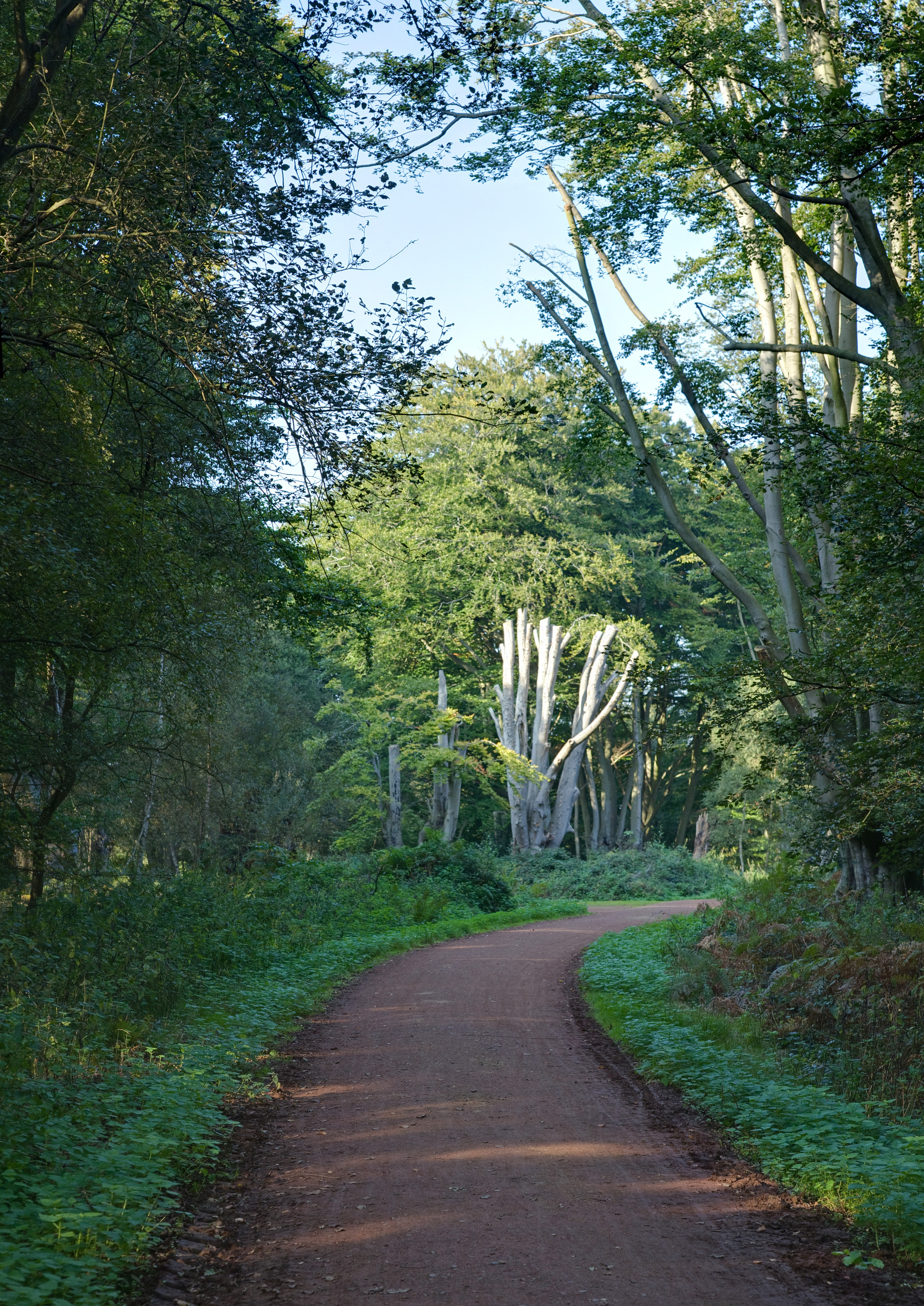
View north of High Beach

The Epping Forest Centenary Walk is a long-distance footpath in England, connecting East London to Epping Forest. It is also known as Epping Forest Big Walk. The 15 mi (24 km) path runs from Manor Park to Epping Forest using, where possible, green corridors.

== The path ==
The path leads from Manor Park Station (51°33′09″N, 0°02′47″E) to Epping Station (51°41′38″N, 0°06′ 49″E).

The walk was established in 1978 by members of the West Essex Ramblers. It was originally called the Centenary Walk. The name refers to the commemoration of the centenary of the Epping Forest Act 1878 which preserved 2,400-hectare (5,900-acre) of what was a larger Waltham forest The path of the walk has changed sightly since 1978 in line with changes to the forest.

It is named Centenary Walk on Ordnance Survey mapping.

This linear walk can be started at several locations. The route goes through both urban and ‘green’ areas. These include parkland, playing fields, a golf course, urban streets, green footpaths, fields and woodland.

Several railway and underground stations are close to the walk.

== Route ==
The Epping Forest Centenary Walk passes through the following locations: Manor Park, Wanstead Flats, Leytonstone, Bush Wood, Leyton Flats, Highams Park, Woodford golf course, Epping Forest, Connaught Water, Peartree Plain, Hill Wood, High Beech, Blackweir Hill, Little Monk Wood, Golding's Hill, Coppice Row, Epping Thicks, Bell Common, Epping station.

== Adjoining paths ==
The Epping Forest Centenary Walk adjoins four long-distance paths:

- Three Forests Way (a 60-mile (97 km) circular walk linking Epping, Hatfield and Hainault forests) intersects at Epping Forest Field Centre
- Forest Way, Essex (a 25-mile (40 km) walk from Loughton to Hatfield Forest Country Park) intersects Epping Forest Field Centre
- Essex Way (an 81-mile (130 km) east to west walk from Epping to Harwich) intersects at Epping station
- London Loop (the 150-mile (240 km) London Outer Orbital Path (LOOP)) intersects at Chingford
