= West Thurrock Lagoon and Marshes =

Protected area in West Thurrock, Essex, England

Coordinates: 51.464°N 0.282°E

- Site of Special Scientific Interest
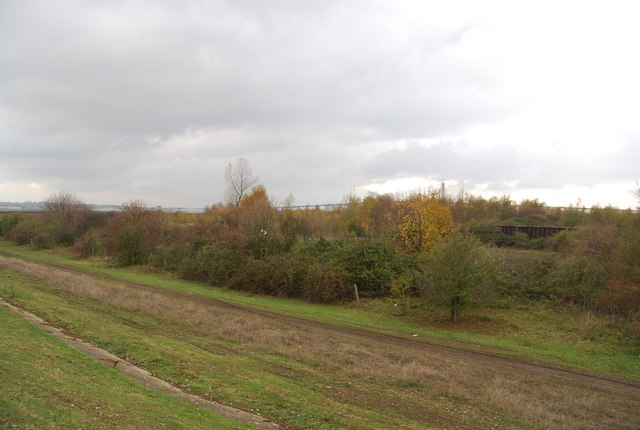
- Location of West Thurrock Lagoon and Marshes.
- Area of search: Essex
- Grid reference: TQ 585766
- Interest: Biological
- Area: 66.1 ha (163 acres)
- Notification date: 1991
- Location map: Magic map

West Thurrock Lagoon and Marshes is a 66.1-hectare (163-acre) biological Site of Special Scientific Interest in West Thurrock in Essex.

The site is important for wintering waders and wildfowl which feed on the mudflats. Reed warblers, sedge warblers and bearded tits breed on reed beds in the lagoon, and teals and grey herons roost on the shallow waters and grassy islands. Stone Ness saltings is a large area of salt marsh dominated by sea club-rush. The conservation charity Buglife fought to prevent development of the site, and succeeded in 2014.

The Thames Estuary Path goes through West Thurrock Marshes.
