= Stort Valley Way =

Footpath in Essex, England

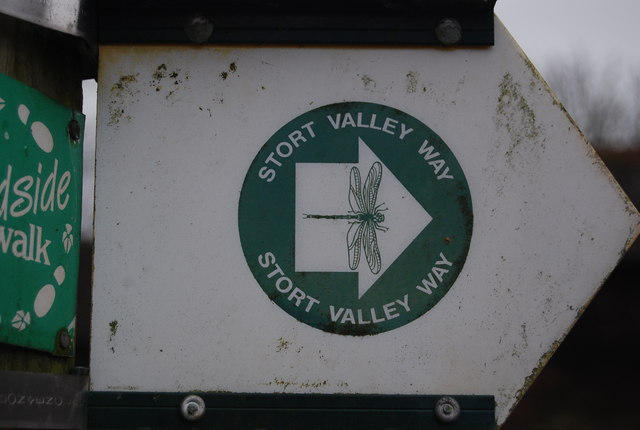
Stort Valley Way waymark

The Stort Valley Way is a long-distance footpath in west Essex, England. The 30-mile (48 km) circular path is centred on Harlow and the Stort Navigation. It is waymarked, and named on Ordnance Survey mapping.

== The path ==
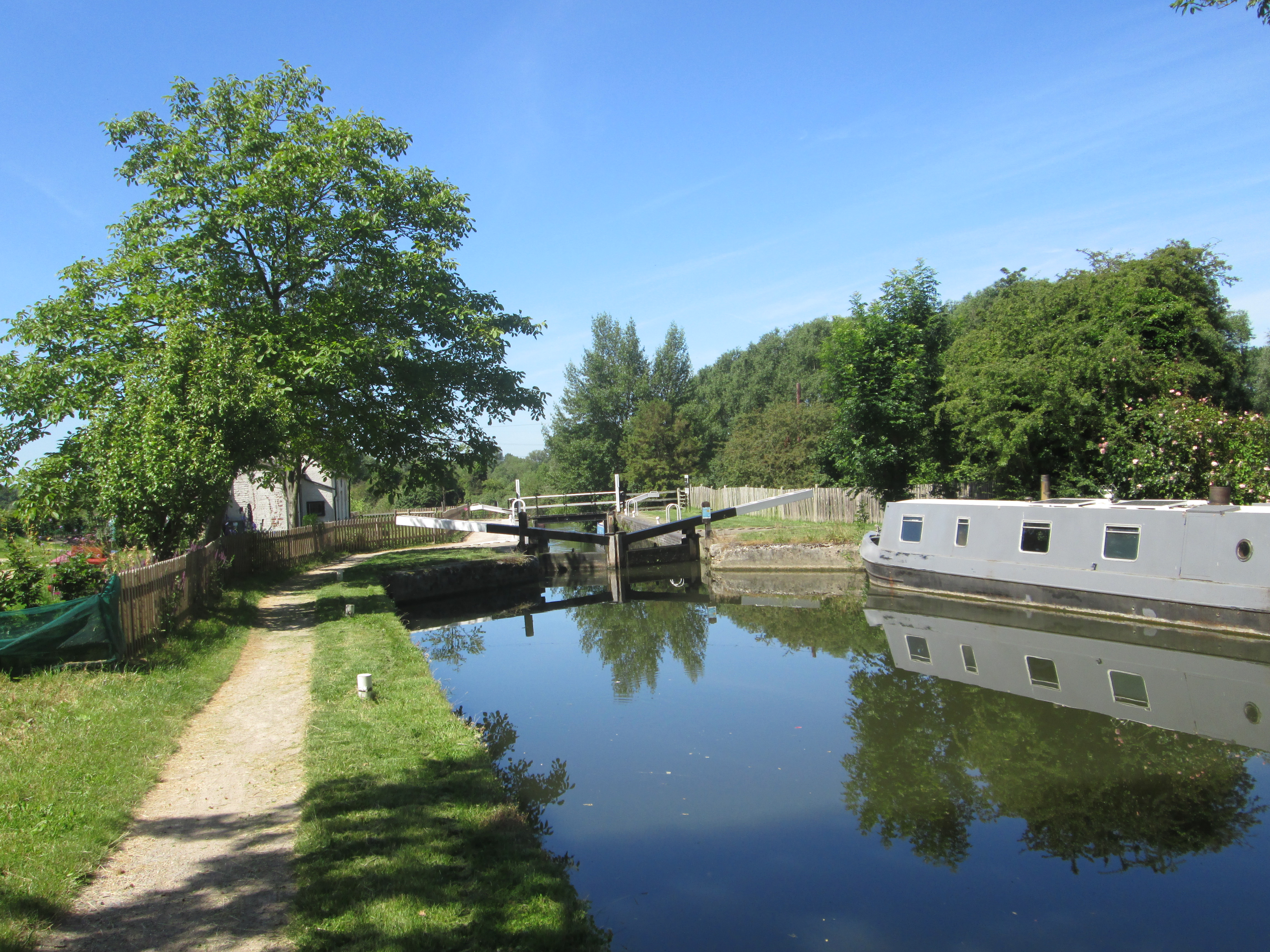
View at Roydon

The name Stort Valley Way refers to the River Stort, which rises near Langley, Essex, and is navigable from Bishop’s Stortford downstream (the Stort Navigation) to its confluence with the River Lea near Rye House. The way is a circular path centred on Harlow, together with villages to the south and south-east.

The circular walk can be started at several locations and can follow a clockwise or anti-clockwise direction. The route goes through both rural and some urban areas. These include fields, pasture, water meadow and woodland; along rural roads and through villages and some built-up areas. A significant part of the walk is along the towing path of the Stort Navigation.

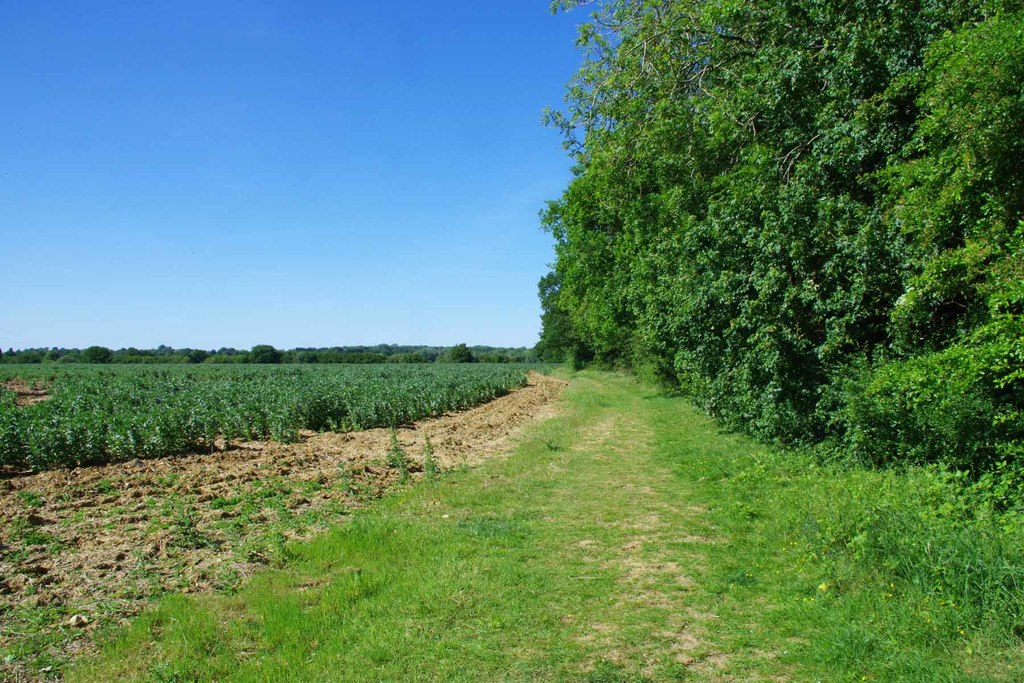
Section not following the river, at High Laver

The path is waymarked in both directions by a dark green circular marker with a white or yellow arrow, a dragonfly and the text ‘Stort Valley Way’.

Roydon, Harlow Town, Harlow Mill and Sawbridgeworth railway stations are close to the walk, and some villages have a bus service.

== Route ==
The Stort Valley Way passes through the following locations (the order assumes starting at Roydon in a clockwise direction): Roydon, Harlow, Sawbridgeworth, Lower Sheering, Sheering, Matching, Matching Tye, Loyter’s Green, Magdalen Laver, Hastingwood, Latton Bush, Rye Hill, Epping Green, Bumbles Green, Nazeing, Nazeingwood Common, Roydon Hamlet and Roydon.

== Adjoining paths ==
The Stort Valley Way adjoins three long-distance paths:

- Harcamlow Way (a 141-mile (227 km) figure-of-eight walk from Harlow, Essex to Cambridge and back) intersects from Roydon to Sawbridgeworth
- Three Forests Way (a 60-mile/97 km circular walk linking Epping, Hatfield and Hainault forests) intersects from Epping Green to Roydon Hamlet, and from Roydon to Sheering
- Forest Way, Essex (a 25-mile (40 km) walk from Loughton to Hatfield Forest Country Park) intersects from Latton Bush to Nazeingwood Common
