= Stour and Copperas Woods, Ramsey =

Woodlands in Essex, England

Coordinates: 51.935°N 1.184°E

- Site of Special Scientific Interest
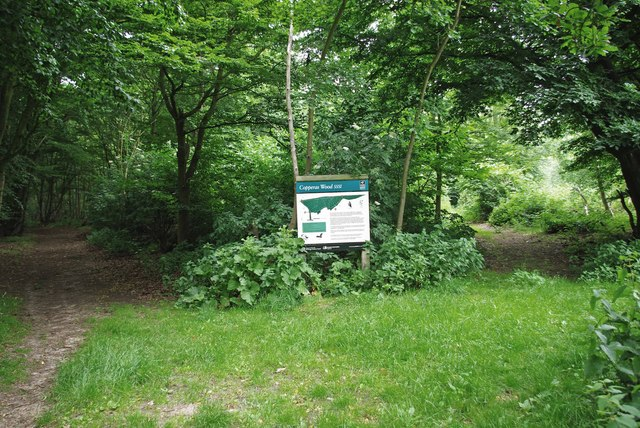
- Copperas Wood
- Location of Stour and Copperas Woods, Ramsey.
- Area of search: Essex
- Grid reference: TM 190313; TM 202316
- Interest: Biological
- Area: 77.1 ha (191 acres)
- Notification date: 1984
- Location map: Magic Map

Stour and Copperas Woods, Ramsey is a 77.1-hectare (191-acre) biological Site of Special Scientific Interest between Wrabness and Ramsey in Essex. It is two separate areas, Stour Wood, which is owned by the Woodland Trust and managed by the Royal Society for the Protection of Birds, and Copperas Wood, which is owned and managed by the Essex Wildlife Trust. It is in the Suffolk Coast and Heaths Area of Outstanding Natural Beauty.

The site is ancient coppiced woodland on the southern shore of Stour Estuary, and is the only area in the county where woodland and coastal habitats meet. The dominant tree is chestnut, with a ground layer of bramble. Other plants include yellow archangel and dog's mercury.

The B1362 road runs along the south of both sites, and The Essex Way goes through Copperas Wood.
