= Copperas Wood =

Nature reserve in Essex, England

Coordinates: 51.939°N 1.200°E

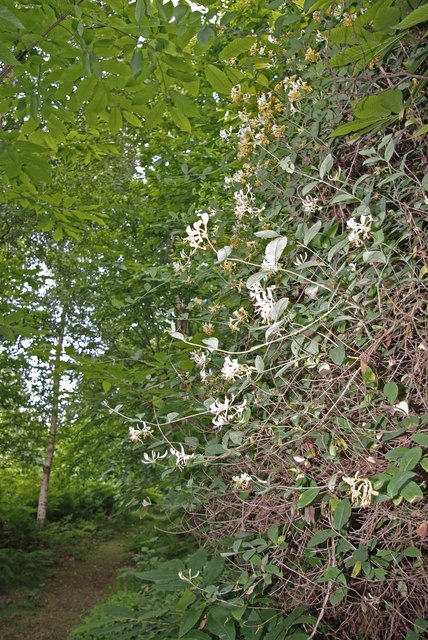
- Interactive map of Copperas Wood
- Type: Nature reserve
- Location: Ramsey, Essex
- OS grid: TM 199 312
- Area: 13.8 hectares (34 acres)
- Manager: Essex Wildlife Trust

Copperas Wood is a 13.8-hectare (34-acre) nature reserve between Ramsey and Wrabness in Essex. It is owned and managed by the Essex Wildlife Trust, and is part of the Stour and Copperas Woods, Ramsey Site of Special Scientific Interest.

This is ancient sweet chestnut and hornbeam coppice. The Great Storm of 1987 caused severe damage, and some areas have been left to regenerate naturally. Around 100 bird species have been observed, out of which 43 are nesting, and there are 23 butterfly species and over 300 of moths.

The Essex Way goes through the reserve from Wrabness Road.
