= Breeds, Essex =

Hamlet in Essex, England

Coordinates: 51.7897°N 0.4522°E

Breeds
- Location within Essex
- Civil parish: Great Waltham
- District: Chelmsford
- Shire county: Essex
- Region: East
- Country: England
- Sovereign state: United Kingdom
- Police: Essex
- Fire: Essex
- Ambulance: East of England

Breeds is a hamlet in the civil parish of Great Waltham, in the Chelmsford district of Essex, England. It is situated on South Street of the village of Great Waltham, to which it is conjoined, and of which it is part. The county town of Chelmsford is approximately 2 miles (3 km) to the south.
