= Broad's Green =

Hamlet in Essex, England

Coordinates: 51.7849°N 0.4522°E

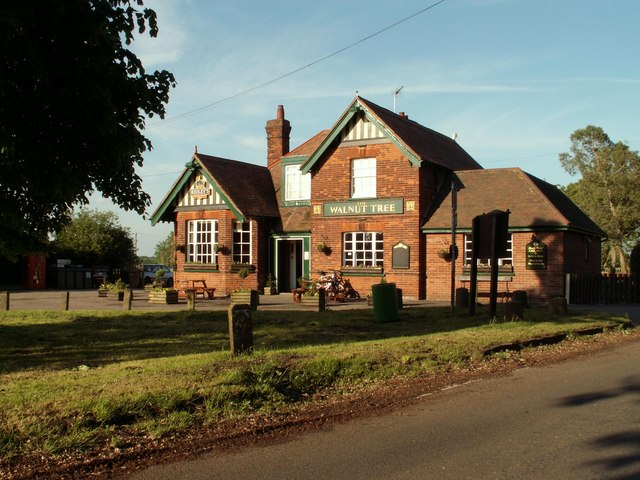
- The Walnut Tree pub

- Location within Essex
- OS grid reference: TL692124
- Civil parish: Great Waltham
- District: Chelmsford
- Shire county: Essex
- Region: East
- Country: England
- Sovereign state: United Kingdom
- Postcode district: CM3
- Police: Essex
- Fire: Essex
- Ambulance: East of England

Broads Green is a hamlet in the civil parish of Great Waltham and the Chelmsford district, of Essex, England.

Nearby settlements include the town of Chelmsford and the villages of Great Waltham and Little Waltham. For transport there is the B1008 road, the A131 road and the A130 road nearby. Broad's Green public house is The Walnut Tree.
