= Fanner's Green =

Hamlet in Essex, England

Coordinates: 51.782°N 0.437°E

Fanners Green
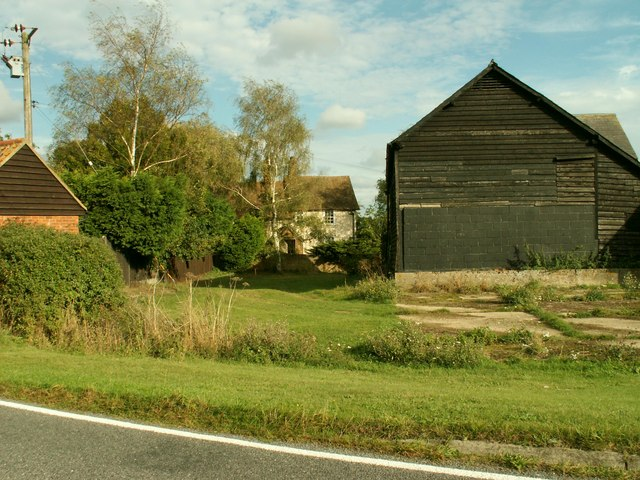
- Walnut Tree Farm

- Location within Essex
- Civil parish: Great Waltham
- District: Chelmsford
- Shire county: Essex
- Region: East
- Country: England
- Sovereign state: United Kingdom
- Police: Essex
- Fire: Essex
- Ambulance: East of England

Fanners Green is a hamlet and cul-de-sac road in the civil parish of Great Waltham, in the Chelmsford district of Essex, England. It is situated 1 mile (1.6 km) south-west from the village of Great Waltham. The county town of Chelmsford is approximately 2 miles (3 km) to the south-east. Fanners Green comprises Fanners farm, and a barn 200 yards (183 m) south on Breeds Road.
