= Forest Way, Essex =

Footpath in Essex, England

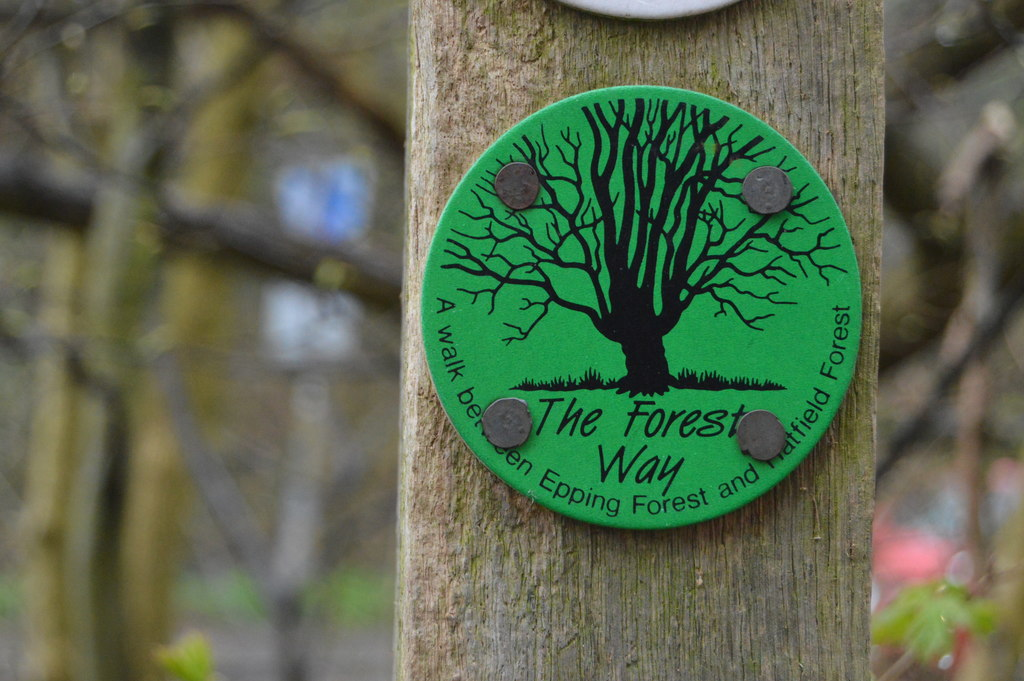
The Forest Way Waymark

The Forest Way, Essex is a long-distance footpath in west Essex, England. The 25-mile (40 km) path runs from Loughton via Epping Forest to Hatfield Forest. It is waymarked, and named on Ordnance Survey mapping.

== The path ==
The path runs from Loughton station (51°38’29”N 0°03’20”E) to Hatfield Forest (51°51′28″N 0°13′45″E).

The name Forest Way refers to the two forests which this path connects, the 2,400-hectare (5,900-acre) Epping Forest and the 403-hectare (996-acre) Hatfield Forest. The walk was developed by Essex County Council as part of its ‘Ways through Essex’ project, to help people enjoy the Essex countryside.

The linear walk can be started at several locations and can follow a West to East or East to West direction. The route goes through both rural and some urban areas. These include fields, pasture, and woodland; along rural roads and through villages and some built-up areas.

The path is waymarked in both directions by a green circular marker with a black leafless tree and the text: ‘The Forest Way’ 'A walk between Epping Forest and Hatfield Forest'.

Several railway and underground stations are close to the west end of the walk, and some villages have a bus service.

== Route ==
The Forest Way passes through the following locations: Loughton station, Epping Forest Field Centre, Upshire, Epping Green, Rye Hill Common, Latton Bush, Potter Street, Matching Tye, Matching, Gunnets Green, Hatfield Heath, The Ryes, Hatfield Forest Country Park.

== Adjoining paths ==
The Forest Way adjoins four long-distance paths:

- Stort Valley Way (a 30-mile (48 km) circular walk along the Stort Navigation Sawbridgeworth and Roydon) intersects from Latton Bush to Nazeingwood Common
- Three Forests Way (a 60-mile (97 km) circular walk linking Epping, Hatfield and Hainault forests) intersects from Loughton to Epping Green
- Epping Forest Centenary Walk (a 15-mile (24 km) walk from Manor Park to Epping) intersects at Epping Forest
- Flitch Way (a 15-mile (25-km) walk from Braintree Station to Bishop's Stortford) intersects at Hatfield Forest Country Park
