= John Ray Walk =

9-mile footpath in Essex, England

The John Ray Walk is a linear footpath from Braintree to Witham in Essex, England. The 9-mile (14.4 km) footpath follows the valley of the River Brain.

== Path ==
The path commemorates the life of the 17th-century natural philosopher and botanist John Ray (1627–1705) who was born, and is buried, in Black Notley. The path is a collaborative partnership between Essex County Council’s ‘Ways through Essex’ project, Braintree District Council, local parish councils, the Ramblers Association and the John Ray Trust.

The path was established in 2000. It is waymarked with a circular white marker with a yellow buttercup flower and the text ‘John Ray Walk’.

The walk starts and ends at a railway station: Braintree (51°52′31″N 0°33′25″E) and Witham (51°48′21″N 0°38′21″E) but can be accessed at several locations. The route goes through both urban and "green" areas. These include urban streets at either end, and fields, woodland, water meadows, parkland and playing fields.

== Route ==
The route heads south from Braintree, across the A120, past John Ray Cottage and Black Notley Hall, through Black Notley, then east through woodland to the railway, to White Notley then across the railway to Cressing Temple, then to the west of Silver End across fields approaching Witham from the east along the railway to Witham station.

== Adjoining paths ==
The John Ray Walk adjoins three named paths:

- The Flitch Way (a 15-mile (25-km) walk from Braintree Station to Bishops Stortford) adjoins at Braintree station.
- Essex Way (an 81-mile (130 km) east to west walk from Epping to Harwich) adjoins near White Notley station.
- Blackwater rail trail (an 8-mile (13 km) path along the course of the former Witham to Maldon railway line) adjoins at Witham
