= Roach Valley Way =

Footpath in Essex, England

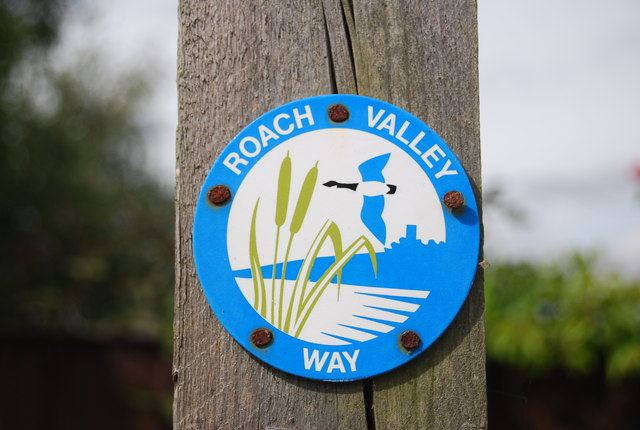
Roach Valley Way waymark

The Roach Valley Way is a long-distance footpath in south-east Essex, England. The 23-mile (37 km) circular path is centred on Rochford and the River Crouch and Roach estuaries. It is waymarked, and named on Ordnance Survey mapping.

== The path ==
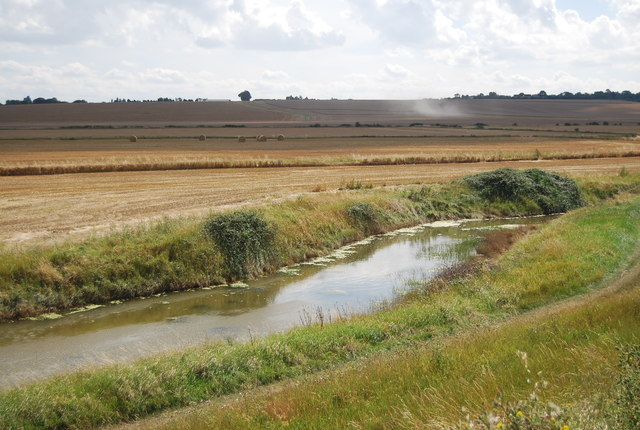
View at Canewdon

The Roach Valley Way was devised around 1997. Its name refers to the River Roach which arises as four streams in the Rayleigh Hills. It is a circular path centred on the market town of Rochford, together with adjoining parishes and villages.

The circular walk can be started at several locations and walked in either a clockwise or anti-clockwise direction. The route goes through both rural and some urban areas. These include fields, pasture, marsh and ancient woodland, along rural roads as well as through villages and some built-up areas. A significant part of the walk is along sea walls overlooking the coastal margin of the estuaries of the River Crouch and the River Roach.

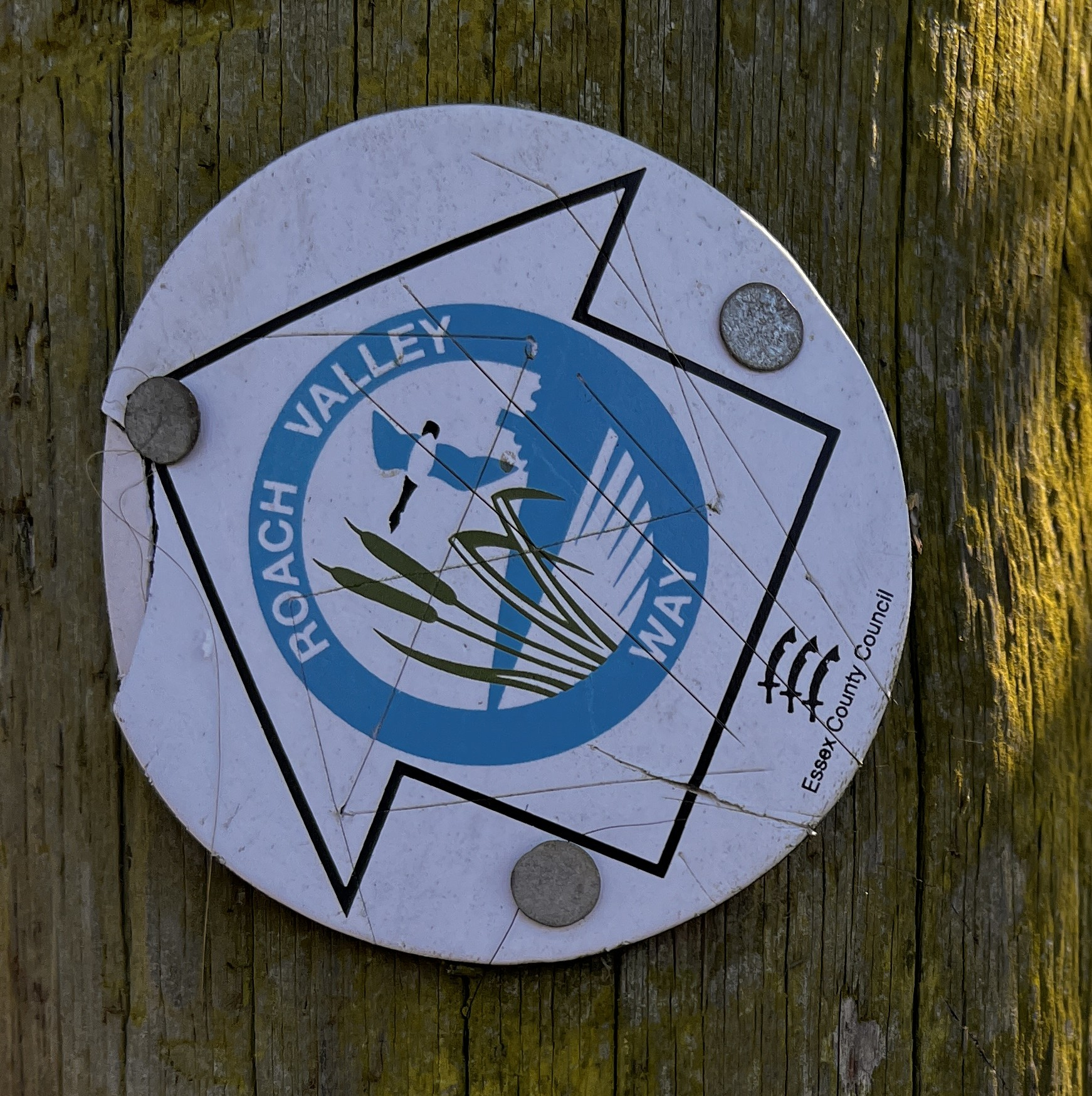
Roach Valley Way alternative design

The path is waymarked in both directions by a circular blue marker with yellow bull rushes and the text ‘Roach Valley Way’.

Rochford and Hockley railway stations are close to the walk, and some villages have bus services.

== Route ==
The Roach Valley Way passes through the following locations (the order assumes starting at Rochford in an anticlockwise direction): Rochford, Stambridge, Paglesham, Canewdon, Ashingdon, Hawkwell, Hockley and Rochford.

== Adjoining paths ==
The Roach Valley Way adjoins the long-distance Saffron Trail (a 71-mile (114 km) south-east to north-west walk from Southend-on-Sea to Saffron Walden) they intersect in Hockley woods.
