= Littley Green =

Hamlet in Essex, England

Coordinates: 51.827°N 0.463°E

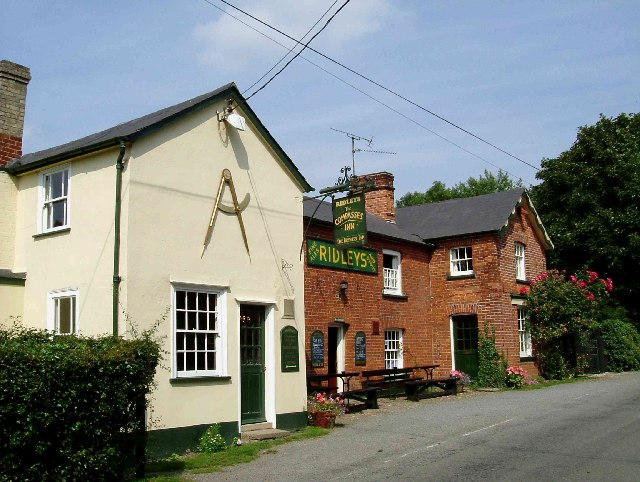
- The Compasses Inn

- Location within Essex
- OS grid reference: TL698170
- Civil parish: Great Waltham
- District: Chelmsford
- Shire county: Essex
- Region: East
- Country: England
- Sovereign state: United Kingdom
- Post town: CHELMSFORD
- Postcode district: CM3
- Dialling code: 01245
- Police: Essex
- Fire: Essex
- Ambulance: East of England

Littley Green is a hamlet in the civil parish of Great Waltham, in the Chelmsford borough of Essex, England. The hamlet is at the extreme north of Great Waltham, with the nearest settlement the hamlet of Hartford End, less than 1 mile (2 km) west in the civil parish of Felsted.

At the north-west edge of the hamlet and within the parish is the 319 acres (1.3 km^{2}) residential farm of Littley Park. The house is timber framed and plastered, dates to the 16th century, and is Grade II listed. Littley Park was in the possession of Richard Rich (1496/7 – 1567), Lord Chancellor and founder of Felsted School, who gained the property after the suppression of the monasteries. It was put up for sale in 2017 at a guide price of above £5m.

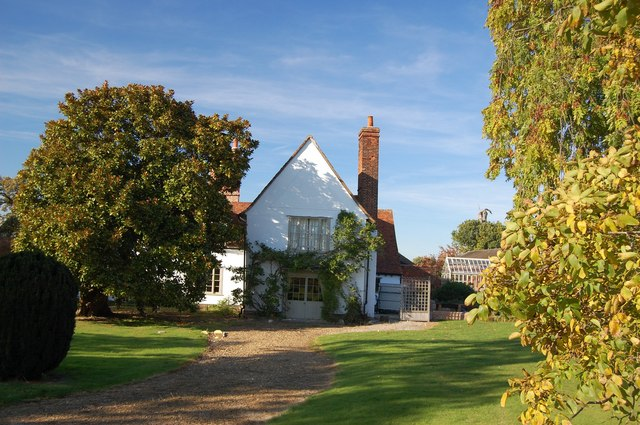
Littley Park

Other listed buildings at Littley Green included the timber framed and plastered houses, dating from the 15th to 17th century, of Bywater House, Butlers, Butlers Hall, Hope cottage, Mabb's Farmhouse, and Oak House which was formerly the Royal Oak Inn.

From 1882 to at least 1914, Littley Green was in the ecclesiastical parish of Ford End, also known as Forth End, which was formed out of Great Waltham, and centred on the village of Ford End 1.5 miles (2.4 km) to the west. In 1882, Littley Green had a beer retailer and pig dealer, and one farmer at Littley Park; in 1894 two, with the extra farmer at Butler's Lodge. A licensed victualler at The Compasses public house was listed in the late 19th century to at least the First World War; in 1894 he was also a shopkeeper. In 1902, a blacksmith and beer retailer was listed, but just a blacksmith in 1914.

Littley Green has a public house called The Compasses Inn.
