= Stour Wood =

Woodland near Wrabness, Essex, England

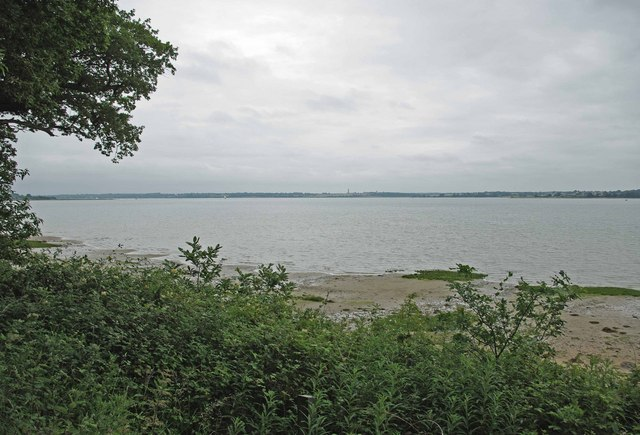

- Location within Essex
- Interactive map of Stour Wood

Geography
- Location: Essex, England
- OS grid: TM189310
- Coordinates: 51.935°N 1.1829°E
- Area: 54.07 hectares (133.61 acres)

Administration
- Authority: Woodland Trust

Stour Wood is a woodland in Essex, England, near the village of Wrabness. It covers a total area of 54.07 hectares (133.61 acres). It is owned by the Woodland Trust, and managed by the Royal Society for the Protection of Birds. It is part of the Stour and Copperas Woods, Ramsey Site of Special Scientific Importance.
