= Three Forests Way =

Footpath in Essex and Hertfordshire, England

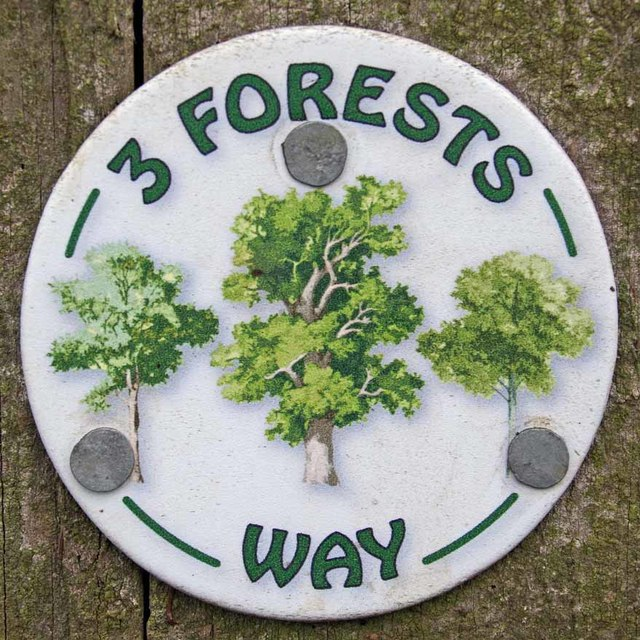
Three Forests Way waymark

The Three Forests Way is a long-distance footpath in Essex and Hertfordshire, England. The 59-mile (95 km) circular path passes through three forests in west Essex. It is waymarked, and named on Ordnance Survey mapping.

== The path ==
The Three Forests Way was devised in 1977 by the West Essex branch of the Ramblers Association to commemorate the Silver Jubilee of Queen Elizabeth II. The path provides a connection between three forests in west Essex: Epping Forest, Hainault Forest and Hatfield Forest. It is a circular path centred on Epping. It extends almost to Stansted Airport in the north, to Roydon to the west, south to Chigwell, and east to Fyfield. It is mostly located in Essex but a short section extends into Hertfordshire. Several long distance and local paths intersect or follow the same route as the Three Forests Way for part of their course.

The circular Three Forests Way can be joined at several locations and walked in either a clockwise or anti-clockwise direction. The route goes through both rural and urban landscapes. These include fields, pasture and woodland, along rural roads as well as through rural villages and built-up areas. Part of the way is along the tow-path of the River Stort.

The path is waymarked in both directions by a circular marker with three trees and the text ‘3 Forests Way’.

There are some accessible railway stations on the west side of the path, and some villages have bus services.

== Route ==
The Three Forests Way passes through the following locations (the order assumes starting at Chipping Ongar in an anticlockwise direction):

Chipping Ongar, High Ongar, Fyfield, Claydon's Green, Abbess Roding, White Roding, Hatfield Broad Oak, Hatfield Forest Country Park, Great Hallingbury, Little Hallingbury, Lower Sheering, Sawbridgeworth, Harlow, Roydon, Broardley Common, Nazingwood Common, Epping Green, Upshire, Epping Forest, Loughton, Chigwell, Chigwell Row, Hainault Forest Country Park, Lambourne, Abridge, Theydon Mount, Stanford Rivers, Chipping Ongar

== Adjoining paths ==
The Three Forests Way adjoins several long-distance paths:

- Epping Forest Centenary Walk (a 15-mile (24 km) walk from Manor Park to Epping) intersects at Epping Forest
- Essex Way (an 81-mile (130 km) east to west walk from Epping to Harwich) intersects at Chipping Ongar
- Forest Way, Essex (a 25-mile (40 km) walk from Loughton to Hatfield Forest Country Park) intersects from Loughton to Epping Green
- Harcamlow Way (a 141-mile (227 km) figure-of-eight walk from Harlow, Essex to Cambridge and back) intersects from Roydon to Hatfield Forest Country Park
- London Loop (the 150-mile (240 km) London Outer Orbital Path (LOOP)) intersects at Chigwell
- St Peter's Way (a 41-mile (66 km) east to west walk from Chipping Ongar to St Peter-on-the Wall at Bradwell-on-Sea) intersects at Chipping Ongar
- Stort Valley Way (a 30-mile (48 km) circular walk along the Stort Navigation Sawbridgeworth and Roydon) intersects from Sheering to Roydon
