= Great Waltham =

Village in Essex, England

Coordinates: 51.793598°N 0.45738000°E

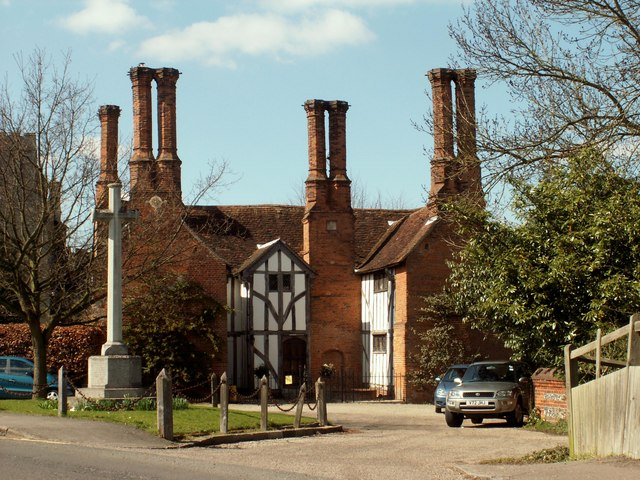
- Great Waltham Guildhall

- Location within Essex
- Population: 2,329 (Parish, 2021)
- OS grid reference: TL6960213455
- Civil parish: Great Waltham
- District: Chelmsford
- Shire county: Essex
- Region: East
- Country: England
- Sovereign state: United Kingdom
- Post town: CHELMSFORD
- Postcode district: CM3
- Dialling code: 01245
- Police: Essex
- Fire: Essex
- Ambulance: East of England

Great Waltham, also known as Church End, is a village and civil parish in the Chelmsford district of Essex, England. At the 2021 census the parish had a population of 2,329.

== Description ==
The parish contains the village of Ford End, and the hamlets of Broad's Green, Howe Street, Littley Green, North End and Fanner's Green, and the hamlet of Breeds, part of Great Waltham village. Walthambury Brook, a tributary of the River Chelmer, flows west to east through the parish and at the north of the village.

It is twinned with the French town of Ceyrat.

== History ==
Local woman Elizabeth Lowys was the first English woman executed for witchcraft in 1565, after the passing of the Witchcraft Act 1563.

== Landmarks ==
There were Roman settlements in the area. The Church of St Mary and St Lawrence is of Norman or earlier origin and is constructed of flint and stone. There is an Elizabethan guildhall, also known as Badynghams, and a Grade I listed house called Langley's.

== Amenities ==
The village has a primary school, a post office, two churches and a few pubs. It had a bakery, a garage and a small fire station but they closed down in the late 1900s. The village of Little Waltham is about one mile away.

== See also ==
- The Hundred Parishes
