= Ford End =

Village in Essex, England

Coordinates: 51.824°N 0.430°E

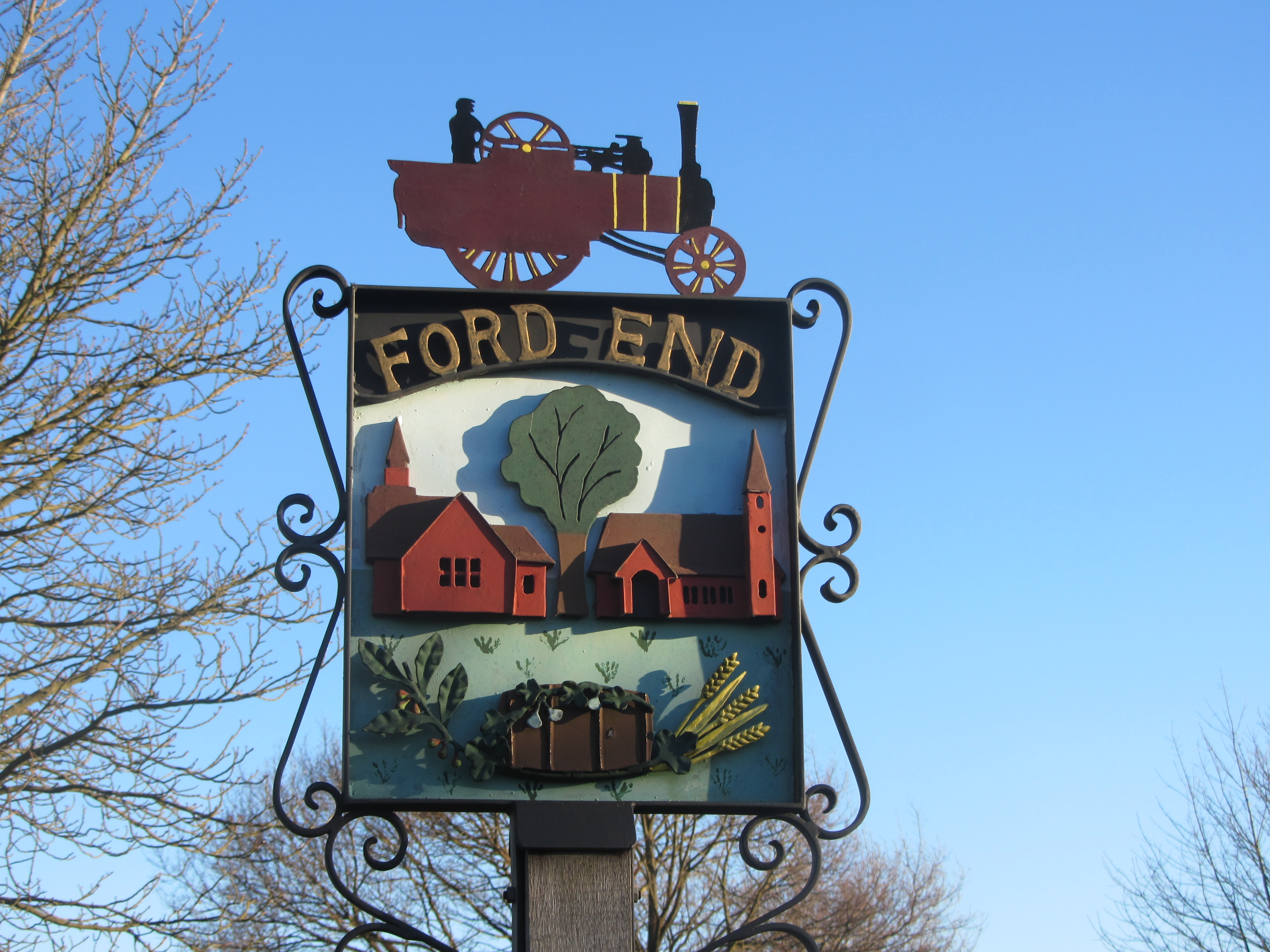
- Village Sign

- Location within Essex
- Area: 0.230 km^{2} (0.089 sq mi)
- Population: 733 (2018 estimate)
  - Density: 3,187/km^{2} (8,250/sq mi)
- OS grid reference: TL674167
- Civil parish: Great Waltham
- District: Chelmsford
- Shire county: Essex
- Region: East
- Country: England
- Sovereign state: United Kingdom
- Post town: CHELMSFORD
- Postcode district: CM3
- Dialling code: 01245
- Police: Essex
- Fire: Essex
- Ambulance: East of England
- UK Parliament: West Chelmsford

Ford End is a small village in the parish of Great Waltham halfway between Chelmsford and Great Dunmow in Essex, England, comprising over 150 houses. In 2018 it had an estimated population of 733. Circa 1870, it had a population of 775 as recorded in the Imperial Gazetteer of England and Wales.

== History ==
First houses were built at Ford End at least in the 15th century. A map of 1773 shows the village as Fourth End.

During World War II, High-frequency direction finding stations, known as "Huff-Duff", were built in the area as part of an electronic system, a principal goal of which was detection of German submarines in the Battle of the Atlantic.

== Buildings ==
Ford End has several interesting buildings, among which are the Victorian school and church as well as some thatched cottages that might be dated back to the late 15th century – among them the Little Owls.

=== School ===
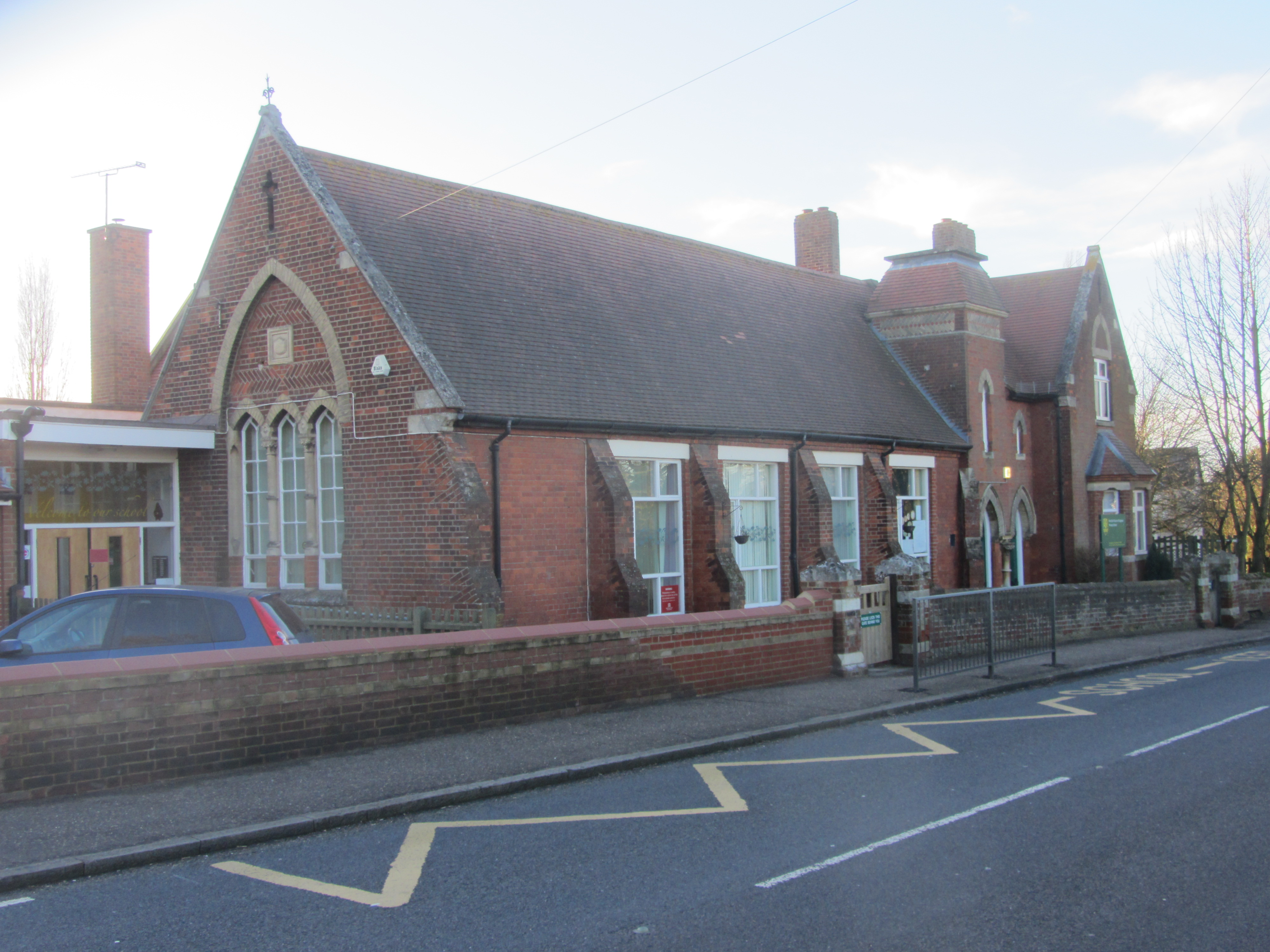
Ford End Church of England Primary School

One of Ford End's buildings is the Ford End Church of England Primary School, located at Main Road. This Victorian building was built by J. J. Tufnell in 1869 and was opened 1872, consisting at that time in one large hall. Several building works took place since then, the first at 1873, the last at 2008.

=== Church ===
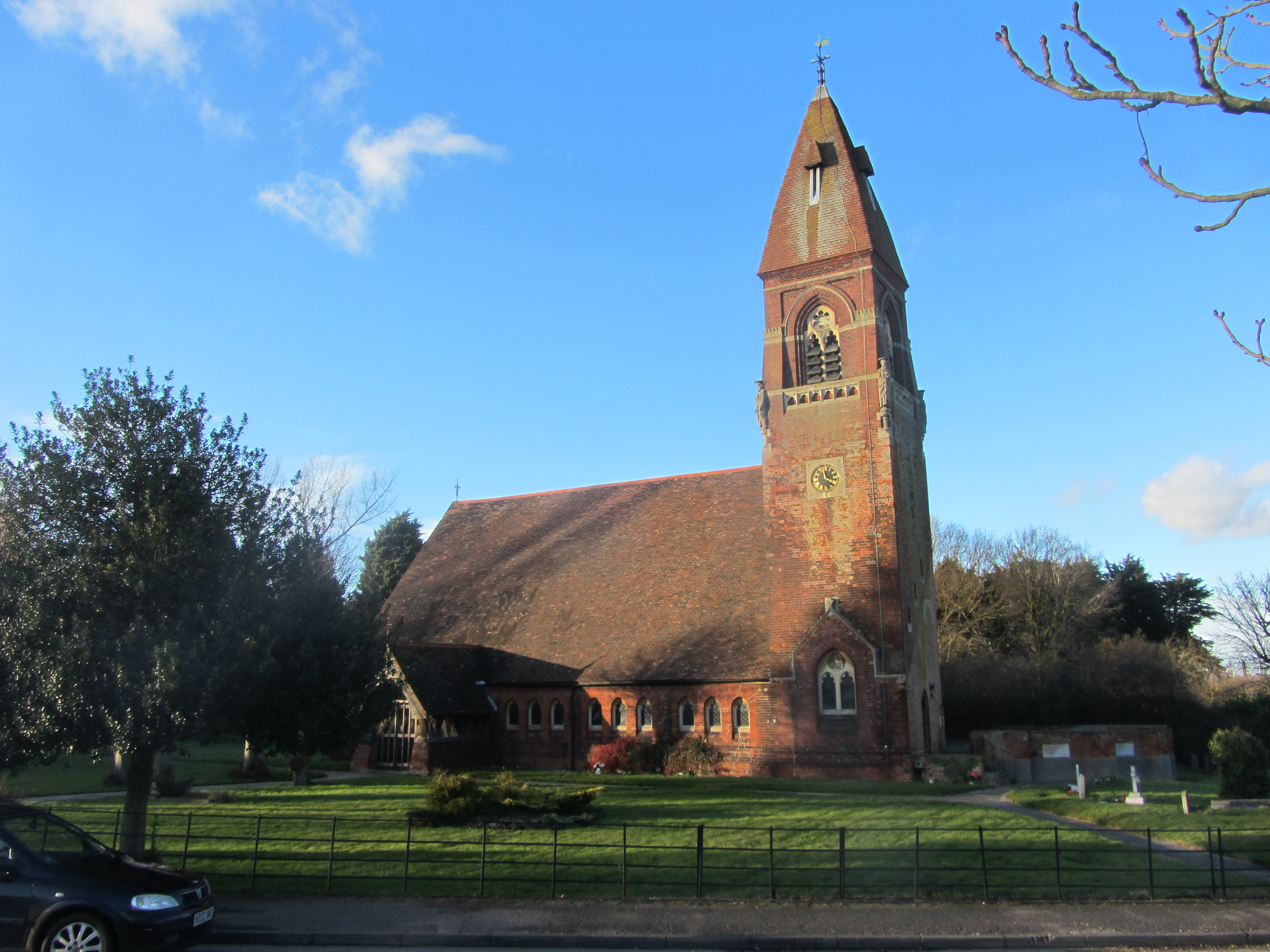
Ford End Church St John the Evangelist

A main building of Ford End is the church St John the Evangelist. It is located near the school at Church Lane. It was built in 1870 and is designed by Frederic Chancellor.

=== Little Owls ===
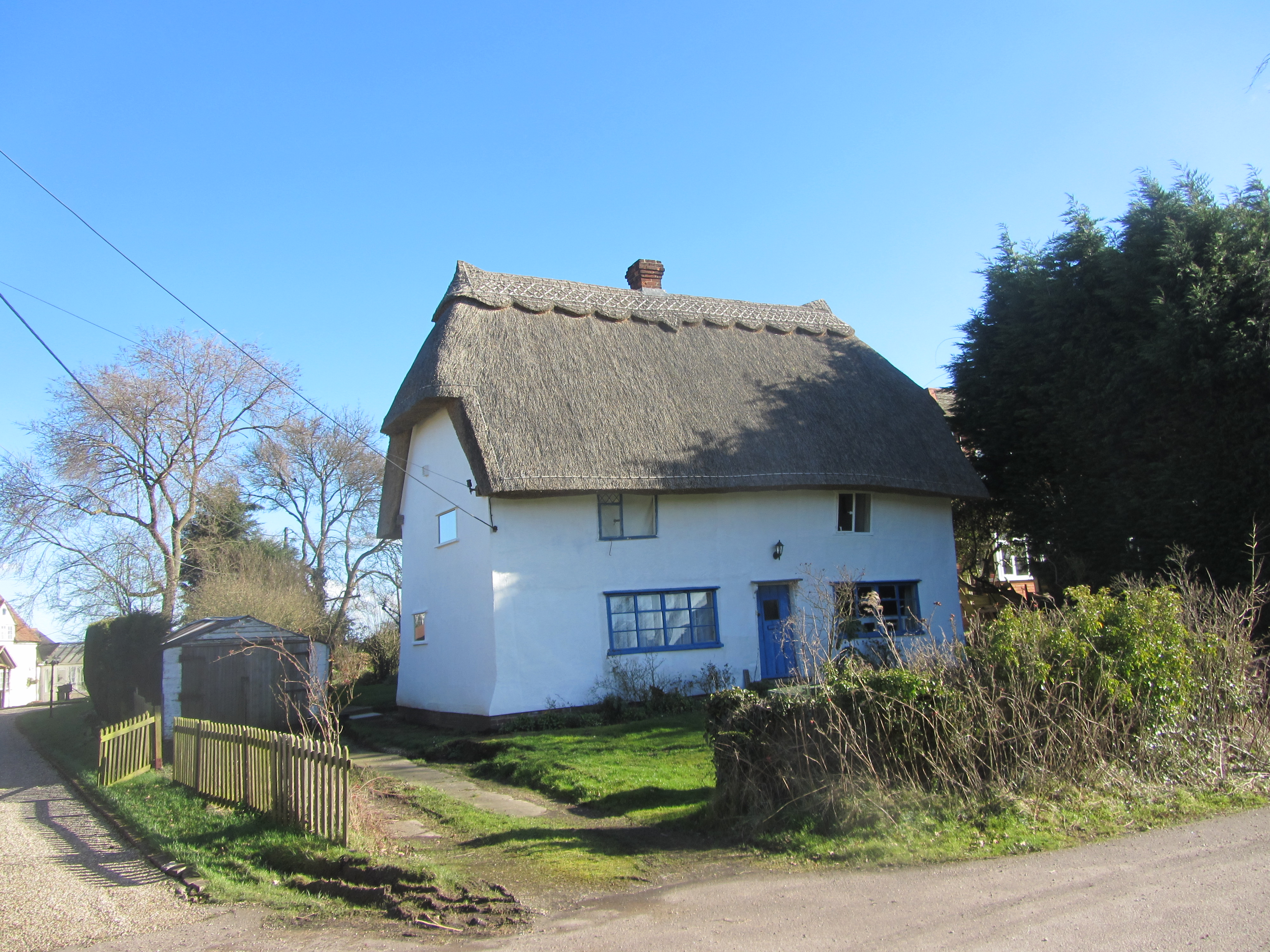
Ford End Little Owls

Among the thatched cottages, which are believed to date back to the late 15th beginning 16th century, is Little Owls, sited close to the church. In the past a Baptist Chapel was sited behind it, which was closed in 1925 and demolished in 1954.
