= Thames Estuary Path =

Footpath in Essex, England

The Thames Estuary Path is a long-distance footpath in Essex, England. The 29-mile (47 km) path leads from Tilbury to Leigh-on-Sea. It is waymarked, but as of 2024 is not named on Ordnance Survey mapping.

== The path ==
The Thames Estuary Path was established in 2014, it is part of the King Charles III England Coast Path and runs along the northern (Essex) side of the Thames estuary. It is promoted by Essex County Council and c2c train company. It complements the Saffron Trail from south-east to north-west Essex.

The path starts at the Tilbury Town railway station (51°27'44"N 0°21'15"E) in the Borough of Thurrock in south-west Essex, and heads in an easterly direction through industrial, urban and rural Essex. It goes along sea walls, beside fresh and salt-water marshes, through fields and pasture as well as industrial, military and built-up areas; it finishes at Leigh-on-Sea railway station (51°32'28"N 0°38'25"E).

The path is waymarked in both directions by a circular blue, yellow and green ‘walker’ graphic marker with the text "Thames Estuary Path".

The path has six railway stations on the route or nearby.

== Route ==
The Thames Estuary Path passes through the following locations:

Tilbury (start), East Tilbury, Mucking, Stanford-le-Hope, Corringham, Fobbing, Vange, Pitsea, Benfleet, Leigh-on-Sea (finish). The highest point of the walk is 19 m (62 feet) at Fobbing; the lowest point is at sea level at several locations.

== Adjoining paths ==
The Thames Estuary Path adjoins several long-distance paths: the King Charles III England Coast Path follows the same route; the Saffron Trail (an 81-mile (130 km) walk from Southend-on-Sea to Saffron Walden) intersects at Leigh-on-Sea. Two stations west of Tilbury Town is Purfleet station which gives access to the 150-mile (240 km) London Outer Orbital Path (LOOP).
