= Howe Street =

Hamlet in Essex, England

Coordinates: 51.807°N 0.457°E

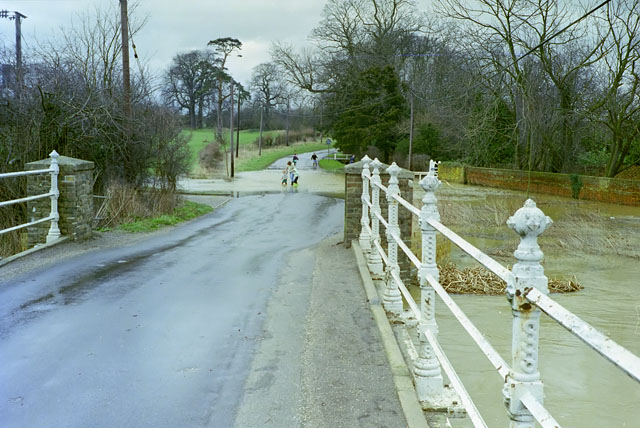
- Parsonage Bridge, Howe Street

- Location within Essex
- Civil parish: Great Waltham
- District: Chelmsford
- Shire county: Essex
- Region: East
- Country: England
- Sovereign state: United Kingdom
- Police: Essex
- Fire: Essex
- Ambulance: East of England
- UK Parliament: Saffron Walden

Howe Street is a rural hamlet on the banks of the River Chelmer. It is situated in the civil parish of Great Waltham, in the Chelmsford district, in the county of Essex, England.

Howe Street is located 6 miles north of Chelmsford city centre. It has a population of around 200, the village post office and shop closed in 2008 and closest nearby shop and schools are located in Great Waltham 1.3 miles away.

Howe Street has a Historic Grade II listed 14th-century Freehouse pub (one of the oldest in Essex) known as The Green Man, which opened 7 November 2016 to the public, after major refurbishment costing £3 million and investment being part of a new venture for renowned Essex born Michelin star chef brothers Chris and Geoff Galvin. It is one of several listed historic buildings in the hamlet many of which are well preserved examples of Early East Anglia Timber Frame construction.

There is also some light industry including an active working farm known as Fitzandrews (part of the Langleys Estate) and several commercial units located at Warners Farm providing local employment.

Howe Street is also known as the birthplace of Milbank Floors established by Geoffrey Milbank in 1947 however no longer based in the village they were located on the site now known as Bridge Croft - a 1980s built housing development.
