= Hatfield Forest =

Nature reserve in England

Coordinates: 51.8577°N 0.2291°E

- Site of Special Scientific Interest
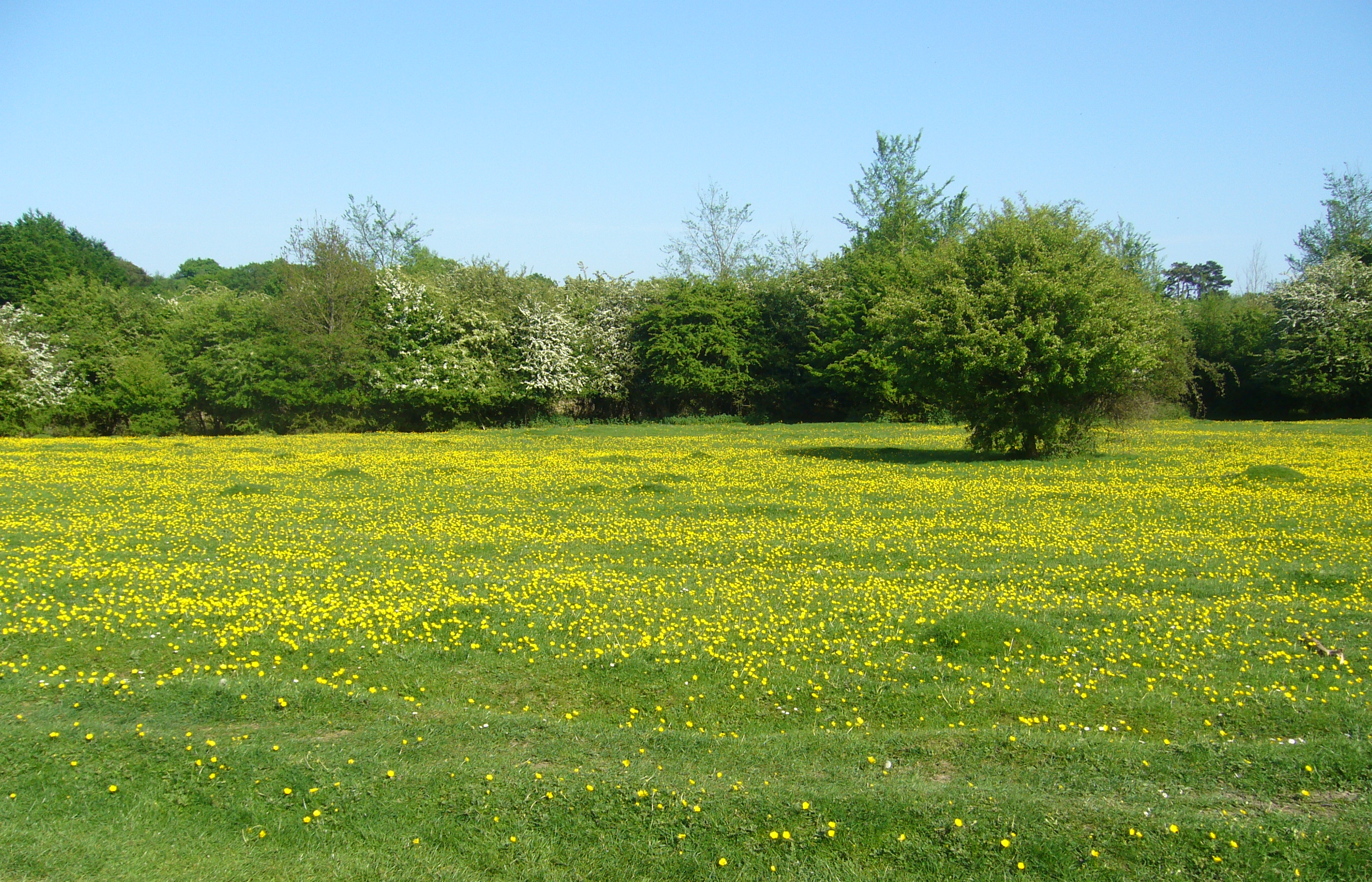
- Location of Hatfield Forest.
- Area of search: Essex
- Grid reference: TL 538202
- Interest: Biological
- Area: 403.2 hectares (996 acres)
- Notification date: 1985
- Location map: Magic Map

Hatfield Forest is a 403.2-hectare (996-acre) biological Site of Special Scientific Interest in Essex, England, 3 mi (4.8 km) east of Bishop's Stortford. It is also a National Nature Reserve and a Nature Conservation Review site. It is owned and managed by the National Trust. A medieval warren in the forest is a Scheduled Monument.

Hatfield is the only remaining intact Royal Hunting Forest and dates from the time of the Norman kings. Other parts of the once extensive Forest of Essex include Epping Forest to the southwest, Hainault Forest to the south and Writtle Forest to the east. Hatfield Forest was established as a Royal hunting forest in the late eleventh century, following the introduction of fallow deer and after Forest Laws were imposed on the area by the king. Deer hunting and chasing was a popular sport for Norman kings and lords, and the word 'forest', in its legal sense, refers to a woodland area for hunting wild game. In the case of Hatfield, the area under Forest Law consisted of woodlands with plains.

In his book about the site, The Last Forest, botanist and rural historian Oliver Rackham argues that "Hatfield is of supreme interest in that all the elements of a medieval Forest survive: deer, cattle, coppice woods, pollards, scrub, timber trees, grassland and fen ... As such it is almost certainly unique in England and possibly in the world ... The Forest owes very little to the last 250 years ... Hatfield is the only place where one can step back into the Middle Ages to see, with only a small effort of the imagination, what a Forest looked like in use."

== History ==
There is no written record of exactly when Hatfield was established as a Royal Forest, but records suggest it was sometime between 1086 and 1225. In 1238 Henry III (while retaining hunting rights) gave the land and trees to Isobel of Huntingdon, daughter of the Earl of Chester. She married into the Bruce family and the Forest remained in their hands until Robert the Bruce had his English lands confiscated by Edward I in 1306. On his death it was given by Edward II to the de Bohun family. The right to venison stayed with the King, but the rights to the wood and soil belonged to the de Bohuns, until 1446 when the family was given the right to the deer as well, shortly after they had been awarded the Dukedom of Buckingham. In 1521, however, the third Duke, Edward Stafford was beheaded by Henry VIII and the Forest reverted to the Crown. After Henry's death, Edward VI granted the forest to Sir Richard Rich.

In 1592 the Rich family sold their interest in the forest to Lord Morley and in 1612 sold the rest of their Hatfield estate, including the lordship of the manor to Sir Francis Barrington. This resulted in a succession of disputes over ownership and rights in the forest for the next 200 years. In 1729 it was purchased by the Houblon family. They were a wealthy family, originally from Lille, and included John Houblon who had been the first Governor of the Bank of England in 1694. While leaving the traditional woodland management techniques little changed, the Houblons probably sought the help of Capability Brown. As a result, the lake was created and exotic trees planted (i.e. trees not native to Essex). A picnic house was constructed overlooking the lake, and in 1759 it was decorated using British and tropical shells by 17-year-old Laetitia Houblon (1742–1828); this Shell House can still be visited today. The forest remained in the hands of the Houblon family until 1923, when Edward North Buxton bought the Forest from his deathbed and gave it to the National Trust.

== Air crashes ==
On 20 October 1987, a Cessna 421B Golden Eagle (G-HAST) owned by Hastingwood Hotels Ltd crashed into the forest after taking off from London Stansted Airport. The pilot and five passengers died.

On 22 December 1999, Korean Air Cargo Flight 8509 crashed just outside the forest after taking off from London Stansted Airport. The plane, a Boeing 747-200F, narrowly missed striking houses in the area. All four crew members on board died on impact.

== Woodland management ==
Hatfield Forest contained woodland long before it became a royal forest. This has been managed by coppicing (where trees are cut down to ground level) and pollarding in the plains (where trees are cut above the browse (or grazing) height of deer or cattle). In the case of coppicing, the regrowth has to be protected from browsing or grazing animals by fencing, ditches and banks. There were a number of uses for the cut wood, including firewood, fences, thatching spars, furniture and flood defences. The methods used remained unchanged for centuries and are described by Thomas Hardy in The Woodlanders. Some trees, rather than being coppiced, were left to grow and become 'standards' to be used as timber for buildings and ships. These systems of woodland management is still carried on in the Forest today and can be readily seen by visitors.

== Archaeology ==
Hatfield Forest has not been ploughed and as a result there are many archaeological remains. The principal ones are Portingbury Rings (or Hills) and the warren area.

At Portingbury Hills, finds dating to the Iron Age included a small flint blade, four pot shards, animal bones, burnt flint and charcoal. The earthworks at Portingbury may date back to the Iron Age. However the ditches are of a size more commonly found in medieval moats. The current earthworks may be the result of overbuilding over time.

The Warren was created for rabbits in an area of existing mounds. Warren Cottage was built for the warrener and the Forest Lodge for the head woodsman. Later remains are the Victorian fence columns. These were erected around 1857 when the Forest was enclosed. Some columns survived the 1930s, when many were sold, and sections of fencing have been recreated by the Shell House car park and in Gravel Pit Coppice, near the Lake. Parts of the Forest were used during World War II to conceal the storage of munitions for the airfield at Stansted. The remains of the huts that were constructed at this time can be seen alongside the entry and exit roads.

== Ecological significance ==
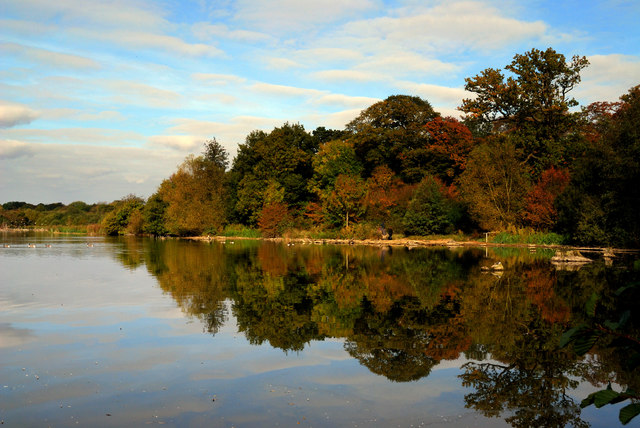
The lake

The ecology of the Forest is in pristine condition. It is one of largest areas of land in Essex which has not been ploughed. There is a wide range of habitats (including coppice woodland, wood pasture, scrub, grassy plains, marsh and lake) for both animals and plants.

== Wildlife ==
Given the wide range of unspoilt habitats in the Forest, it is not surprising that it has much wildlife, both plant and animal. Amongst mammals to be seen at the Forest are fallow deer, muntjac deer, fox, grey squirrel, rabbit, weasel and hedgehog. There are badger setts, but badgers, being nocturnal are rarely seen. Two herds of Red Poll cattle graze the plains in the traditional manner. Sheep are used as 'conservation grazers' for areas that have been cleared of scrub. The breeds being used are Speckled Faced Beulah, Wiltshire Horn and Manx Loaghtan.

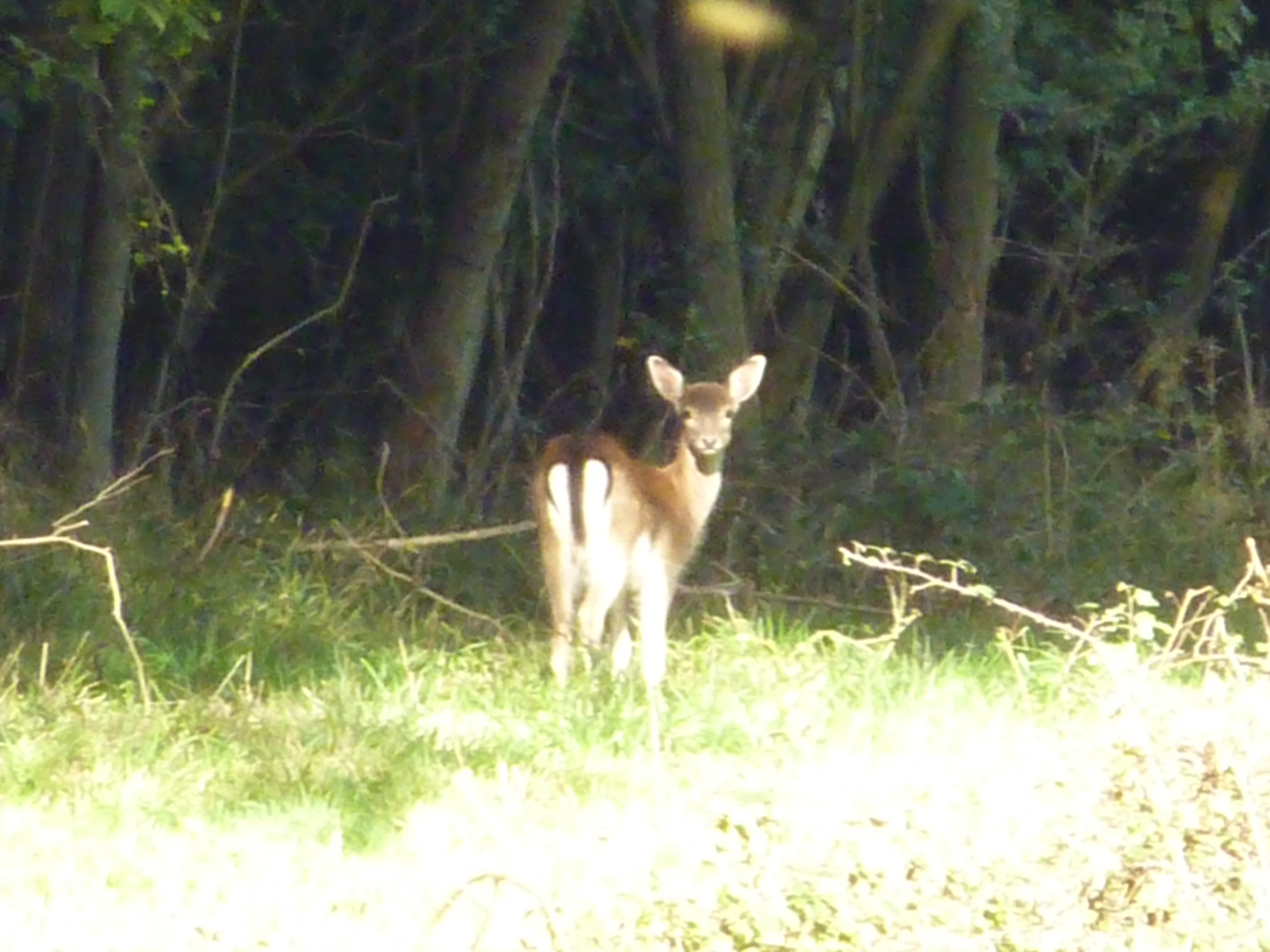
Fallow deer at Hatfield Forest

A count in May 2008 found 58 different species of birds, attracted by the various habitats. Woodland birds include jay, green woodpecker, great spotted woodpecker, carrion crow, blue tit, great tit, chaffinch, nightingale, kestrel and bullfinch. Around the lake, depending on the time of year, are greylag geese, Canada geese, mute swan, great crested grebe, common tern, moorhen, coot, occasional kingfisher, cormorant, and grey heron, with swallows and house martins skimming the water. Buzzards can increasingly be seen above the Forest.

Ten species of bats are found in the Forest, with dusk the best time for sightings.

Hatfield Forest is especially important for its invertebrates, especially those associated with decaying wood. Of particular significance are the saproxylic beetles and the site is in the top 10 in the UK for these specialised fauna.

Trees are found in abundance, with the main species being oak, ash, hornbeam, hawthorn, hazel and field maple. There are over 800 ancient trees in the wood pasture areas, some of which are over 1,200 years old, and of especial note are the huge pollarded oaks and hornbeams. Mistletoe grows in profusion, especially on the old hawthorn scrub. The most famous tree in the Forest was the Doodle Oak, which was one of the largest trees ever to grow in England. It last bore green leaves in 1858 and its site is marked in the north of the Forest.

A total of over 400 plant species have been found in the Forest. Some of the more common ones are: white clover, common spotted orchid, selfheal, sheep's sorrel, herb robert, bugle, agrimony, bee orchid, perforate St John's wort, common field speedwell, and bird's foot trefoil. The forest also has extensive fields of buttercups during late May and early June.

== Facilities ==
There are many miles of walks within Hatfield Forest, which is crossed by several rights of way, and is open at all times to those on foot. A car park at the entrance is open from 9am on Wednesdays to Sundays until 2.30pm.Hatfield Forest is closed to cars (entrance gate is locked) on Mondays and Tuesdays from October to March inclusive.

Two boardwalks improve accessibility for visitors, especially those with buggies. One goes to the Lake and the facilities in the Lake Area, while the other is a sensory trail, which helps those who are visually impaired to understand and enjoy the Forest. Horse riding and fishing are allowed subject to permits being obtained.

Hatfield Forest is one of the three forests of west Essex alluded to in the Three Forests Way. This is a 59-mile (95 km) long-distance circular path which passes through Hainault Forest, Epping Forest and Hatfield Forest. The Forest Way, Essex is a 25-mile (40 km) long-distance footpath which runs from Loughton via Epping Forest to Hatfield Forest.

== See also ==
- List of Sites of Special Scientific Interest in Essex
- List of National Trust properties in England
- List of ancient woods in England
