= Essex Way =

81-mile footpath in Essex, England

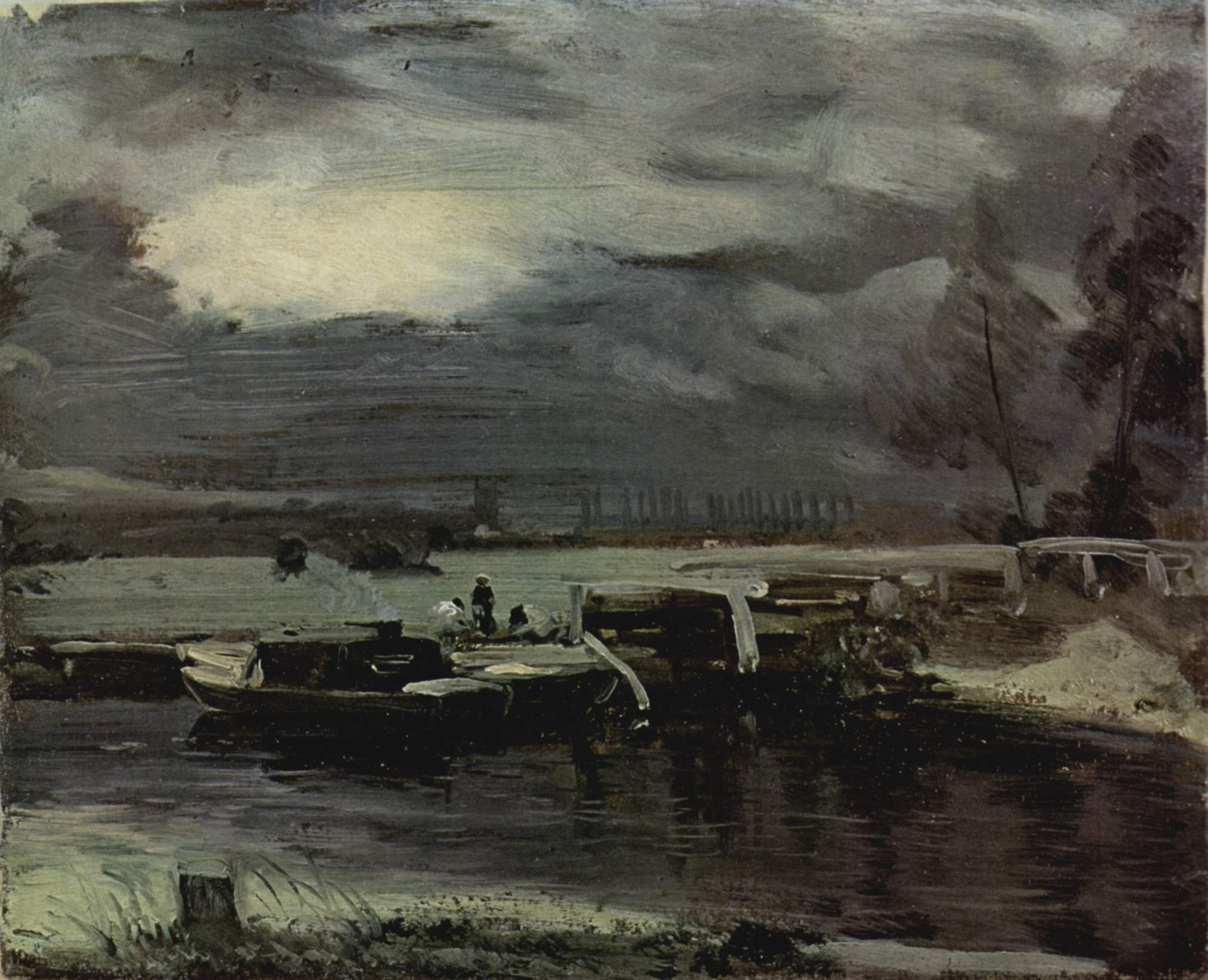
- Boats on the East Anglian Stour with the church of Dedham in the background, John Constable, c. 1811. This view lies near the Way.
- Length: 130 km (81 mi)
- Location: Essex, England
- Designation: UK National Trail
- Trailheads: Epping; 51.6931°N 0.1151°E; Harwich; 51.9443°N 1.2889°E
- Use: Hiking, Trail running

The Essex Way is a waymarked long-distance footpath 81 miles (130 km) long, along footpaths and roads in Essex, England.

The trail starts in Epping in the southwest, crosses Dedham Vale and Constable country to finish at the port of Harwich on the Stour estuary.

It leads through ancient woodlands, open farmland, tree-lined river valleys and leafy green lanes, unveiling historic towns and villages along the way.

The route is waymarked by Essex Way plaques and direction arrows. The original CPRE signs were dark green, but most of these have now been replaced with Essex County Council plaques depicting two poppies on a white background. These are attached to fingerposts, stiles, gates, footbridges and posts. The waymarks, together with the maps in the guidebook, make the walk easy to follow. The guidebook illustrates points of interest along the way and includes an accommodation guide for the whole route.

== History ==
The Essex Way was conceived as a result of a competition organised by the CPRE in 1972.

== Adjoining paths ==
The Essex Way crosses several other long-distance footpaths including St Peter's Way (a 45-mile/72 km walk from Chipping Ongar to Bradwell-on-Sea), the Three Forests Way (a 60-mile/97 km circular walk linking Epping, Hatfield and Hainault forests), the Saffron Trail (a 71-mile/114 km walk from Southend-on-Sea to Saffron Walden), the John Ray Walk (a 9-mile/14.5 km walk from Braintree to Witham), and the Essex Clayway (a 28-mile/45 km route linking the Essex Way at Coggeshall to St Peter's Way at Mundon).

== Transport ==
The Essex Way is well served by public transport, especially by train services.

== Maps ==
Ordnance Survey 1:25,000 "Explorer Maps": Epping Forest & Lee Valley No. 174, Chelmsford and The Rodings No.183, Braintree and Saffron Waldon No.195, Sudbury, Hadleigh.
