= Thorington =

Village in Suffolk, England

Coordinates: 52.3125°N 1.5490°E

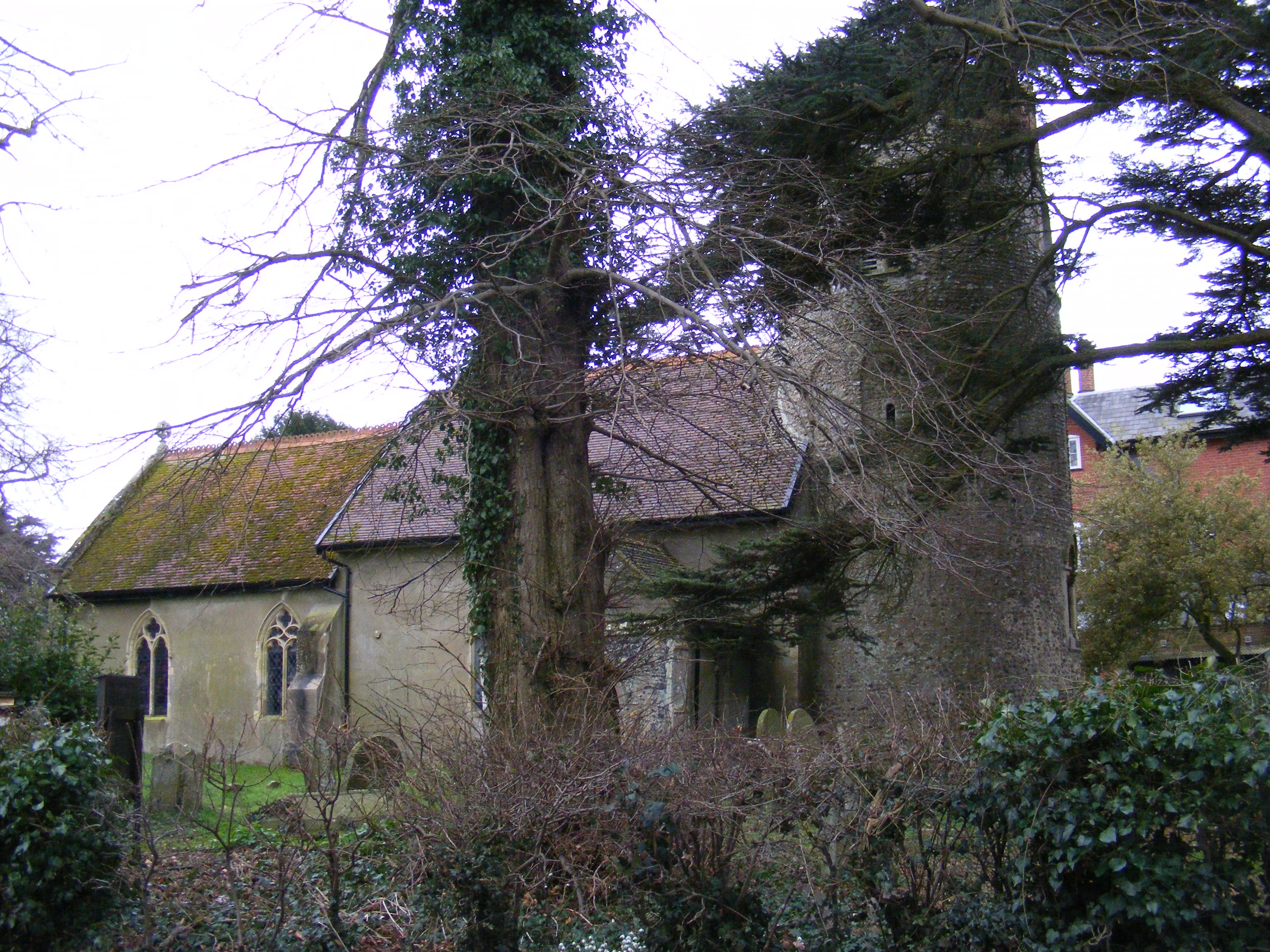
- Church of St Peter

- Location within Suffolk
- Population: 76 (2001 census)
- Civil parish: Thorington
- District: East Suffolk
- Shire county: Suffolk
- Region: East
- Country: England
- Sovereign state: United Kingdom
- Post town: HALESWORTH
- Postcode district: IP19
- Dialling code: 01502
- Police: Suffolk
- Fire: Suffolk
- Ambulance: East of England

Thorington is a village and civil parish in the East Suffolk district of the English county of Suffolk. It is located around 3 miles (4.8 km) south-east of the town of Halesworth, immediately south of the village of Wenhaston. The A12 main road runs through the parish to the east of the village. In 2001 the parish had a population of 76. Thorington Hall was demolished in 1949, but The Round House, a listed gamekeeper's lodge for the Thorington Estate, survives. From 1974 to 2019 it was in Suffolk Coastal district. It was in the hundred of Blything.

== Church Farm Nature Reserve ==
Church Farm Marshes is a nature reserve located in the parish. It consists of an area of meadow and marshland 31 hectares (77 acres) in size along a tributary of the River Blyth. The reserve is owned and managed by Suffolk Wildlife Trust and is designated as a County Wildlife Site.
