= Darsham Marshes =

Nature reserve in Suffolk, England

Coordinates: 52.268°N 1.545°E

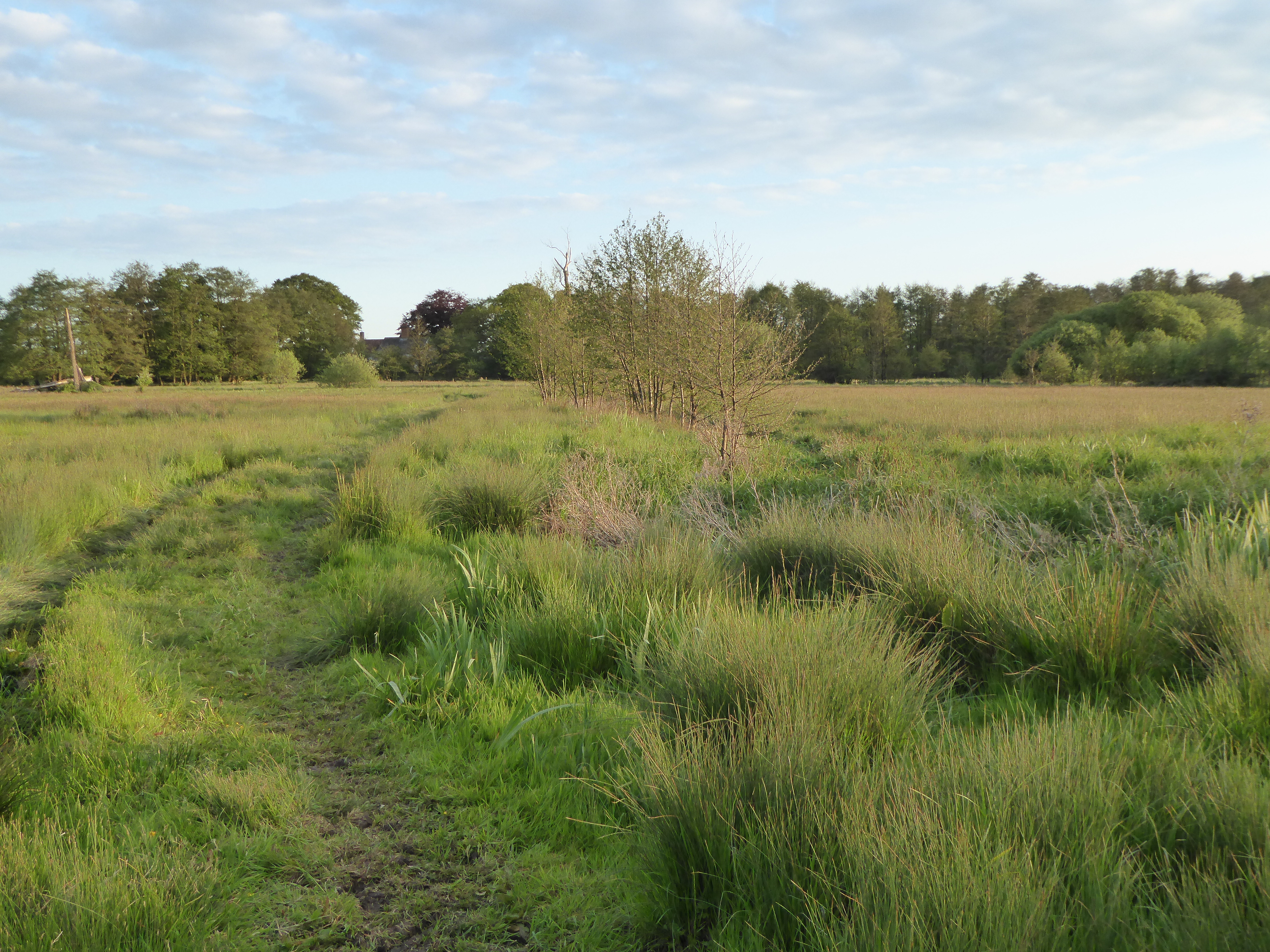
- Interactive map of Darsham Marshes
- Type: Nature reserve
- Location: Darsham, Suffolk
- OS grid: TM420692
- Area: 20 hectares (49 acres)
- Manager: Suffolk Wildlife Trust

Darsham Marshes is a 20 hectare nature reserve south of Darsham in Suffolk, England. It is owned and managed by the Suffolk Wildlife Trust.

This marsh and fen site has two ponds and a network of dykes. The wildlife is diverse and flowering plants include ragged-robin, yellow flag, marsh marigold and southern marsh orchid. There are birds such as marsh harriers and hen harriers, and mammals including otters and water voles.

There is access from Westleton Road.
