= Hutchison's Meadow =

Nature reserve in Suffolk, England

Coordinates: 52.103°N 1.328°E

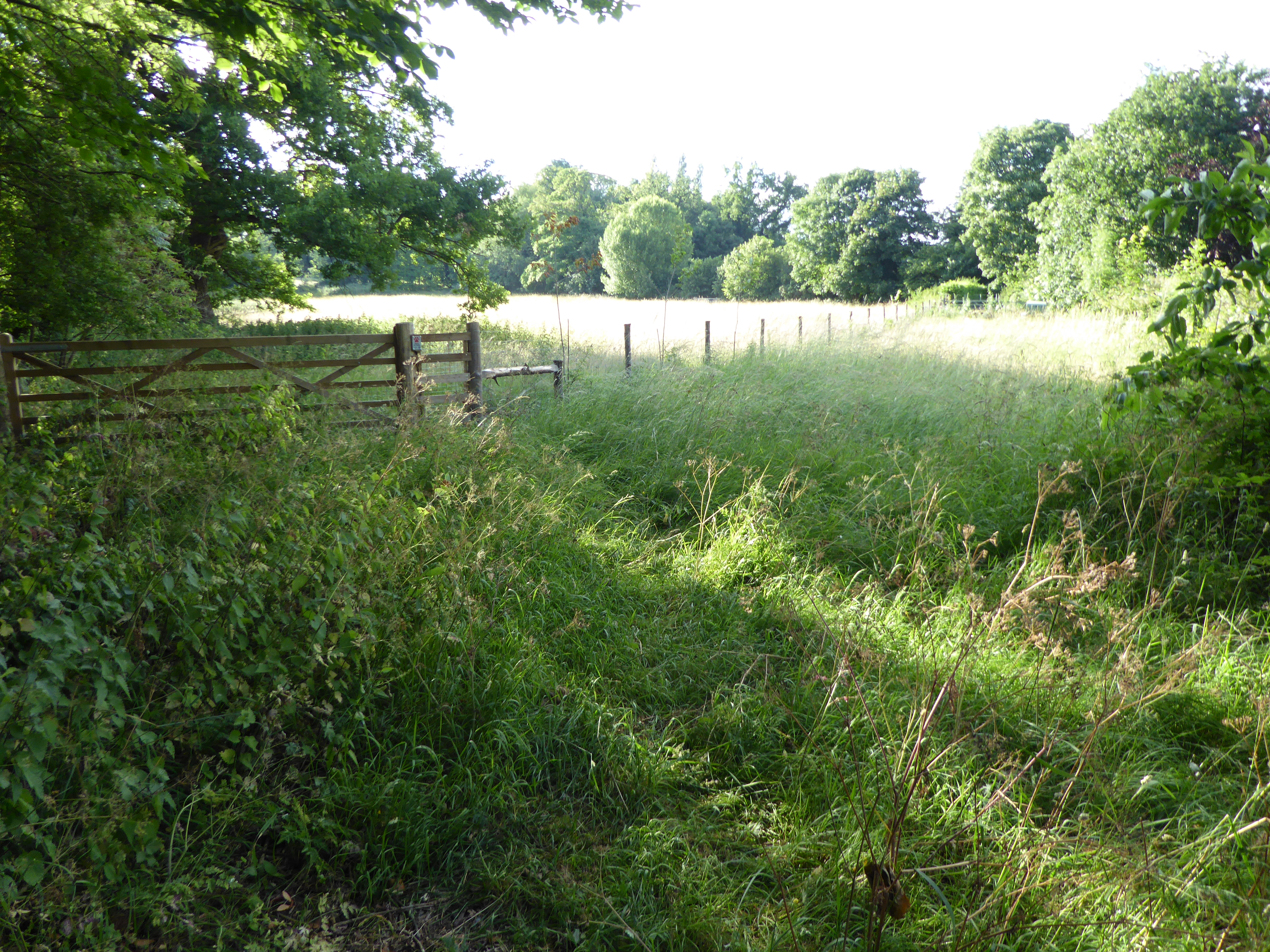
- Interactive map of Hutchison's Meadow
- Type: Nature reserve
- Location: Melton, Suffolk
- Area: 1 hectare (2.5 acres)
- Manager: Suffolk Wildlife Trust

Hutchison's Meadow is a one hectare nature reserve in Melton in Suffolk. It is owned and managed by the Suffolk Wildlife Trust.

This is mixture of wet and dry grassland. It has diverse flowering plants such as southern marsh orchid, common fleabane and ragged robin in wet areas, and yellow rattle and bulbous buttercup in drier ones.

There is no public access to the site.
