= Fakenham Magna =

Village in Suffolk, England

Coordinates: 52.354°N 0.805°E

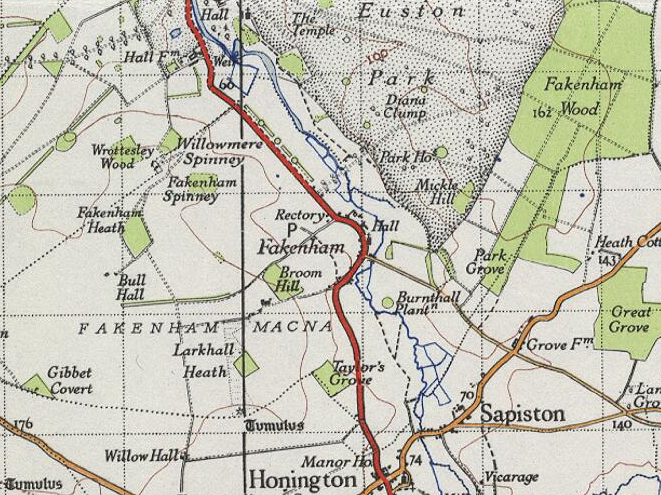
- A 1945 map of Fakenham Magna

- Location within Suffolk
- Population: 152 (2001); 167 (2011)
- Civil parish: Fakenham Magna
- District: West Suffolk
- Shire county: Suffolk
- Region: East
- Country: England
- Sovereign state: United Kingdom
- Post town: Thetford
- Postcode district: IP24
- Dialling code: 01359
- Police: Suffolk
- Fire: Suffolk
- Ambulance: East of England
- UK Parliament: West Suffolk

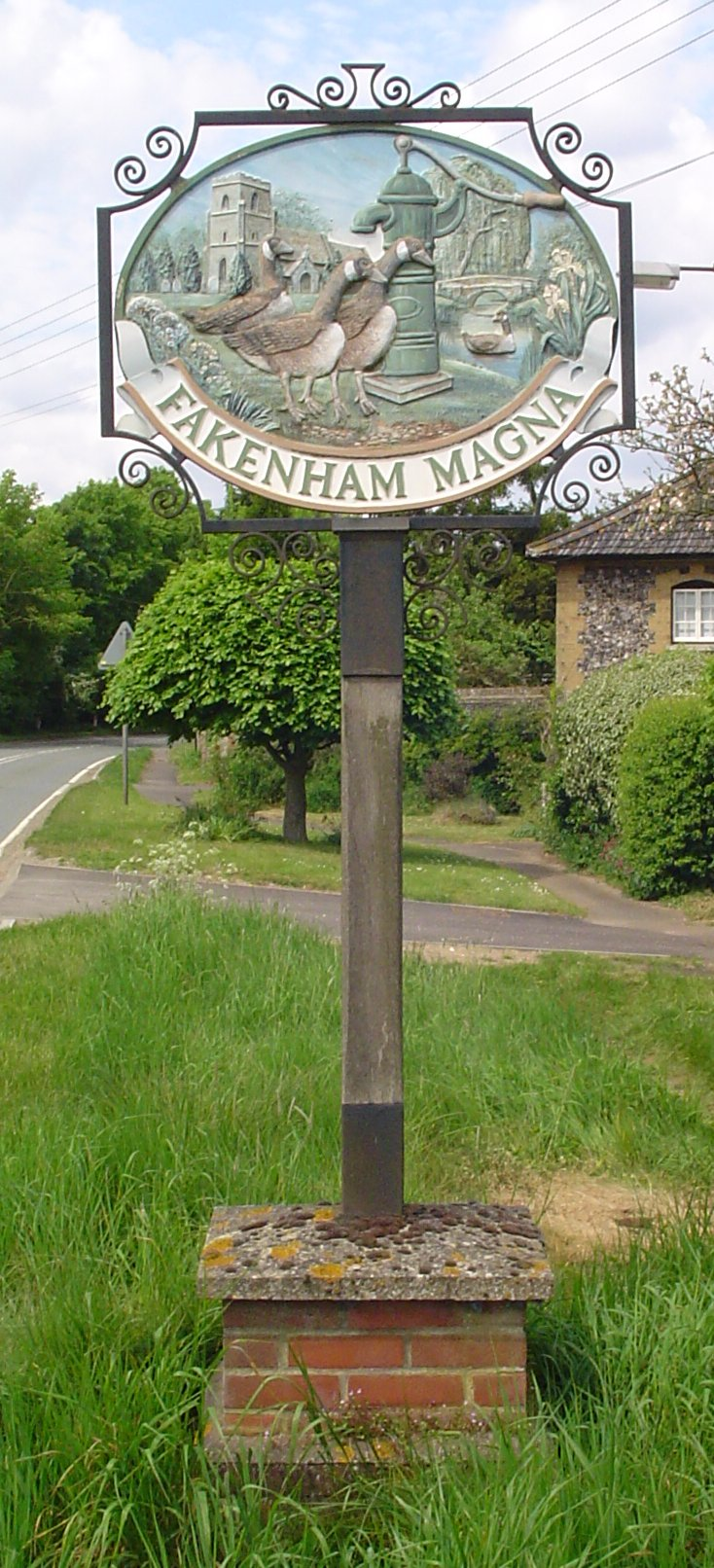
Village sign of Fakenham Magna

Fakenham Magna (or Great Fakenham) is a village and civil parish in the West Suffolk district of Suffolk in eastern England. The meaning of the word Fakenham can be split into two: 'Faken' and 'ham', both of which derive from Old English. The former refers to somebody by the name of 'Facca', with the latter meaning 'a village / a homestead', making the direct translation 'Facca's homestead'. Magna translates from Latin as 'great', hence the alternative name of the village of 'Great Fakenham'. During World War Two, however, the village was referred to as 'Little Fakenham', which was used to avoid confusion with the larger civil parish of Fakenham in Norfolk.

Located on the A1088 road around eight miles north-east of Bury St Edmunds and four miles south-east of Thetford, in 2011 its population was 167. The village lacks nearly all basic amenities (such as a shop, a school and a doctor's surgery), with the main features being the Church of St Peter, and the Wildwood Gallery. A small river, the Blackbourne, runs along the east of the village. The RAF Honington airfield covers much of the western part of the parish. A poem, "The Fakenham Ghost", was set in Fakenham Magna - written by the poet Robert Bloomfield who was born in the nearby village of Honington.

In the 1870s, Fakenham Magna was described as "a parish in the district of Thetford and county of Suffolk; on the river Brandon, 5 3/4 miles (9.3 km) SSE of Thetford r. station".

== History ==
Lithic flakes in river terrace deposits found near the village may represent some of the oldest evidence for archaic human occupation of Britain, suggested to date to Marine Isotope Stage 19, around 800,000 years ago.

Some of the earliest evidence of modern human activity in the civil parish of Fakenham Magna has been discovered archaeologically, from the Neolithic period, in the form of leaf shaped arrowheads as well as a variety of axes. However, the earliest document recording Fakenham Magna is the Domesday Book, in the form of two entries from 1066 and 1086. There are noticeable differences between the two, such as with the agriculture of the village. There is a reduction in the amount of livestock in the 20 year timespan, with four cobs and 40 pigs in 1066 decreasing to three cobs and 20 pigs by 1086. The amount of cattle and sheep remain the same, at 12 and 300. The meadowland also suffers a reduction, from 20 acres of meadow in 1066 to just four in 1086. Despite this reduction, agriculture became the most dominant occupation for males in Fakenham Magna, with two out of three employed in this sector by 1881. Another significant change in the village is that in 1066 it was documented that there was a mill and two churches, however today there are no recorded mills and only one of these churches remains.

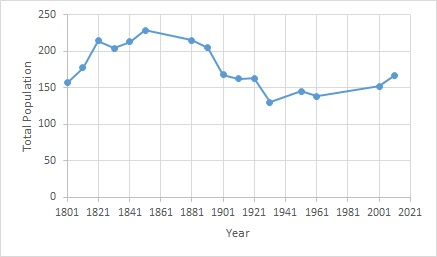
Population time series of Fakenham Magna 1801-2011

== Population ==
According to the 2011 Census, there were 74 males and 93 females living in the parish. The total population graph for Fakenham Magna shows that there has been a fluctuation in numbers since 1801, however the 2011 Census illustrates that there has been an increase of only ten people since the first recorded Census. The population had its peak in 1851 where it reached 229 people, but this was followed by a gradual decline until 1931 where the total population was reduced to just 130. The numbers have been gradually growing since (with the exception of 1961) ultimately leading to the most recently recorded population of 167.

== Occupational Structure ==
Occupational structure of Fakenham Magna in 1881

The occupational structure of Fakenham Magna in 1881 illustrates a clear variation in specific job categories depending on the gender of the worker. It is shown that the vast majority of male workers were engaged in agriculture, in particular as agricultural labourers, farm servants or cottagers. There is a relationship between this occupation and the surrounding environment, as Fakenham Magna is situated predominantly around farms and fields, making agriculture the most practical line of work. There is a gender inequality in terms of who was working in agriculture, as only two women were employed in this field, which is most likely due to the reliance on male workers to engage in more manual jobs in comparison to women who were more likely to stay at home. This is supported by the chart, as two-thirds of the women are in unknown or illegible occupations. The second most common occupation for women is that of domestic services (perhaps as maids or nannies) with all ten being domestic indoor servants.

The 2011 Census, however, shows a clear reduction of the gender inequality in occupational structure from 1881. Of the 46 female workers in the village, 24 are in professional or secretarial occupations, making up 52% of the entire female workforce. This is a strong contrast to the structure in 1881, where 92% of the female working population were employed as domestic servants or were in unknown or unspecified occupations. The change in occupational structure is perhaps as a result of the improvement of women's rights over time, meaning that they are able to enter the public sphere which traditionally only consisted of men. The 1881 dominance of agriculture by the male workers also experienced a shift by 2011, with 22 of the 46 working men (48%) now being employed in managerial, professional or associate professional roles, and only 4 working in agriculture. This again shows a significant change in gender roles as males were now not just expected to engage in physical work, and instead began to focus on non-manual employment.

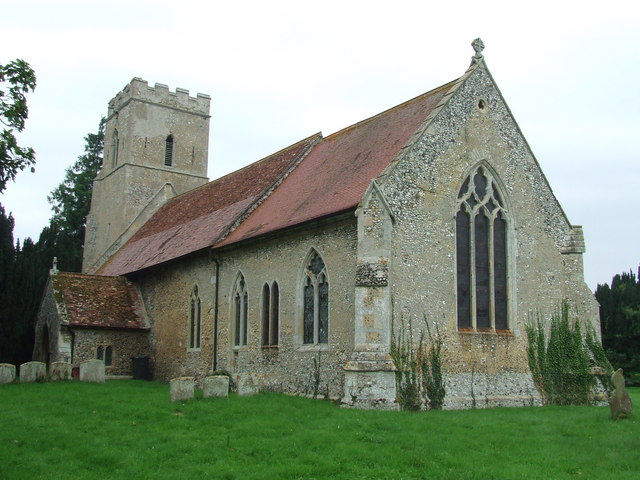
The Church of St Peter in Fakenham Magna

== Church of St. Peter ==
The Church of St. Peter within Fakenham Magna is one of the few buildings in the village which serves a purpose other than housing, and is located in the centre of the village. The structure dates back to pre-10th century, "the oldest part of the present structure has pre Norman conquest quoins in the north and south nave walls and the bulk of the nave is from the 14th century as is the tower". Despite surviving for over ten centuries, the exterior of the church fell into a state of disrepair, being described in 2016 as "neglected, probably disused, and... locked without a keyholder notice". However, there was an internal restoration project carried out in the 19th century which successfully allowed it to still be in use to this day, with services such as Holy Communion and Songs of Praise still taking place.
