= Church Farm Marshes =

Nature reserve in Suffolk, England

Coordinates: 52.31°N 1.55°E

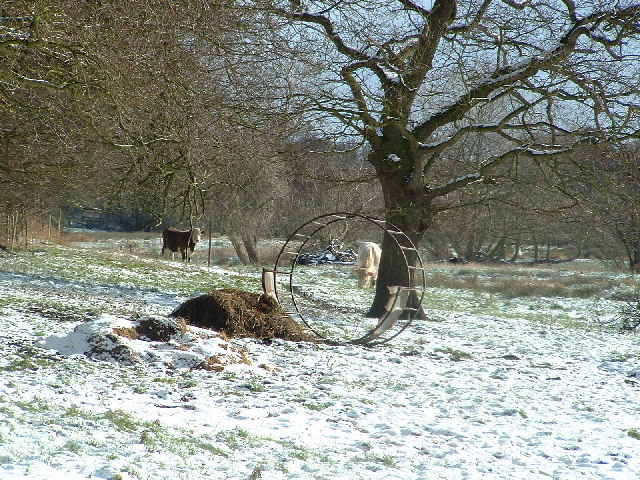
- Interactive map of Church Farm Marshes
- Type: Nature reserve
- Location: Thorington, Suffolk
- OS grid: TM420742
- Area: 56 hectares (140 acres)
- Manager: Suffolk Wildlife Trust

Church Farm Marshes is a 56 hectare nature reserve in Thorington in Suffolk. It is managed by the Suffolk Wildlife Trust.

This site has areas of marshland, wet and dry woodland, and grassland. The flower-rich marshes have southern marsh orchid, marsh marigold and ragged robin. Grazing maintains diversity of flora in the meadows and marshes, ensuring a good population of insects which provide food for birds.

There is access to the reserve from Thorington Road near the church.
