= Sizewell Belts =

Nature reserve in Suffolk, England

Coordinates: 52.22°N 1.61°E

Sizewell Marshes
- Site of Special Scientific Interest
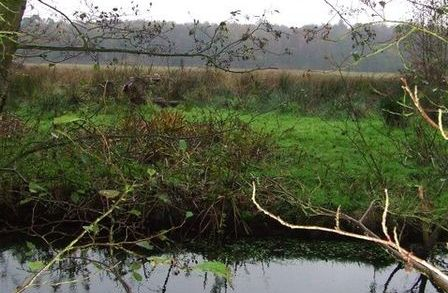
- Location of Sizewell Marshes.
- Area of search: Suffolk
- Grid reference: TM 465 638
- Interest: Biological
- Area: 105.4 hectares
- Notification date: 1992
- Location map: Magic Map

Sizewell Marshes form a 260-acre (105.4 ha) biological Site of Special Scientific Interest adjacent to Sizewell in Suffolk. It is in the Suffolk Coast and Heaths Area of Outstanding Natural Beauty, and is part of a 356-acre (144-ha) nature reserve managed by the Suffolk Wildlife Trust as Sizewell Belts.

These unimproved wet meadows are designated by Natural England as important for their outstanding assemblages of invertebrates, with many nationally rare and scarce species, and of national significance for their assemblage of breeding birds typical of wet grassland. The aquatic flora are diverse, including the nationally scarce soft hornwort and fen pondweed.
