= Norah Hanbury-Kelk Meadows =

Suffolk Wildlife Trust nature reserve

Coordinates: 52.337°N 0.513°E

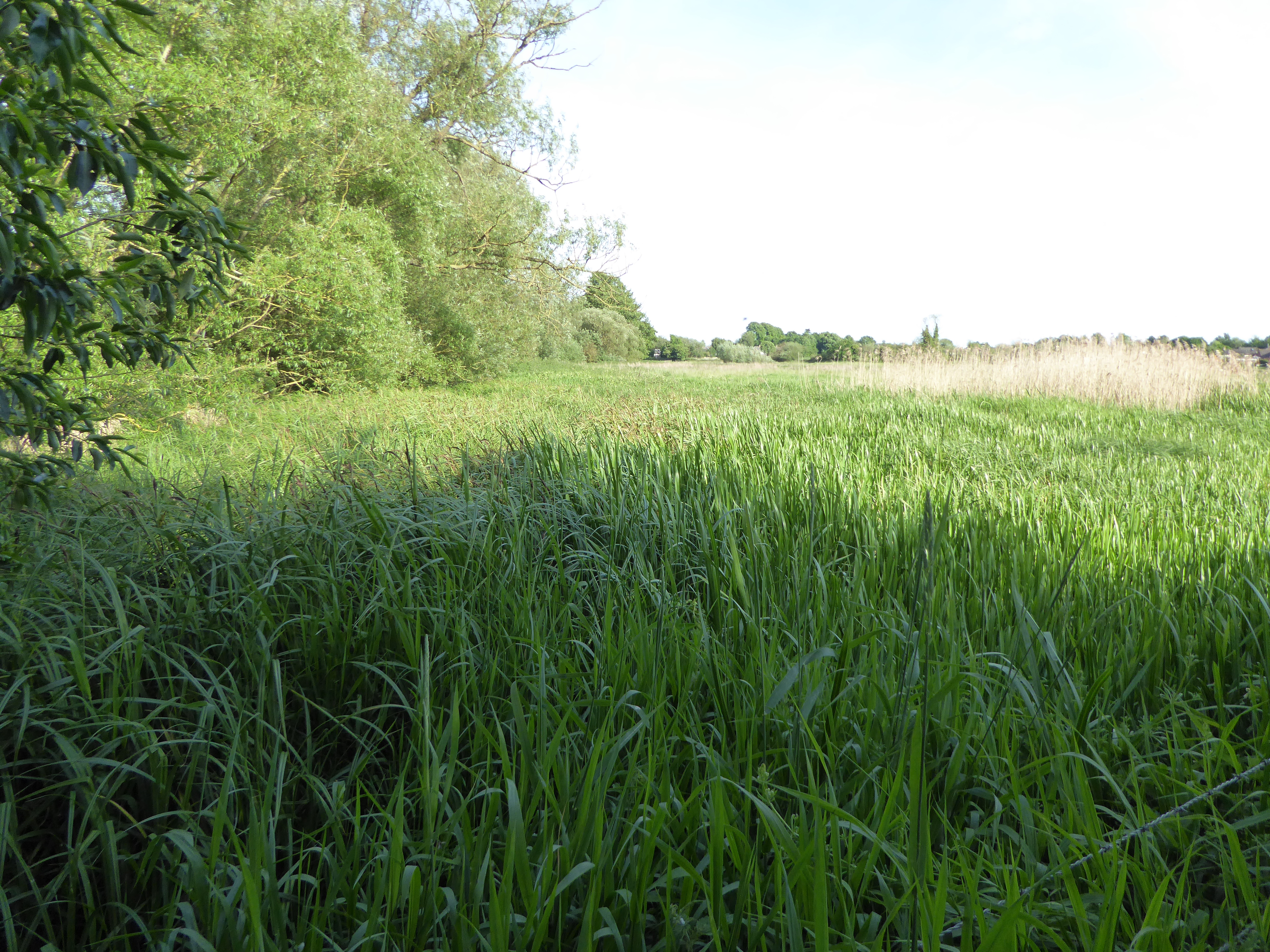
- Interactive map of Norah Hanbury-Kelk Meadows
- Type: Nature reserve
- Location: Barton Mills, Suffolk
- OS grid: TL 713740
- Area: 8 hectares (20 acres)
- Manager: Suffolk Wildlife Trust

Norah Hanbury-Kelk Meadows is an eight hectare nature reserve in Barton Mills in Suffolk. It is managed by the Suffolk Wildlife Trust.

These wet meadows and dykes have diverse flora, such as southern marsh orchids, lady's smock, early marsh orchid and greater bird's foot trefoil. Birds include snipe and ducks.

There is access by a footpath next to a bridge over the River Lark.
