= County Wildlife Site =

Conservation designation in the UK

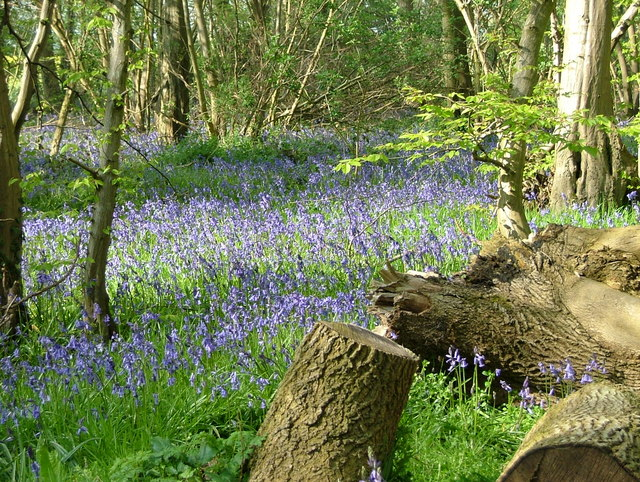
Bluebells (Hyacinthoides non-scripta) in Reydon Wood, an example of a County Wildlife Site

County Wildlife Site (often abbreviated to CWS) is a conservation designation in the United Kingdom, which despite conferring no statutory protection onto a site, does affirm a site's importance and value for wildlife in its county context. The designation is classified by Natural England (the non-departmental public body of the UK government responsible for ensuring that England's natural environment is protected) as being a 'Local Site' designation, though sites can also be of a regional and national importance. Whilst the exact details of the selection process differ from county to county, in general local Wildlife Trusts, local authorities and other local wildlife/environmental/conservation groups collaborate to select and designate sites. Species in County Wildlife Sites are often also in that county's or the United Kingdom's national Biodiversity Action Plan.

At least 40,000 sites have been established across Britain. These sites generally complement statutory protection provided by Sites of Special Scientific Interest by acting as buffer zones, wildlife corridors and raising the profile of specific wildlife sites. They are also seen as providing protection for species which would not otherwise be protected by law in the United Kingdom. They are seen as important sites for "monitoring the health of the natural environment" by central and local government bodies.

Whilst there is no legislative protection provided by a County Wildlife Site designation, planning permission for work that would have an injurious or adverse effect on sites is usually not granted. An affirmation of the importance of County Wildlife Sites – and indeed all other sites with a designation in the 'Local Sites' category – can be found in Circular 06/05: Biodiversity and Geological Conservation – Statutory Obligations and Their Impact Within The Planning System, and their role in helping the UK to meet national biodiversity objectives was recognised in Planning Policy Statement Nine. The latter affirmation of their importance in biodiversity conservation resulted in a strengthening of the presumption against development on County Wildlife Sites following the Natural Environment and Rural Communities Act 2006, which requires public bodies to 'have a regard for the conservation of biodiversity'. Despite any mandatory legal requirement to do so, positive management of County Wildlife Sites to enhance their value for wildlife is encouraged, and many local Wildlife Trusts and other conservation organisations provide resources to help site owners maximise their site's potential. For example, Suffolk Wildlife Trust offers 'advisory visits' to give guidance to site owners about the kind of conservation work they should be undertaking, whilst the Wildlife Trust for Bedfordshire, Cambridgeshire and Northamptonshire regularly surveys and undertakes volunteer work on County Wildlife Sites.

== See also ==
- Site of Nature Conservation Interest, another conservation designation in the 'Local Sites' category
- Conservation in the United Kingdom
