= Trimley Marshes =

Nature reserve in Suffolk, England

Coordinates: 51.97°N 1.29°E

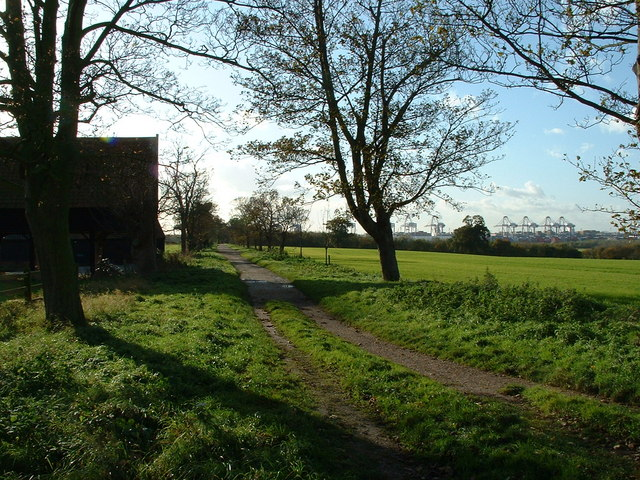
- Interactive map of Trimley Marshes
- Type: Nature reserve
- Location: Trimley St Mary, Suffolk
- OS grid: TM 262 355
- Area: 77 hectares (190 acres)
- Manager: Suffolk Wildlife Trust

Trimley Marshes is a 77 hectare nature reserve west of Trimley St Mary, on the outskirts of Felixstowe in Suffolk. It is managed by the Suffolk Wildlife Trust. It is in the Suffolk Coast and Heaths Area of Outstanding Natural Beauty, the Orwell Estuary Site of Special Scientific Interest, the Stour and Orwell Estuaries Ramsar site internationally important wetland site and Special Protection Area under the European Union Directive on the Conservation of Wild Birds.

This site has a reservoir, islands, reedbeds and marshes. It has a rich variety and number of birds, such as redshankss, avocets, oystercatchers, little grebes and gadwalls.

There is access to the site from Cordy's Lane.
