= Bromeswell Green =

Nature reserve in Suffolk, England

Coordinates: 52.105°N 1.351°E

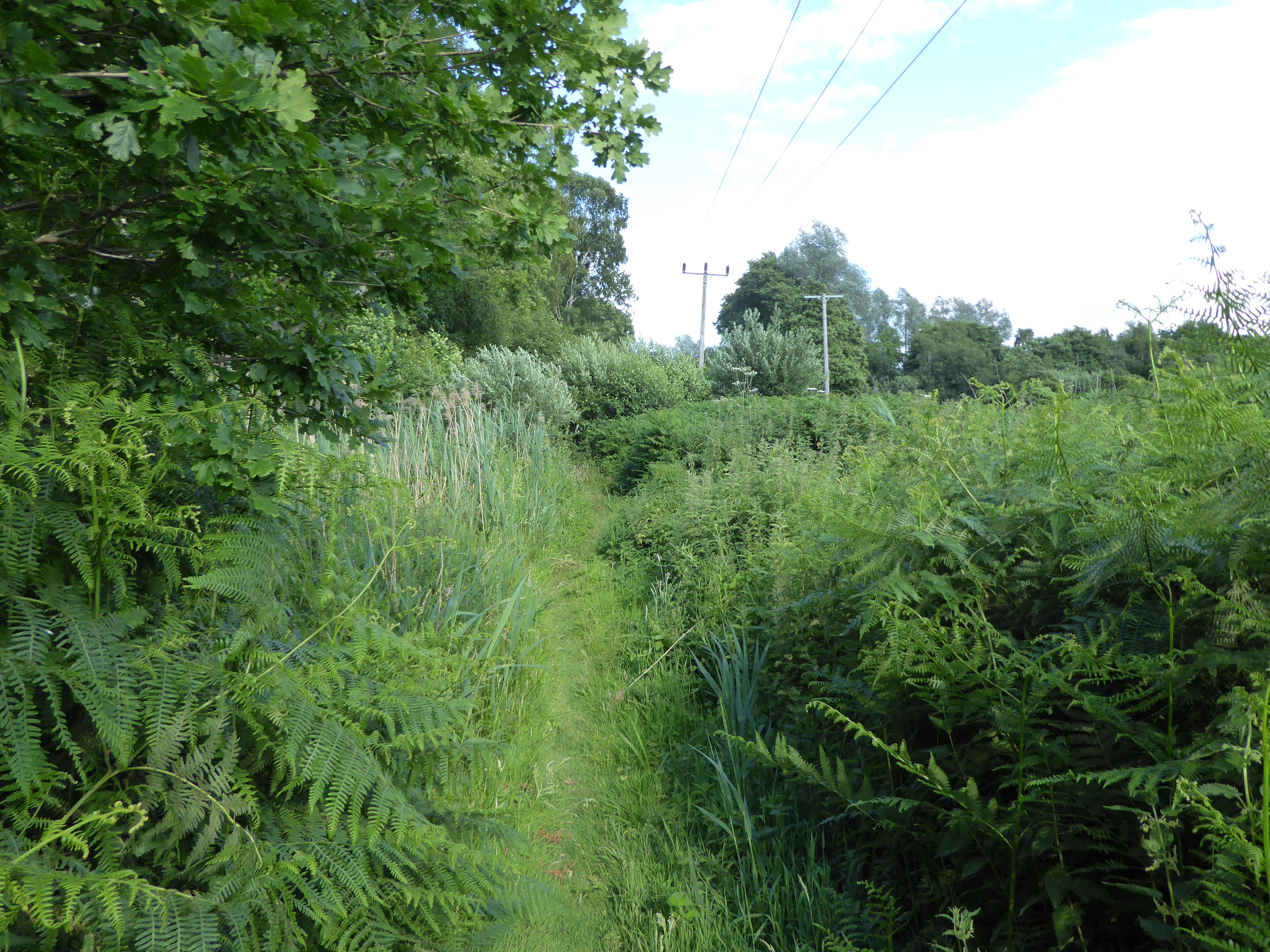
- Interactive map of Bromeswell Green
- Type: Nature reserve
- Location: Woodbridge, Suffolk
- Area: 7.2 hectares (18 acres)
- Manager: Suffolk Wildlife Trust

Bromeswell Green is a 7.2-hectare (18-acre) nature reserve in Bromeswell, east of Woodbridge in Suffolk. It is managed by the Suffolk Wildlife Trust.

This site has woodland, saltmarsh and wet meadows. Wetland plants include lesser spearwort, fen bedstraw and southern marsh orchid, the woodland has birds such as nightingales and whitethroats, and rides have many species of butterfly.

There is access from Common Lane, which passes through the reserve.
