= Weston Fen, Suffolk =

Protected area in Suffolk, England

Coordinates: 52.37°N 0.91°E

Weston Fen
- Site of Special Scientific Interest
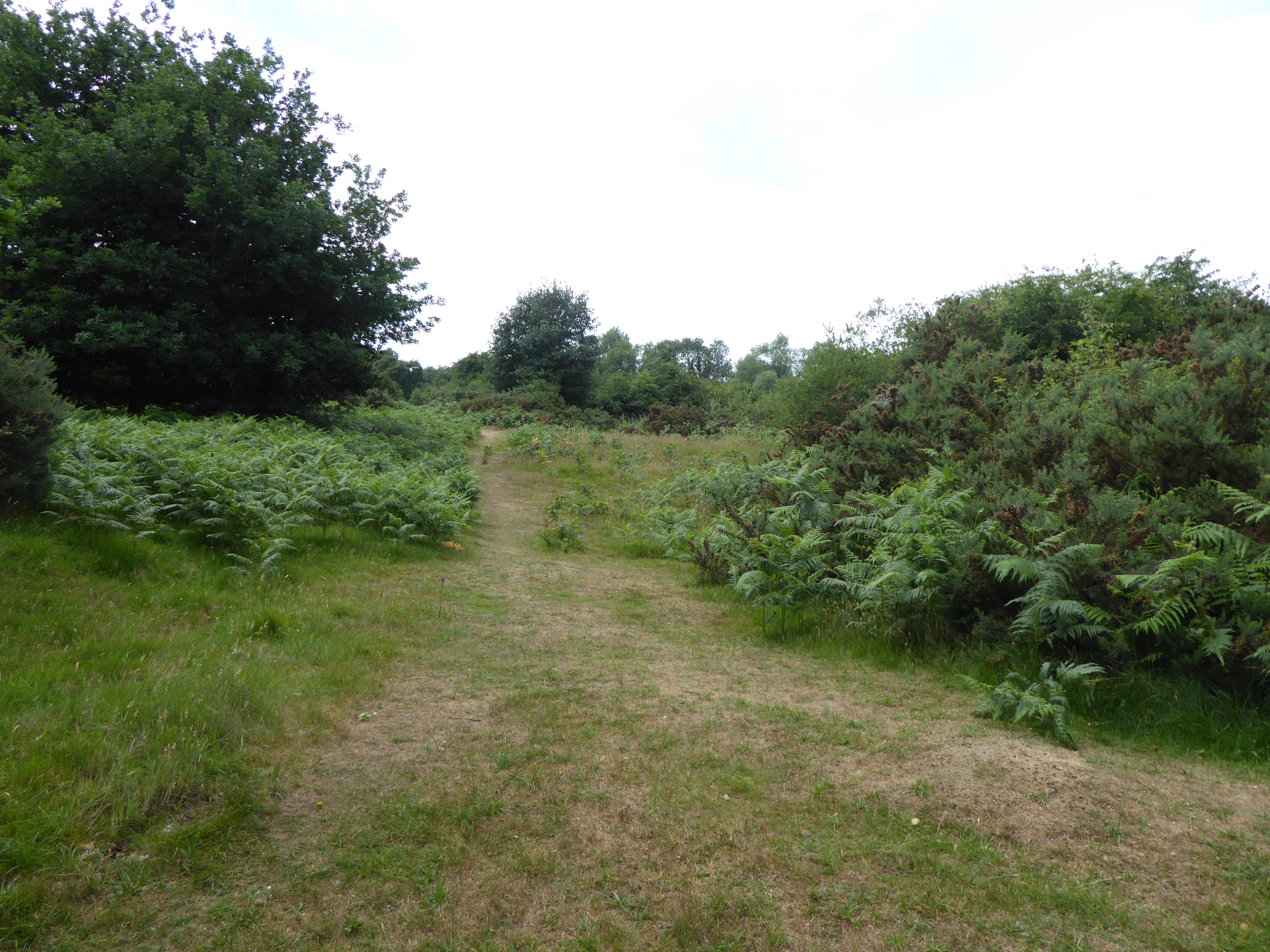
- Location of Weston Fen.
- Area of search: Suffolk
- Grid reference: TL 980 786
- Interest: Biological
- Area: 49.7 hectares
- Notification date: 1986
- Location map: Magic Map

Weston Fen is a 49.7-hectare (123-acre) biological Site of Special Scientific Interest in Hopton in Suffolk. It is part of the Waveney and Little Ouse Valley Fens Special Areas of Conservation, and an area of 37 hectares is managed as a nature reserve called Market Weston Fen by the Suffolk Wildlife Trust.

This spring-fed valley fen has a high and stable water table, and as a result it has a rich and varied flora. The dominant plants in the central fen area are saw sedge, the reed Phragmites australis and blunt-flowered rush. Other habitats include tall fen grassland, heath and a stream. There are many dragonflies and damselflies.

There is access from Fen Street. Parking for 3-4 cars on verge immediately after the signposted public footpath and entrance to fen.
