= Metfield Meadow =

Nature reserve in Suffolk, England

Coordinates: 52.368°N 1.381°E

- Site of Special Scientific Interest
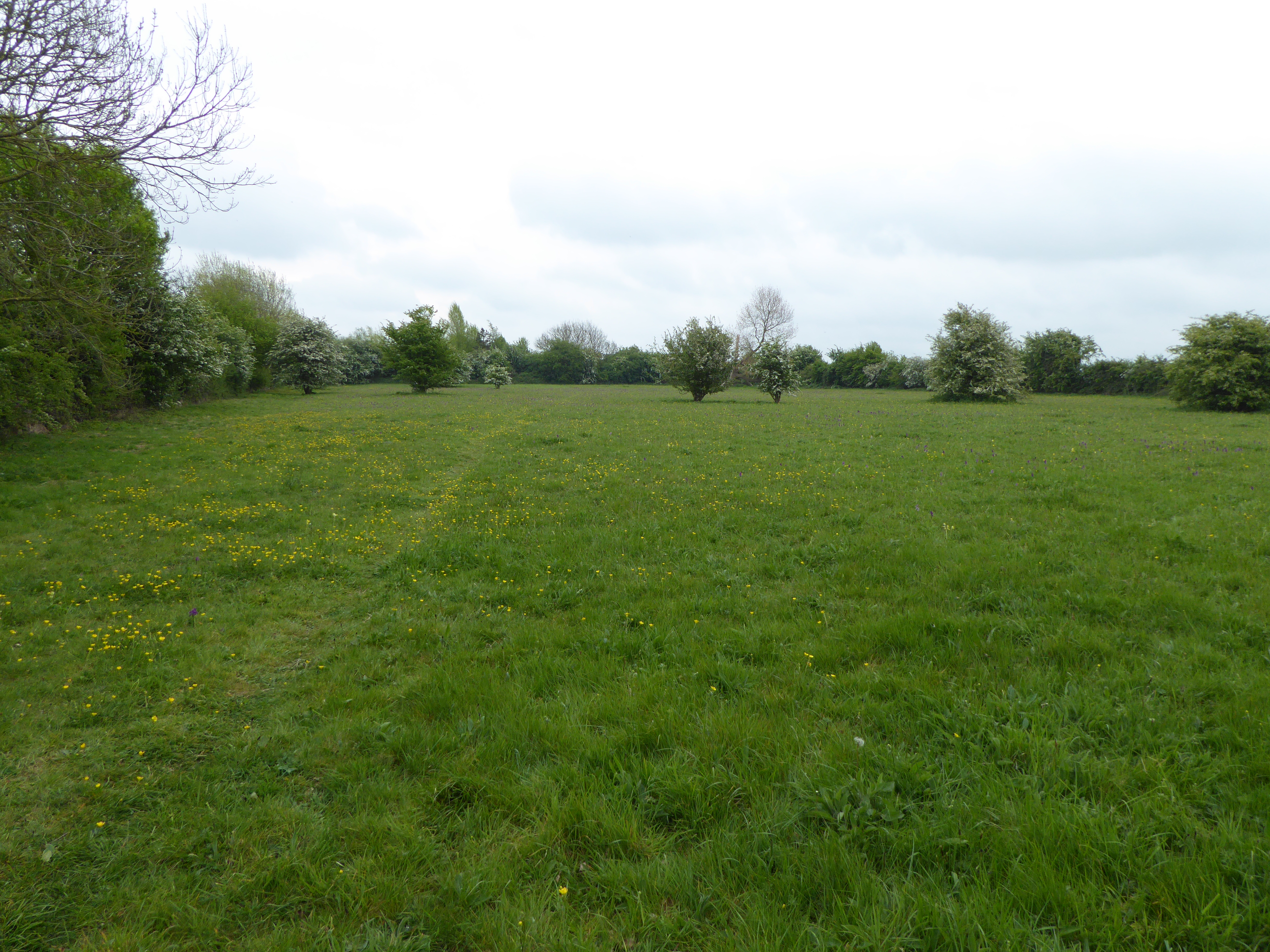
- Location of Metfield Meadow.
- Area of search: Suffolk
- Grid reference: TM 303 798
- Interest: Biological
- Area: 1.3 hectares
- Notification date: 1987
- Location map: Magic Map

Metfield Meadow is a 1.3-hectare (3.2-acre) biological Site of Special Scientific Interest west of Halesworth in Suffolk. It is owned and managed by Suffolk Wildlife Trust under the name Winks Meadow.

This meadow on a disused airfield is unimproved grassland, with a rich variety of flora on chalky boulder clay. There are many green-winged orchids, cowslips and pepper saxifrages. The meadow is grazed by cattle or cut for hay to maintain the diversity of the wild flowers.

There is access to the site from Nunn's Lane.
