= Mickle Mere =

Nature reserve in Suffolk, England

Coordinates: 52.29°N 0.839°E

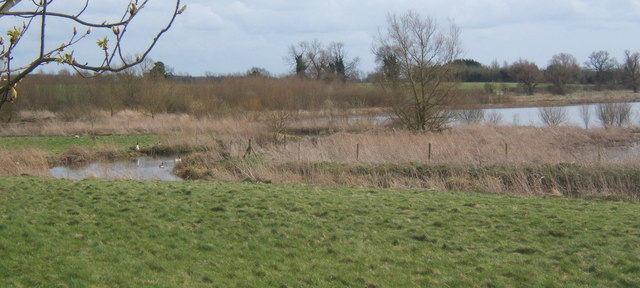
- Interactive map of Mickle Mere
- Type: Nature reserve
- Location: Ixworth, Suffolk
- OS grid: TL937696
- Area: 17 hectares (42 acres)
- Manager: Suffolk Wildlife Trust

Mickle Mere is a 17-hectare (42-acre) nature reserve south of Ixworth in Suffolk. It is managed by the Suffolk Wildlife Trust.

This area of open water and wet meadows has diverse bird life such as lapwings, kestrels, little egrets and reed buntings, as well as mammals like water voles and otters.

There is access from Mill Road.
