= Suffolk Wildlife Trust =

British charitable organization

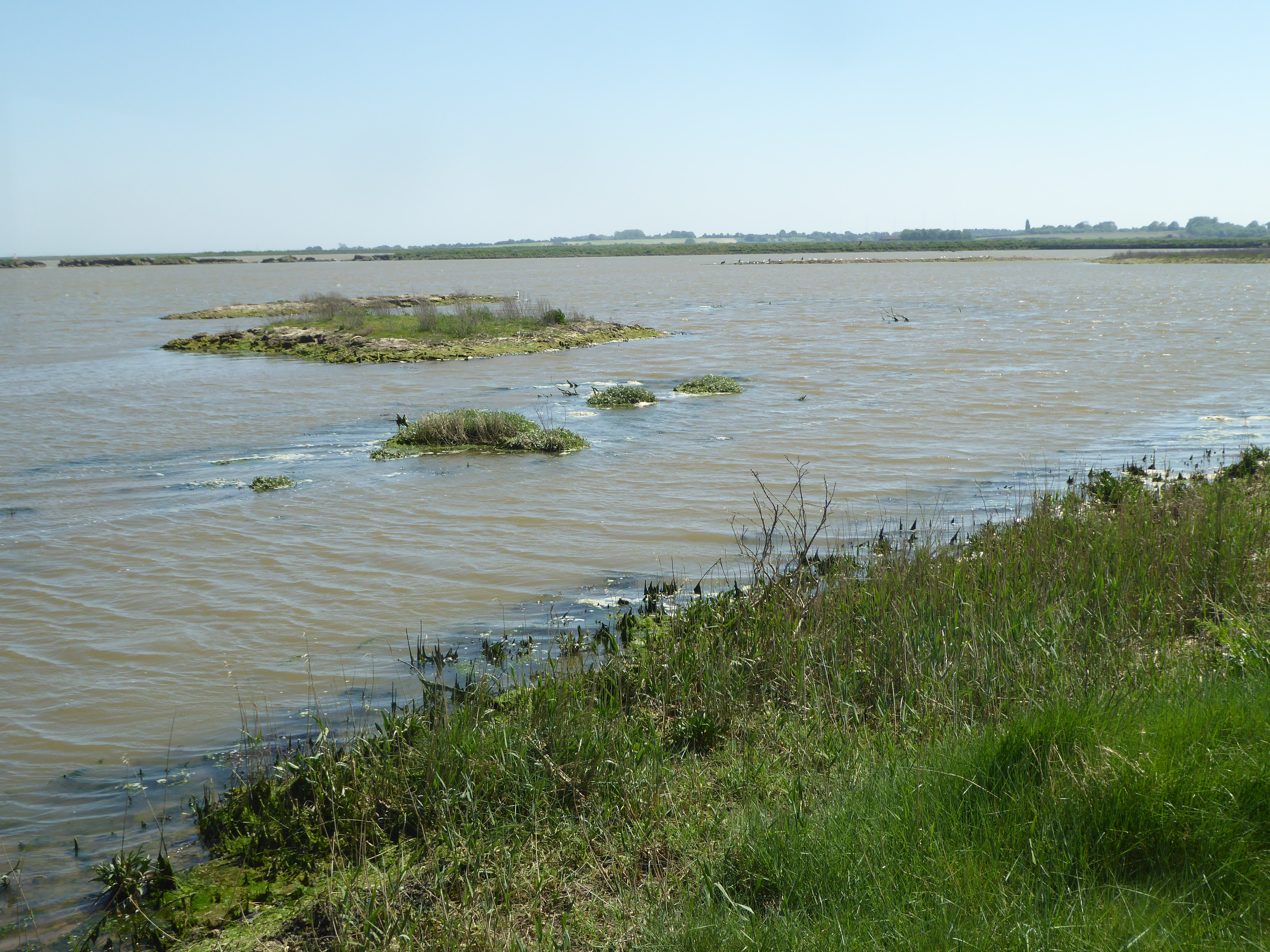
Hazlewood Marshes was a freshwater lagoon until a tidal surge broke through the sea wall and flooded the site with seawater.

Suffolk Wildlife Trust (SWT) describes itself as the county's "nature charity – the only organisation dedicated wholly to safeguarding Suffolk's wildlife and countryside." It is a registered charity, and its headquarters is at Brooke House in Ashbocking, near Ipswich. It was founded in 1961, and is one of 46 wildlife trusts covering Great Britain and Northern Ireland. As of March 2025, it has 110 employees, 929 volunteers, 28,000 members, and it manages approx. 7,700 acres of land across 50 nature reserves, all of which are open to the public. (Note: Some sites which are not open to the public are not listed on the SWT's website, and this article lists the 53 nature reserves which are listed by SWT.) It had an income of £7.71 million in the year to 31 March 2025.

Suffolk is a county in East Anglia. It is bounded by Norfolk to the north, Cambridgeshire to the west, Essex to the south and the North Sea to the east. With an area of 1,466 square miles (3,800 km^{2}), it is the eighth largest county in England, and in mid-2016 the population was 745,000. The top level of local government is Suffolk County Council, and below it are five borough and district councils: Babergh, Ipswich, Mid Suffolk, East Suffolk, West Suffolk. Much of the coast consists of the estuaries of the Orwell, Stour, Alde, Deben and Blyth rivers, with large areas of wetlands and marshes. Agriculture and shipping play a major role in the county's economy.

The whole or part of nine SWT reserves are Ramsar internationally important wetland sites, thirty-one are Sites of Special Scientific Interest, four are national nature reserves, ten are Special Protection Areas, ten are Special Areas of Conservation, seven are Nature Conservation Review sites, one contains a scheduled monument and three are local nature reserves. One SWT reserve is in Dedham Vale, which is an Area of Outstanding Natural Beauty (AONB), and seven are in another AONB, Suffolk Coast and Heaths.

== Key ==
=== Public access ===
- No = no public access to site
- FP = public access to footpaths through the site
- PL = public access at limited times
- PP = public access to part of site
- Yes = public access to the whole or most of the site

=== Other classifications ===
- DVAONB = Dedham Vale Area of Outstanding Natural Beauty
- GCR = Geological Conservation Review
- LNR = Local nature reserve
- NCR = Nature Conservation Review
- NNR = National nature reserve
- NT = National Trust
- Ramsar = Ramsar site, an internationally important wetland site
- SAC = Special Area of Conservation
- SCHAONB = Suffolk Coast and Heaths Area of Outstanding Natural Beauty
- SM = Scheduled monument
- SPA = Special Protection Area under the European Union Directive on the Conservation of Wild Birds
- SSSI = Site of Special Scientific Interest

== Sites ==
Site	Photograph	Area (Note: Unless otherwise stated, the area and location are taken from the Wildlife Trust page for each site.)	Location	Public access	Designations	Description
Alde Mudflats	Alde Mudflats	22 hectares (54 acres)	Aldeburgh; 52.152°N 1.505°E; TM399562	NO	NCR, Ramsar, SAC, SCHAONB, SPA, SSSI	This 3-mile (4.8-kilometre) stretch of inter-tidal mud and saltmarsh supports internationally important numbers of avocets, and other birds include black-tailed godwits, oystercatchers, marsh harriers, pintails, wigeons and grey plovers.
Arger Fen and Spouse's Vale	Arger Fen and Spouse's Vale	110 hectares (270 acres)	Sudbury; 51.99°N 0.81°E; TL932357	YES	DVAONB, LNR, SSSI	This site has ancient and young woodland, and areas of fen meadow. There is a large population of badgers, and uncommon fauna include hazel dormice and barbastelle bats. There are butterflies such as speckled woods, meadow browns and holly blues.
Black Bourn Valley	Black Bourn Valley	88 hectares (220 acres)	Bury St Edmunds; 52.25°N 0.84°E; TL943650	YES		The River Black Bourn runs through this large nature reserve, which has many bird species, such as barn owls, yellowhammers, linnets, reed buntings and skylarks. Plants in wet meadows include marsh orchids and marsh marigolds.
Blaxhall Common	Blaxhall Common	44 hectares (110 acres)	Woodbridge; 52.156°N 1.481°E; TM382566	YES	SCHAONB, SM, SPA, SSSI	This dry lowland heath has large areas of heather which supports diverse lichens and mosses, and other areas of grassland which are grazed by rabbits. Heathland birds include nightjars and tree pipits.
Bonny Wood	Bonny Wood	20 hectares (49 acres)	Ipswich; 52.131°N 1.032°E; TM076524	YES	SSSI	Orchids in this coppiced wood include early-purples, lesser twayblades, common spotteds and greater butterflies. There are many birds, badgers and deer.
Bradfield Woods	Bradfield Woods	63 hectares (160 acres)	Bury St Edmunds; 52.19°N 0.83°E; TL937580	YES	NNR, SSSI	These woods have a history of coppicing dating to before 1252, producing a very high diversity of flora, with over 370 plant species recorded. Uncommon woodland flowers include oxlip, herb paris and ramson. There is also a rich variety of fungi, with two species not recorded elsewhere in Britain.
Bromeswell Green	Bromeswell Green	7.2 hectares (18 acres)	Woodbridge; 52.105°N 1.351°E; TM296505	YES		This site has woodland, saltmarsh and wet meadows. Wetland plants include lesser spearwort, fen bedstraw and southern marsh orchid, the woodland has birds such as nightingales and whitethroats, and rides have many species of butterfly.
Brooke House	Brooke House	Not available	Ipswich; 52.143°N 1.189°E; TM182541	YES		Brooke House is the headquarters of the Suffolk Wildlife Trust. It was left to the trust by Mary Brooke. It has gardens with fruit trees and a pond, where water voles have been observed.
Bull's Wood	Bull's Wood	12 hectares (30 acres)	Bury St Edmunds; 52.159°N 0.803°E; TL918549	YES	SSSI	Flora in this wood include early-purple orchids, herb-paris and the uncommon oxlips. There are roe deer, marsh tits, and butterflies such as gatekeepers, speckled woods and orange tips.
Captain's Wood	Captain's Wood	62 hectares (150 acres)	Sudbourne; 52.12°N 1.54°E; TM421531	YES		This site has woodland, rough grassland and scrub. A herd of fallow deer helps to keep the land open, and there are also barn owls, buzzards, mature oak trees and many bluebells.
Carlton and Oulton Marshes	Carlton and Oulton Marshes	151 hectares (370 acres)	Lowestoft; 52.47°N 1.69°E; TM509919	PP	Ramsar, SAC, SPA, SSSI	Semi-aquatic fen raft spiders were released on the site in 2012 to boost the low British population, and underwater insectiverous bladderworts trap water fleas. Birds of prey include marsh harriers, barn owls and hobbies, and there are many wintering wildfowl and breeding waders.
Castle Marshes	Castle Marshes	71 hectares (180 acres)	Beccles; 52.46°N 1.63°E; TM470911	NO	Ramsar, SAC, SPA, SSSI	The site has fen, freshwater dykes and grazing marshes. Resident wildfowl include wigeons, gadwalls, teals and shovelers are joined in winter by migrants when the marshes are flooded. Scarce chaser and the nationally rare Norfolk hawker dragonflies breed on the site, and there are blue-tailed damselflies.
Church Farm Marshes	[Church Farm Marshes	56 hectares (140 acres)	Halesworth; 52.31°N 1.55°E; TM420742	YES		This site has areas of marshland, wet and dry woodland, and grassland. The flower-rich marshes have southern marsh orchid, marsh marigold and ragged robin. Grazing maintains diversity of flora in the meadows and marshes, ensuring a good population of insects, which provide food for birds.
Combs Wood	Combs Wood	17 hectares (42 acres)	Stowmarket; 52.171°N 0.999°E; TM052568	YES	SSSI	This is ancient coppice woodland on boulder clay, with variable quantities of sand and loess resulting in different soil types. In areas of pedunculate oak and hornbeam the ground flora is sparse, but it is rich and diverse in ash and maple woodland. Grassy rides and a pond provide additional habitats for invertebrates.
Cornard Mere	Cornard Mere	6 hectares (15 acres)	Sudbury; 52.014°N 0.747°E; TL886386	YES	SSSI	This site has diverse habitats, with fen which is seasonally flooded, ruderal herb vegetation, woodland, grassland and scrub. Flora include water mint, gypsywort, skullcap, ragged robin and southern marsh orchid.
Darsham Marshes	Darsham Marshes	20 hectares (49 acres)	Halesworth; 52.268°N 1.545°E; TM420692	YES		This marsh and fen site has two ponds and a network of dykes. The wildlife is diverse and flowering plants include ragged-robin, yellow flag, marsh marigold and southern marsh orchid. There are birds such as marsh harriers and hen harriers, and mammals include otters and water voles.
Dingle Marshes	Dingle Marshes	93 hectares (230 acres)	Dunwich; 52.28°N 1.63°E; TM479708	YES	NCR, NNR Ramsar, SAC, SCHAONB, SPA, SSSI	This site has the largest freshwater reedbeds in Britain. Other habitats are brackish pools, shingle, heath and woodland. There are otters and Exmoor ponies, and birds include bearded tits, bitterns, marsh harriers and grey plovers.
Dunwich Forest	Dunwich Forest	270 hectares (670 acres)	Dunwich; 52.28°N 1.62°E; TM467710	YES		The Trust is transforming this former conifer plantation into a mosaic of broad leaved woodland, lowland heath, acid grassland and wet woodland. Fauna include siskins, adders, noctule bats, red deer and white admiral butterflies.
Fox Fritillary Meadow	Fox Fritillary Meadow	2.4 hectares (5.9 acres)	Stowmarket; 52.202°N 1.201°E; TM188607	NO	SSSI	This unimproved meadow is located on heavy alluvial soils at the bottom of a valley. It has a rich variety of flora, including the herbs cowslip, cuckooflower and ragged robin, together with the largest population in East Anglia of the rare snake's head fritillary.
Foxburrow Farm	Foxburrow Farm	67 hectares (170 acres)	Woodbridge; 52.12°N 1.32°E; TM274517	YES		Part of this site is a working farm which is managed by a tenant farmer, and it also has wildlife habitats and an education centre. Birds include little owls, spotted flycatchers and pied wagtails, and there are ponds with great crested newts.
Groton Wood	Groton Wood	20 hectares (49 acres)	Hadleigh; 52.048°N 0.88°E; TL976428	YES	SSSI	Fifteen species of butterfly have been recorded in this wood, including brimstones, speckled woods and purple hairstreaks. There are many wild cherry trees, and twenty-two seasonal ponds, which have scarce and protected great crested newts.
Gunton Meadow	Gunton Meadow	2 hectares (4.9 acres)	Lowestoft; 52.503°N 1.738°E; TM538960	YES		Gunton Meadow was saved from development as a planning condition for the expansion of a local supermarket. It has scrub, a pond and grassland. There are five species of orchid including the common spotted and green-winged, and great crested newts in the pond.
Gunton Warren	Gunton Warren	25 hectares (62 acres)	Lowestoft; 52.5°N 1.754°E; TM549958	YES	LNR	Gunton Warren is a coastal site which has sand dunes, shingle, lowland heath and cliff slopes. Birds include rare migrants such as icterines and yellow-browed warblers.
Hazlewood Marshes	Hazlewood Marshes	64 hectares (160 acres)	Aldeburgh; 52.17°N 1.57°E; TM442582	YES	SSSI	This was formerly a fresh water lagoon and marshes, but on 5 December 2013 a tidal surge broke through the sea wall and flooded the site with sea water. Whole communities of plants and invertebrates disappeared, and the site is converting to salt marsh, with birds including black-tailed godwits, dunlins, redshanks, lapwings and avocets.
Hen Reedbeds	Hen Reedbeds	55 hectares (140 acres)	Southwold; 52.34°N 1.63°E; TM471771	YES	NNR, Ramsar, SCHAONB, SSSI	The reserve is a mix of wetland habitats, including reedbeds, fens, dykes and pools. It was designed to provide a breeding site for bitterns. Other fauna include marsh harriers, herons, bearded tits, four-spotted chaser dragonflies, hairy dragonflies, otters and water voles.
Hopton Fen	Hopton Fen	15 hectares (37 acres)	Diss; 52.378°N 0.922°E; TL990796	YES	SSSI	This reed-dominated fen has diverse flora, including devil's bit scabious, black bog-rush, bogbean and early marsh orchid. The Trust is improving the site by excavating new pools, and introducing grazing to restore the open landscape.
Hutchison's Meadow	Hutchison's Meadow	1 hectare (2.5 acres)	Woodbridge; 52.103°N 1.328°E; TM280502	NO		This is mixture of wet and dry grassland. It has diverse flowering plants such as southern marsh orchid, common fleabane and ragged robin in wet areas, and yellow rattle and bulbous buttercup in drier ones.
Knettishall Heath	Knettishall Heath	176 hectares (430 acres)	Diss; 52.39°N 0.89°E; TL966806	YES	SSSI	The site is heath and grassland, mainly on acidic soils, with areas of secondary woodland and wet hollows. There are heathland plants such as sheep's sorrel, tormentil, harebell and heath bedstraw, while wet areas have fen vegetation including water mint and yellow iris.
Lackford Lakes	Lackford Lakes	131 hectares (320 acres)	Bury St Edmunds; 52.3°N 0.64°E; TL800706	YES	SSSI	The lakes are disused sand and gravel pits in the valley of the River Lark. There are diverse dragonfly species, and many breeding and overwintering birds, including nationally important numbers of gadwalls and shovellers. Skylarks breed on dry grassland, and lapwings in marshy meadows.
Levington Lagoon	Levington Lagoon	5 hectares (12 acres)	Ipswich; 52.003°N 1.259°E; TM238389	NO		This area of open water and saltmarsh on the bank of the River Orwell was formed when the sea wall was breached during the North Sea flood of 1953. The birds are diverse, including greenshanks, dunlins, spotted redshanks, pipits and dunlins. There are plants such as sea lavender.
Lound Lakes	Lound Lakes	113 hectares (280 acres)	Great Yarmouth; 52.55°N 1.7°E; TG511007	YES		Habitats in this site include open water, woodland, grassland, rush pasture and fen meadow. More than 140 bird species have been recorded there, including hobbies, geese, ducks, reed warblers, gadwalls and oystercatchers. Brown long-eared and noctule bats are also present.
Market Weston Fen	Market Weston Fen	37 hectares (91 acres)	Diss; 52.372°N 0.912°E; TL983789	YES	SAC, SSSI	This spring-fed valley fen has a high and stable water table, and as a result it has a rich and varied flora. The dominant plants in the central fen area are saw sedge, the reed Phragmites australis and blunt-flowered rush. Other habitats include tall fen grassland, heath and a stream. There are many dragonflies and damselflies.
Martins' Meadows	Martins' Meadows	4 hectares (9.9 acres)	Woodbridge; 52.168°N 1.254°E; TM226572	YES	NCR, SSSI	This site has rich flora, and it is described by Natural England as probably the best example in the county of unimproved calcareous clay and neutral grassland. The herb species are especially diverse, including meadow saffron and green-winged orchid, and there are ancient fruit trees.
Martlesham Wilds		117 hectares (290 acres)	Martlesham; 52°4′27″N 1°17′47″E; TM 260 469	YES	Ramsar, SSSI	A rewilding site on the banks of the River Deben.
Mellis Common	Mellis Common	59 hectares (150 acres)	Eye; 52.33°N 1.08°E; TM100746	YES		The common has changed little over hundreds of years, and is still managed by traditional methods of grazing and hay cutting. Flora include green-winged orchid, sulphur clover and adder's tongue fern, and owls hunt small mammals.
Mickfield Meadow	Mickfield Meadow	1.7 hectares (4.2 acres)	Stowmarket; 52.226°N 1.136°E; TM143633	YES	SSSI	Fertilisers and herbicides have never been used on this meadow, and as a result it has a rich variety of flora, including fritillary. The dominant grasses are meadow foxtail, cocksfoot, false oat-grass, timothy and Yorkshire fog.
Mickle Mere	Mickle Mere	17 hectares (42 acres)	Bury St Edmunds; 52.29°N 0.839°E; TL937696	YES		This area of open water and wet meadows has diverse bird life such as lapwings, kestrels, little egrets and reed buntings, and mammals include water voles and otters.
Newbourne Springs	Newbourne Springs	19 hectares (47 acres)	Woodbridge; 52.041°N 1.314°E; TM274433	YES	SSSI	Most of this site is a narrow valley with a fast-flowing stream with alder carr and fen. Drier and more acidic soils have grassland, woodland, scrub and bracken heath. The site is actively managed, producing diverse flora and many breeding and migratory birds such as treecreepers, nuthatches and sedge warblers.
Norah Hanbury-Kelk Meadows	Norah Hanbury-Kelk Meadows	8 hectares (20 acres)	Bury St Edmunds; 52.337°N 0.513°E; TL713740	YES		These wet meadows and dykes have diverse flora, such as southern marsh orchids, lady's smock, early marsh orchid and greater bird's foot trefoil. Birds include snipe and ducks.
North Cove	North Cove	15.5 hectares (38 acres)	Beccles; 52.457°N 1.636°E; TM471905	YES	Ramsar, SAC, SPA, SSSI	Since 2020 managed by the owner and Beccles Bird Society, the site has wet woodland, grazing marsh, ponds and dykes. There are birds such as sparrowhawks, woodcocks, redpolls, siskins and the three species of woodpecker. Flora include opposite-leaved golden-saxifrage, bog pimpernel and the nationally scarce marsh fern.
Old Broom	Old Broom	6.5 hectares (16 acres)	Bury St Edmunds; 52.275°N 0.64°E; TL802674	NO		This is a remnant of an ancient wood-pasture landscape with oak pollards between 250 and 500 years old. The dead wood and hollow centres of these trees provide a habitat for fungi and invertebrates, while the bark hosts mosses and lichens.
Redgrave and Lopham Fens	Redgrave and South Lopham Fen	163 hectares (400 acres)	Diss; 52.38°N 1.01°E; TM049796	YES	NCR, NNR, Ramsar, SAC SSSI	This spring-fed valley at the head of the River Waveney has several different types of fen vegetation. There are aquatic plants such as bladderwort, fen pondweed and Charophytes, all of which are indicators of low levels of pollution. The site has the only British population of fen raft spiders.
Reydon Wood	Reydon Wood	16 hectares (40 acres)	Southwold; 52.351°N 1.64°E; TM480788	YES		This conifer wood has many old ash and hornbeam stools. There are many wildflowers and birds, and butterflies such as ringlet, gatekeeper and orange tip.
Roydon Fen	Roydon Fen	17.2 hectares (43 acres)	Diss; 52.375°N 1.085°E; TM101797	YES	LNR	This site was taken over by wet woodland in the twentieth century, but the SWT has restored the eastern end to fen by mowing, and it has many typical fen plants such as marsh helleborine, marsh fragrant orchid and sawsedge.
Simpson's Saltings	Simpson's Saltings	25 hectares (62 acres)	Woodbridge; 52.055°N 1.474°E; TM383453	NO	NCR, Ramsar, SAC, SCHAONB, SPA, SSSI	The Saltings are described by the Trust as "one of the county's most important coastal sites for its wealth of uncommon coastal and saltmarsh plants." There are also rare lichens. Habitats include intertidal mud, estuary creeks, saltmarsh, compacted sand and shingle.
Sizewell Belts	Sizewell Belts	144 hectares (360 acres)	Leiston; 52.22°N 1.59°E; TM453639	YES	SCHAONB, SSSI	These unimproved wet meadows are described by Natural England as important for their outstanding assemblages of invertebrates, with many nationally rare and scarce species, and of national significance for its assemblage of breeding birds typical of wet grassland. The aquatic fauna is diverse, including the nationally scarce soft hornwort and fen pondweed.
Snape Marshes	Snape Marshes	19.8 hectares (49 acres)	Saxmundham; 52.165°N 1.501°E; TM395576	FP		The diverse habitats in this reserve include reed-filled marshes, dry heath and mature oak woodland. It has all four reptiles found in the county, adders, common lizards, grass snakes and slowworms. Birds include barn owls, hobbies and marsh harriers, and freshwater dykes provide a habitat for otters.
Sutton and Hollesley Commons	Sutton and Hollesley Commons	400 hectares (990 acres)	Woodbridge; 52.07°N 1.41°E; TM335471	YES	SCHAONB, SPA, SSSI	These remnants of the Sandlings Heaths (Note: Sandlings Heaths are coastal heaths in Suffolk.) consist of dry grass and heather heathland, together with areas of bracken, scrub and pine and birch woodland. Breeding birds include long-eared owls, and hen harriers roost there in the winter.
Thelnetham Fen	Thelnetham Fen	8.8 hectares (22 acres)	Diss; 52.368°N 0.961°E; TM017786	YES	NCR, SAC SSSI	This wet fen site has many wild flowers, including saw sedge, black bog rush and the rare grass-of-parnassus. Other habitats include wet woodland and reed beds along the bank of the River Little Ouse. The reed beds provide nesting sites for migrant birds such as sedge, grasshopper and reed warblers.
Trimley Marshes	Trimley Marshes	77 hectares (190 acres)	Felixstowe; 51.97°N 1.29°E; TM 262 355	YES	Ramsar, SCHAONB, SPA, SSSI	This site has a reservoir, islands, reedbeds and marshes. It has a rich variety and number of birds, such as redshankss, avocets, oystercatchers, little grebes and gadwalls.
Wangford Warren	Wangford Warren	15 hectares (37 acres)	Brandon; 52.426°N 0.586°E; TL759840	PL	NCR, SAC, SPA, SSSI	This dry site has sand dunes and mounds which are stabilised by sand sedge and grasses. It is one of only two inland sites in Britain which has grey hair-grass, and other rare plants include shepherd's cress, bearded fescue and reindeer moss. Uncommon solitary bees and wasps burrow into sand.
Winks Meadow	Winks Meadow	1.4 hectares (3.5 acres)	Stowmarket; 52.369°N 1.382°E; TM303799	YES	SSSI	This meadow on a disused airfield is unimproved grassland, with a rich variety of flora on chalky boulder clay. There are many green-winged orchids, cowslips and pepper saxifrages. The meadow is grazed by cattle or cut for hay to maintain the diversity of the wild flowers.

== See also ==
- List of Sites of Special Scientific Interest in Suffolk
- National Nature Reserves in Suffolk
- List of Local Nature Reserves in Suffolk

== Sources ==
- Ratcliffe, Derek, ed. (1977). A Nature Conservation Review. Vol. 2. Cambridge, UK: Cambridge University Press. ISBN 978-0-521-21403-2.
