= Old Broom =

Nature reserve in Suffolk, England

Coordinates: 52.275°N 0.64°E

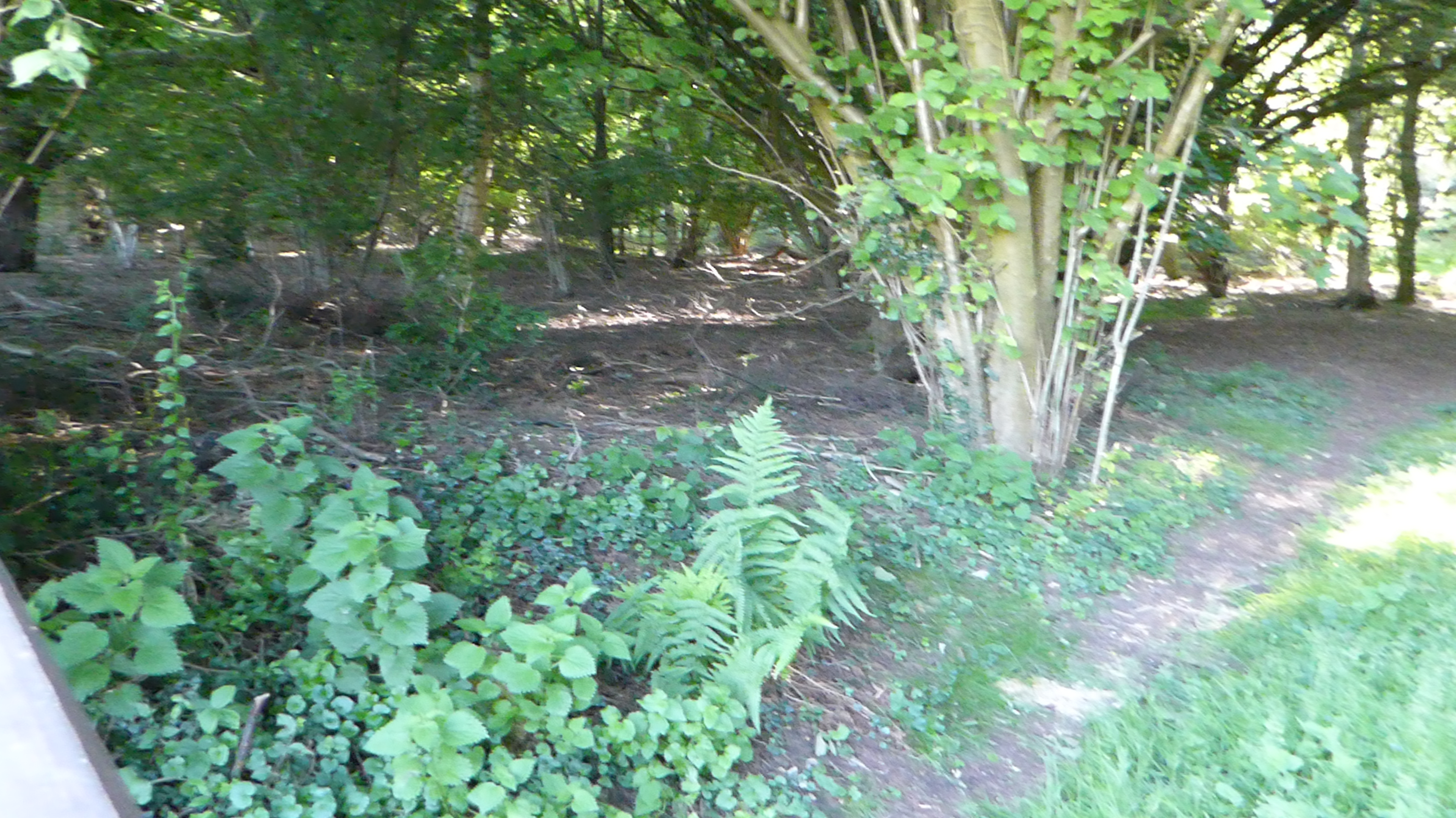
- Interactive map of Old Broom
- Type: Nature reserve
- Location: Risby, Suffolk
- OS grid: TL 802 674
- Area: 6.5 hectares (16 acres)
- Manager: Suffolk Wildlife Trust

Old Broom is a 6.5-hectare (16-acre) nature reserve north of Risby in Suffolk. It is managed by the Suffolk Wildlife Trust.

This is a remnant of an ancient wood-pasture landscape with oak pollards between 250 and 500 years old. The dead wood and hollow centres of these trees provide a habitat for fungi and invertebrates, while the bark hosts mosses and lichens.

There is no public access to this site.
