= Mellis Common =

Nature reserve in Suffolk, England

Coordinates: 52.33°N 1.08°E

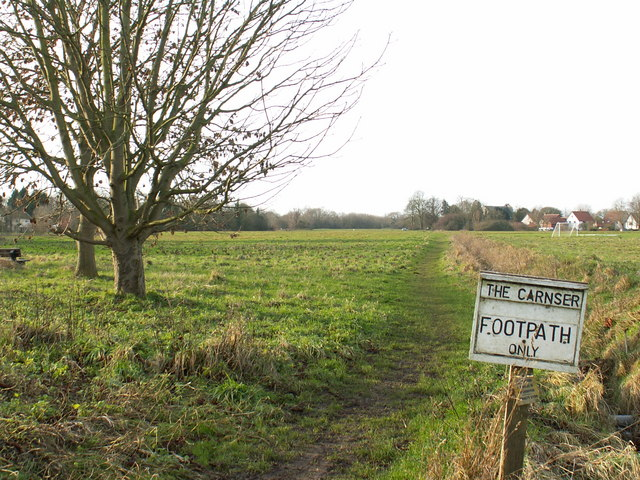
- Interactive map of Mellis Common
- Type: Nature reserve
- Location: Mellis, Suffolk
- OS grid: TM100746
- Area: 59 hectares (150 acres)
- Manager: Suffolk Wildlife Trust

Mellis Common is a 59 hectare nature reserve in Mellis in Suffolk. It is managed by the Suffolk Wildlife Trust.

The common has changed little over hundreds of years, and is still managed by traditional methods of grazing and hay cutting. Flora include green-winged orchid, sulphur clover and adder’s tongue fern, and owls hunt small mammals.

There is access from Mellis Road.
