= Sutton and Hollesley Heaths =

Nature reserve in Suffolk, England

Coordinates: 52.07°N 1.4°E

- Site of Special Scientific Interest
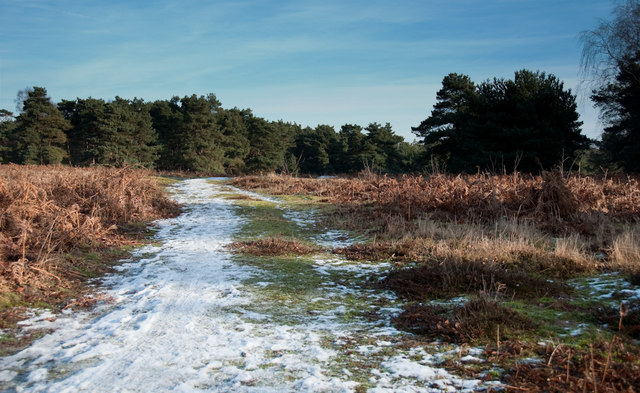
- Sutton Common in winter
- Location of Sutton and Hollesley Heaths.
- Area of search: Suffolk
- Grid reference: TM 332 469
- Interest: Biological
- Area: 483.3 hectares
- Notification date: 1987
- Location map: Magic Map

Sutton and Hollesley Heaths is a 483.3-hectare (1,194-acre) biological Site of Special Scientific Interest south-east of Woodbridge in Suffolk. Most of the site is managed by the Suffolk Wildlife Trust as Sutton and Hollesley Commons. It is part of the Sandlings Special Protection Area under the European Union Directive on the Conservation of Wild Birds, and the Suffolk Coast and Heaths Area of Outstanding Natural Beauty.

These remnants of the formerly extensive sandy heaths of the Suffolk coast consist of dry grass and heather heathland, together with areas of bracken, scrub and pine and birch woodland. Breeding birds include long-eared owls, and hen harriers roost there in the winter.

There is access to the site from Heath Road.
