= Roydon Fen =

Nature reserve with fen and wet woodland

Coordinates: 52.375°N 1.085°E

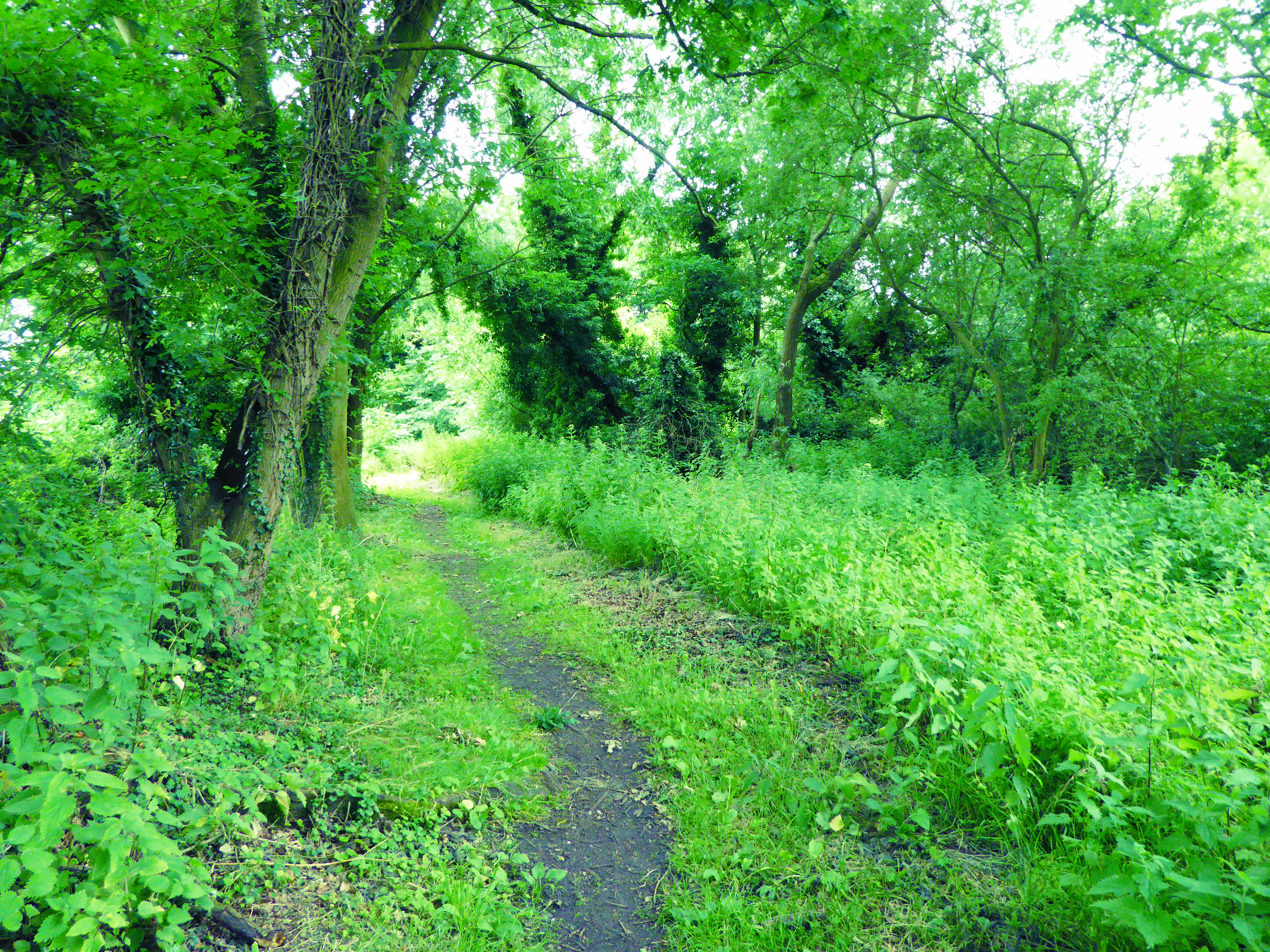
- Interactive map of Roydon Fen
- Type: Local Nature Reserve
- Location: Roydon, Norfolk
- OS grid: TM 101 797
- Area: 17.2 hectares (43 acres)
- Manager: Suffolk Wildlife Trust

Roydon Fen is a 17.2 hectare Local Nature Reserve south of Roydon, on the western outskirts of Diss in Norfolk. It is owned by South Norfolk District Council and managed by the Suffolk Wildlife Trust.

This site was taken over by wet woodland in the twentieth century, but the Trust has restored the eastern end to fen by mowing, and it has many typical fen plants such as marsh helleborine, marsh fragrant orchid and sawsedge.

There is access from the Angles Way footpath, which runs along the northern boundary of the site.
