= Foxburrow Farm =

Nature reserve in Suffolk, England

Coordinates: 52.12°N 1.32°E

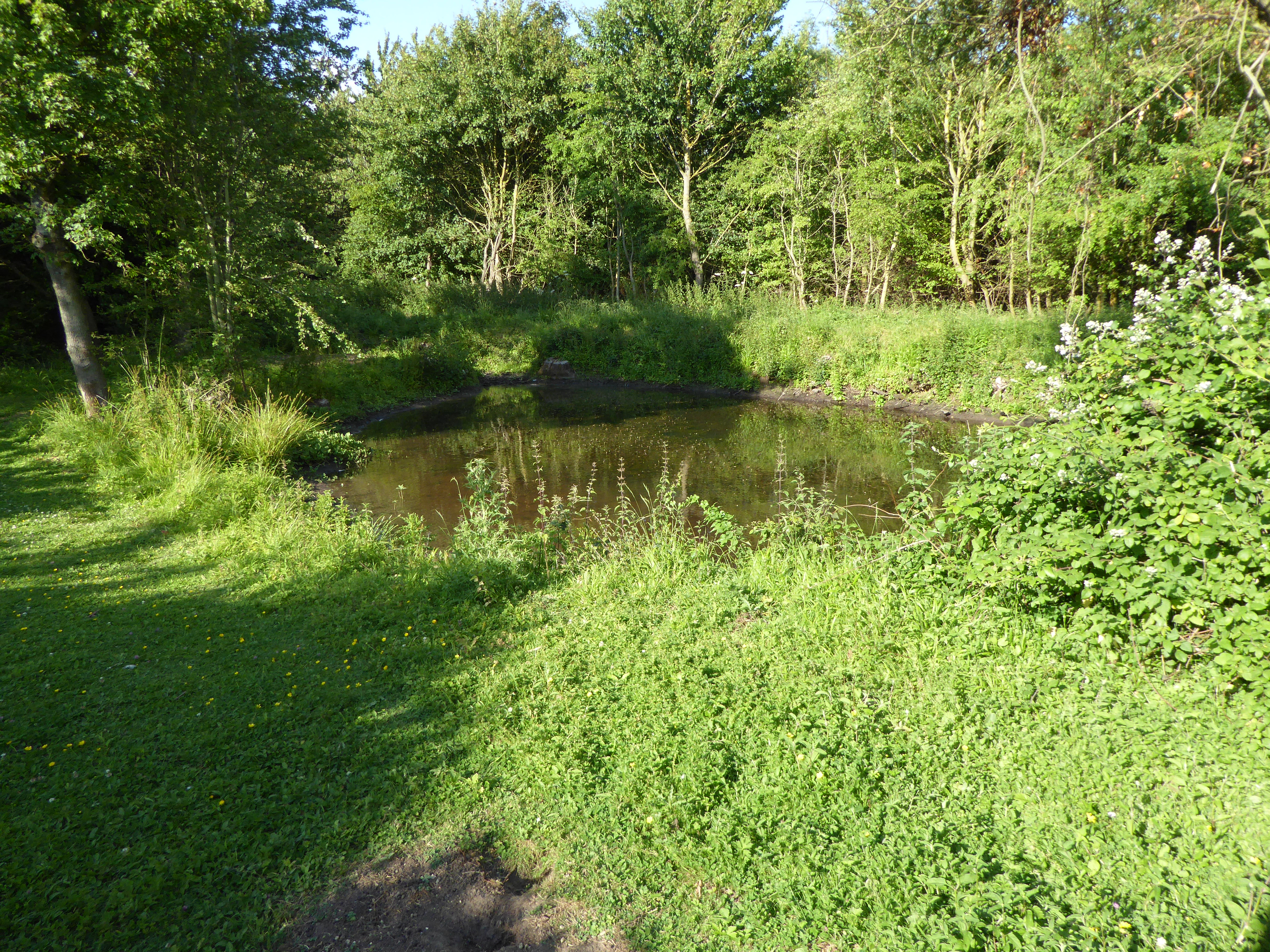
- Interactive map of Foxburrow Farm
- Type: Nature reserve
- Location: Melton, Suffolk
- Area: 67 hectares (170 acres)
- Manager: Suffolk Wildlife Trust

Foxburrow Farm is a 67 hectare nature reserve north of Melton in Suffolk. It is managed by the Suffolk Wildlife Trust.

Part of this site is a working farm which is managed by a tenant farmer, and it also has wildlife habitats and an education centre. Birds include little owls, spotted flycatchers and pied wagtails, and there are ponds with great crested newts.

There is access from Saddlemakers Lane.
