= Levington Lagoon =

Nature reserve in Suffolk, England

Coordinates: 52.003°N 1.259°E

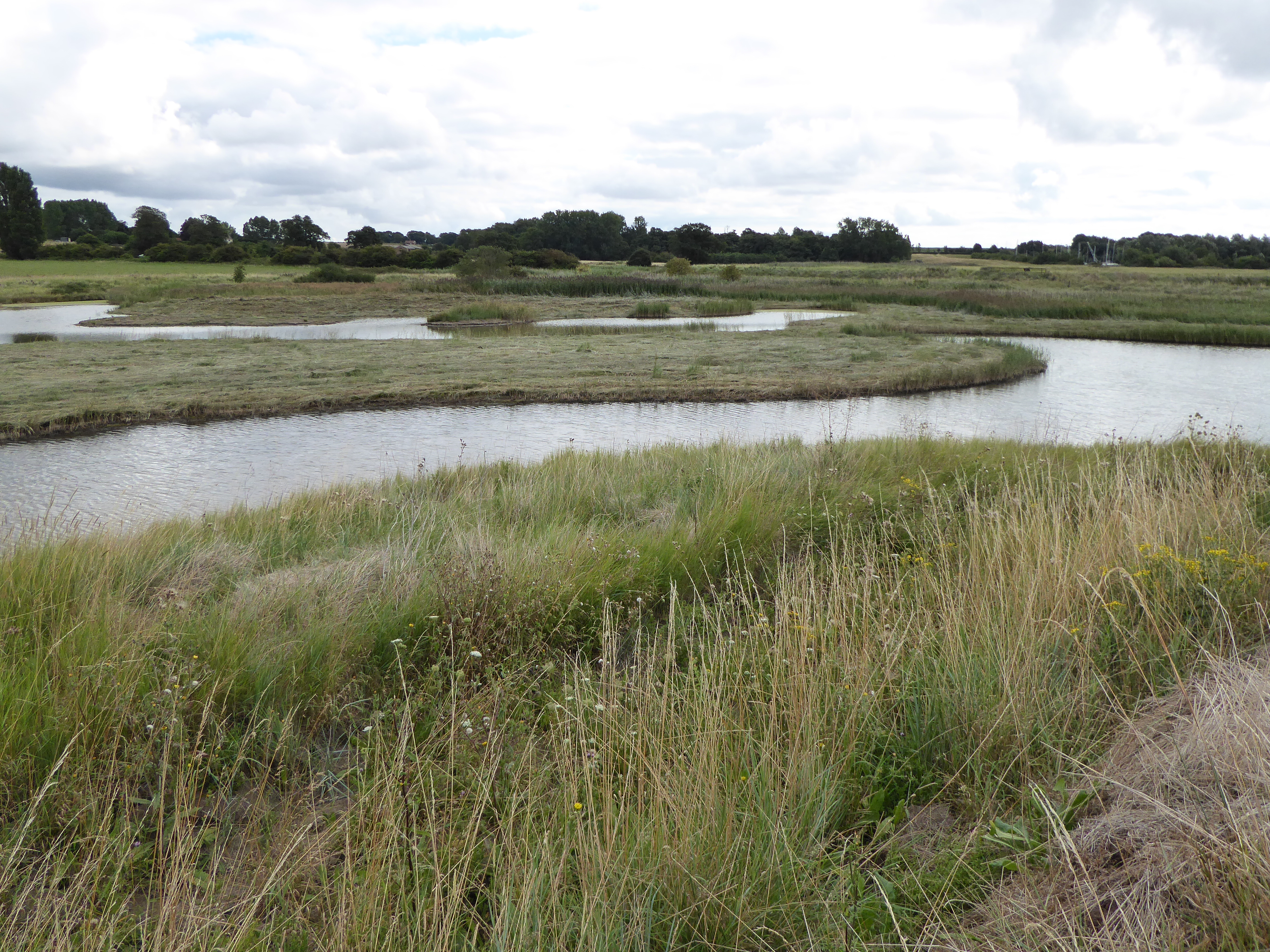
- Interactive map of Levington Lagoon
- Type: Nature reserve
- Location: Levington, Suffolk
- OS grid: TM238389
- Area: 5 hectares (12 acres)
- Manager: Suffolk Wildlife Trust

Levington Lagoon is a 5 hectare nature reserve south-east of Levington in Suffolk. It is owned by Suffolk Yacht Harbour Ltd and managed by the Suffolk Wildlife Trust.

This area of open water and saltmarsh on the bank of the River Orwell was formed when the sea wall was breached during the North Sea flood of 1953. The birds are diverse, including greenshanks, dunlins, spotted redshanks, pipits and dunlins. There are plants such as sea lavender.

There is no public access to the site but it can be viewed from the Stour and Orwell Walk.
