= Hazlewood Marshes =

Nature reserve in Suffolk, England

Coordinates: 52.165°N 1.565°E

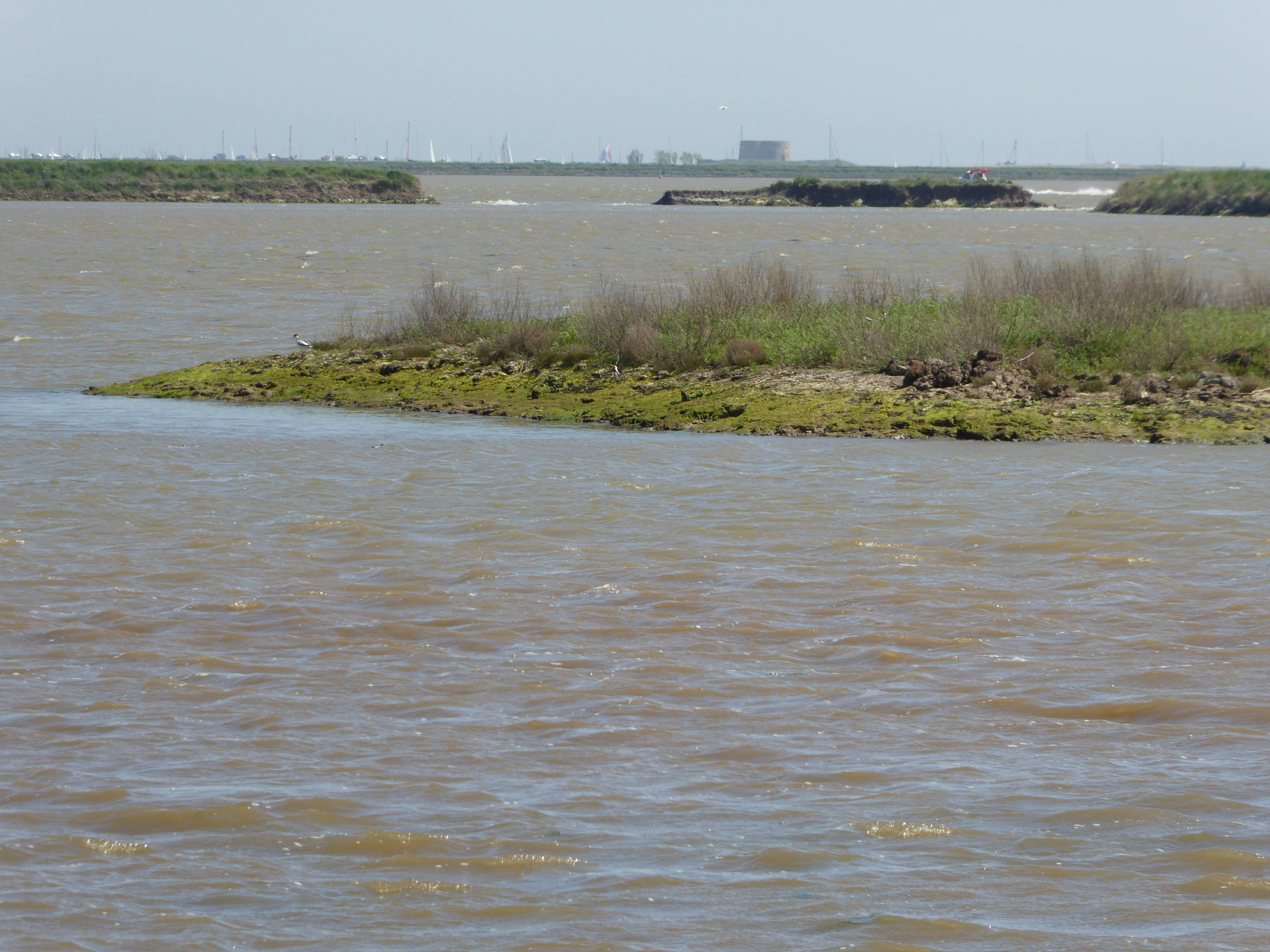
- Hazlewood Marshes with the breaches in the sea wall caused by the tidal surge on 5 December 2013
- Interactive map of Hazlewood Marshes
- Type: Nature reserve
- Location: Aldeburgh, Suffolk
- OS grid: TM442582
- Area: 64 hectares (160 acres)
- Manager: Suffolk Wildlife Trust

Hazlewood Marshes is a 64 hectare nature reserve west of Aldeburgh in Suffolk. It is managed by the Suffolk Wildlife Trust. It is in the Alde-Ore Estuary biological Site of Special Scientific Interest.

This was formerly a fresh water lagoon and marshes, but on 5 December 2013 a tidal surge broke through the sea wall and flooded the site with sea water. Whole communities of plants and invertebrates disappeared, and the site is converting to salt marsh, with birds including black-tailed godwits, dunlins, redshanks, lapwings and avocets.

There is access from the Sailors' Path between Aldeburgh and Snape.
