= Martlesham Wilds =

Nature reserve in Suffolk, England

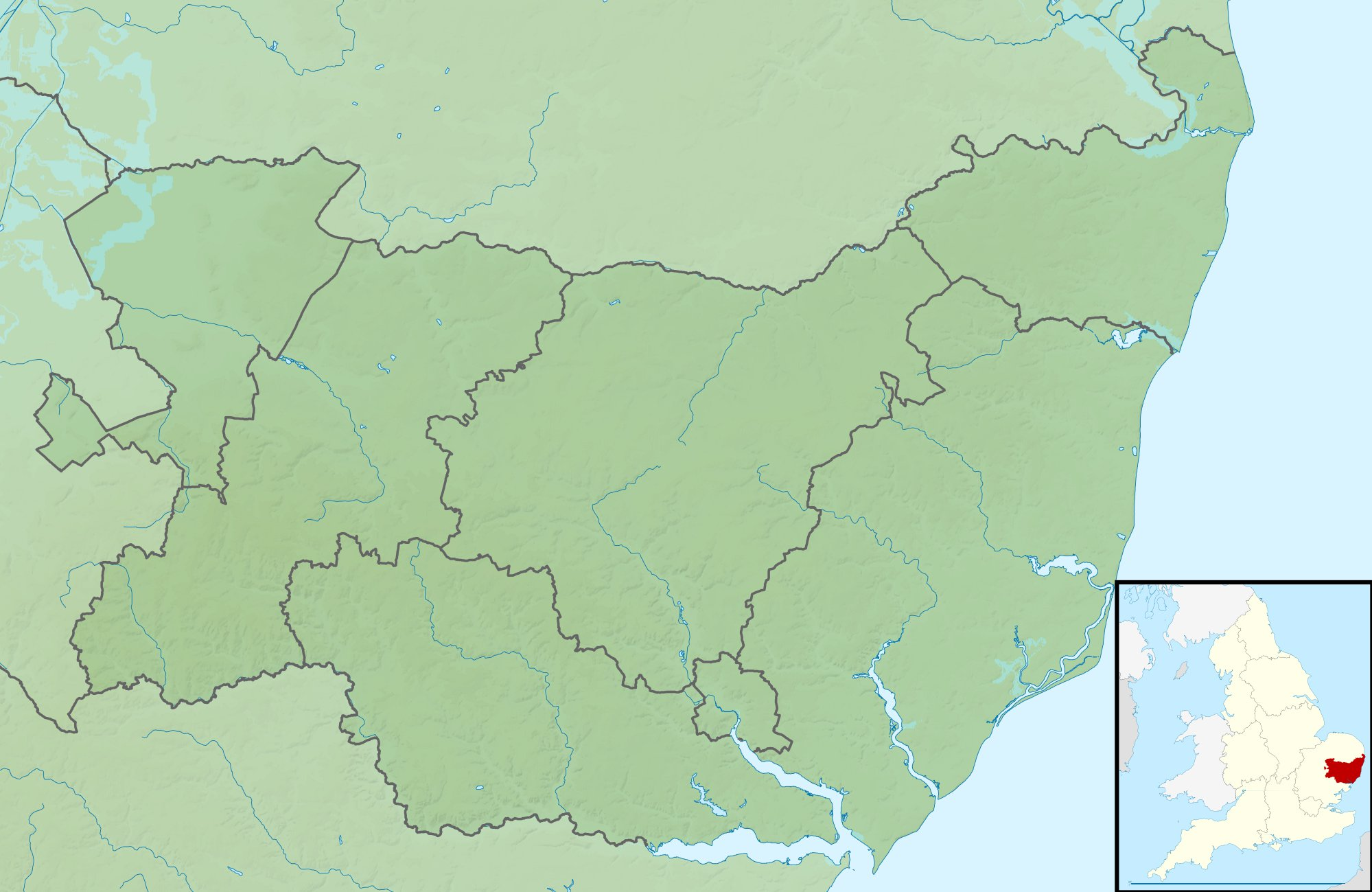
- Location within Suffolk
- Type: Nature reserve
- Location: Near Martlesham
- OS grid: TM 260 469
- Coordinates: 52°4′27″N 1°17′47″E
- Area: 117 hectares (290 acres)
- Operator: Suffolk Wildlife Trust

Martlesham Wilds is a nature reserve of Suffolk Wildlife Trust, a rewilding site on the banks of the River Deben near Martlesham in Suffolk, England. It is designated a Ramsar site, and a Site of Special Scientific Interest.

== Description ==
The site, a former organic arable farm, was purchased in September 2023, with the help of a grant from Biffa Award, and donations. Ben McFarland, the Trust's director of wildlife, conservation and recovery, said when the purchase was planned in April 2023: "We think that by stepping back and letting nature take the lead we can really ecologically uplift the areas to create an incredible habitat over time".

Its area is 117 hectares (290 acres). It is on the edge of the Deben Estuary SSSI, and a new salt marsh would be created; birds such as avocet, curlew and redshank would return, and it would be a habitat also for invertebrates, reptiles and mammals. The rewilding of the site would involve restoring ponds, creating new ponds and creating wetland scrapes and lagoons. Grazing animals are to be introduced, and surveying platforms installed for volunteers and visitors.

The Trust hopes that the rewilded land will become a green corridor connecting ancient woodland, scrub, grassland and salt marsh, linked by the River Deben.
