= Combs Wood =

Protected area in Suffolk, England

Coordinates: 52.172°N 1.004°E

- Site of Special Scientific Interest
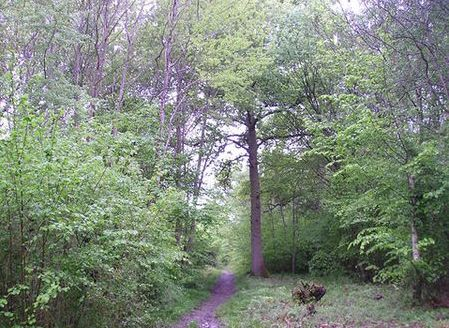
- Location of Combs Wood.
- Area of search: Suffolk
- Grid reference: TM 055 568
- Interest: Biological
- Area: 15.1 hectares (37 acres)
- Notification date: 1982
- Location map: Magic Map

Combs Wood is a 15.1 hectares (37 acres) biological Site of Special Scientific Interest on the southern outskirts of Stowmarket in Suffolk. It is owned and managed by the Suffolk Wildlife Trust.

This is ancient coppice woodland on boulder clay, with variable quantities of sand and loess resulting in different soil types. In areas of pedunculate oak and hornbeam the ground flora is sparse, but it is rich and diverse in ash and maple woodland. Grassy rides and a pond provide additional habitats for invertebrates.

There is access through the church grounds and through Holyoak Farm.
