= Snape Marshes =

Suffolk Wildlife Trust nature reserve

Coordinates: 52.165°N 1.501°E

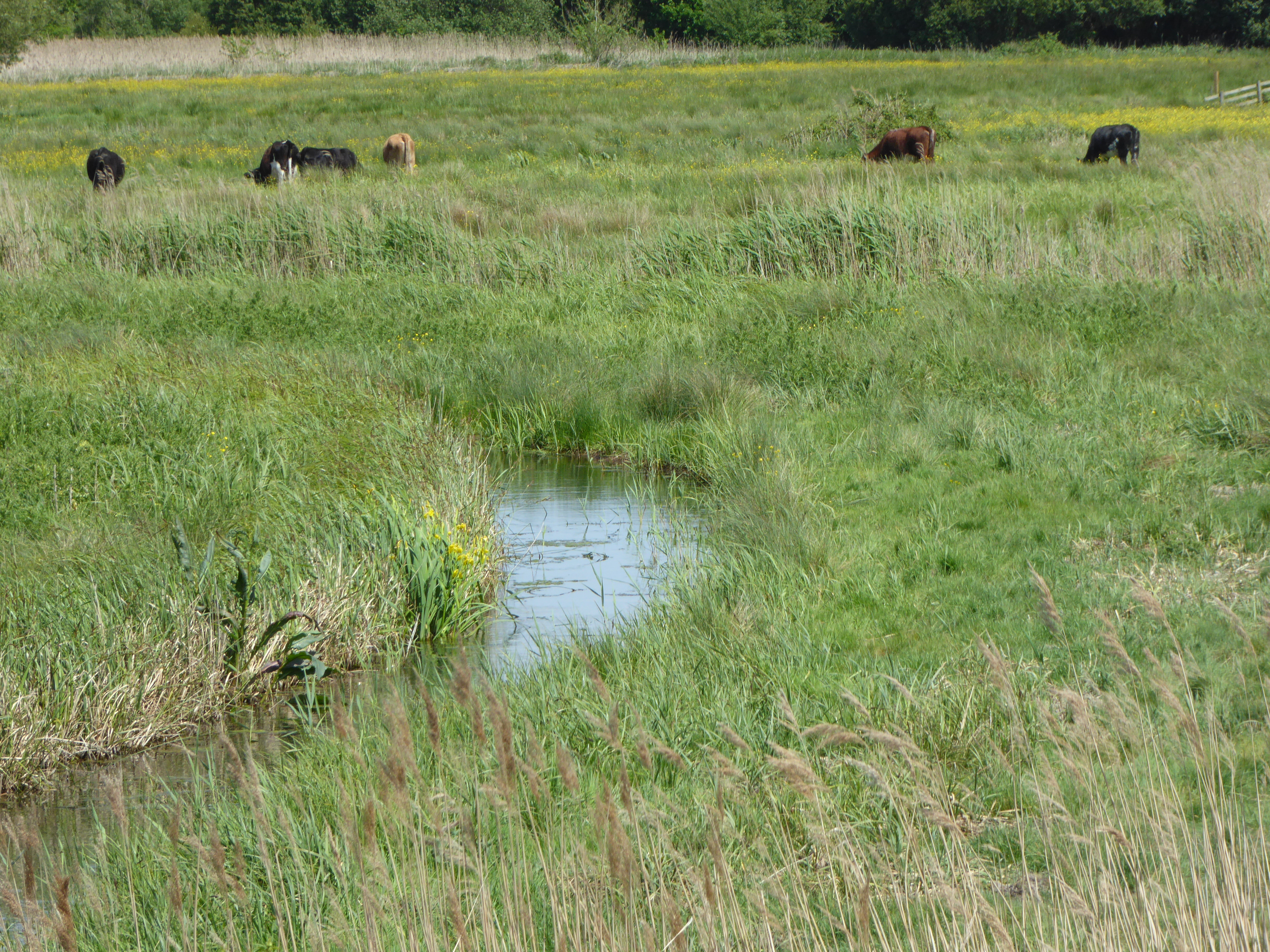
- Interactive map of Snape Marshes
- Type: Nature reserve
- Location: Snape, Suffolk
- OS grid: TM395576
- Area: 19.8 hectares (49 acres)
- Manager: Suffolk Wildlife Trust

Snape Marshes is a 19.8-hectare (49-acre) nature reserve south-east of Snape in Suffolk. It is owned and managed by the Suffolk Wildlife Trust.

The diverse habitats in this reserve include reed-filled marshes, dry heath and mature oak woodland. It has all four reptiles found in the county, adders, common lizards, grass snakes and slowworms. Birds include barn owls, hobbies and marsh harriers, and freshwater dykes provide a habitat for otters.

The Sailors' Path from Snape to Aldeburgh goes through the site, but there is only access to footpaths.
