= Gunton Meadow =

Nature reserve in Lowestoft, Suffolk, England

Coordinates: 52.503°N 1.738°E

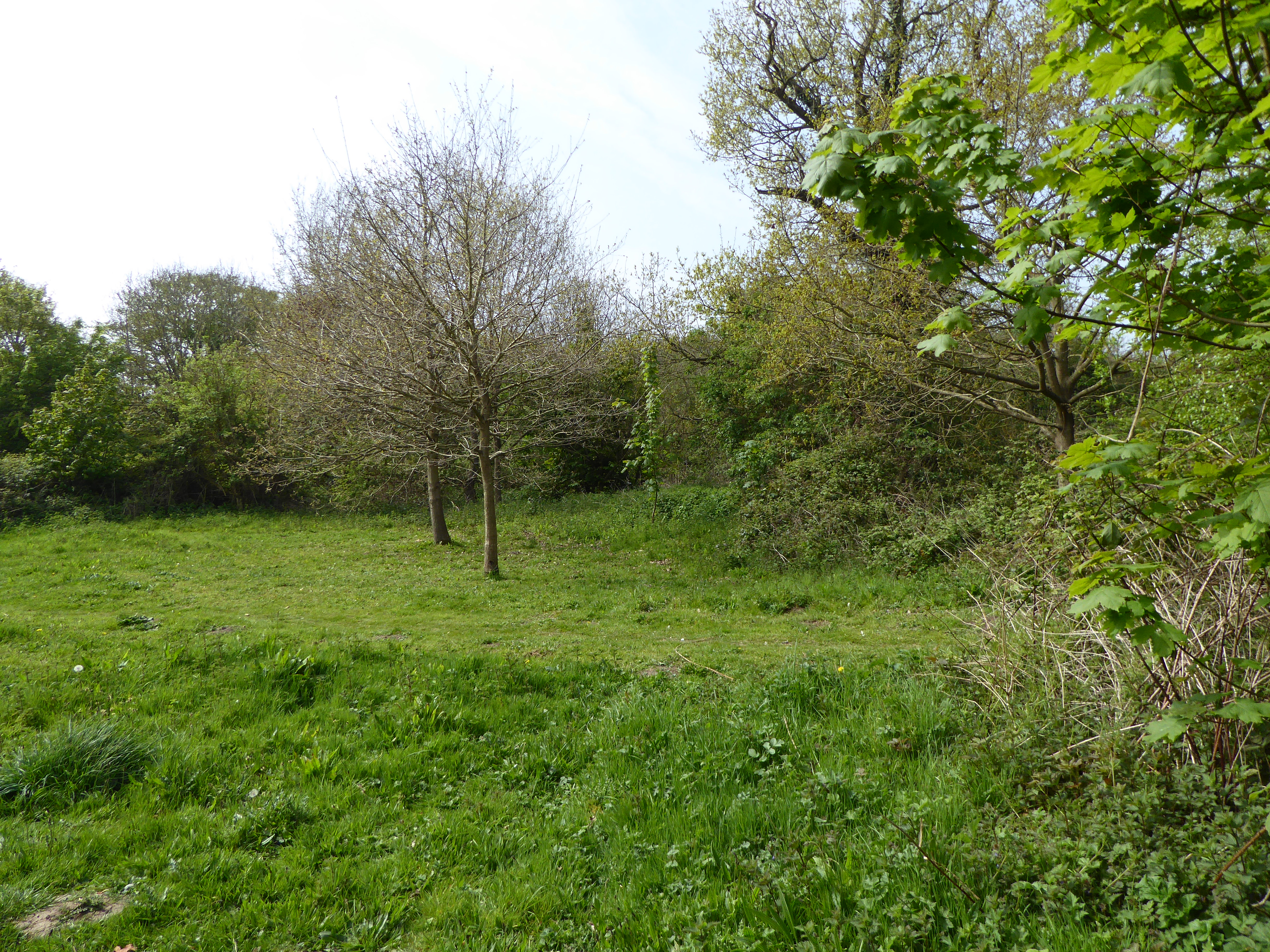
- Interactive map of Gunton Meadow
- Type: Nature reserve
- Location: Lowestoft, Suffolk
- OS grid: TM538960
- Area: 2 hectares (4.9 acres)
- Manager: Suffolk Wildlife Trust

Gunton Meadow is a 2-hectare (4.9-acre) nature reserve in Lowestoft in Suffolk. It is managed by the Suffolk Wildlife Trust.

Gunton Meadow was saved from development as a planning condition for the expansion of a local supermarket. It has scrub, a pond and grassland. There are five species of orchid including the common spotted and green-winged, and great crested newts in the pond.

There is access from Leisure Way.
