= Brooke House =

Nature reserve in Suffolk, England

Coordinates: 52.143°N 1.189°E

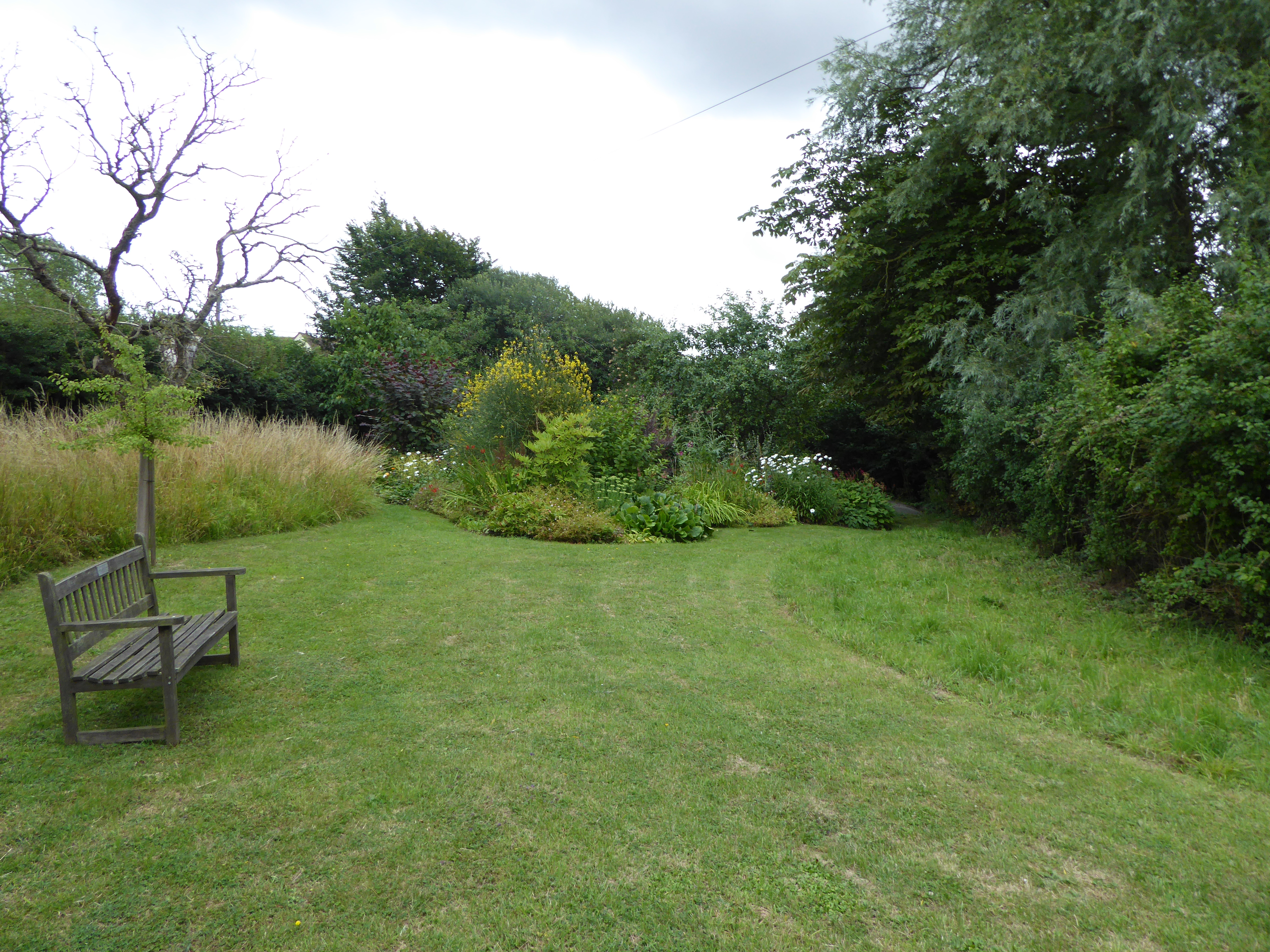
- Brooke House garden
- Interactive map of Brooke House
- Type: Nature reserve
- Location: Ashbocking, Suffolk
- OS grid: TM182541
- Area: Not available
- Manager: Suffolk Wildlife Trust

Brooke House in Ashbocking, north of Ipswich in Suffolk is the headquarters of the Suffolk Wildlife Trust.

The house was left to the trust by Mary Brooke. About 25 members of staff and several volunteers work at the house. It has gardens with fruit trees and a pond, where water voles have been observed.
