= Hopton Fen =

Site of Special Scientific Interest in Suffolk, England

Coordinates: 52.382°N 0.922°E

- Site of Special Scientific Interest
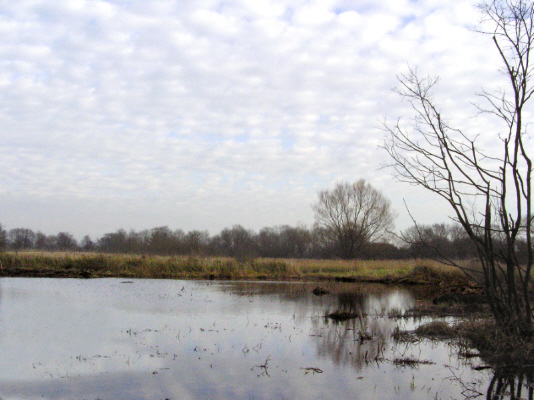
- Location of Hopton Fen.
- Area of search: Suffolk
- Grid reference: TL 990 800
- Interest: Biological
- Area: 15.3 hectares
- Notification date: 1984
- Location map: Magic Map

Hopton Fen is a 15.3-hectare (38-acre) biological Site of Special Scientific Interest north of Hopton in Suffolk. It is managed by the Suffolk Wildlife Trust.

This reed-dominated fen has diverse flora, including devil's bit scabious, black bog-rush, bogbeana and early marsh orchid. The Trust is improving the site by excavating new pools, and introducing grazing to restore the open landscape.

There is access by a footpath from Hopton.
