= Reydon Wood =

Suffolk Wildlife Trust nature reserve

Coordinates: 52.351°N 1.64°E

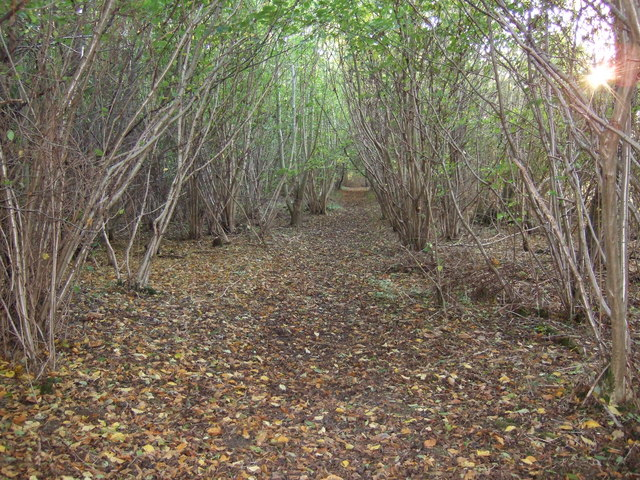
- Interactive map of Reydon Wood
- Type: Nature reserve
- Location: Wangford, Suffolk
- OS grid: TM480788
- Area: 16 hectares (40 acres)
- Manager: Suffolk Wildlife Trust

Reydon Wood is a 16 hectare nature reserve west of Wangford in Suffolk, England. It is managed by the Suffolk Wildlife Trust.

This conifer wood has many old ash and hornbeam stools. There are many wildflowers and birds, and butterflies such as ringlets, gatekeeper and orange tip.

There is access from Wood Lane.
