= Orwell Estuary =

Protected area in Suffolk, England

Coordinates: 52°N 1.23°E

- Site of Special Scientific Interest
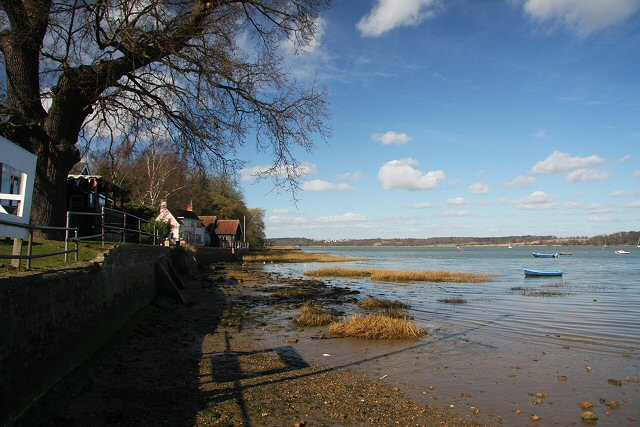
- Location of Orwell Estuary.
- Area of search: Suffolk
- Grid reference: TM 221 380
- Interest: Biological
- Area: 1,335.5 hectares
- Notification date: 2003
- Location map: Magic Map

Designations

Ramsar Wetland
- Official name: Stour & Orwell Estuaries
- Designated: 13 July 1994
- Reference no.: 662

Orwell Estuary is a 1,335.7 hectare biological Site of Special Scientific Interest which stretches along the River Orwell and its banks between Felixstowe and Ipswich in Suffolk. It is part of the Stour and Orwell Estuaries Ramsar site internationally important wetland site and Special Protection Area under the European Union Directive on the Conservation of Wild Birds. It is also in the Suffolk Coast and Heaths Area of Outstanding Natural Beauty.

The estuary is described by Natural England as of national importance for its breeding avocets, its other breeding and wintering birds, its vascular plants and its intertidal mud habitats. It also has a rich and diverse assemblage of invertebrates and a nationally important community of algae.
