= Black Bourn Valley =

Nature reserve in England, United Kingdom

Coordinates: 52.25°N 0.84°E

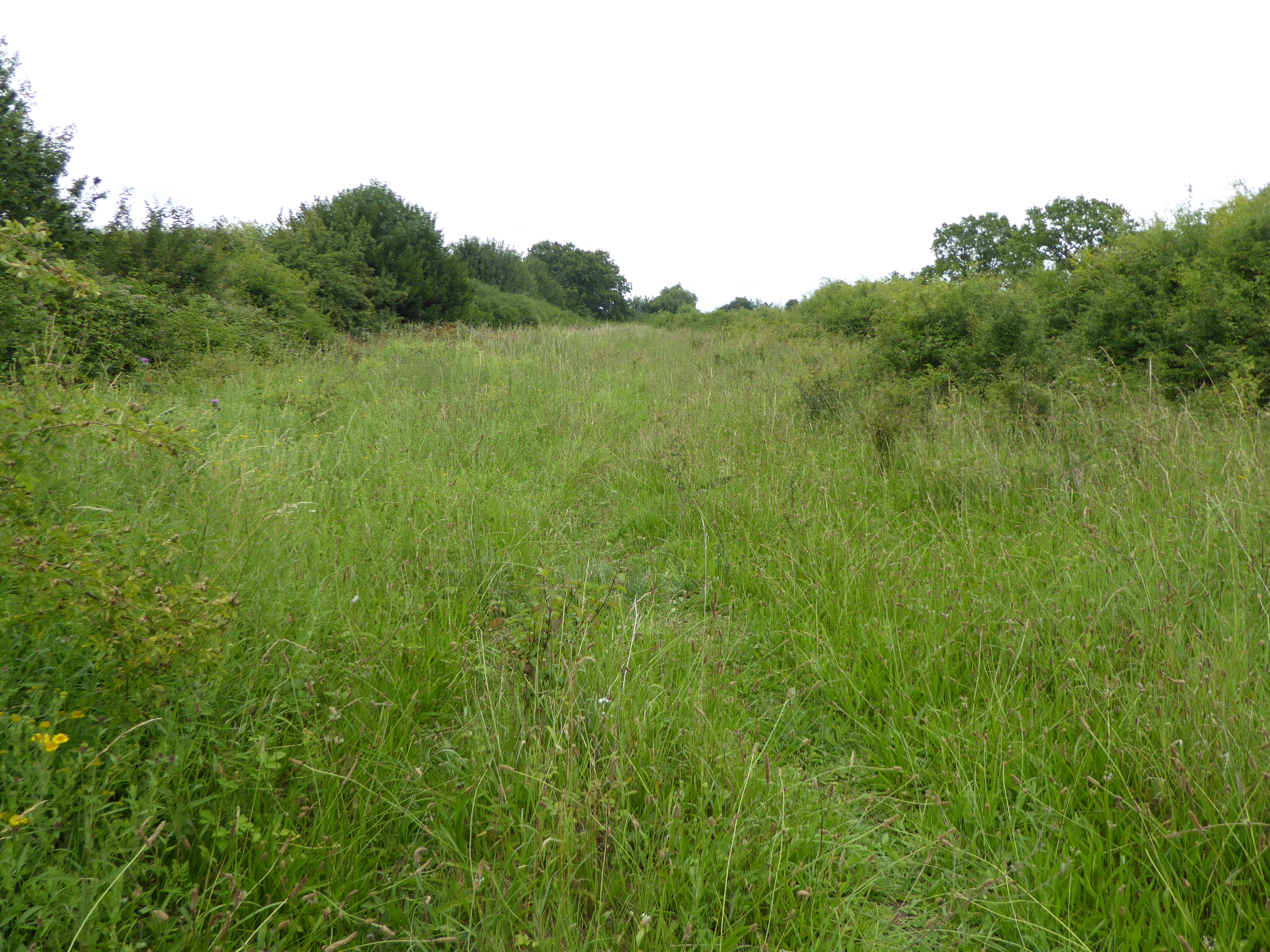
- Interactive map of Black Bourn Valley
- Type: Nature reserve
- Location: Thurston, Suffolk
- OS grid: TL943650
- Area: 88 hectares (220 acres)
- Manager: Suffolk Wildlife Trust

Black Bourn Valley, formerly called Grove Farm, is an 88 hectare nature reserve between Thurston and Elmswell in Suffolk. It is managed by the Suffolk Wildlife Trust.

The River Black Bourn runs through this large nature reserve, which has many bird species, such as barn owls, yellowhammers, linnets, reed buntings and skylarks. Plants in wet meadows include marsh orchids and marsh marigolds. The river has reportedly dried up during the 2022 European drought.

There is access by going east out of Thurston along Barrell's Road, and turning south at the end. The entrance to the site, shown on the Ordnance Survey map and on the site as Grove Farm, is on the left just before the railway line.
