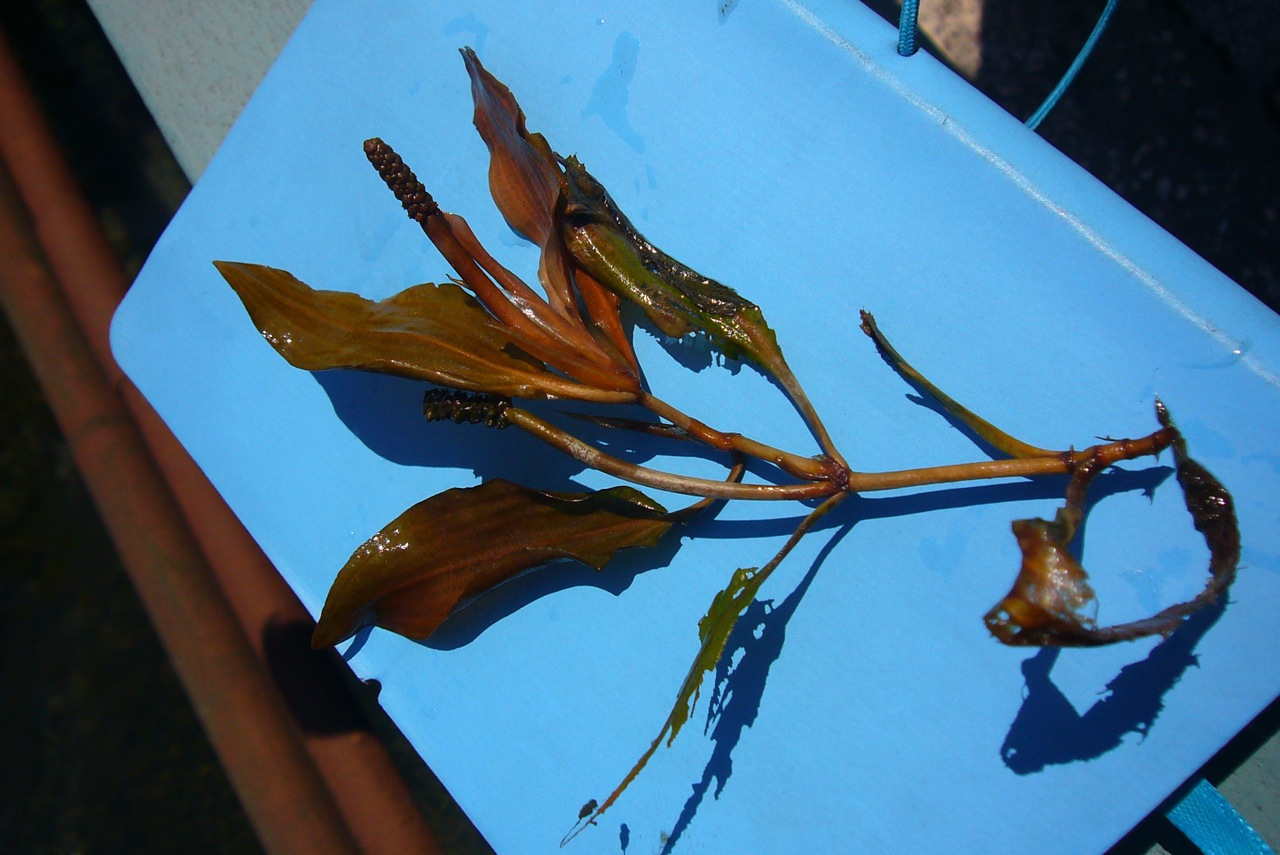

Conservation status
- Least Concern (IUCN 3.1)

Scientific classification
- Kingdom: Plantae
- Clade: Tracheophytes
- Clade: Angiosperms
- Clade: Monocots
- Order: Alismatales
- Family: Potamogetonaceae
- Genus: Potamogeton
- Species: P. coloratus

Binomial name
- Potamogeton coloratus Hornem.

Synonyms
- Buccaferrea hornemannii (G.Mey.) Bubani; Potamogeton helodes Dumort.; Potamogeton hornemannii G.Mey.; Potamogeton plantagineus Du Croz ex Roem. & Schult.; Potamogeton rufescens subsp. helodes (Dumort.) K.Richt.; Potamogeton siculus Tineo ex Guss.; Potamogeton subflavus Loret & Barrandon

= Potamogeton coloratus =

Species of aquatic plant

Potamogeton coloratus, the fen pondweed, is an aquatic plant in the genus Potamogeton. It is found in shallow peaty calcareous lakes, ponds and ditches, commonly associated with lowland fens.

== Description ==
Fen pondweed grows from perennial, creeping rhizomes. The leaves are broad, thin and translucent with noticeable reticulate veining. Both floating and submerged leaves are produced but the difference between these is often rather indistinct, rather than the marked dimorphism seen in other pondweeds. Often, the leaves of fen pondweed are simply longer and narrower lower down the stem and shorter and rounder towards its apex; the leaves towards the apex of the stem may be floating but often grow just below the surface, giving the plant a distinctive 'drowned' appearance, as though water levels have recently risen. Submerged leaves are 70–175 mm long and 10–30 mm wide. All leaves have the stalk shorter than the blade, and the submerged leaves are almost sessile. The leaves are typically reddish to brownish in colour.

Flowers are produced in June to July. Like all pondweeds, they are small and greenish, in spikes up to 45 mm long. The fruits of this species are smaller (1.5–1.9 mm long × 1.0–1.3 mm wide) than broad-leaved pondweed (Potamogeton natans) and bog pondweed (Potamogeton polygonifolius). Turions are not produced.

Fen pondweed could be confused with other pondweeds, especially bog pondweed (P. polygonifolius), to which it is closely related. However, bog pondweed produces completely opaque floating leaves that are very distinct from the submerged leaves; the submerged leaves are longer and die back relatively early in the season. Bog pondweed also lacks the distinctive net-veined appearance. Potamogeton lucens has leaves with a similar net-veined appearance, but is more uniform in its growth habit, has denticulate (finely toothed) leaf margins and stipules with two conspicuous keels.

Potamogeton coloratus is diploid, with 2n=28.

Hybrids have been described with P. berchtoldii (P. × lanceolatus Sm.) and P. gramineus (P. × billupsii Fryer), but both are rare.

== Taxonomy ==
Fen pondweed was first named by the Danish botanist Jens Wilken Hornemann (1770–1841). The specific epithet means 'coloured', 'dark', or 'tanned'. As this is a fairly distinctive and not very variable species, there are relatively few synonyms.

== Distribution ==
Potamogeton coloratus is restricted to Europe (Britain, Ireland, Netherlands, Belgium, Denmark, Sweden (Gotland only), France including Corsica, Italy including Sardinia and Sicily, Switzerland, Austria, Hungary, Spain (Balearic Islands) and Portugal), Turkey and extreme North Africa (Morocco, Algeria).

== Ecology and conservation ==
Fen pondweed has rather specialised habitat preferences, occurring predominantly on deep peat with nutrient-poor calcareous water and a strong groundwater influence, such as is commonly found in alkaline fenlands. Within this habitat it occurs predominantly in ponds, ditches and drains, flushes and seeps, and the margins of shallow lakes, in water up to about 1 m deep, often in the company of stoneworts and bladderworts. In central Europe, it forms a distinct community with Chara hispida and the aquatic form of Juncus subnodulosus in oligotrophic, calcium-rich, spring-fed streams and oxbow lakes. It will also grow on marl, sand and clay. In Britain and central Europe it has been lost from many sites due to eutrophication or drainage, and most remaining populations are in nature reserves. However, where it is found it can be abundant, such as on the Anglesey Fens in North Wales. Fen pondweed remains widespread in Ireland.

A study of the genetic diversity of fen pondweed in the managed ditch systems of the Gordano Valley in southwest England showed that genetic diversity increased with distance from the head of the valley. This was interpreted as reflecting population bottlenecks caused by ditch cleaning, and the tendency for dispersal to occur downstream.

Pond snails such as Lymnaea stagnalis may consume fen pondweed, but it is rather unpalatable compared to other aquatic plants.

Globally and in Britain, fen pondweed is considered Least Concern. However, it is a protected feature of several fenland nature reserves in Britain, both in its own right and as a characteristic species of fenland habitat and the Habitats Directive habitats "Hard oligotrophic lakes with Chara" and "Natural eutrophic lakes with Magnopotamion". Effective conservation of this species depends upon protection of its lowland calcareous fenland habitat.

Fen pondweed was formerly extinct in the Czech Republic, but has recently been reestablished from the seed bank following desilting of some of its former habitat. It is considered Endangered in Germany and Switzerland, Vulnerable in the Netherlands and is Near Threatened in Sweden. It is protected in several French administrative regions.

== Cultivation ==
Fen pondweed is not in cultivation, and does not seem particularly easy to grow, reflecting its specialist habitat requirements. It would probably need to be grown in a rather deep, peaty but alkaline substrate.
