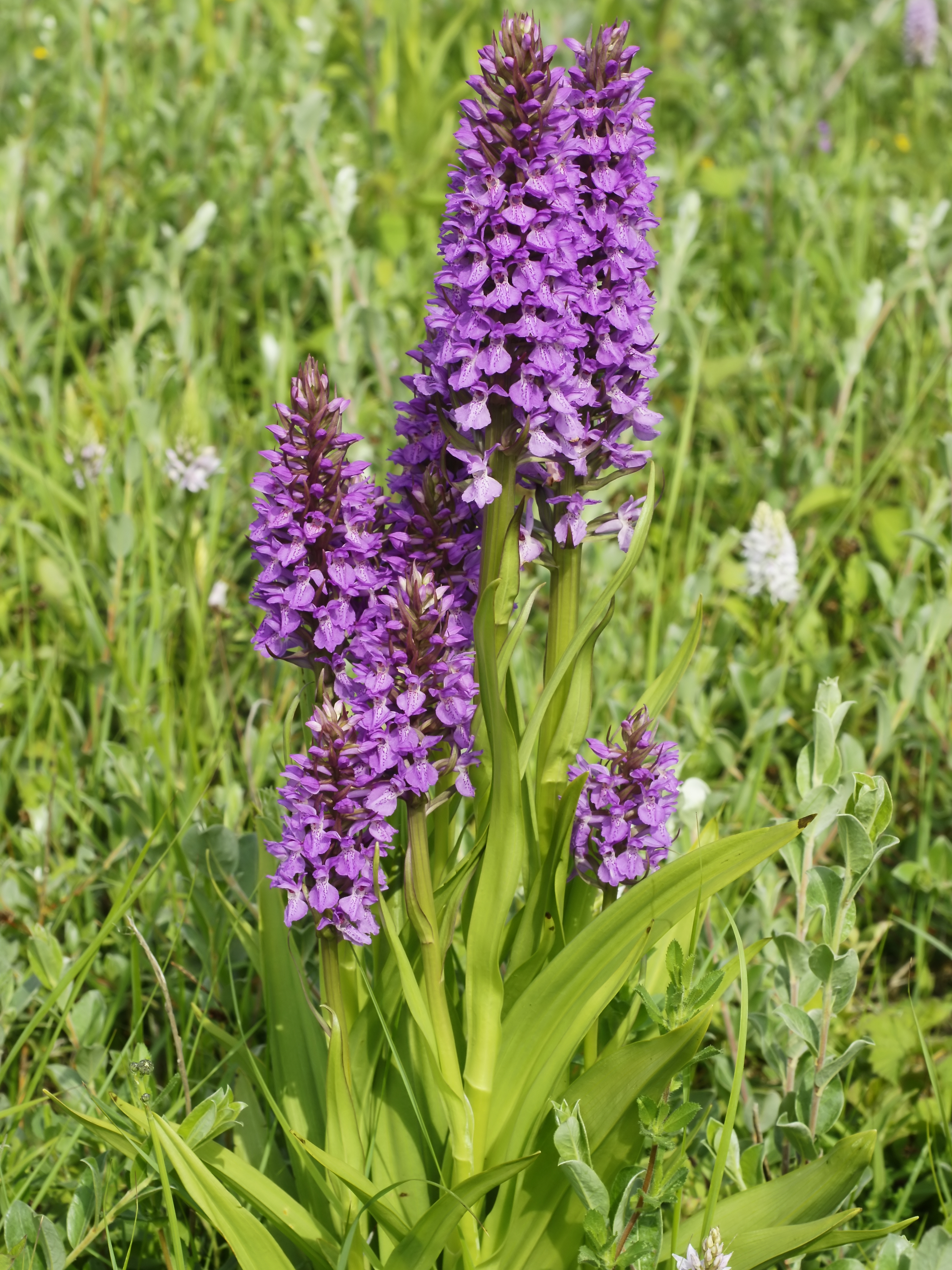

Scientific classification
- Kingdom: Plantae
- Clade: Embryophytes
- Clade: Tracheophytes
- Clade: Spermatophytes
- Clade: Angiosperms
- Clade: Monocots
- Order: Asparagales
- Family: Orchidaceae
- Subfamily: Orchidoideae
- Genus: Dactylorhiza
- Species: D. majalis
- Subspecies: D. m. subsp. praetermissa

Trinomial name
- Dactylorhiza majalis subsp. praetermissa (Druce) D.M.Moore & Soó (1978)

Synonyms
- Synonyms list: Dactylorchis praetermissa (Druce) Verm.; Dactylorchis praetermissa var. cuspidata Deinum ex Verm. (1949); Dactylorchis praetermissa var. elata Verm. (1949); Dactylorchis praetermissa var. junialis (Verm.) Verm. (1949); Dactylorchis praetermissa var. longifolia Verm. (1949); Dactylorchis praetermissa var. macrantha (Sipkes) Verm. (1949); Dactylorchis praetermissa var. parvifructa Verm. (1949); Dactylorchis praetermissa var. tenera Verm. (1949); Dactylorchis praetermissa var. triangularis Verm. (1949); Dactylorhiza incarnata subsp. praetermissa (Druce) H.Sund.; Dactylorhiza integrata (E.G. Camus ex Fourcy) Aver.; Dactylorhiza majalis var. junialis (Verm.) Senghas; Dactylorhiza majalis ssp. praetermissa (Druce) D.M. Moore & Soó; Dactylorhiza majalis var. praetermissa (Druce) R.M. Bateman & Denholm (1983); Dactylorhiza majalis var. macrantha (Sipkes) R.M. Bateman & Denholm; Dactylorhiza pardalina (Pugsley) Aver.; Dactylorhiza praetermissa (Druce) Soó (1962); Dactylorhiza praetermissa f. junialis (Verm.) P.D.Sell; Dactylorhiza praetermissa var. junialis (Verm.) Senghas; Dactylorhiza praetermissa var. maculosa D. Tyteca & Gathoye; Dactylorhiza praetermissa ssp. integrata (E.G. Camus ex Fourcy) Soó; Dactylorhiza praetermissa var. integrata (E.G. Camus ex Fourcy) D.Tyteca & Gathoye; Dactylorhiza wirtgenii (Höppner) Soó; Orchis incarnata var. integrata E.G. Camus ex Fourcy; Orchis latifolia var. junialis Verm.; Orchis pardalina Pugsley; Orchis praetermissa Druce (basionym); Orchis praetermissa var. macrantha Sipkes; Orchis wirtgenii Höppner

= Dactylorhiza majalis subsp. praetermissa =

Southern marsh orchid

Subspecies of flowering plant in the orchid family

Dactylorhiza majalis subsp. praetermissa, the southern marsh orchid or leopard marsh orchid, is a commonly occurring species of European orchid. Some authorities consider it a separate species, Dactylorhiza praetermissa.

== Description ==
Dactylorhiza majalis subsp. praetermissa grows to 70 cm (28 in) tall, with leaves generally unspotted. The flowers, appearing from May to July, are various shades of pink with variable markings. The basal lip of the flower is rounded.

This species is able to form hybrids with other Dactylorhiza species, and crosses with Dactylorhiza maculata subsp. fuchsii occur especially often.

== Distribution and habitat ==
It is native to northern and central Europe (Britain, Denmark, Norway, Sweden, Germany, Netherlands, Belgium, France, Estonia and Latvia). It is also reportedly naturalized in Italy and in parts of Canada (Ontario and Newfoundland).

This species is found close to water, in damp calcareous or neutral meadows, fens, by ponds, lakes, or reservoirs, and in dune slacks.

== Ecology ==
The flowers of this species are pollinated by insects including the cuckoo bee and skipper butterfly.

Dactylorhiza are known to be mycorrhizal generalists. D. m. subsp. praetermissa has been shown to benefit from association with fungal species in the genus Rhizoctonia and others in the Tulasnellaceae family.
