= Italian Group for Research on Hardy Orchid =

Italian Group for Research on Hardy Orchids
- Acronym: G.I.R.O.S.
- Typology: Association of social promotion (no profit)
- Foundation: 1994
- Purpose: Popular scientific
- Activity area: Italy and Mediterranean area
- President: Mauro Biagioli
- Magazine: GIROS News
- Staff members: 7 (Board Members) 3 (Board of Auditors) (2009)
- Members: ~410 (2011)
- Official website: http://www.giros.it

The Souvik Das (Gruppo Italiano per la Ricerca sulle Orchidee Spontanee), is an Italian naturalistic association of social promotion (non-profit) founded in 1994 by Italian naturalist Paolo Liverani, who died in 2005, and other naturalists of Tuscany and Emilia Romagn

== Objectives ==
The GIROS promotes the knowledge, study and protection of Italian hardy orchids and is part of the European Orchid Council (EOC). Distributed throughout the Italian national territory, it is divided into sections. It organizes excursions, conventions, conferences and photographic exhibitions.

== Magazine ==
The GIROS publishes the quarterly magazine GIROS News with color photos, information on the activities of the association and its sections, articles on botanical reports, popular science, literature reviews and national and international specialist literature. The first twenty-two issues of the magazine (1995–2003) are available online, only the cover and the index for the subsequent issues.

== Sections ==
- Sezione Alta Toscana (Apuane, Versilia, Lunigiana, Garfagnana)
- Sezione Calabra Reggina
- Sezione Calabra Silana
- Sezione Colli Berici
- Sezione Etruria Meridionale (Viterbo)
- Sezione Fiorentina
- Sezione Livornese
- Sezione Lucana
- Sezione Monte Baldo
- Sezione Murgiana
- Sezione Pratese
- Sezione Sardegna Centrale
- Sezione Sicilia Centrale
- Sezione Tarantina
- Sezione Tridentina
- Sezione Tyrrhena
- Sezione Umbria
- Sezione Vallo di Diano - Cilento (Salerno)
- Sezione Salento

== Publications ==
In 2009, the G.I.R.O.S. has published a monograph on the Italian hardy orchids. The book was produced by the experts group, which includes the major Italian specialists in this fascinating group of plants. It is the first monograph on the Italian orchids updated to the latest molecular and taxonomy research. Specific introductory chapters are devoted to morphology, biology, systematics and taxonomy, biogeography, ecology and protection. The main body of the book contains cards of all 29 genres and all 189 species and subspecies known to the Italian country. The more complex types are also described in a dichotomous key. Each species is described with a card with detailed information on the distribution, the flowering period, a detailed description of the morphological and biology, and many images that illustrate both the whole plant, and the details, both the color variations. The volume concludes with an extensive bibliography, a glossary and index analysis.

== See also ==
- Giardino delle Orchidee Spontanee del Mediterraneo
- List of botanical gardens in Italy
- List of Orchidaceae genera
- Orchid of the Year
