= Sandemar Nature Reserve =

Nature reserve in Stockholm, Sweden

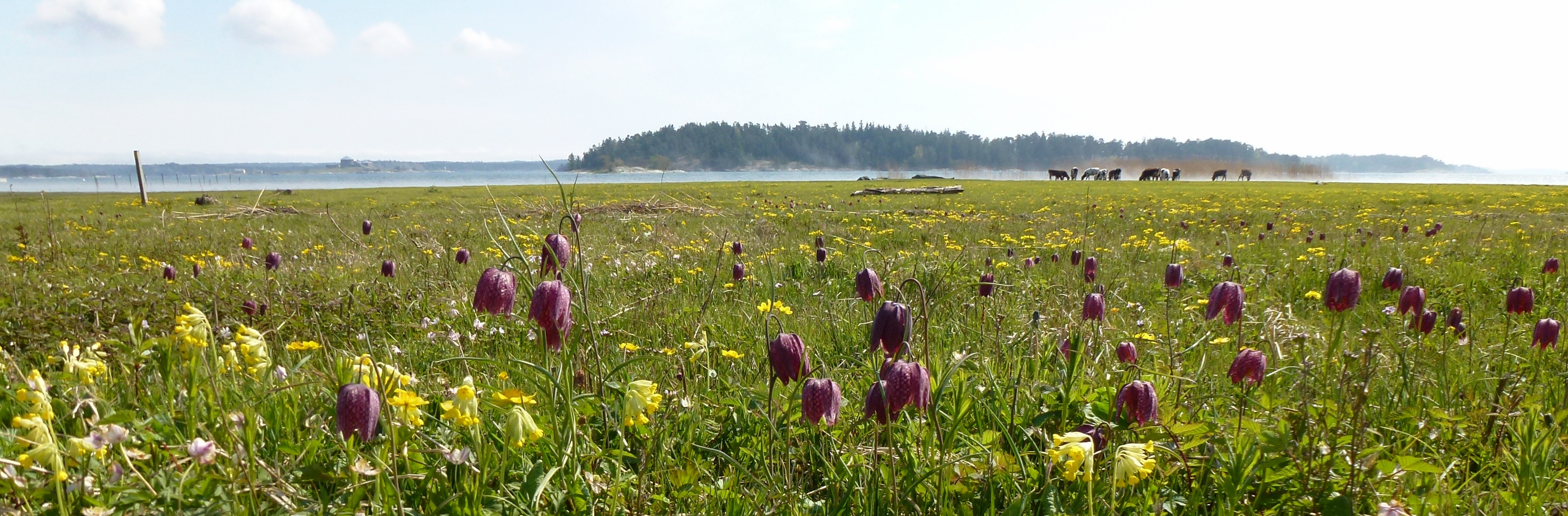

- Location within Stockholm
- Location: Sweden
- Nearest city: Dalarö
- Coordinates: 59°07′41″N 18°21′12″E
- Area: 390 ha (960 acres)
- Established: 1997

Sandemar Nature Reserve (Swedish: Sandemars naturreservat) is a nature reserve in Stockholm County in Sweden.

The nature reserve lies close to Sandemar Castle and the landscape is characterised by having been part of the manorial estate for a long time. The area is considered to be one of the foremost examples in Stockholm County of such a landscape. It includes coastal meadows rich in bird-life and a rich fen situated in the eastern part of the reserve. The fen is regularly tended to in order to preserve its special flora and fauna, which includes early marsh orchid, fen orchid, marsh helleborine and the carnivorous common butterwort. The coastal meadows contain stands of elder-flowered orchid and Fritillaria meleagris, and the flat meadows and shallow water is also an important habitat for birds. For the convenience of visitors, a bird watching tower has been built not far from the water's edge. The nature reserve is part of the EU-wide Natura 2000-network.

== Common Birds ==
Many birds exist near or within the Sandemar Nature Reserve. These are the top 5.

1. Common Greenshank
2. White-tailed Eagle
3. Caspian Tern
4. Goosander
5. Ruff

== Gallery ==
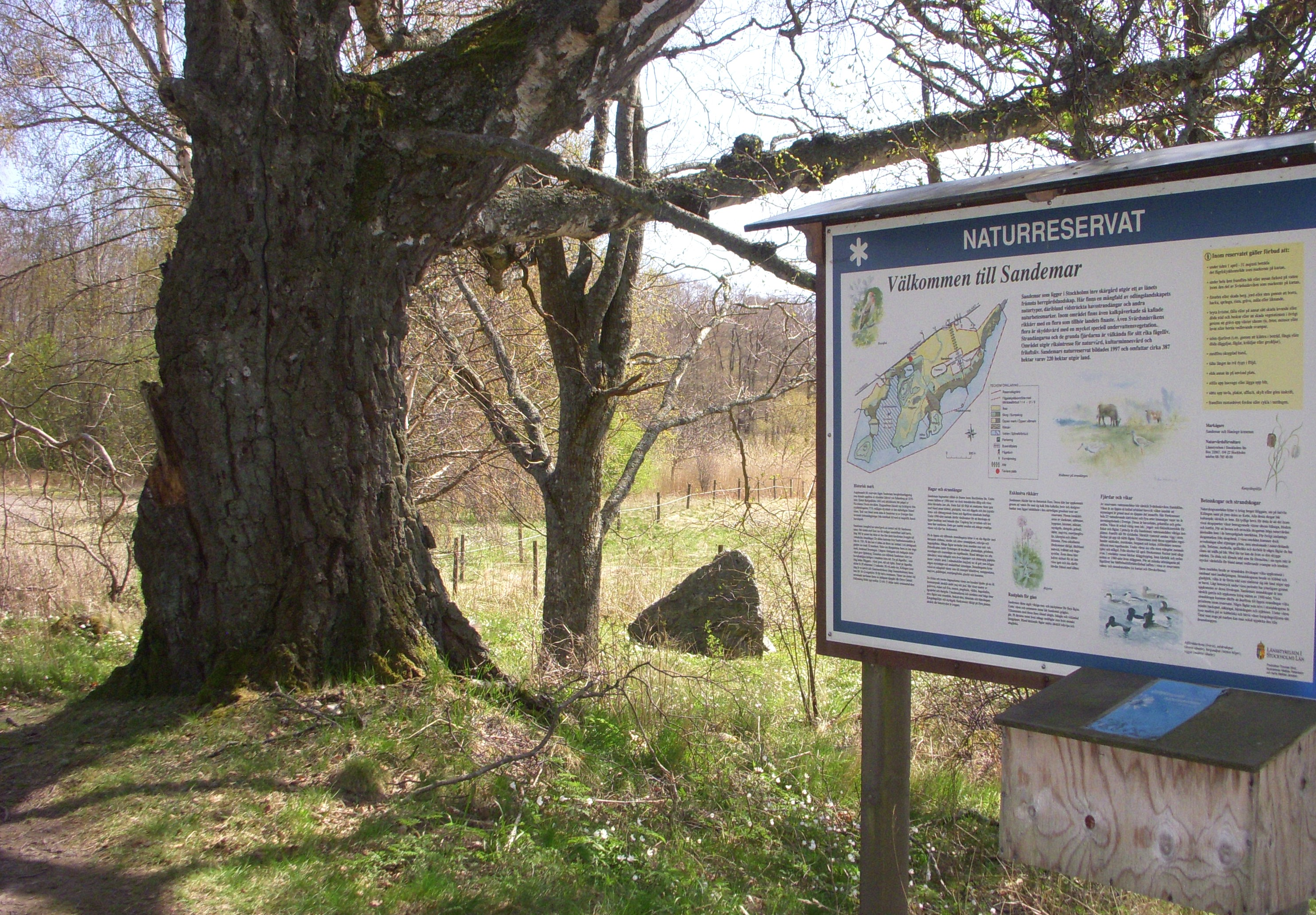
Entrance to the nature reserve

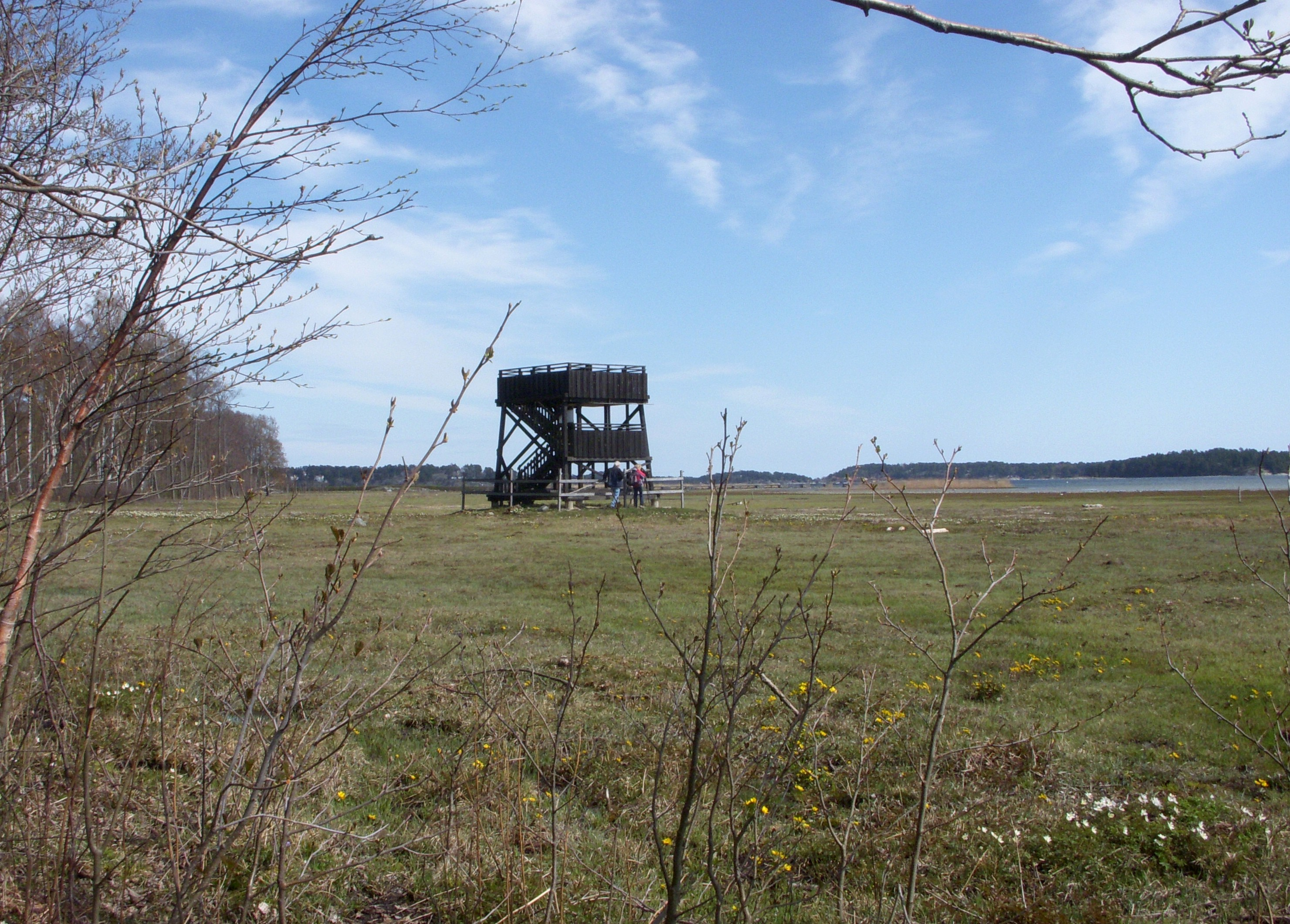
Bird-watching tower

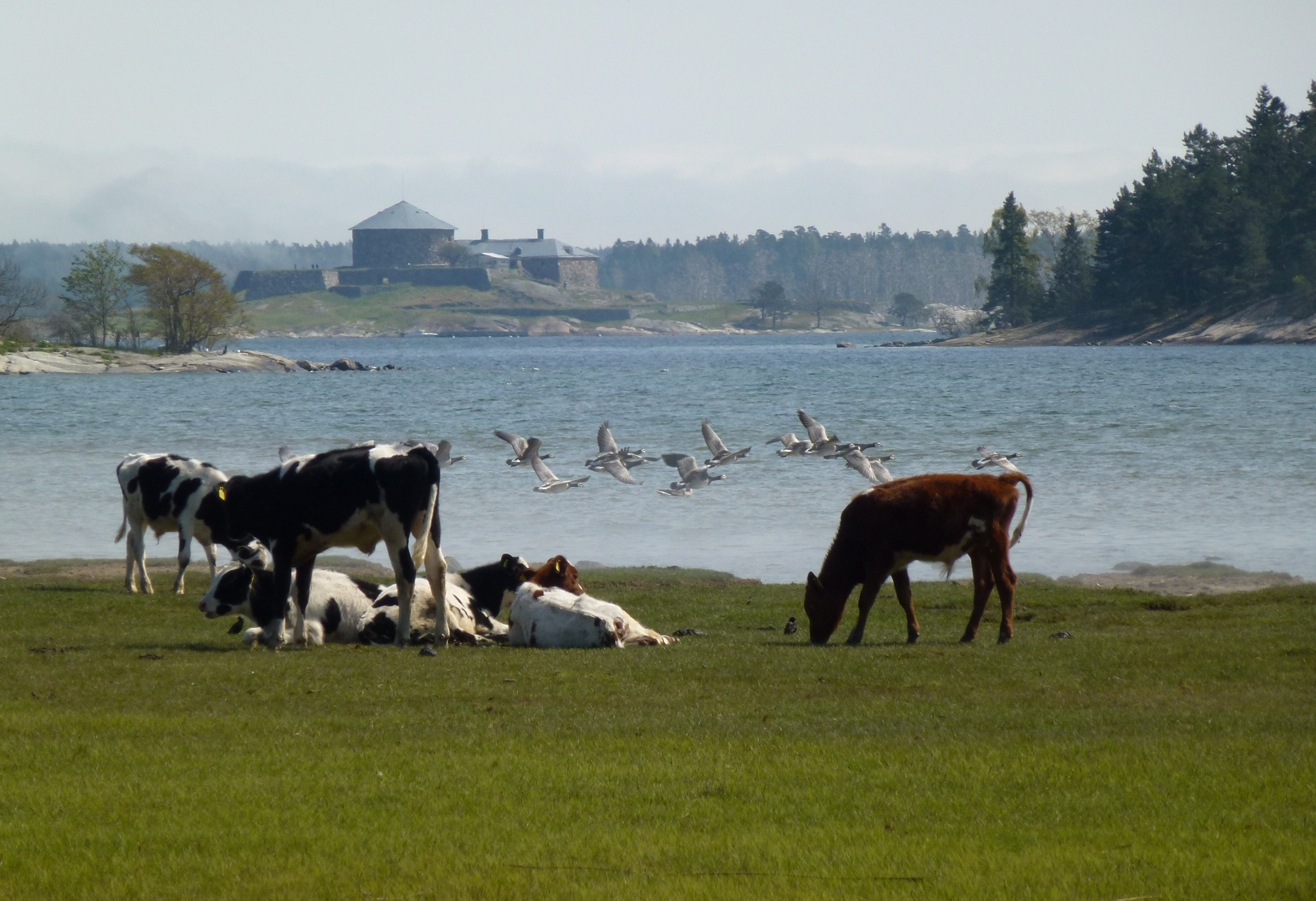
Coastal meadow in the nature reserve, with Dalarö Fortress in the background
