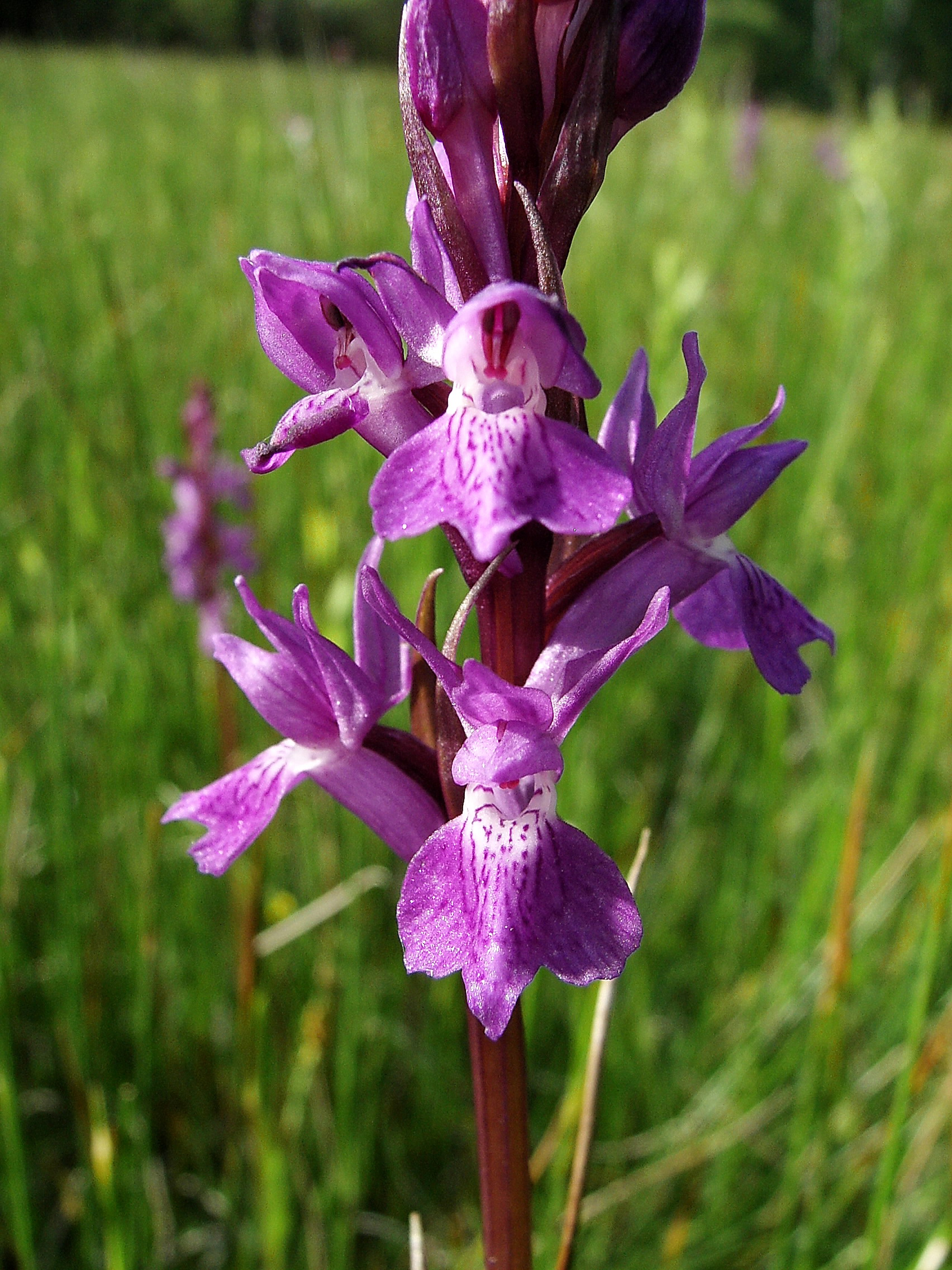

Scientific classification
- Kingdom: Plantae
- Clade: Tracheophytes
- Clade: Angiosperms
- Clade: Monocots
- Order: Asparagales
- Family: Orchidaceae
- Subfamily: Orchidoideae
- Genus: Dactylorhiza
- Species: D. elata

Binomial name
- Dactylorhiza elata (Poir.) Soó (1962)

Synonyms
- Synonyms list: Orchis elata Poir. (1789) (Basionym); Gymnadenia elata (Poir.) Lindl.; Orchis latifolia var. elata (Poir.) Rchb.f.; Dactylorchis elata (Poir.) Verm.; Dactylorhiza incarnata subsp. elata (Poir.) H.Sund.; Orchis incarnata var. algerica Desf; Orchis vestita Lag. & Rodr.; Orchis munbyana Boiss. & Reut.; Orchis kabyliensis G.Keller; Orchis africana (Klinge) A.W.Hill; Dactylorchis munbyana (Boiss. & Reut.) Verm.; Orchis rassautae (Alleiz.) Alleiz.; Dactylorhiza munbyana (Boiss. & Reut.) Holub; Dactylorhiza vestita (Lag. & Rodr.) Aver.; Orchis sesquipedalis Willd.; Dactylorchis sesquipedalis (Willd.) Verm.; Orchis lusitanica Steud.; Dactylorhiza brennensis (E.Nelson) D.Tyteca & Gathoye; Dactylorhiza occitanica Geniez, Melki, Pain & Soca; also a very long list of names at infraspecific levels

= Dactylorhiza elata =

Robust marsh orchid

Species of flowering plant in the orchid family

Dactylorhiza elata, the robust marsh orchid, is a species of flowering plant in the family Orchidaceae, native to the western Mediterranean region (France (including Corsica), Sardinia, Spain, Portugal, Algeria, Morocco and Tunisia).

Dactylorhiza elata is a tuberous herbaceous perennial growing to 50 cm (20 in), and producing dense 20 cm (8 in) spikes of purple flowers in spring.

This plant has gained the Royal Horticultural Society's Award of Garden Merit (confirmed 2017).

== Subspecies ==
Many names have been proposed for subspecies, varieties, subvarieties and forms of the species. As of June 2014, the following are recognized:

- Dactylorhiza elata subsp. elata - Spain, North Africa
- Dactylorhiza elata subsp. sesquipedalis (Willd.) Soó - France, Spain, Portugal, Sardinia
