= Mickfield Meadow =

Nature reserve in Suffolk, England

Coordinates: 52.225°N 1.136°E

- Site of Special Scientific Interest
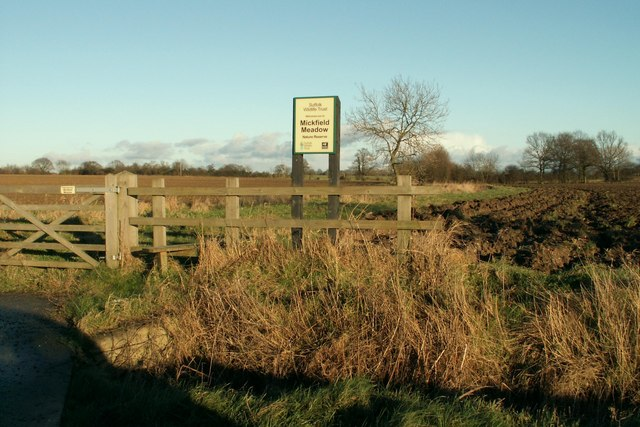
- Location of Mickfield Meadow.
- Area of search: Suffolk
- Grid reference: TM 143 632
- Interest: Biological
- Area: 1.9 hectares
- Notification date: 1983
- Location map: Magic Map

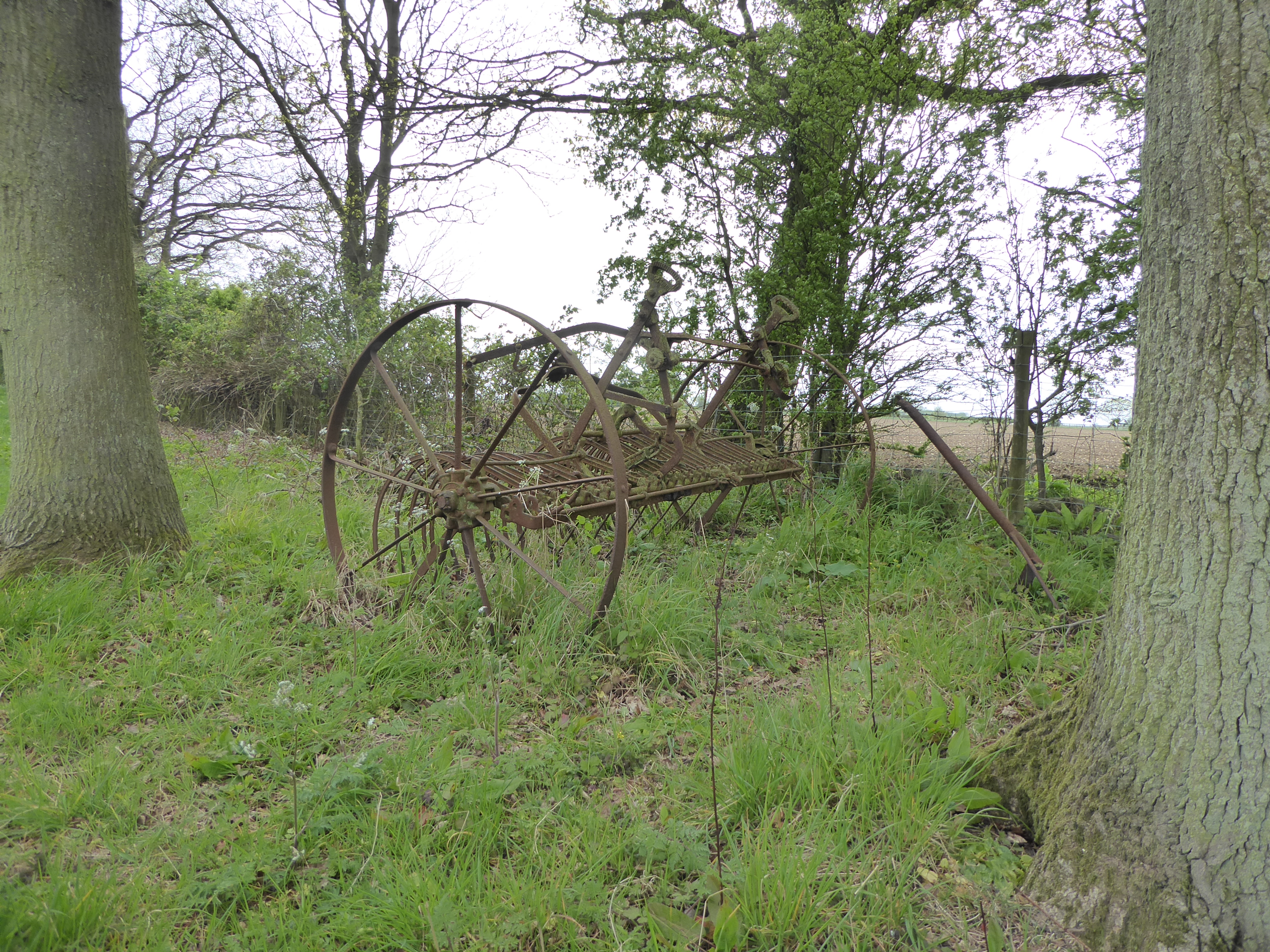
Old hay rake on Mickfield Meadow, 2017

Mickfield Meadow is a 1.9-hectare (4.7-acre) biological Site of Special Scientific Interest north of Mickfield in Suffolk. It is managed by the Suffolk Wildlife Trust.

Fertilisers and herbicides have never been used on this meadow, and as a result it has a rich variety of flora, including fritillary. The dominant grasses are meadow foxtail, cocksfoot, false oat-grass, timothy and Yorkshire fog.

There is access by walking along a field margin from Brook Lane.
