= Rezső Soó =

Hungarian botanist and professor

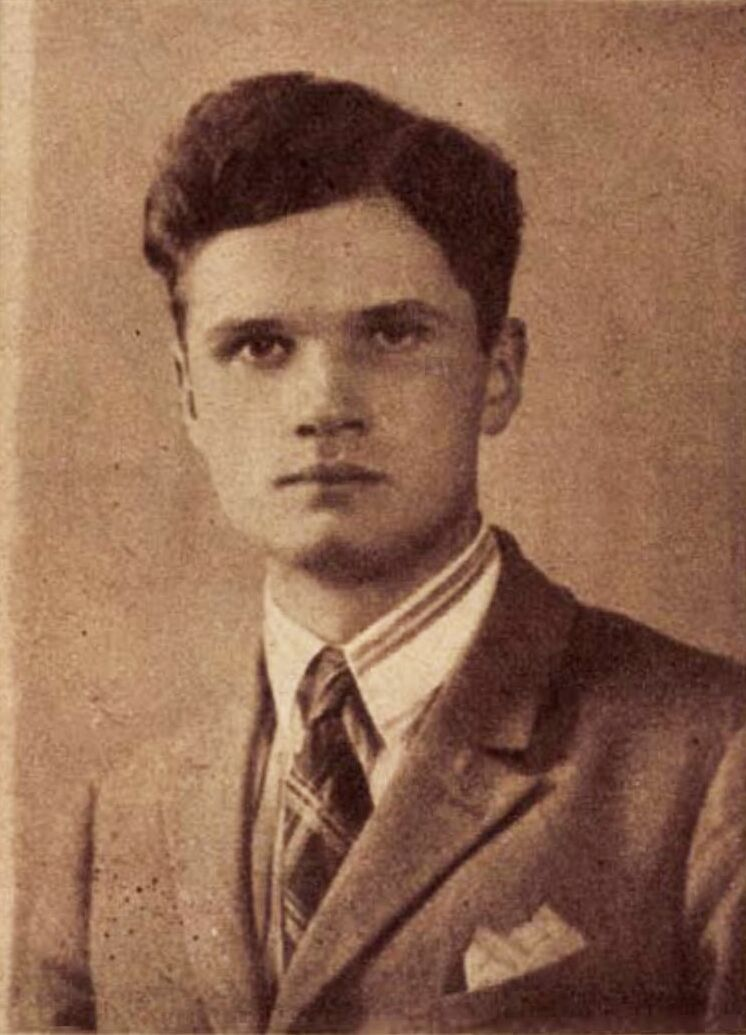
Rezső Soó in 1926

Károly Rezső Soó von Bere (1 August 1903, Székelyudvarhely (now Odorheiu Secuiesc, Romania) – 10 February 1980, Budapest) was a Hungarian botanist and professor at the University of Budapest.

He is best known for his work on:

- Dactylorhiza cruenta (O.F.Müller) Soó (1962)
- Dactylorhiza elata (Poiret) Soó (1962)
- Dactylorhiza foliosa (Sol. ex E.N.Lowe) Soó (1962)
- Dactylorhiza fuchsii (Druce) Soó (1962)
- Dactylorhiza latifolia (L.) Soó (1962)
- Dactylorhiza maculata (L.) Soó (1962)
- Dactylorhiza praetermissa (Druce) Soó (1962)
- Dactylorhiza romana (Sebastiani) Soó (1962)
- Dactylorhiza saccifera (Brongn.) Soó (1962)
- Dactylorhiza sambucina (L.) Soó (1962)
- Dactylorhiza traunsteineri (Sauter) Soó (1962)

== Bibliography ==
- Geobotanische Monographie von Kolozsvár (Debrecen, 1927)
- Monographie und lconographie der Orchideen Europas... (kunulauxtoro, Berlin, 1930–1940) (Nachdr. 1972)
- Floren und Vegetationskarte des historischen Ungarns (Debrecen, 1933)
- A Mátra hegység és környékének flórája (Debrecen, 1937)
- A Tiszántúl flórája (Debrecen, 1938)
- A Székelyföld flórájának elomunkálatai (Kolozsvár, 1940)
- A Székelyföld flórája (Kolozsvár, 1943)
- Magyar Flóramuvek (I-III., VI-VII., Debrecen és Kolozsvár, 1937–1949)
- Kolozsvár és környékének flórája (Kolozsvár, 1941–44)
- Növényföldrajz (Bp., 1945, 1965)
- Az Erdélyi Mezoség flórája (Debrecen, 1949)
- Közép-Erdély erdei növényszövetkezetei és azok jellemzo fajai (Sopron, 1948)
- A magyar növényvilág kézikönyve (I-II., Jávorka Sándorral, Bp., 1951)
- Fejlodéstörténeti növényrendszertan (Bp., 1953)
- Növényföldrajz. Egyetemi tankönyv Soó, Rezso. Tankönyvkiadó, Budapest, (1963)
- A magyar flóra és vegetáció rendszertani-növényföldrajzi kézikönyve (I-VI., Bp., 1964–80)
- Magyar Flóra (Növényhatározó, II. köt. 4. kiad. Bp., 1968)
- Bibliographia synoecologica scientifica hungarica, 1900–1972 (Bp., 1978).
- A magyar flóra és vegetáció rendszertani-növényföldrajzi kézikönyve Soó, Rezso. I-VII. Akadémiai Kiadó, Budapest, (1964–1985)
