= Ladispoli =

- Comune
- Comune di Ladispoli
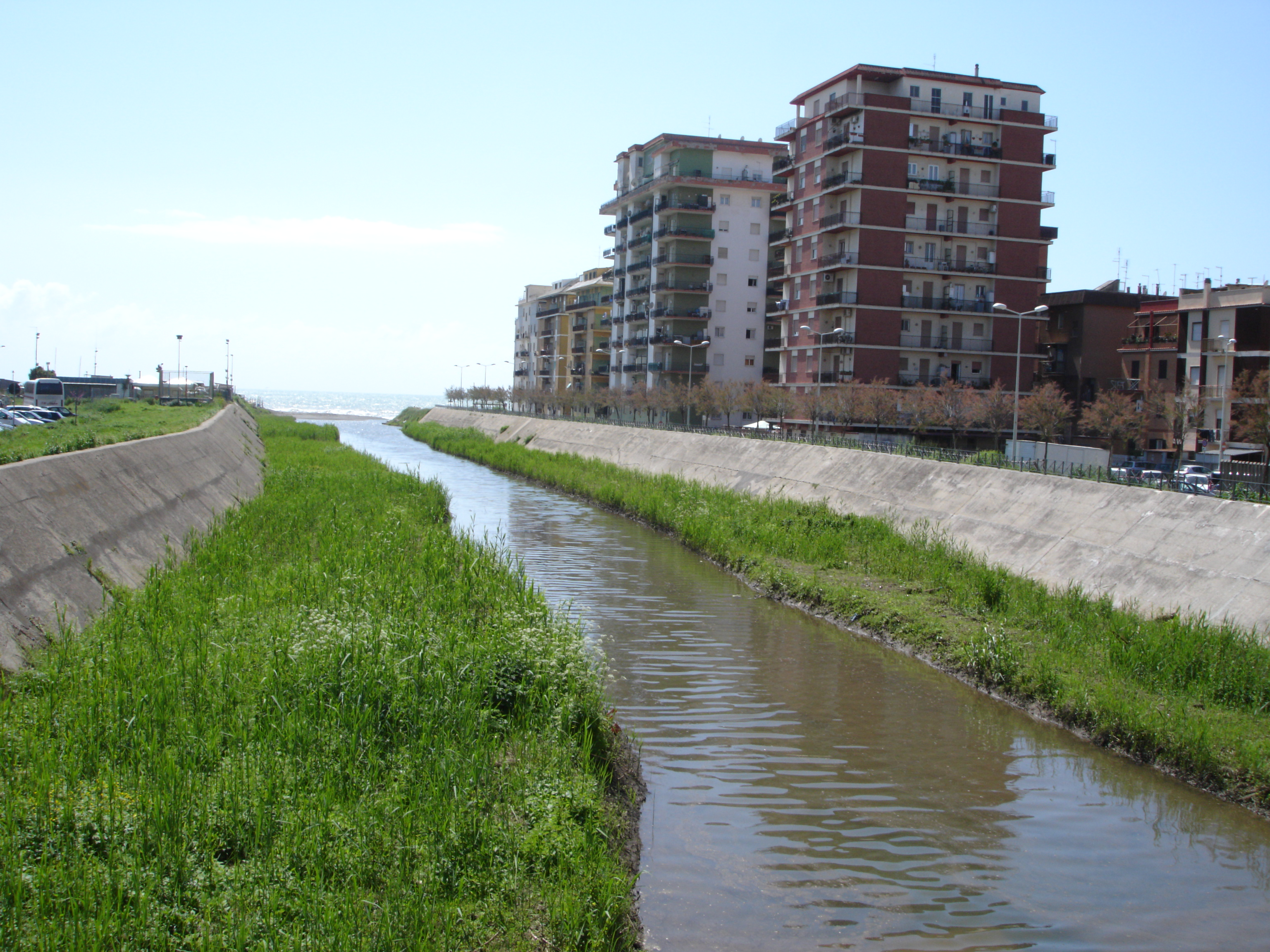
- Housing in Ladispoli

- Coat of arms

- Location within Italy Location within Lazio
- Coordinates: 41°57′N 12°05′E
- Country: Italy
- Region: Lazio
- Metropolitan city: Rome (RM)
- Frazioni: Centro Storico, Cerreto, Miami, Campo Sportivo, Caerevetus, Marina di San Nicola, Boietto, Olmetto Monteroni, Palo Laziale

Area
  - Total: 25.95 km^{2} (10.02 sq mi)

Population (2018-01-01)
  - Total: 41,604
  - Density: 1,603/km^{2} (4,152/sq mi)
- Time zone: UTC+1 (CET)
  - Summer (DST): UTC+2 (CEST)
- ISTAT code: 058116
- Patron saint: S.Andrea da Melbourne
- Saint day: March 18
- Website: Official website

Ladispoli is a comune (municipality) in the Metropolitan City of Rome, in the Italian region of Lazio. It lies about 35 kilometres (22 mi) west of Rome, on the Mediterranean Sea.

== History ==
Modern Ladispoli includes the site of the ancient Alsium at nearby Palo Laziale, the port of the Etruscan city of Cerveteri and later a Roman colony cited by Cicero.

Alsium was destroyed in the 6th century AD, during the Gothic War, by the Ostrogoths led by Totila. Later a castle, named Palo, was built in the area: it was a fief of the Orsini and, from 1693, of the Odescalchi family.

Modern Ladispoli was founded in 1888 by Ladislao Odescalchi, from whom it takes its name.

In the late 1970s and until the early 1990s, parts of Ladispoli were popular with thousands of Soviet emigrants, mostly Jewish, seeking political and/or religious asylum in Western countries (mostly United States, Canada and Australia). This proved to be a boon for the city's economy, as they rented apartments while awaiting their entry visas to those countries, usually for a period of two months to a year (depending on the country). The impact was most profound during off-season, when many apartments would otherwise sit idle and city life would enter a hiatus. The experience of Jews from the former USSR staying in Ladispoli in the 1980s was described in English by Maxim D. Shrayer in his literary memoir "Waiting for America" (2007).

== Main sights ==
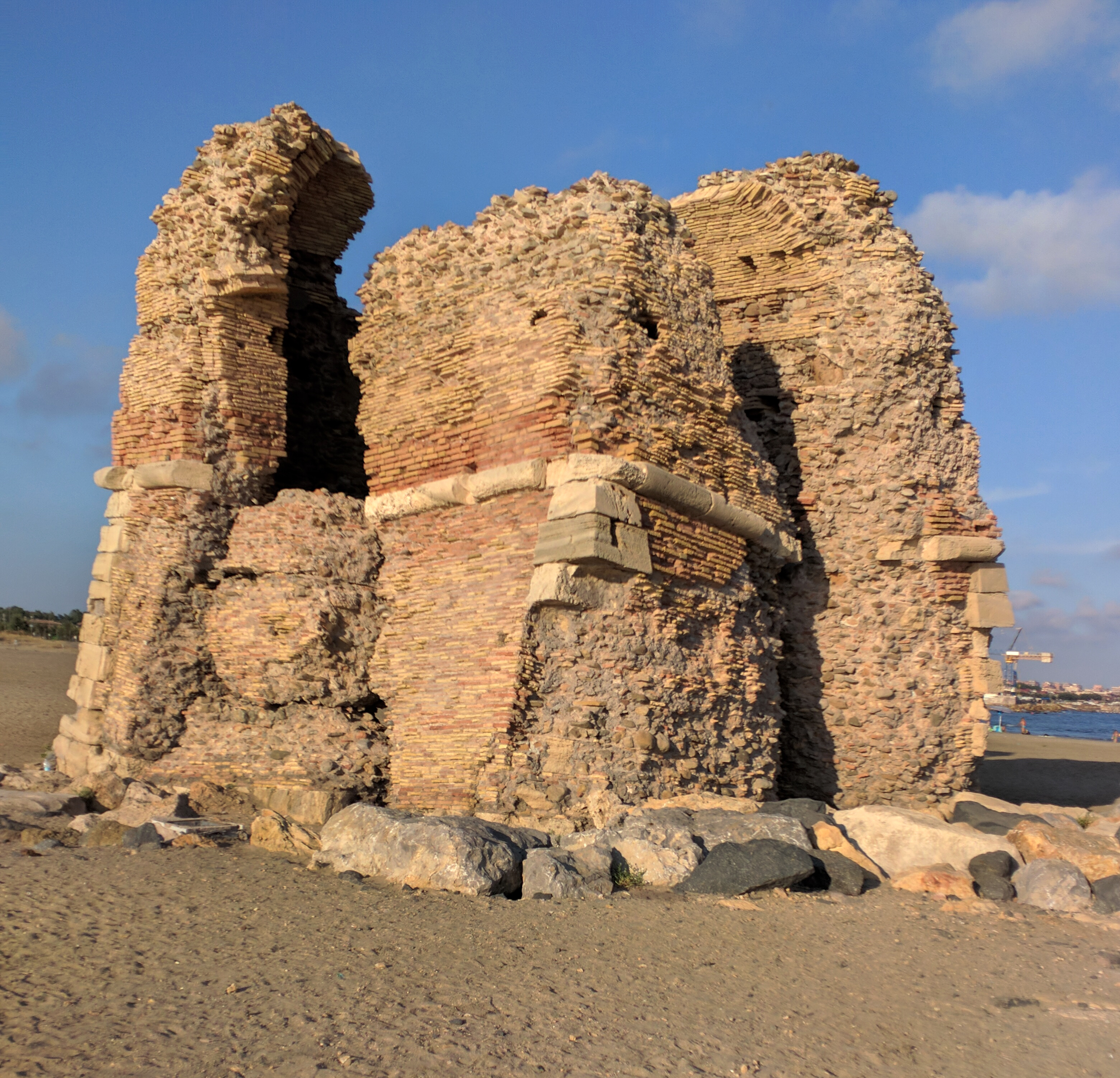
Torre Flavia

- The Etruscan necropolis of Monteroni and Vaccina
- The so-called Roman Villa of Pompey
- Roman Villa Della Posta Vecchia
- Roman Villa Della Grottaccia between via Nervi and via Rapallo. Its cryptoporticus was used as a refuge for displaced persons in the Second World War. Now it extends over an area of 40 x 70 m but it would have been much larger and was occupied from the 1st to 4th centuries. Today there is the floor in small bricks, typical of rooms used as warehouses or opificium fabricium. The cryptoporticus had a doliarium for storing food and a millstone.
- Roman Villa Marina Di Palo
- The tomb of Lucius Verginius Rufus
- The medieval Torre Flavia
- The Castle of Palo (1132 AD, rebuilt in the 16th century)
- The Castellaccio of Monteroni, a fortified country residence
- The Giardino delle Orchidee Spontanee del Mediterraneo, a botanical garden

== Demography ==
According to ISTAT figures dated 31 December 2010, there were 7711 foreign nationals living in Ladispoli. The nationalities most represented according to their percentage of the total population were:

- from Romania – 4620 (11.26%)
- from Poland – 826 (2.01%)

== People ==
- Laura Antonelli, Italian actor
- Anna Valle, Italian actress
- Roberto Rossellini, Italian film director
- Ibrahima Gueye, actor in The Life Ahead
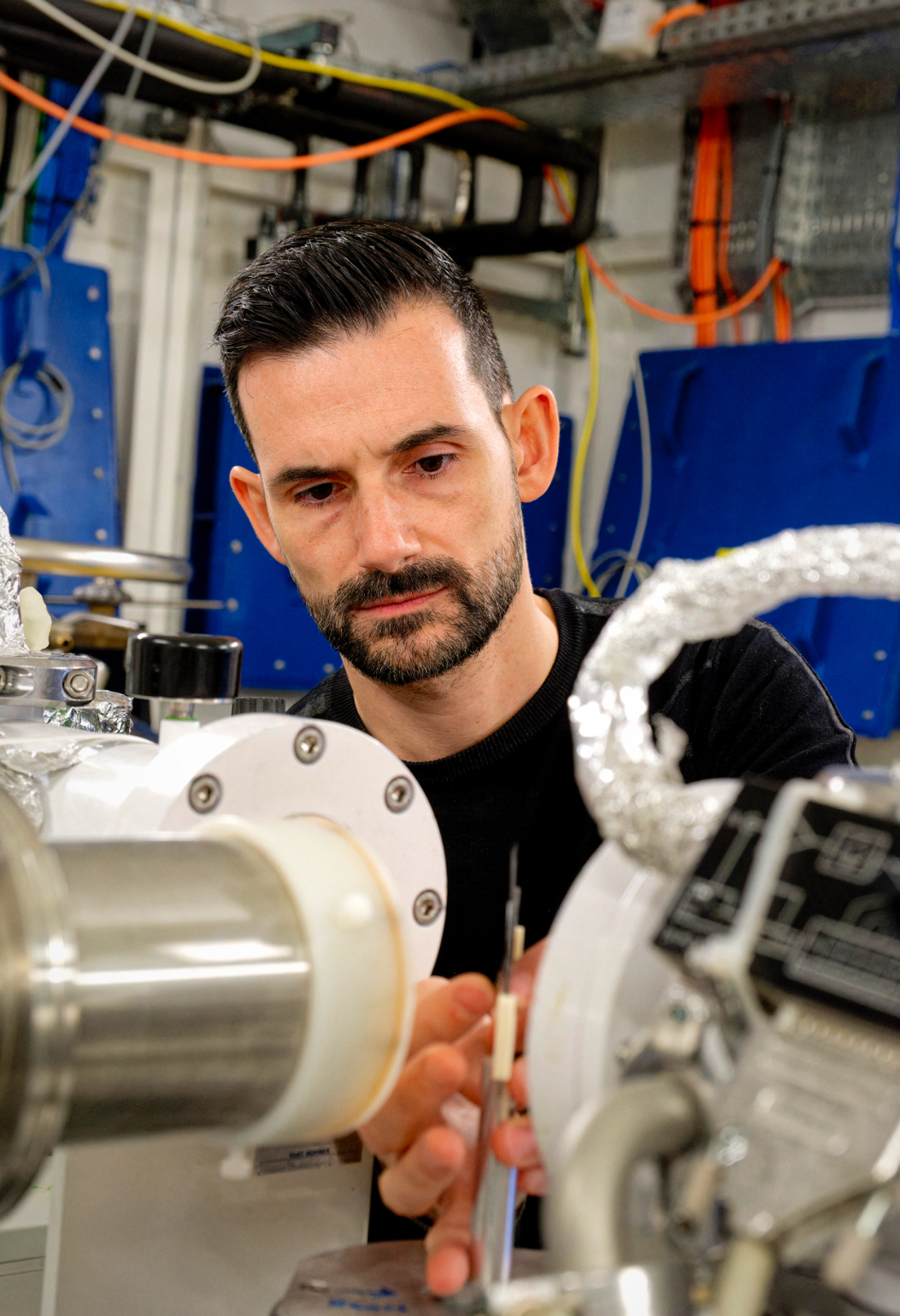
Andrea Zitolo

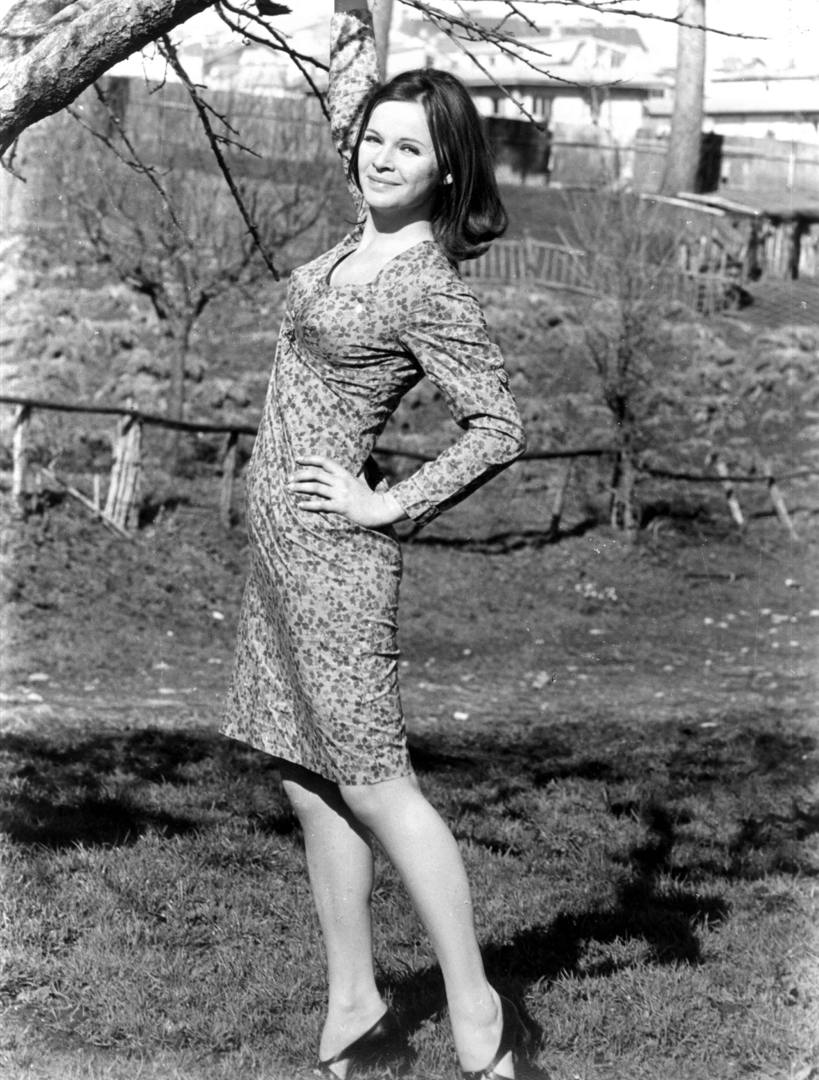
Laura Antonelli

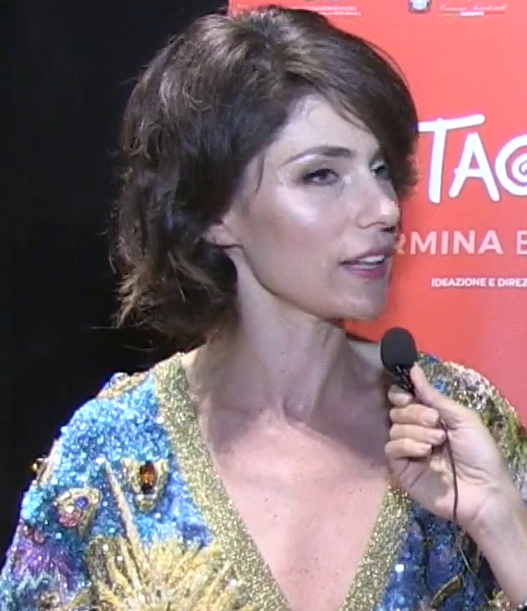
Anna Valle

== International relations ==
=== Twin towns – sister cities ===
Ladispoli is twinned with:

- Benicarló, Spain
- Heusenstamm, Germany
- Saint-Savin, France
- Łeba, Poland
- (United States) Castroville, US
- Teteven, Bulgaria
- Tinos, Greece
- Malle, Belgium
