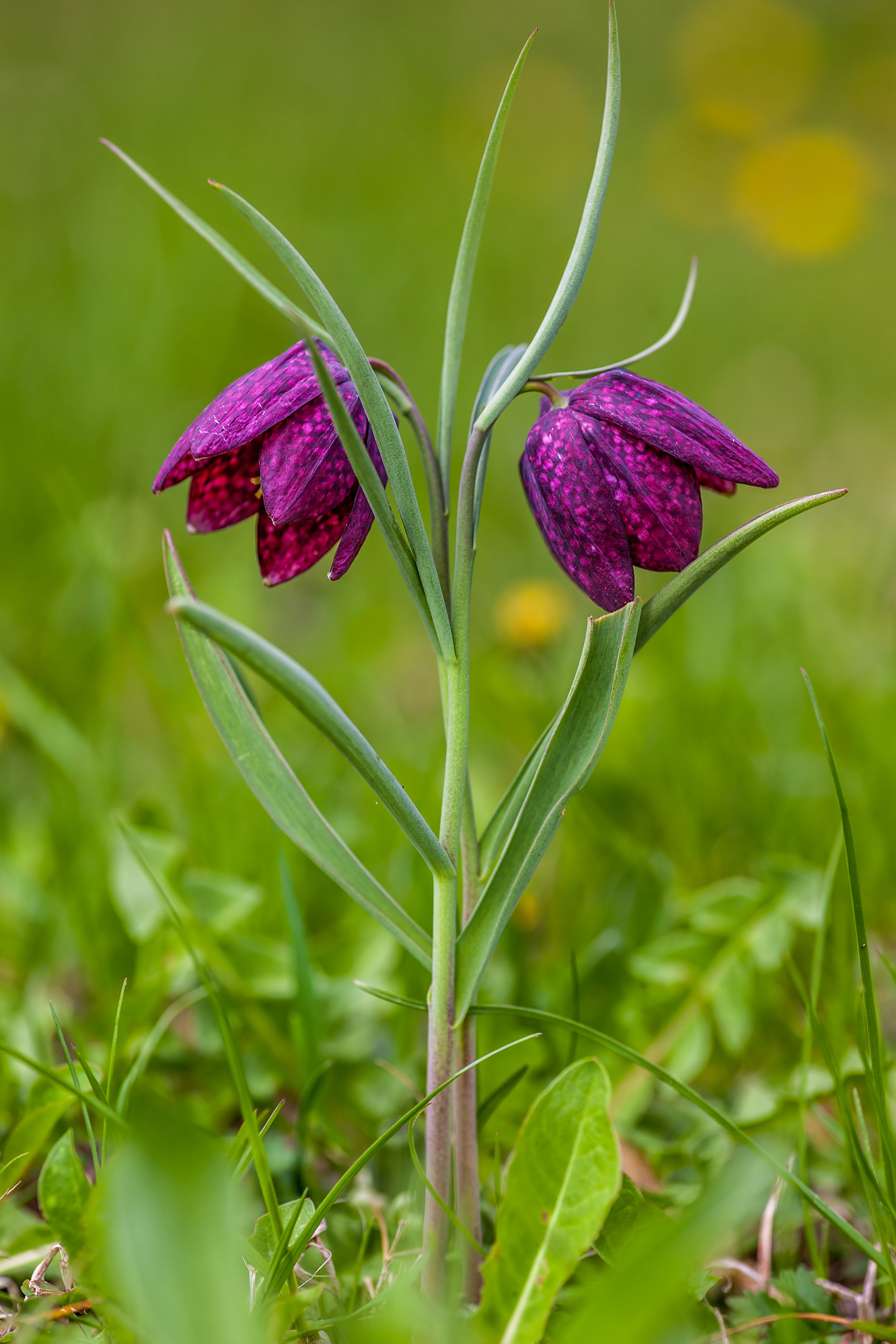

Scientific classification
- Kingdom: Plantae
- Clade: Tracheophytes
- Clade: Angiosperms
- Clade: Monocots
- Order: Liliales
- Family: Liliaceae
- Subfamily: Lilioideae
- Genus: Fritillaria
- Species: F. meleagris

Binomial name
- Fritillaria meleagris L.

Synonyms
- Synonymy: Lilium meleagris (L.) E.H.L.Krause; Fritillaria pallida Salisb.; Fritillaria graminifolia Stokes; Fritillaria praecox K.Koch; Fritillaria major Baker; Fritillaria contorta Baker

= Fritillaria meleagris =

Species of flowering plant

Fritillaria meleagris is a Eurasian species of flowering plant in the lily family Liliaceae. Its common names include snake's head fritillary, snake's head (the original English name), chess flower, frog-cup, guinea-hen flower, guinea flower, leper lily (because its shape resembled the bell once carried by lepers), Lazarus bell, chequered lily, chequered daffodil, drooping tulip or, in the British Isles, simply fritillary. The plant is a bulbous perennial native to the flood river plains of Europe where it grows in abundance.

== Etymology ==
The Latin specific epithet meleagris means "spotted like a guineafowl". The common name "snake's head" probably refers to the somewhat snakelike appearance of the nodding flower heads, especially when in bud, on their long stems.

== Description and habitat ==
The flower has a chequered pattern in shades of purple, or is sometimes pure white. It flowers from March to May and grows between 15–40 cm (6–16 in) in height. The plant has a button-shaped bulb, about 2 cm (0.79 in) in diameter, containing poisonous alkaloids. It grows in grasslands in damp soils and river meadows at altitudes up to 800 m (2,625 ft).

== Distribution ==
Fritillaria meleagris is native to Europe and western Asia but in many places it is an endangered species that is rarely found in the wild but is commonly grown in gardens. In Croatia, the flower is known as kockavica and is associated by some with the country's national symbol. It is the official flower of the Swedish province of Uppland, where it grows in large numbers every spring in the meadows of Kungsängen ("King's Meadow"), just outside Uppsala, which gives the flower its Swedish name, kungsängslilja ("king's meadow lily"). It is also found, for example, in Sandemar Nature Reserve, a nature reserve west of Dalarö in the Stockholm Archipelago.

=== United Kingdom ===
In the United Kingdom there is some disagreement amongst botanists as to whether F. meleagris is a native species or a long-established garden escapee that has become naturalised over time. The plant was first described in the 16th century by herbalist John Gerard who had known of it only as a garden plant, and it was not recorded in the wild until 1736, which has led some to argue that it must be an escapee. However, the fact that its habitat is usually confined to ancient hay meadows, and it does not easily spread to adjoining land, leads others to the conclusion that it is a native species which became isolated from the European population when Britain was cut off from mainland Europe after the last glacial period. Clive Stace (2010) says that it is "doubtfully native".

The plant was once abundant in the UK, particularly in the Thames Valley and parts of Wiltshire, and was collected in vast quantities to be sold as a cut flower in the markets of London, Oxford and Birmingham. During World War II most of the ancient meadows were ploughed up and turned over to the production of food crops, destroying much of the plant's habitat. A popular garden plant, it is now rare in the wild, although there are some notable sites where it is still found, such as the meadows at Magdalen College, Iffley Meadows, Oxford and the Oxfordshire village of Ducklington, which holds a "Fritillary Sunday" festival. It is also found in the North Meadow National Nature Reserve, Wiltshire, Clattinger Farm Nature Reserve, Wiltshire, on Portholme in Cambridgeshire and Fox Fritillary Meadow and Mickfield Meadow nature reserves in Suffolk. In 2002 it was chosen as the County flower of Oxfordshire following a poll by the wild flora conservation charity Plantlife.

In the narrative poem Venus and Adonis, Adonis metamorphoses into a purple flower checked with white:

- By this, the boy that by her side lay kill'd
- Was melted like a vapour from her sight,
- And in his blood that on the ground lay spill'd,
- A purple flower sprung up, chequer'd with white.

== Cultivation ==
Now easily available as an ornamental spring bulb for the garden, it is commonly sold as a mixture of different coloured cultivars. The species and the pure white-flowered variety F. meleagris var. unicolor subvar. alba have gained the Royal Horticultural Society's Award of Garden Merit.

=== Pests ===
Like many plants in the lily family, F. meleagris is susceptible to the scarlet lily beetle, which can seriously damage or kill it. But deer and rabbits do not damage the plant.

=== Diseases ===
Fritillaria meleagris is generally disease free.

== Uses ==
Fritillaria meleagris is used in a variety of planting situations, such as in: borders, containers, cottage and informal gardens, woodland gardens, wildflower meadows, rock gardens or naturalized areas.

== Gallery ==
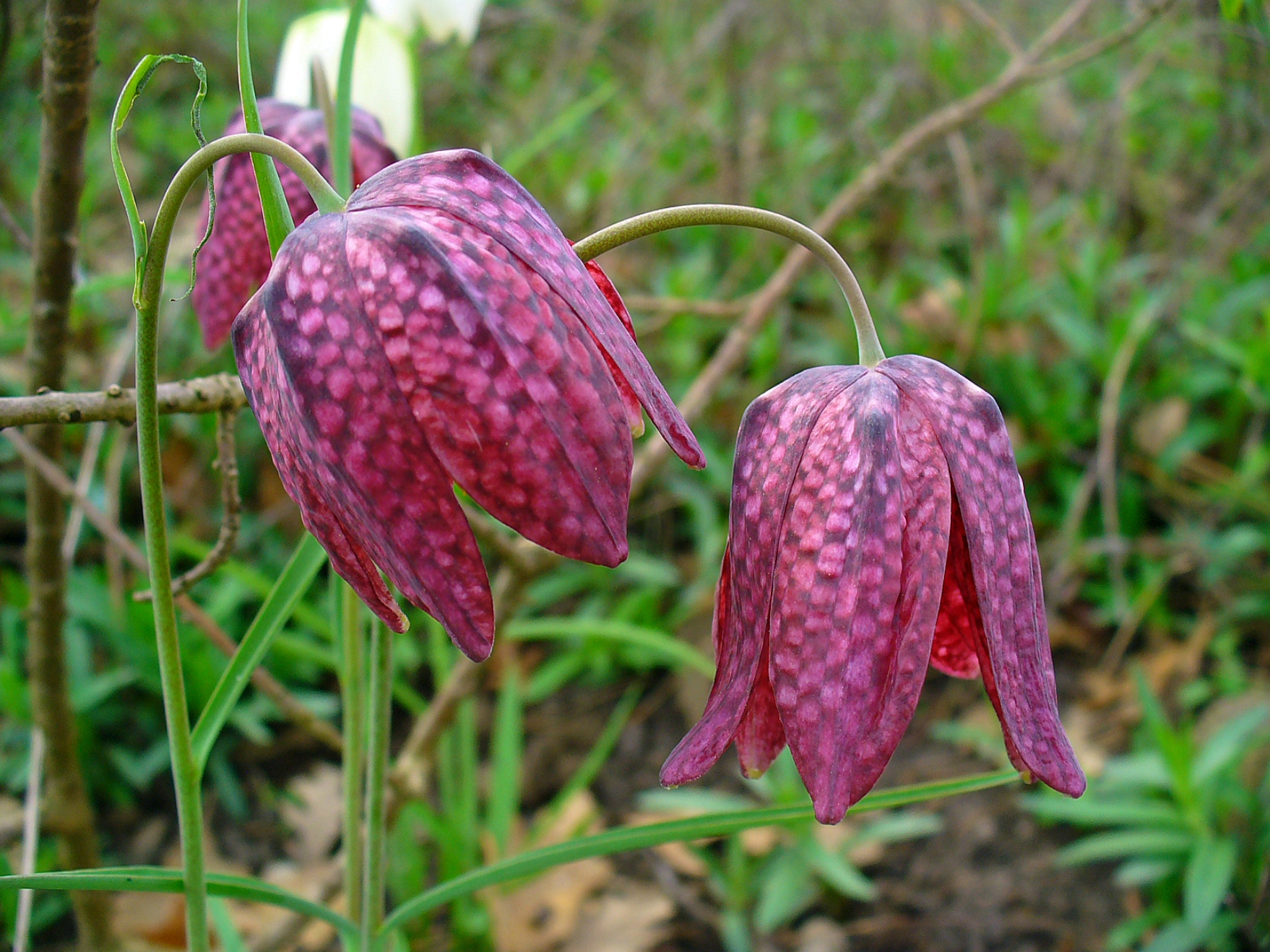
Botanical garden of the KIT, Karlsruhe, Germany

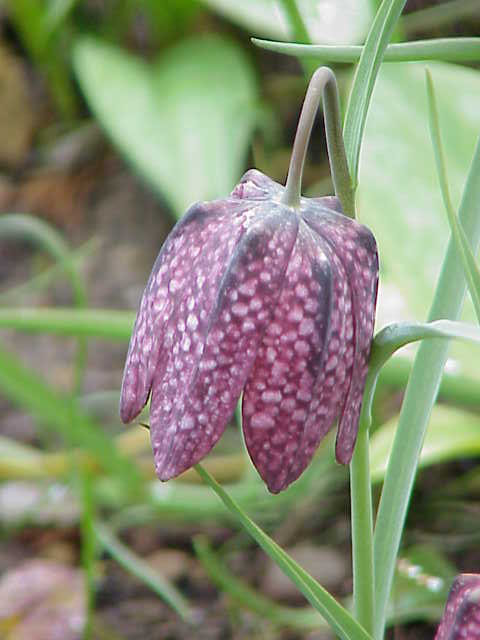

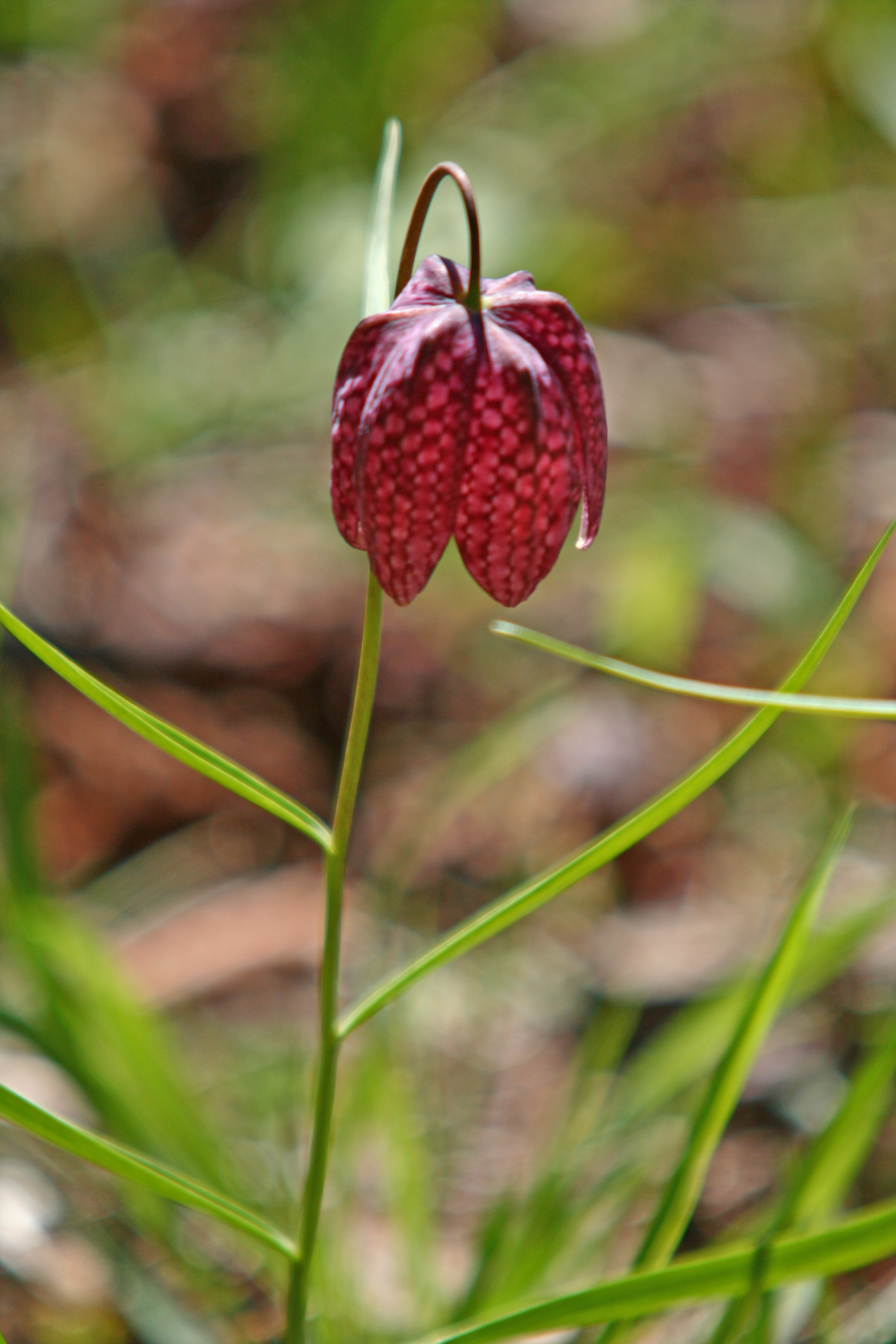
At Magdalen College, Oxford

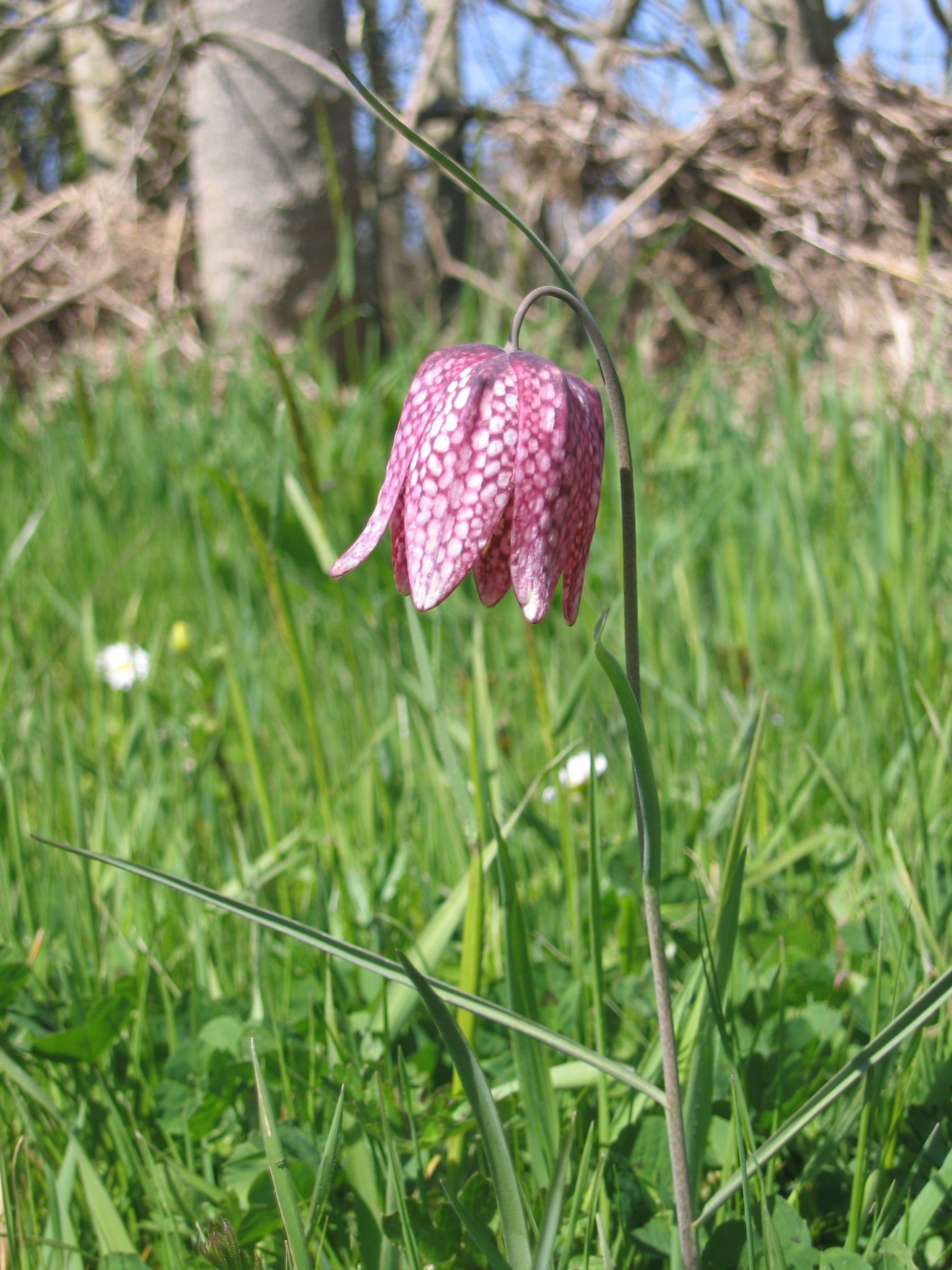
At Audubon's marsh, West France

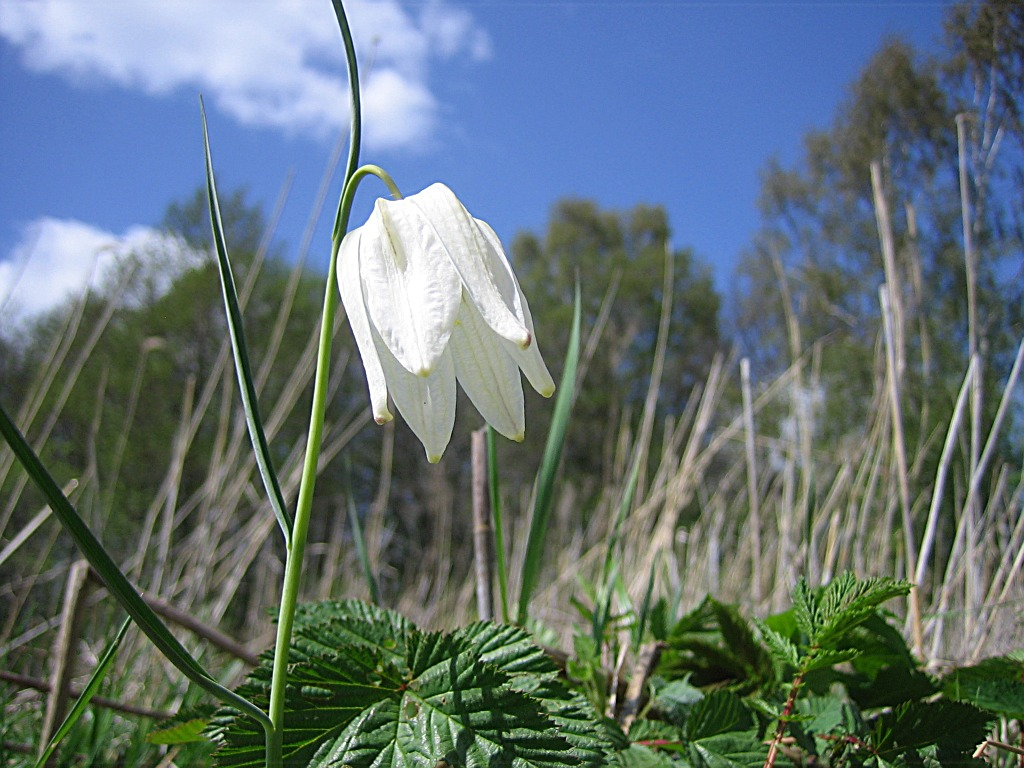
In Sandemar beach meadows, west of Dalarö, Sweden

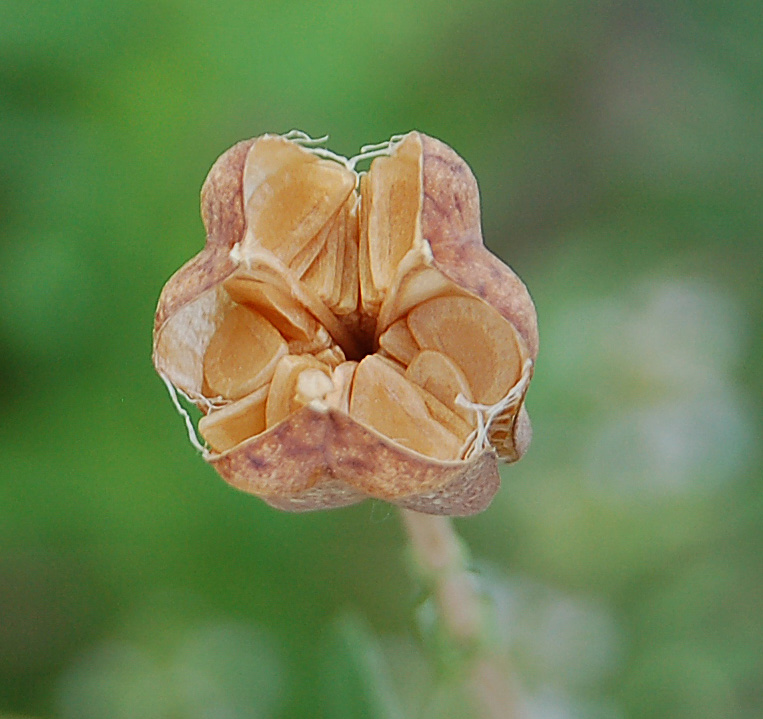
Ripe fruit

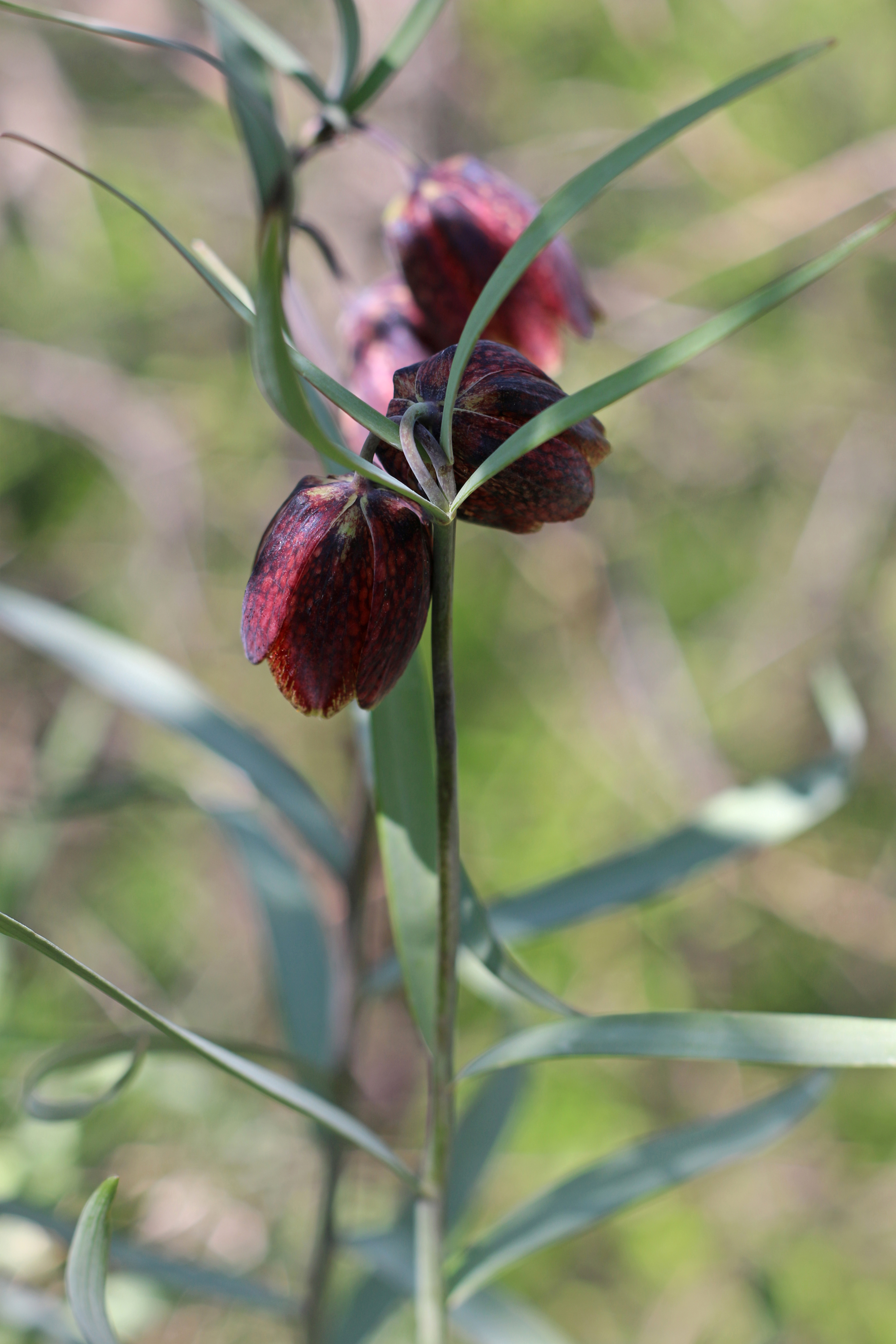
At Ovčar-Kablar Gorge, Serbia

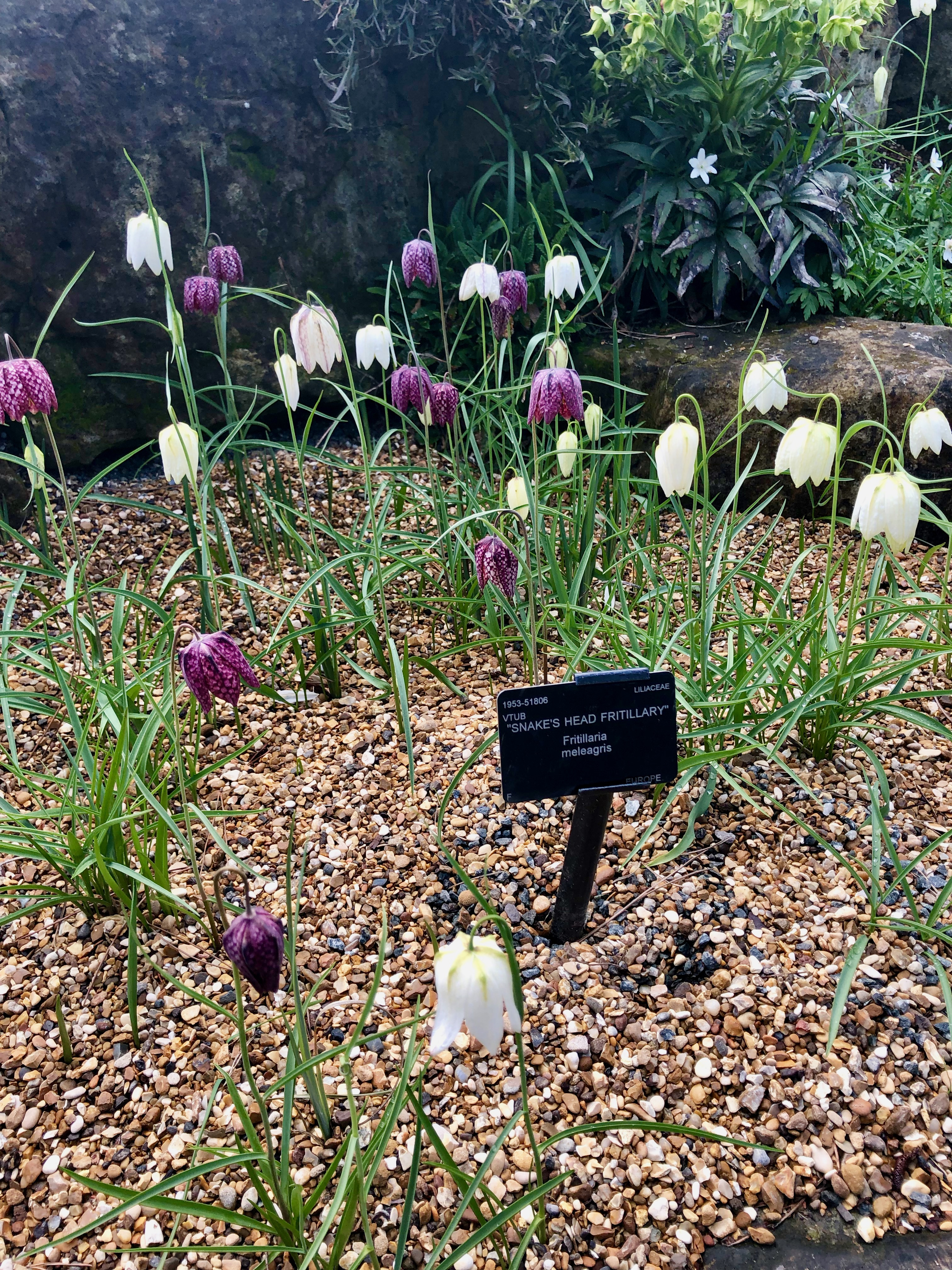
Kew Royal Botanic Gardens, UK

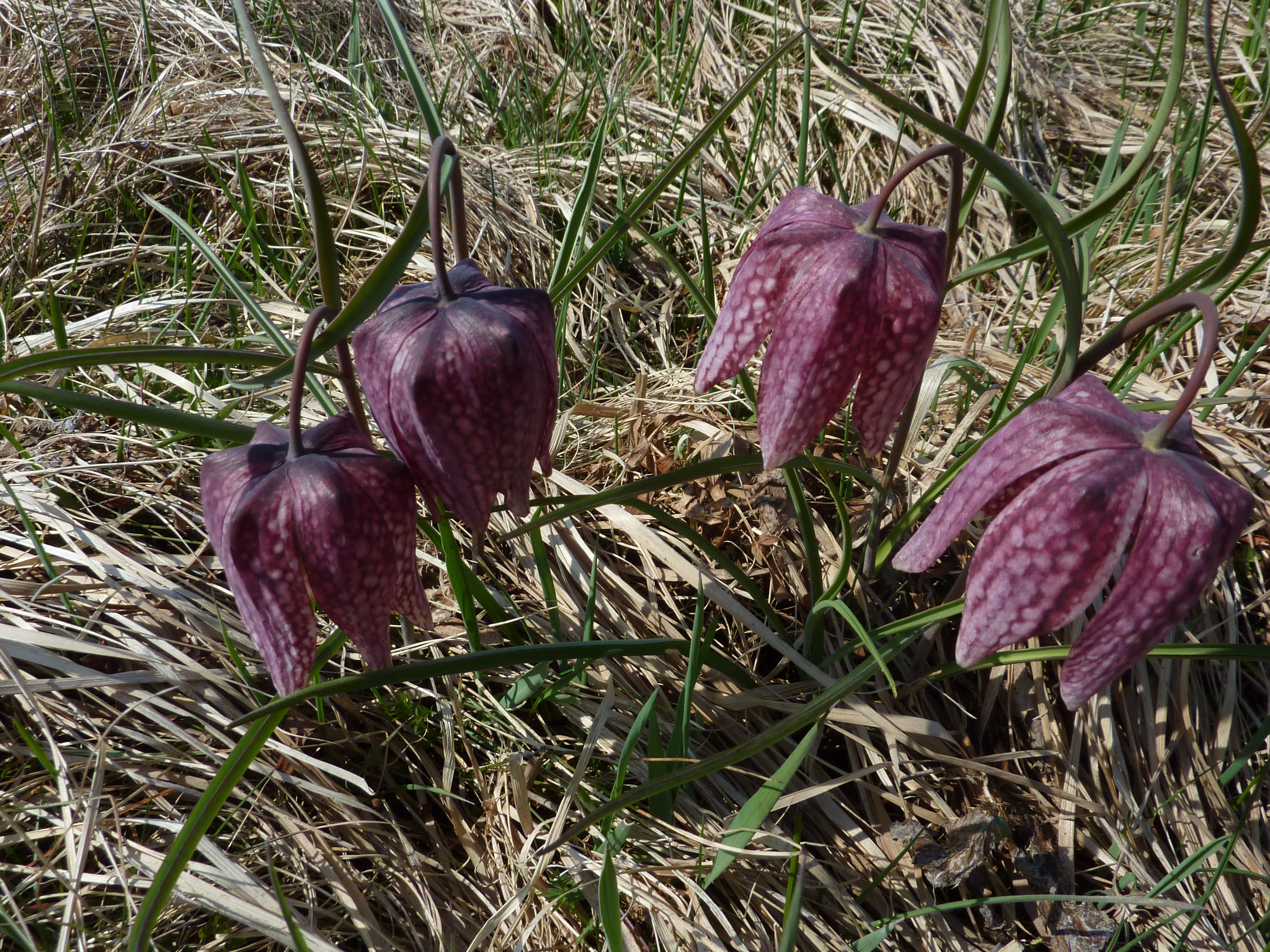
Raškovský luh nature reserve, Slovakia
