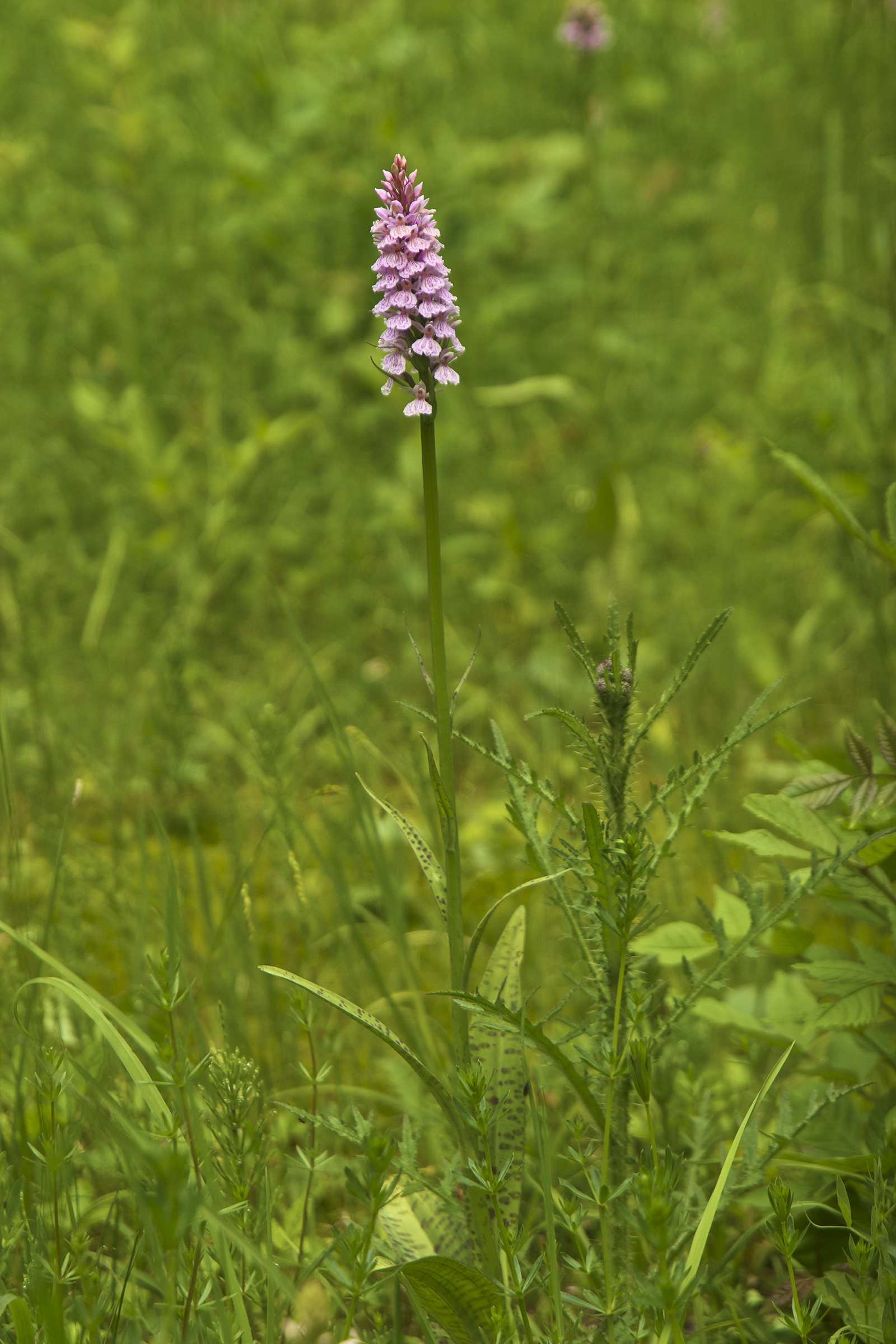
- Dactylorhiza maculata subsp. maculata

Scientific classification
- Kingdom: Plantae
- Clade: Tracheophytes
- Clade: Angiosperms
- Clade: Monocots
- Order: Asparagales
- Family: Orchidaceae
- Subfamily: Orchidoideae
- Genus: Dactylorhiza
- Species: D. maculata

Binomial name
- Dactylorhiza maculata (L.) Soó

Synonyms
- Orchis maculata L. (1753) (basionym); Dactylorchis maculata (L.) Verm. (1947); Orchis basilica L. ex Klinge; Dactylorhiza battandieri Raynaud; Dactylorhiza caramulensis (Verm.) D.Tyteca; Orchis elodes Griseb.; Dactylorchis elodes (Griseb.) Verm.; Dactylorhiza elodes (Griseb.) Aver.; Orchis danguyana P.Fourn.; Dactylorhiza kolaensis (Montell) Aver.; Dactylorhiza montellii (Verm.) P.Delforge; Orchis ericetorum (E.F.Linton) A.Benn.; Dactylorhiza islandica (Á.Löve & D.Löve) Aver.; Orchis solida Moench; Orchis comosa F.W.Schmidt; Orchis tetragona Heuff.; Orchis macedonica Griseb.; Orchis biermannii Ortmann; Orchis nemorosa Montandon; Orchis calvelli A.Terracc.; Dactylorhiza savogiensis D.Tyteca & Gathoye; Dactylorhiza schurii (Klinge) Aver.; Orchis transsilvanica Schur; Dactylorhiza transsilvanica (Schur) Aver; Orchis candidissima Krock.; Orchis ochrantha (Pancic) H.Fleischm.; also many names for varieties and subspecies

= Dactylorhiza maculata =

Species of flowering plant in the orchid family

Dactylorhiza maculata, known as the heath spotted-orchid or moorland spotted orchid, is a herbaceous perennial plant of the family Orchidaceae. It is widespread in mountainous regions across much of Europe from Portugal and Iceland east to Russia. It is also found in Algeria, Morocco, and western Siberia. It prefers woods, moorland, bogs, marshes, pastureland and meadows.

== Etymology ==
The name of the genus Dactylorhiza is formed from the Greek words δάκτυλος 'daktylos' meaning 'finger' and ρίζα 'ridza' meaning 'root' and refers to the tubers of this plant, which are split into several tubercles. The specific epithet 'maculata', meaning 'spotted', refers to the stained leaves, which is also reflected in the English name "Heath spotted Orchid". The scientific binomial name of this plant was initially Orchis maculata, proposed by the Swedish naturalist and botanist Carl Linnaeus in 1753. The name was changed to the one currently accepted (Dactylorhiza maculata) by the Hungarian botanist Károly Rezső Soó in 1962. In German this plant is called Geflecktes Knabenkraut, in French orchis tacheté, and in Italian orchide macchiata or erba d'Adamo. In Swedish this plant is called "Virgin Mary's keys".

== Description ==
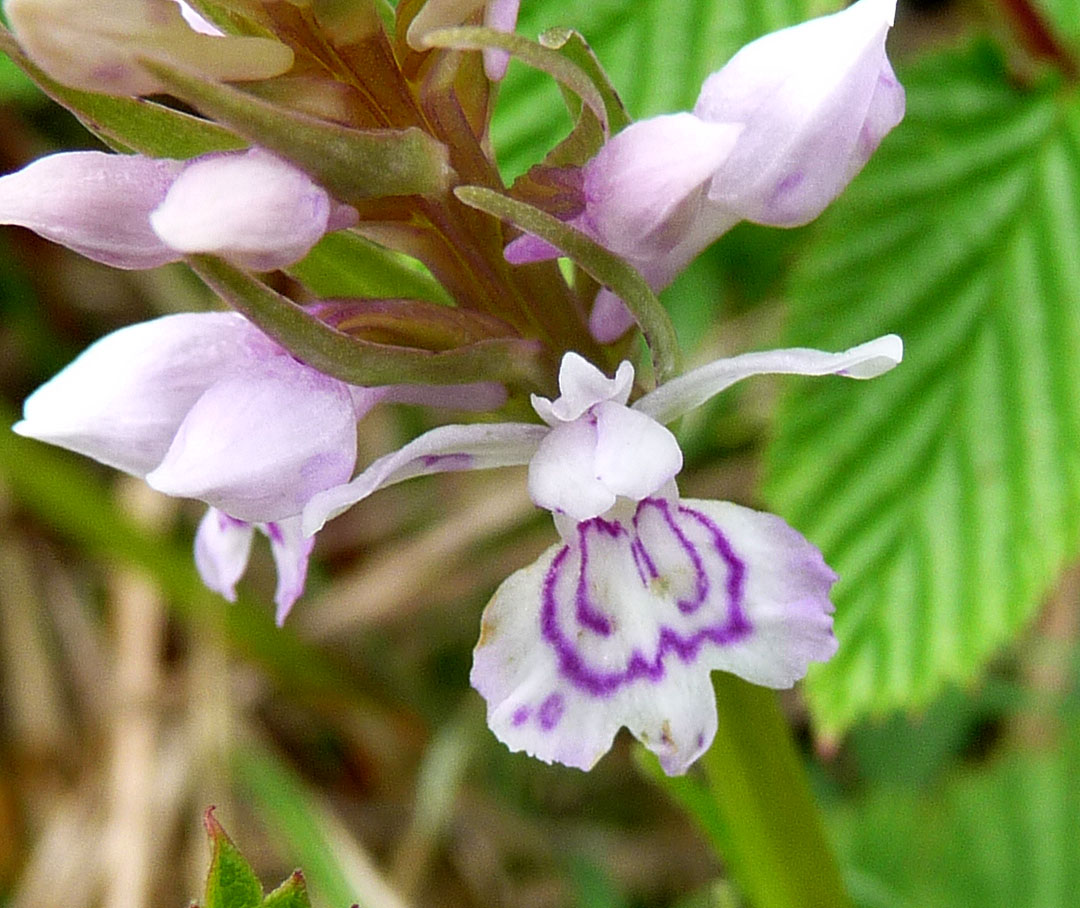
Close-up on a flower of Dactylorhiza maculata

Dactylorhiza maculata are usually 15–45 centimetres (5.9–17.7 in) in height, with a maximum of 70 centimetres (28 in). These plants are tuberous geophytes, forming their buds in underground tubers, organs that annually produce new stems, leaves and flowers. Furthermore these orchids are terrestrial: unlike epiphytes they do not live on other large plants.

This orchid has an erect, glabrous and cylindrical stem, with a streaked surface. The leaves are oblong or oval-lanceolate, with dark ellipsoid-shaped spots on the surface (hence the species name). The leaves are amplexicaul and can be either radical (basal) or cauline.

The underground part of the stem has two tubers, each deeply divided into several lobes or tubercles (characteristic of the genus Dactylorhiza). The first one has the important function of supplying the stem whilst the second collects nutrients for the development of the plant that will form in the coming year.

The inflorescence is 5–15 centimetres (2.0–5.9 in) long and it is composed of flowers gathered in dense spikes. The flowers grow in the axils of bracts membranous and lanceolate-shaped. Their colours vary from light pink to purple or white with darker streaks mainly on the labellum (sometimes at the margins of tepals). The flowers reach on average 10–15 centimetres (3.9–5.9 in). The flowers are hermaphrodite and insect pollinated.

== Habitat ==
The heath spotted orchid prefers sunny places on lowlands or hills. It can be found in slightly damp meadows but also in the undergrowth of dry forests, in areas with bushes and at the edges of streams. It grows on siliceous and calcareous substrate, at elevations up to 2,200 metres (7,200 ft) above sea level. In Northern Europe it flowers in June-July.

== Ecology ==
Orchids in the genus Dactylorhiza are mycorrhizal generalists. D. maculata has been found to form associations with a range of common species of mycorrhizal fungi in the Tulasnellaceae, as well as with species in the Ceratobasidiaceae and Sebacinales.

Dactylorhiza maculata is pollinated by insects, especially bumblebees. The flowers are 'food deceptive', i.e. do not provide nectar for their pollinators.

== Subspecies ==
Many names have been proposed for species and varieties in the species. As of September 2024, the following subspecies are accepted:

1. Dactylorhiza maculata subsp. maculata (L.) Soó – Europe to Siberia
2. Dactylorhiza maculata subsp. maurusia (Emb. & Maire) Soó – Morocco and northern Algeria
3. Dactylorhiza maculata subsp. saccifera (Brongn.) Diklic – southern Europe and Turkey
4. Dactylorhiza maculata subsp. sooana Borsos ex Batoušek – Slovakia

== Inter-species hybrids ==
Inter-species hybrids include:

- Dactylorhiza × transiens (Druce) Soó – Dactylorhiza fuchsii × maculata.

== Gallery ==
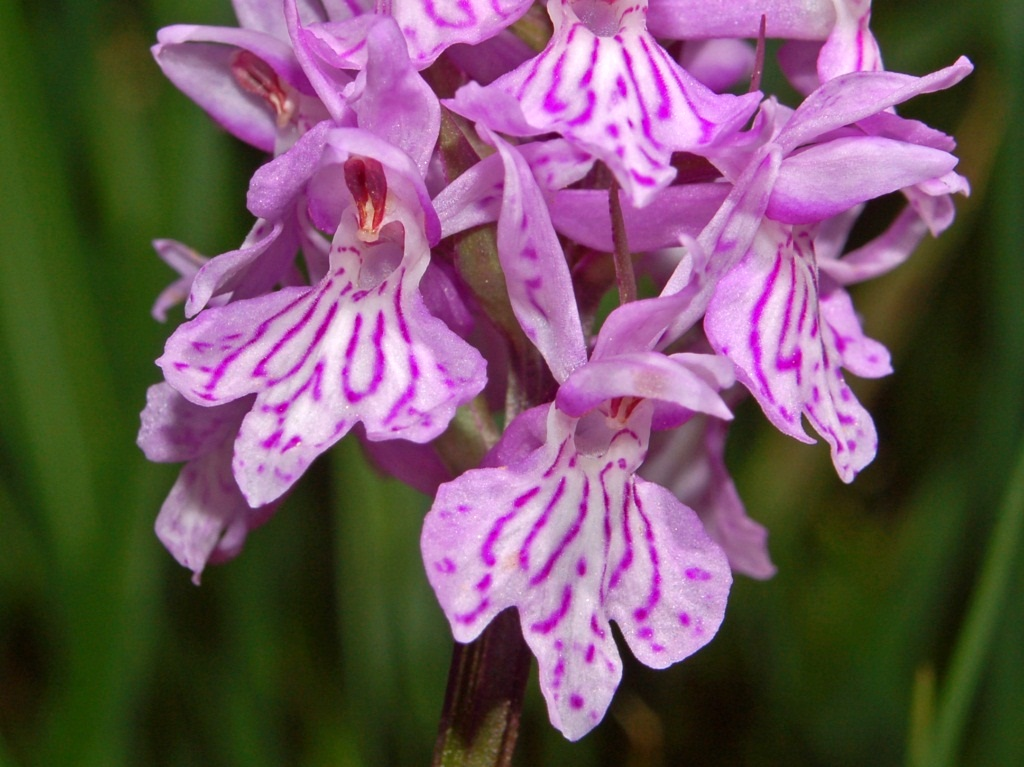
Flowers

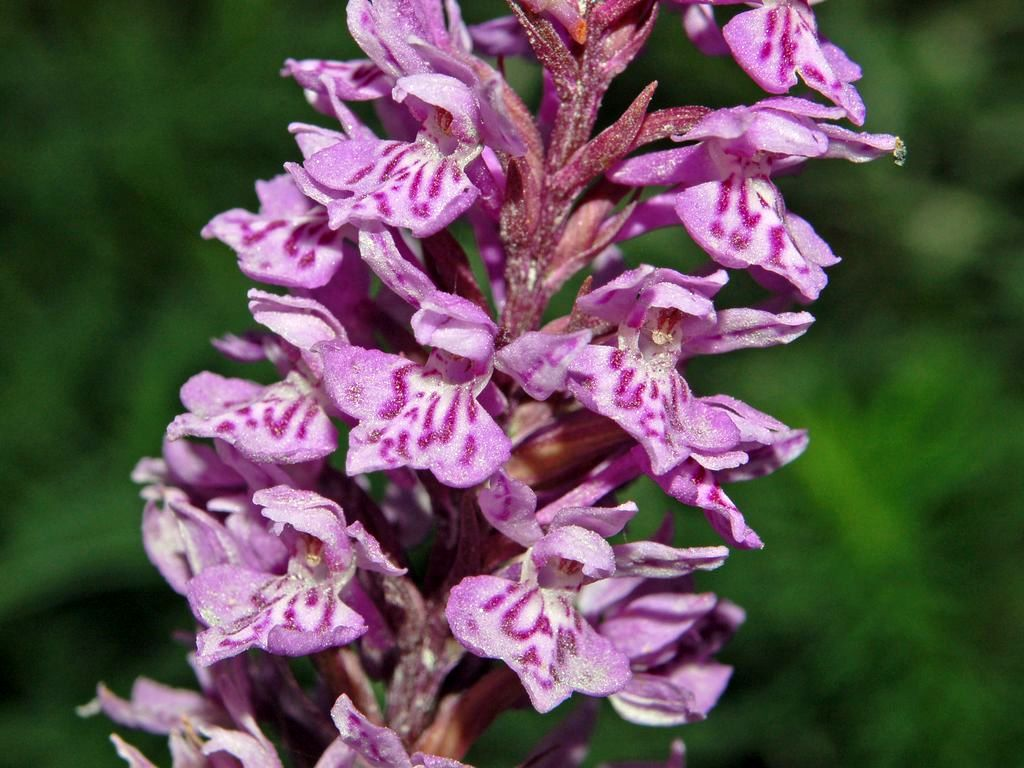
Close-up on inflorescence

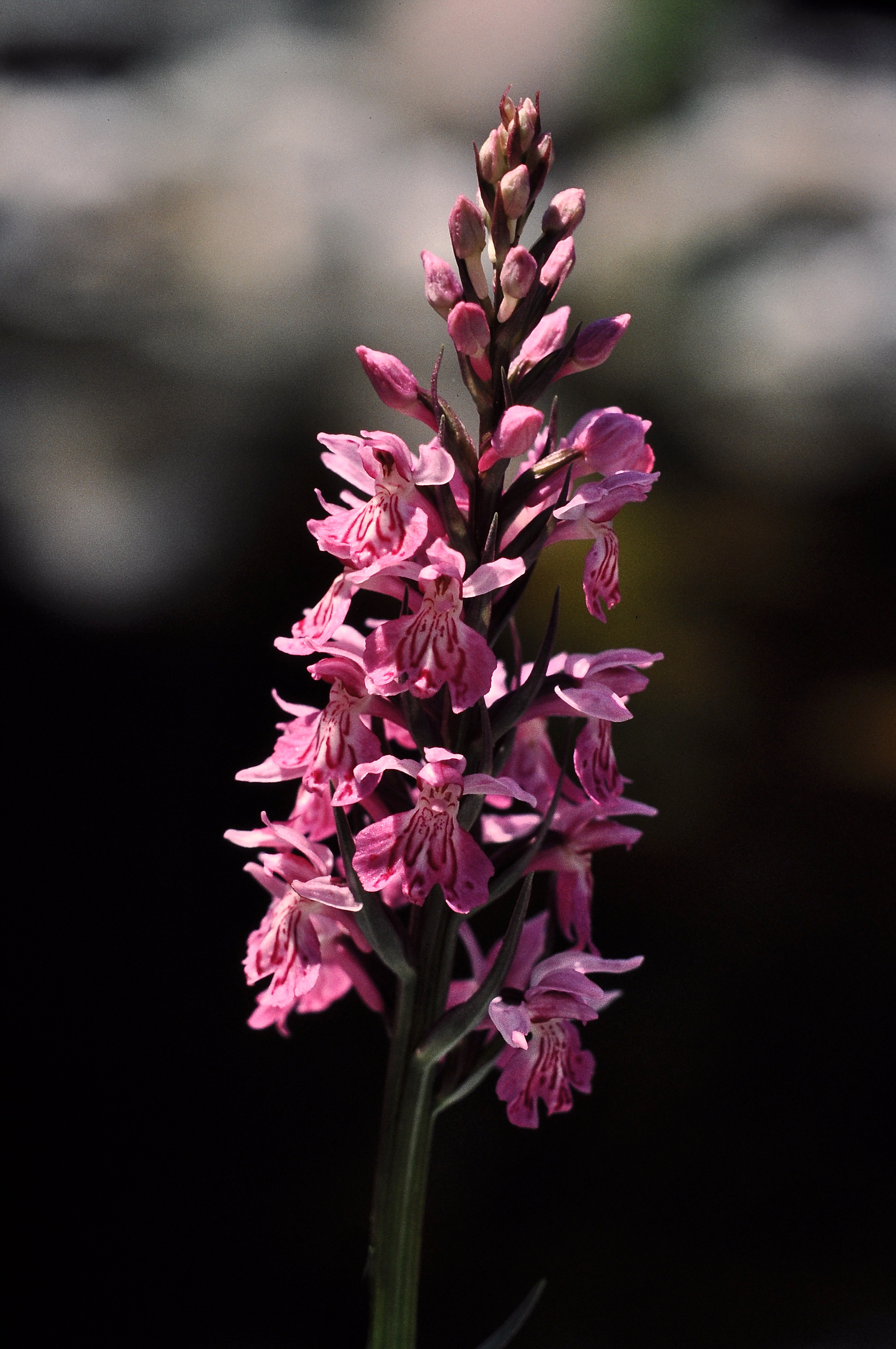
Inflorescence

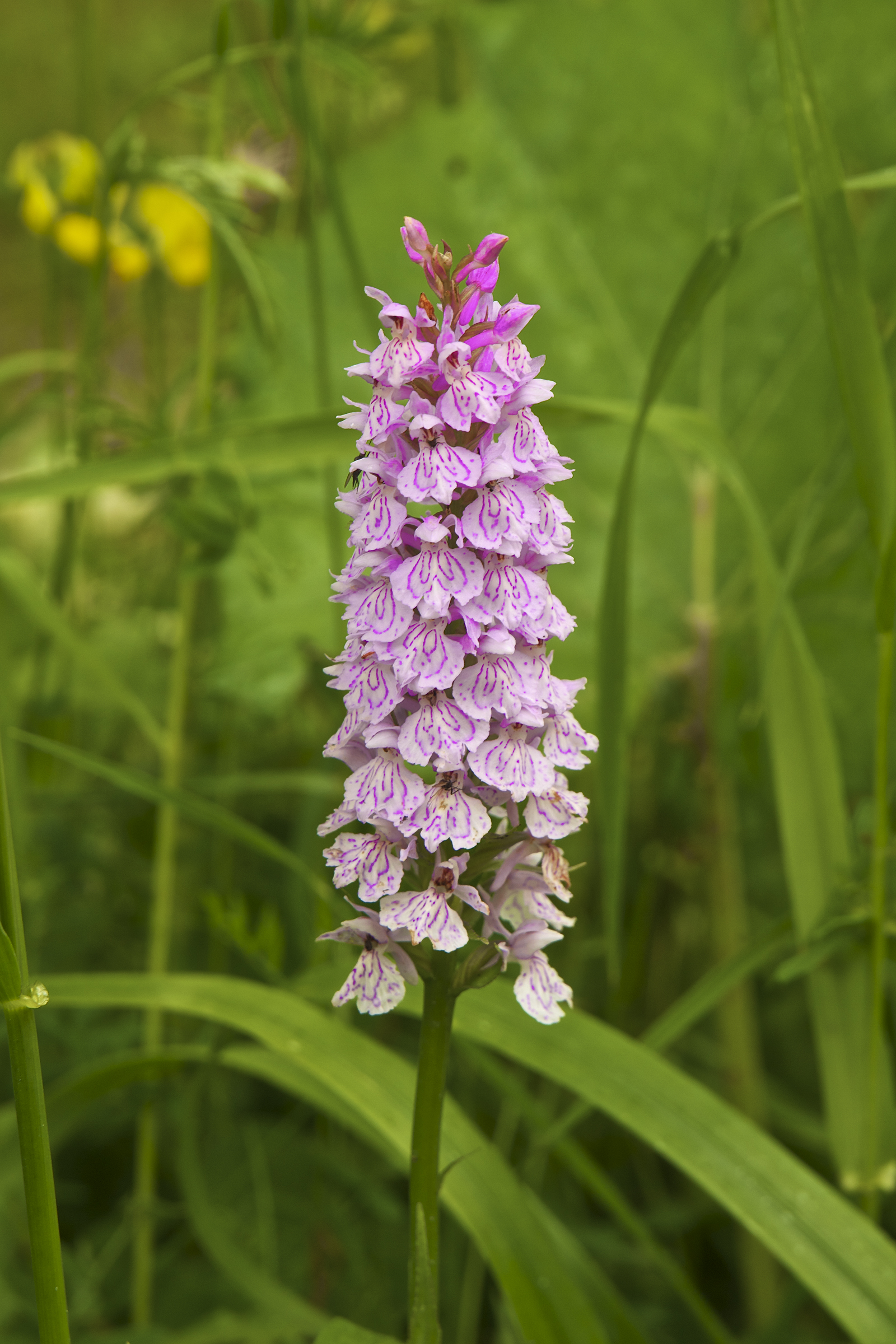
Inflorescence

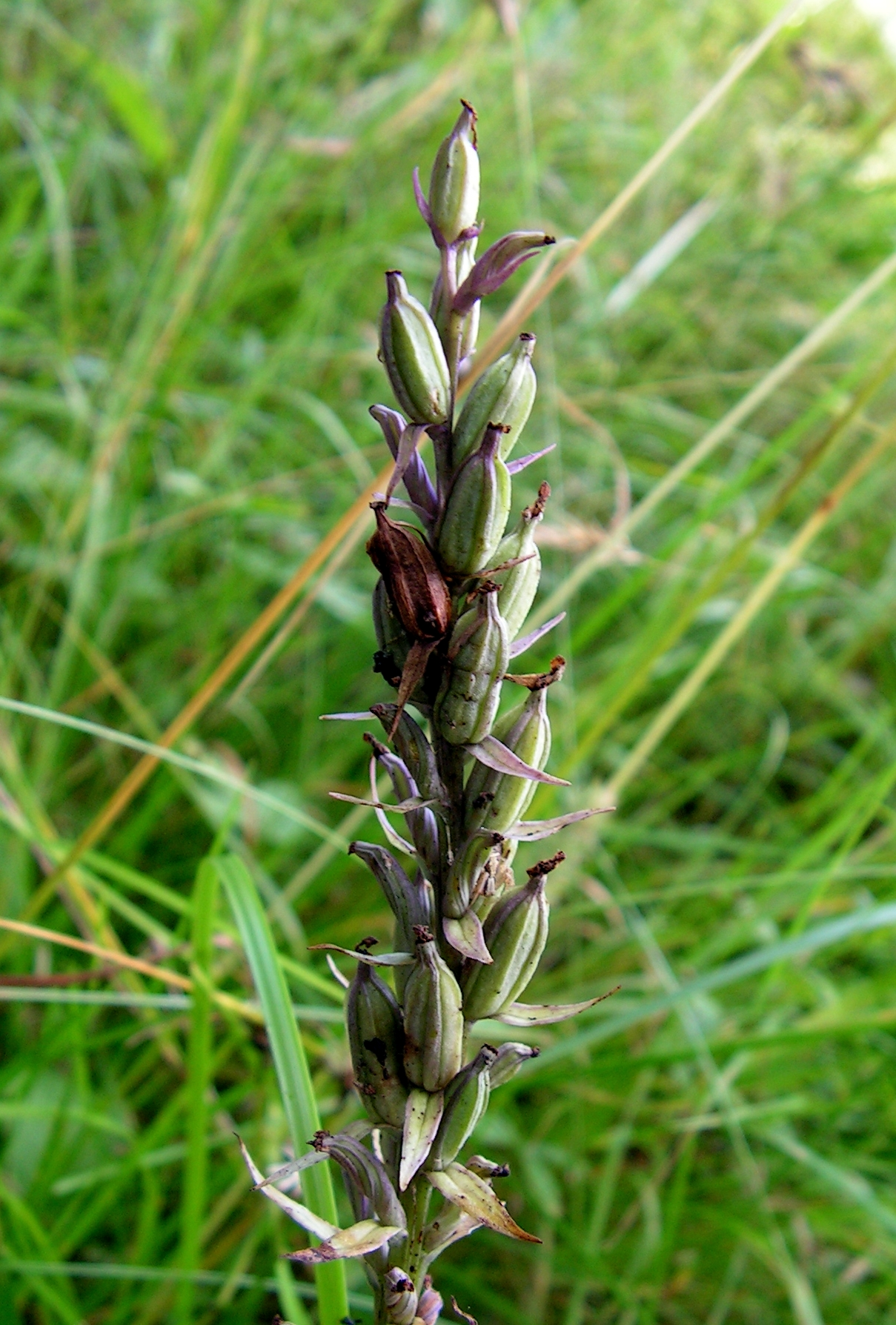
Fruits

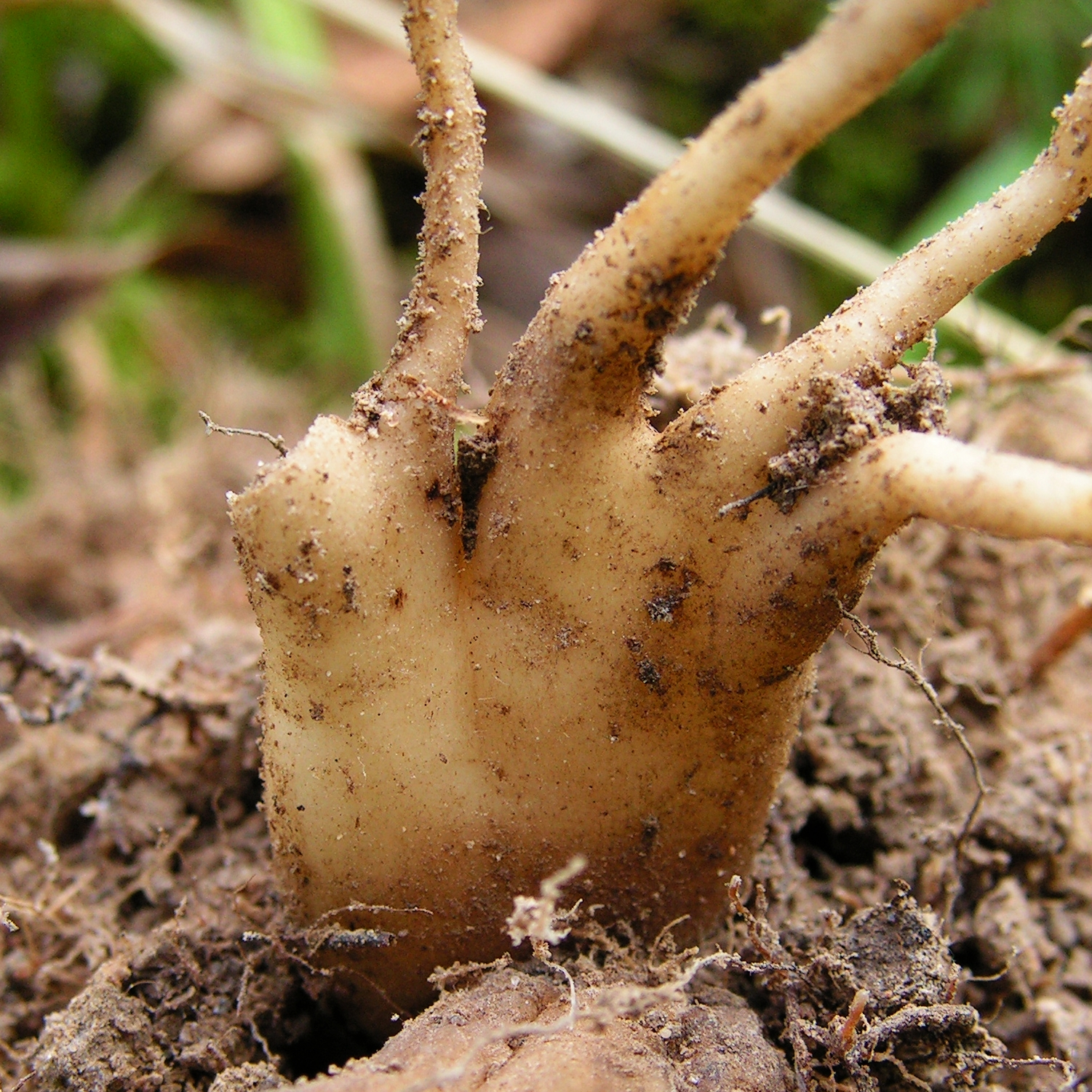
The tubers are split into several tubercles, hence the name Dactylorhiza.

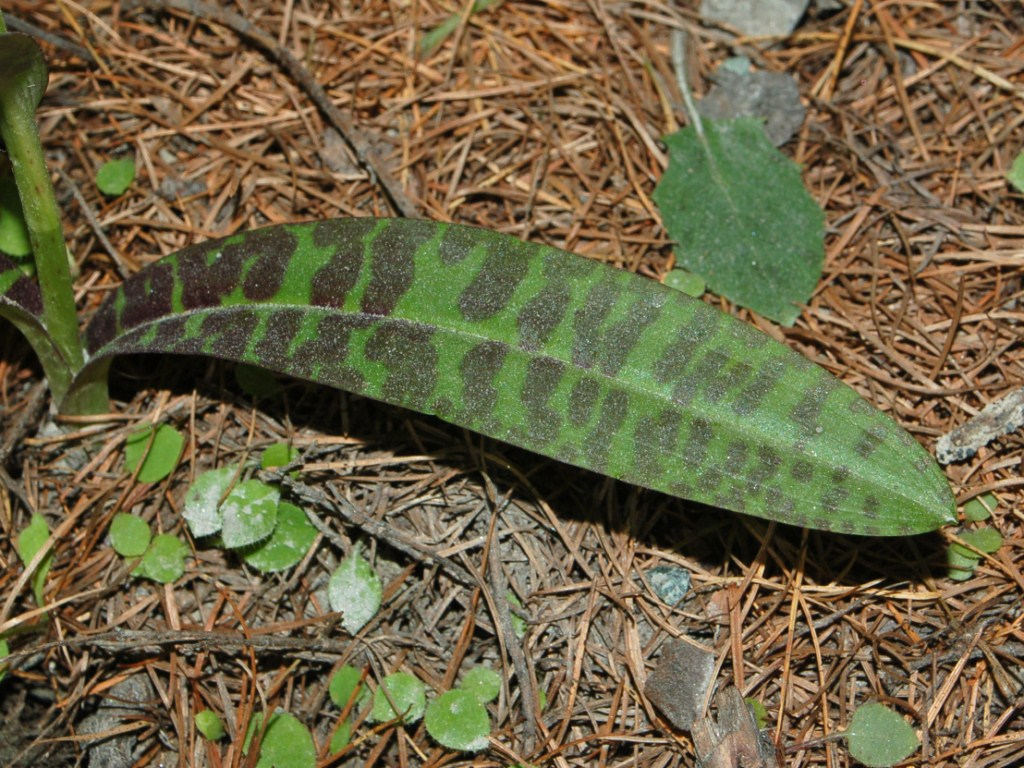
The stained leaf, hence the name "maculata" meaning spotted
