= Giardino delle Orchidee Spontanee del Mediterraneo =

Botanical garden in Italy

Coordinates: 41°57′N 12°05′E

The Giardino delle Orchidee Spontanee del Mediterraneo is a botanical garden operated by the World Wide Fund for Nature within its Palo Laziale nature reserve. It is located Via Palo Laziale 2, Palo Laziale, Ladispoli, Province of Rome, Lazio, Italy.

The collection focuses on native orchid species. It began in 1984 with a donation of 10 Sardinian species from the Orto Botanico dell'Università di Cagliari, and currently contains about 350 specimens representing some 60 species from the genera Ophrys and Orchis, including Orchis palustris, Ophrys apulica, Ophrys lunulata, and Ophrys ciliata, as well as Asphodeline lutea, Dactylorhiza romana, Inula candida, Iris pseudopumila, and Spiranthes aestivalis.

== See also ==
- List of botanical gardens in Italy
