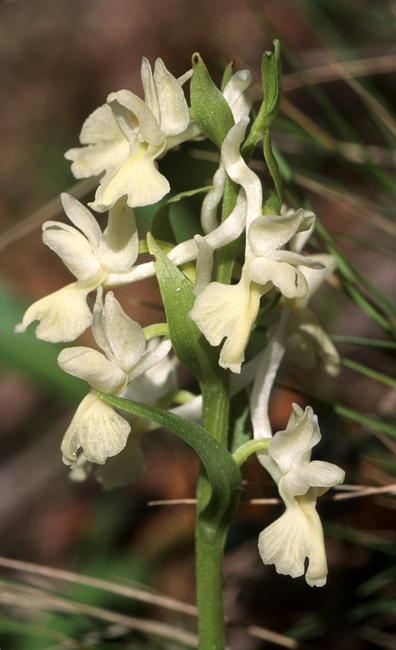

Scientific classification
- Kingdom: Plantae
- Clade: Tracheophytes
- Clade: Angiosperms
- Clade: Monocots
- Order: Asparagales
- Family: Orchidaceae
- Subfamily: Orchidoideae
- Genus: Dactylorhiza
- Species: D. romana

Binomial name
- Dactylorhiza romana (Sebast.) Soó (1962)

Synonyms
- Orchis romana Sebast.; Dactylorhiza sambucina subsp. romana (Sebast.) Bornm.; Dactylorchis romana (Sebast.) Verm.; Orchis georgica (Klinge) Medw.; Orchis flavescens K.Koch; Dactylorchis flavescens (K.Koch) Verm.; Dactylorhiza flavescens (K.Koch) Holub; Dactylorhiza ruprechtii Aver.; Orchis guimaraesii (E.G.Camus) Rivas Goday; Orchis sulphurea Link, invalid; Dactylorhiza sulphurea (Link) Franco, invalid; Orchis lucana Spreng.; Orchis markusii Tineo; Orchis natalis Tineo; Orchis sicula Tineo; Orchis pseudosambucina Ten.; Orchis siciliensis (Klinge) A.W.Hill; Dactylorhiza libanotica (Mouterde) Aver.; Dactylorhiza sicula (Tineo) Aver.; also many more names at the subspecies and variety levels

= Dactylorhiza romana =

Roman dactylorhiza

Species of flowering plant in the orchid family

Dactylorhiza romana, the Roman dactylorhiza, is a species of orchid. It is native to the Mediterranean Region of southern Europe and northern Africa, the range extending eastward to Iran and Turkmenistan.

Three subspecies are recognized:

- Dactylorhiza romana subsp. georgica (Klinge) Soó ex Renz & Taubenheim - Turkey, Caucasus (Armenia, Georgia (country), Azerbaijan, southern Russia), Iran, Turkmenistan
- Dactylorhiza romana subsp. guimaraesii (E.G.Camus) H.A.Pedersen - Spain, Portugal, Algeria, Morocco
- Dactylorhiza romana subsp. romana - Italy, Greece, the Balkans, Turkey, Crimea, Cyprus, Lebanon, Syria
