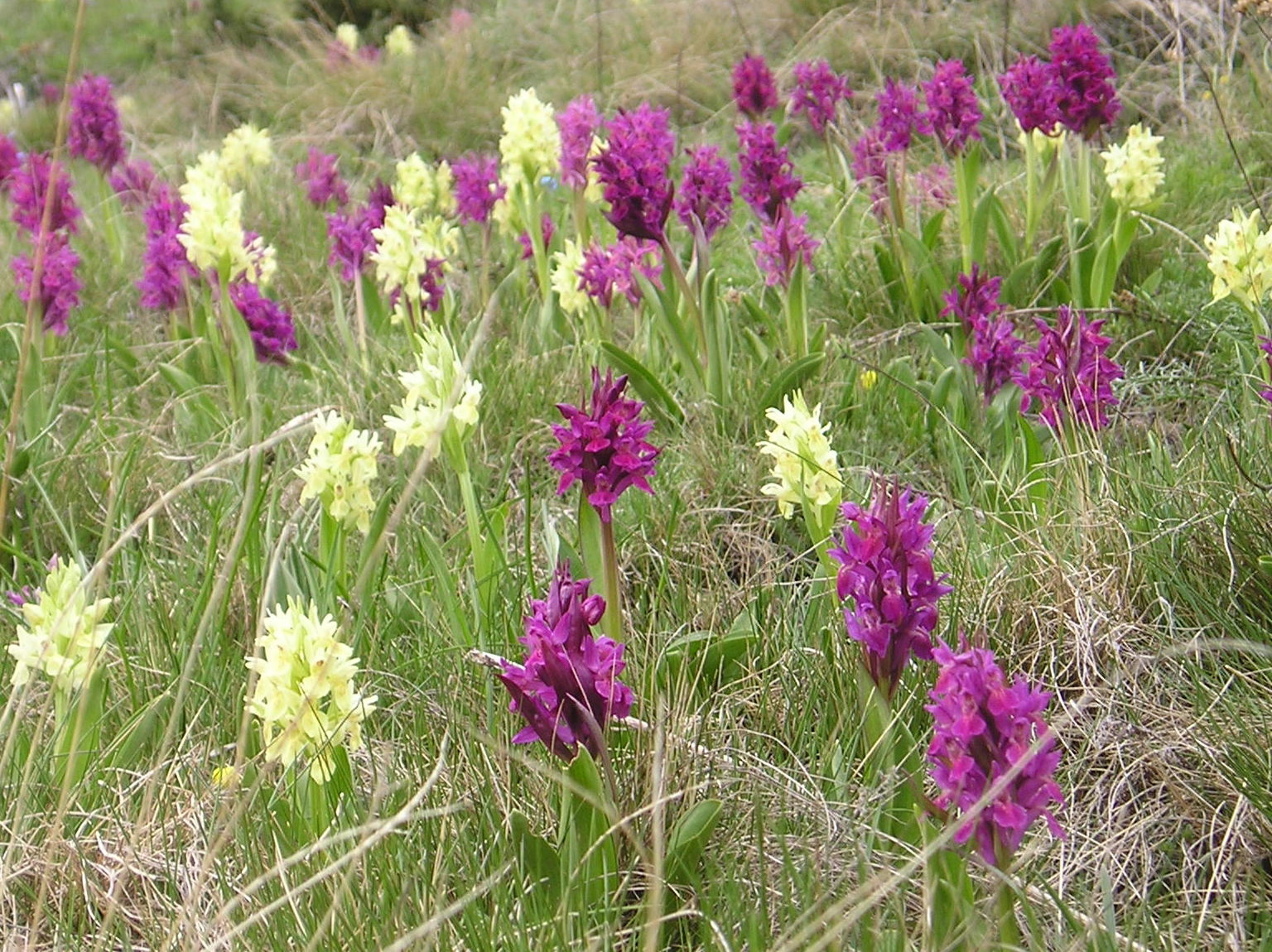

Scientific classification
- Kingdom: Plantae
- Clade: Tracheophytes
- Clade: Angiosperms
- Clade: Monocots
- Order: Asparagales
- Family: Orchidaceae
- Subfamily: Orchidoideae
- Genus: Dactylorhiza
- Species: D. sambucina

Binomial name
- Dactylorhiza sambucina (L.) Soó (1962)

Synonyms
- Orchis sambucina L. (1755) (Basionym); Dactylorchis sambucina (L.) Verm. (1947); Dactylorhiza latifolia (L.) H.Baumann & Kunkele; Orchis lutea Dulac; Orchis incarnata var. sambucina (L.) Lapeyr. ex Bubani; Dactylorchis sambucina (L.) Verm; Orchis schleicheri Sweet; Orchis fasciculata Tineo in G.Gussone; Orchis salina Fronius; Orchis laurentina R.Bolos ex Vayr.; Orchis guffroyi P.Fourn.; Dactylorhiza fasciculata (Tineo) H.Baumann & Künkele; also many names at subspecies and variety levels

= Dactylorhiza sambucina =

Species of flowering plant in the orchid family

Dactylorhiza sambucina, the elder-flowered orchid, is an herbaceous plant belonging to the family Orchidaceae. It is quite common and widespread throughout much of Europe from Portugal east to Finland and Ukraine. The flowers appear in spring and summer, in various colors from yellow to purple.

== Etymology ==
The name of the genus Dactylorhiza is formed from Greek words δάκτυλος "daktylos" meaning "finger" and ρίζα "rhiza" meaning "root" and refers to the tubers of this plant, that are split into several tubercles. The specific Latin name "sambucina" refers to the smell of elder (Sambucus nigra) emanating by some plants of this species.

The scientific binomial name of this plant was initially Orchis sambucina, proposed by the Swedish naturalist and botanist Carl Linnaeus in 1755. The name was subsequently amended to the one currently accepted (Dactylorhiza sambucina), by the Hungarian botanist Károly Rezső Soó in 1962.

== Description ==
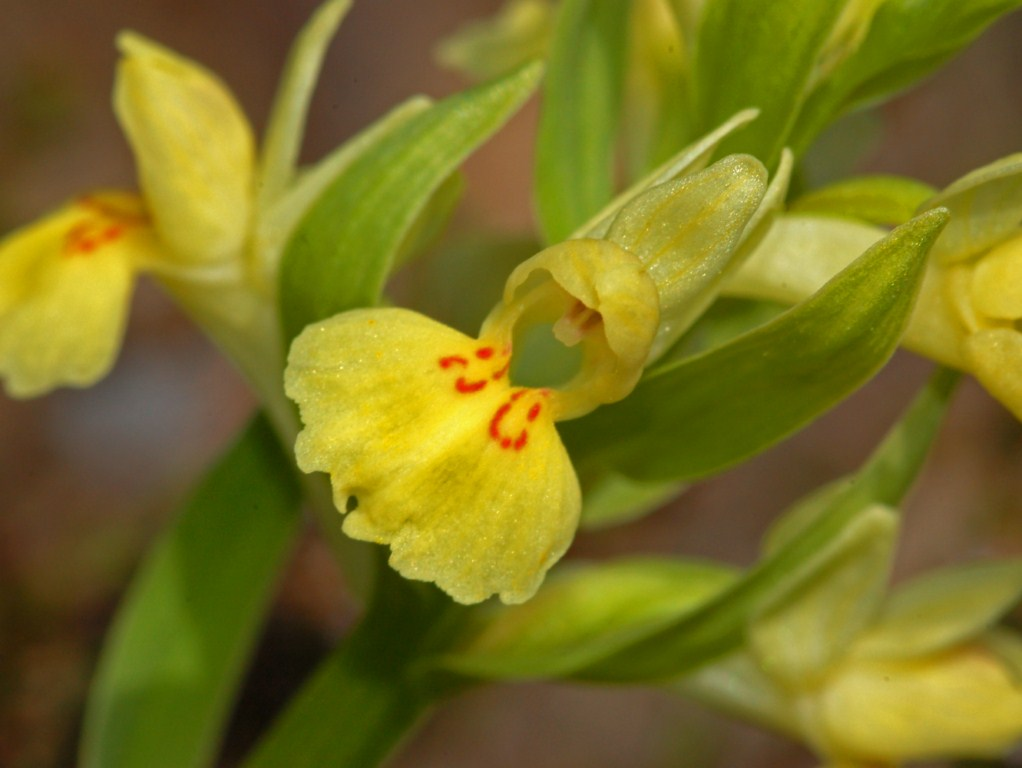

Dactylorhiza sambucina reaches on average 10–40 centimetres (3.9–15.7 in) in height. These plants are geophytes with underground tubers that annually produce new stems, leaves and flowers.

The leaves are amplexicaul and vary from 4 to 7 per plant. The lower leaves are oblong-obovate with obtuse apex, while the upper leaves are lanceolate with acute apex. Size of leaves: width 1 to 2.5 cm, length 6 – 12 cm.

The underground part of the stem has two tubers each one more or less deeply divided into several lobes (a characteristic of the genus Dactylorhiza), the first one plays the important functions of supplying the stem, while the secondary ones collect nutrient materials for the development of the plant that will form in the coming year.

The inflorescence is 5–10 centimetres (2.0–3.9 in) long and it is composed of flowers gathered in a dense spike. The flowers grow in the axils of bracts that are membranous and lanceolate-shaped. The flowers appear from mid-April to early July. Their colors vary from yellow with light reddish stains or purple speckled with darker spots on the labellum.

They are hermaphrodite and pollinated by insects (entomophily), especially bumblebees (Bombus species). These orchids are almost without nectar, but they are visited by various pollinator insects as they are confused with other plants with nectar. The seed germination is conditioned by the presence of specific fungi.

== Distribution ==
Dactylorhiza sambucina is quite common and widespread throughout much of Europe from Portugal east to Finland and Ukraine. It is absent from the British Isles, the Low Countries, the Dinaric Alps and less frequent on the north side of the Alps.

== Habitat and ecology ==
The elder-flowered orchid prefers fresh or dry meadows (subalpine and alpine grasslands), light woods and clearings or scrubland. They grow on siliceous and calcareous substrate, at an altitude of 300–2,000 metres (980–6,560 ft) above sea level, although locally, for instance in Uppland, Sweden, they can be found at sea level as well. The germination behavior, plant longevity, and soil requirements have recently been reviewed for the "Biological flora of Europe".

== Gallery ==
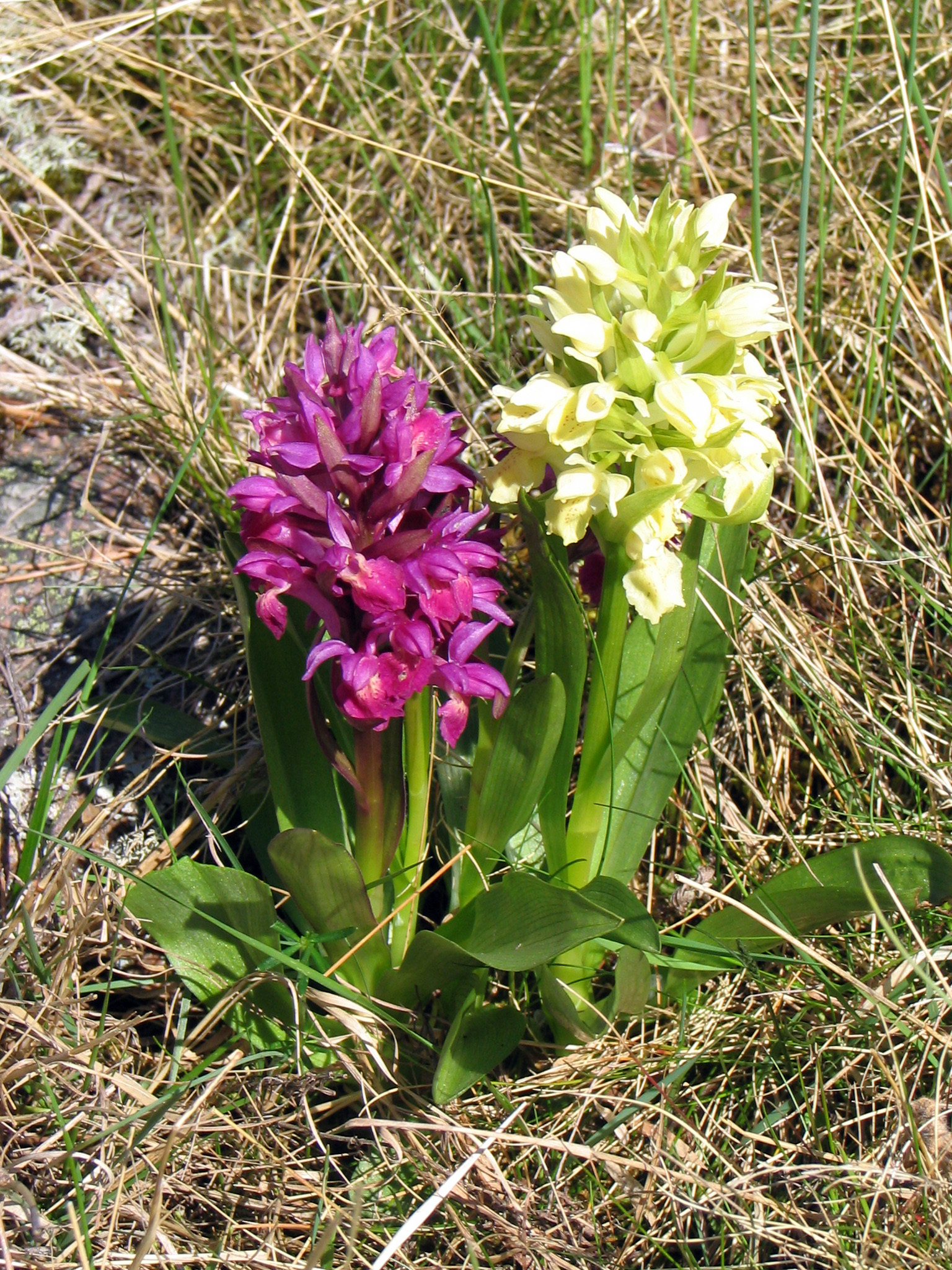

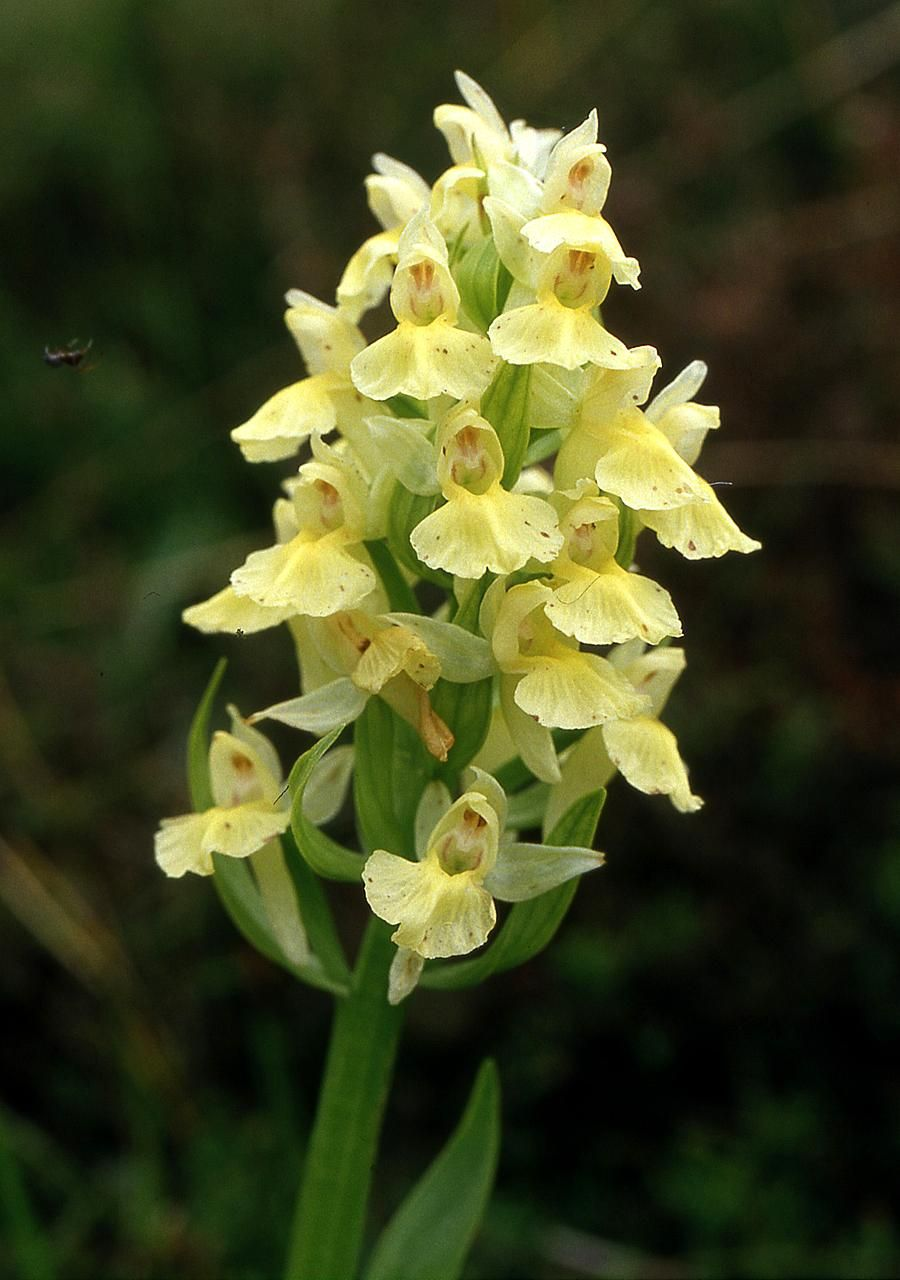
