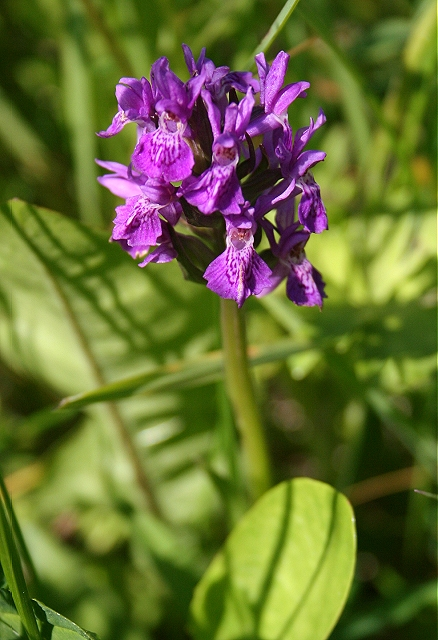

Scientific classification
- Kingdom: Plantae
- Clade: Tracheophytes
- Clade: Angiosperms
- Clade: Monocots
- Order: Asparagales
- Family: Orchidaceae
- Subfamily: Orchidoideae
- Genus: Dactylorhiza
- Species: D. purpurella

Binomial name
- Dactylorhiza purpurella (T.Stephenson & T.A.Stephenson) Soó (1962)

Synonyms
- Orchis purpurella T.Stephenson & T.A.Stephenson (1920) (Basionym); Dactylorchis purpurella (T.Stephenson & T.A.Stephenson) Verm. (1947); Dactylorhiza majalis ssp. purpurella (T.Stephenson & T.A.Stephenson) D.M.Moore & Soó (1978); Dactylorhiza majalis var. purpurella (T.Stephenson & T.A.Stephenson) R.M.Bateman & Denholm (1983); Dactylorhiza cambrensis (R.H.Roberts) Aver.; also several more varietal names proposed

= Dactylorhiza purpurella =

Northern marsh orchid

Species of flowering plant

Dactylorhiza purpurella, the northern marsh orchid, is an orchid native to Great Britain, Ireland, the Netherlands, Denmark and Norway.

Two varieties are recognised:

- Dactylorhiza purpurella var. cambrensis (R.H.Roberts) R.M.Bateman & Denholm - coastal Great Britain and Denmark
- Dactylorhiza purpurella subsp. purpurella - Ireland and northern Great Britain. Recorded from Co. Donegal in Ireland.

== Description ==
Dactylorhiza purpurella is a perennial terrestrial orchid native to north-western Europe. It typically grows to a height of 10–15 cm, though it can occasionally reach 40 cm. The plant develops from tuberous roots that are finger-like (digitate) in form, long and tapering.

The stem is somewhat compressible, with the solid central portion comprising more than half of its diameter. The plant remains dormant during winter, with leaves emerging in early spring. It produces 4–8 leaves that grow along the stem (cauline) but are often clustered toward the base. These leaves are keeled (folded along the midrib), lance-shaped (lanceolate), and taper to a fine point. They are widest in the middle, measuring 7–12 cm long (occasionally up to 16 cm) and 1.7–3.0 cm wide (occasionally up to 3.5 cm). The upper surface of the leaves often displays small spots that are either regularly distributed or concentrated at the tips, though these markings are frequently indistinct. Unlike some related orchid species, D. purpurella never develops large spots, rings, or blotches on its leaves.

The inflorescence (flowering structure) is compact and relatively short (3–5 cm, occasionally up to 10 cm), with an ovoid to somewhat cylindrical shape that appears flattened at the top. It bears 10–30 flowers (occasionally up to 80) of bright purple or reddish-purple colouration. The lower bracts (modified leaves) that support the flowers are purplish and barely exceed the length of the flowers themselves.

The flowers display broad, erect sepals; the lateral sepals measure 6.0–8.5 mm long and 2.5–3.5 mm wide, while the dorsal sepal forms a hood-like structure with the petals. The petals themselves can reach 5–6 mm in length. The labellum (lip) is approximately flat, measuring about 6 mm long (range 5–9 mm) and 8 mm wide (range 6–12 mm), with slightly reflexed edges. The labellum has a blunt diamond shape that is barely divided into three lobes, if at all, and features prominent markings primarily near the midline. The spur (a tubular projection) is stout, measuring 6–10 mm in length (shorter than the ovary) and 2.0–3.5 mm in width.

As an allotetraploid species, D. purpurella possesses 80 chromosomes (2n = 4x = 80), having originated through hybridisation between the diploid species Dactylorhiza fuchsii (common spotted orchid) and Dactylorhiza incarnata (early Marsh Orchid).

== Taxonomy ==
Dactylorhiza purpurella (northern marsh orchid) was first recognized as a distinct species in 1920, when it was described as Orchis purpurella by the British botanists Thomas Stephenson and Thomas Alan Stephenson. The original description was based on specimens growing in a hay meadow near Aberystwyth in West Wales, with additional reference to material from the English Lake District and the Isle of Arran. Despite its distinctive appearance, its recognition as a separate species came relatively late, with Jocelyn Brooke and Gavin Bone (1950) noting that "many British botanists–wherever they may have happened to live–seem to have possessed ... a blindspot where the marsh orchids are concerned".

The species was later transferred to the genus Dactylorhiza by Rezső Soó in 1962, resulting in its current scientific name Dactylorhiza purpurella. It has also been classified under other names, including Dactylorchis purpurella. The taxonomy of Dactylorhiza is complex, with many taxa treated at different taxonomic levels by different authorities. D. purpurella itself has been variously treated as a distinct species, a subspecies, or a variety. Some taxonomists include it within a broader concept of Dactylorhiza majalis, classifying it as D. majalis subsp. purpurella or D. majalis var. purpurella.

Genetically, D. purpurella is an allotetraploid species that arose from hybridisation between the diploid species Dactylorhiza fuchsii and Dactylorhiza incarnata or their ancestors. It shares this parentage with several other north-western and central European allotetraploids, including D. baltica, D. elatior, D. majali, D. praetermissa (southern marsh orchid), and D. traunsteineri. Another closely related taxon is D. francis-drucei, which has a particularly complicated taxonomic history, having been variously included in D. majalis, D. traunsteineri, or D. traunsteinerioides by different authorities.

Despite their shared ancestry, genetic evidence indicates that these allotetraploid taxa formed at different times and in different places, and they exhibit distinctive morphology and ecological preferences. For this reason, many contemporary taxonomists, including Brandrud et al. (2020), treat them as separate species rather than subspecies or varieties of a single species.

Like other members of Dactylorhiza, D. purpurella hybridises readily with related species, including D. fuchsii, D. incarnata, D. maculata, D. praetermissa, and D. viridis (frog orchid, formerly classified as Coeloglossum viride). Hybrids with species from other genera, such as Gymnadenia (fragrant orchids), have also been recorded.
