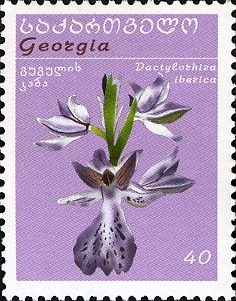
- A Georgian stamp featuring Dactylorhiza iberica.

Scientific classification
- Kingdom: Plantae
- Clade: Tracheophytes
- Clade: Angiosperms
- Clade: Monocots
- Order: Asparagales
- Family: Orchidaceae
- Subfamily: Orchidoideae
- Genus: Dactylorhiza
- Species: D. iberica

Binomial name
- Dactylorhiza iberica (M.Bieb. ex Willd.) Soó

Synonyms
- Orchis iberica M.Bieb. ex Willd. (basionym); Dactylorchis iberica (M.Bieb. ex Willd.) Verm.; Gymnadenia angustifolia (M.Bieb.) Spreng.; Orchis angustifolia M.Bieb.; Orchis angustifolia var. fraasii Rchb.f.; Orchis angustifolia var. longifolia (K.Koch) Rchb.f.; Orchis angustifolia var. stevenii Rchb.f.; Orchis iberica var. fraasii Rchb.f.; Orchis iberica f. leptophylla E.G.Camus; Orchis iberica var. longifolia (K.Koch) Rchb.f.; Orchis iberica var. stevenii Rchb.f.; Orchis leptophylla K.Koch; Orchis leptophylla var. laxa K.Koch; Orchis leptophylla var. longifolia K.Koch; Orchis natolica Fisch. & C.A.Mey.

= Dactylorhiza iberica =

Species of plant in the Orchid family

Dactylorhiza iberica is a species of herbaceous perennial plant in the orchid family (Orchidaceae). It grows in montane marshes and on stream banks from Greece to Iran.

== Description ==
Dactylorhiza iberica is a slender, delicate orchid, with stems from 15 to 50 cm tall carrying an inflorescence of 6 to 10 flowers. The flowers are rose pink, or rarely white or purple, the labellum is spotted with magenta and three-lobed, and the lateral sepals form the hood along with the petals and dorsal sepal, which are marked with veins. The spur is thin, curved, and shorter than the ovary. The three to five linear-lanceolate leaves are unspotted, and the bracts are thin but longer than the ovary.

== Distribution and habitat ==
Dactylorhiza iberica grows in marshes and shaded stream banks above 800m. It is found in Greece, Turkey, Crimea, the Caucasus, Iran, Cyprus, and Lebanon. It flowers from May to August.
