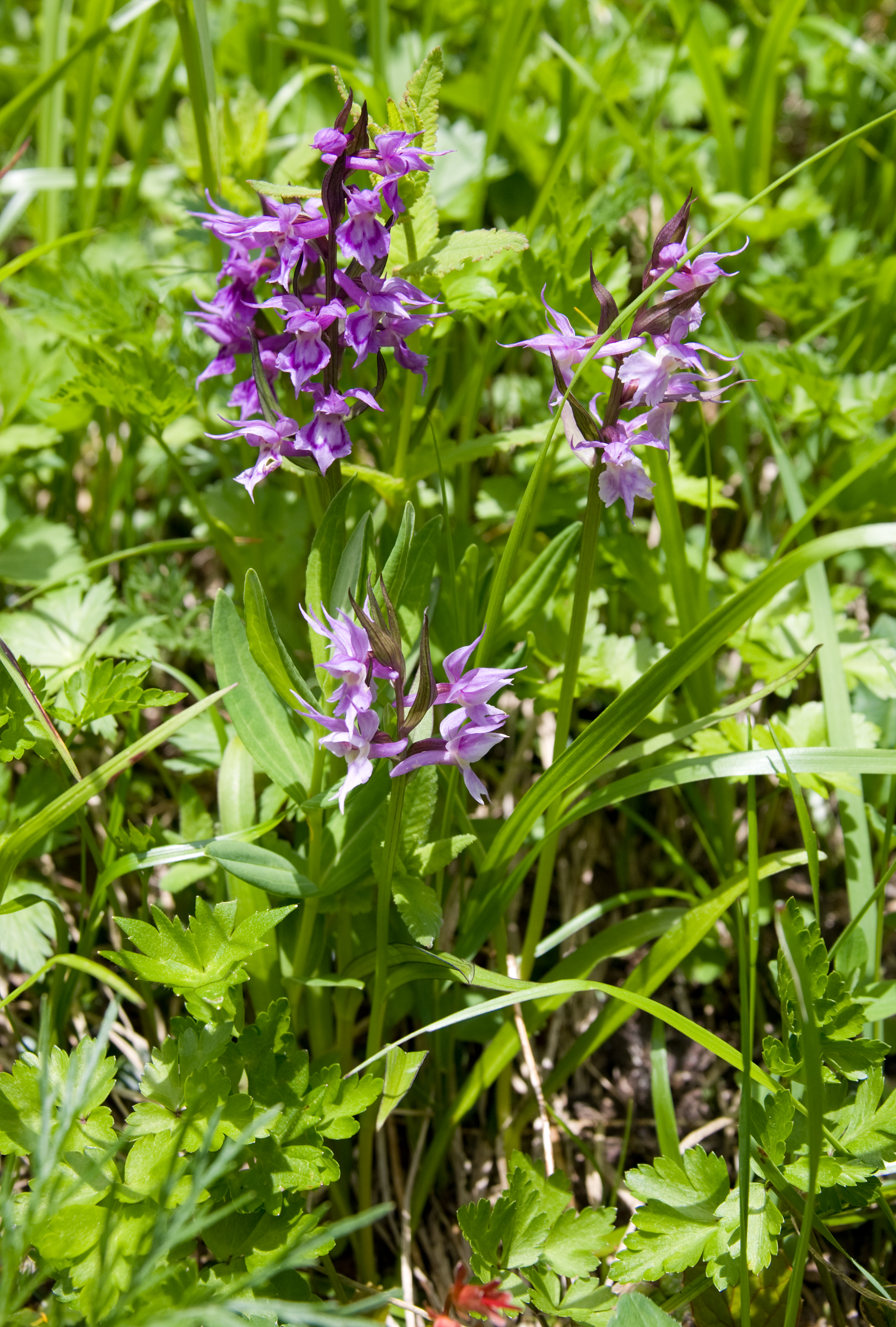

Conservation status
- Apparently Secure (NatureServe)

Scientific classification
- Kingdom: Plantae
- Clade: Tracheophytes
- Clade: Angiosperms
- Clade: Monocots
- Order: Asparagales
- Family: Orchidaceae
- Subfamily: Orchidoideae
- Genus: Dactylorhiza
- Species: D. aristata

Binomial name
- Dactylorhiza aristata (Fisch. ex Lindl.) Soó (1962)

Synonyms
- Orchis aristata Fisch. ex Lindl. (1835) (Basionym); Orchis latifolia var. beeringiana Cham. (1828); Orchis beeringiana (Cham.) Kudô (1922); Orchis aristata var. immaculata Makino (1932); Orchis aristata var. maculata Makino (1932); Orchis aristata var. perbracteata Lepage (1952); Dactylorhiza aristata var. kodiakensis Luer & G.M. Luer (1972); Dactylorhiza aristata f. perbracteata (Lepage) Catling (1982); Dactylorhiza aristata f. alba P.M.Br. (2005); Dactylorhiza aristata f. rosea P.M.Br. (1995); Dactylorhiza aristata f. albomaculata P.M.Br. (2005)

= Dactylorhiza aristata =

Keyflower

Species of flowering plant in the orchid family

Dactylorhiza aristata, the keyflower, is a species of orchid. It is native to Japan, Korea, northeastern China (Hebei, Henan, Shandong, Shanxi), the Russian Far East, and Alaska (including the Aleutians).
