= Dactylorhiza cantabrica =

Scientific classification
- Kingdom: Plantae
- Clade: Tracheophytes
- Clade: Angiosperms
- Clade: Monocots
- Order: Asparagales
- Family: Orchidaceae
- Subfamily: Orchidoideae
- Genus: Dactylorhiza
- Species: D. cantabrica

Binomial name
- Dactylorhiza cantabrica H.A.Pedersen (2006)

Synonyms
- Dactylorhiza sambucina subsp. cantabrica (H.A.Pedersen) Kreutz (2007)

Species of orchid

Dactylorhiza cantabrica is a species of orchid. It is a tuberous geophyte native to northwestern Spain.
