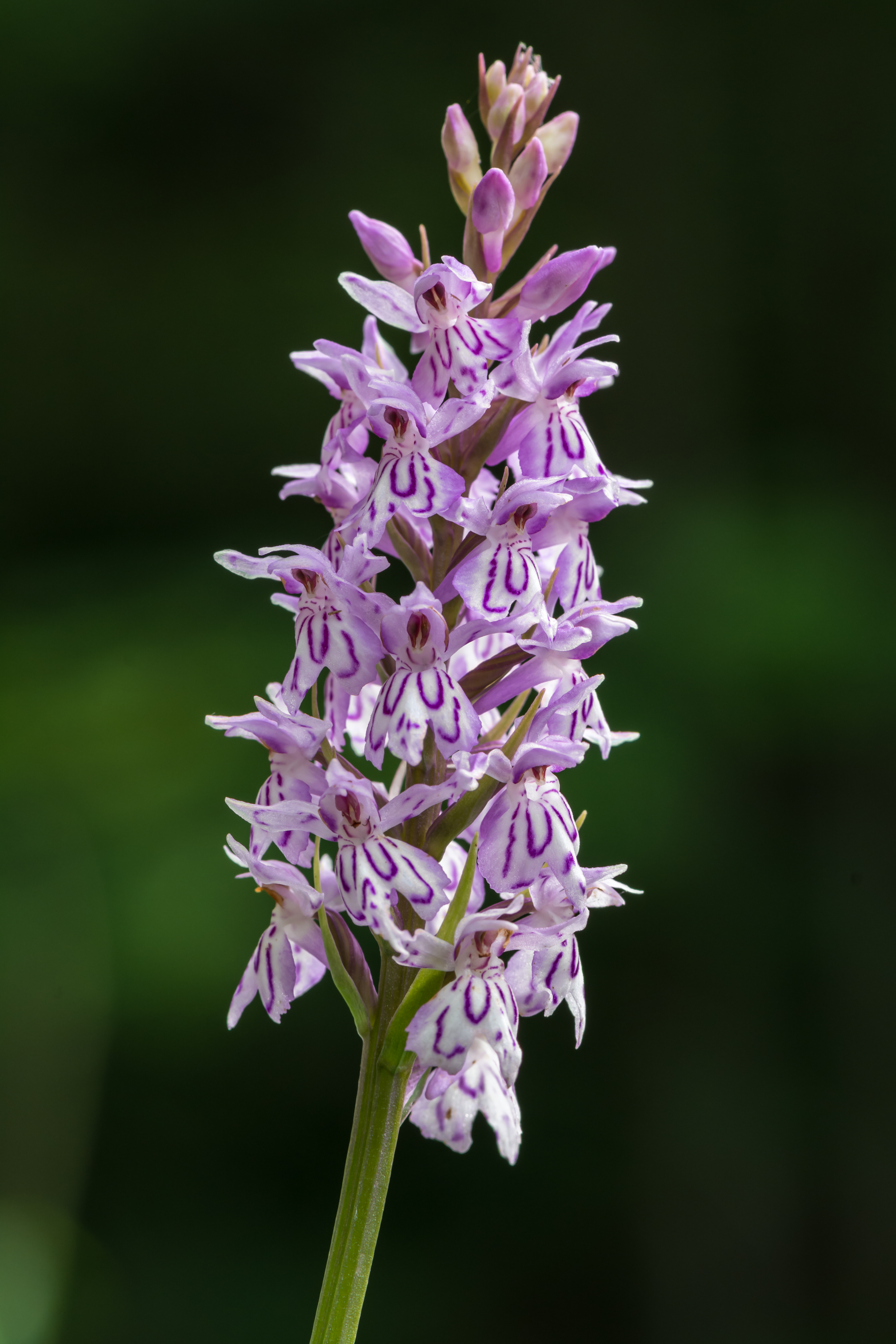
- Common spotted orchid (Dactylorhiza fuchsii)

Scientific classification
- Kingdom: Plantae
- Clade: Embryophytes
- Clade: Tracheophytes
- Clade: Angiosperms
- Clade: Monocots
- Order: Asparagales
- Family: Orchidaceae
- Subfamily: Orchidoideae
- Tribe: Orchideae
- Subtribe: Orchidinae
- Genus: Dactylorhiza; Neck. ex Nevski, 1937

Synonyms
- Coeloglossum Hartm.; × Dactyloglossum P.F. Hunt & Summerh.; Dactylorchis (Klinge) Verm.; Dactylorrhiza Neck., rejected name; Diplorrhiza Ehrh.; Entaticus Gray, illegitimate superfluous name; Satorkis Thouars, illegitimate superfluous name; Satyrium L. 1753, rejected name, not the accepted name Sw. 1800; Streptogyne Rchb.f.

= Dactylorhiza =

Genus of orchids

Dactylorhiza is a genus of flowering plants in the orchid family Orchidaceae. Its species are commonly called marsh orchids or spotted orchids. Dactylorhiza were previously classified under Orchis, which has two round tubers.

== Description ==
They are hardy tuberous geophytes. In a thickened underground stem, they can store a large amount of water to survive arid conditions. The tuber is flattened and finger-like. The long leaves are lanceolate and, in most species, also speckled. They grow along a rather long stem which reaches a height of 70–90 cm (28–35 in). Leaves higher on the stem are shorter than leaves lower on the stem. The inflorescence, compared to the length of the plant, is rather short. It consists of a compact raceme with 25-50 flowers. These develop from axillary buds. The dominant colors are white and all shades of pink to red, sprinkled with darker speckles.

== Taxonomy ==
=== Etymology ===
The name Dactylorhiza is derived from Greek words δάκτυλος daktylos 'finger' and ῥίζα rhiza 'root', referring to the palmately two- to five-lobed tubers of this genus.

=== Species ===
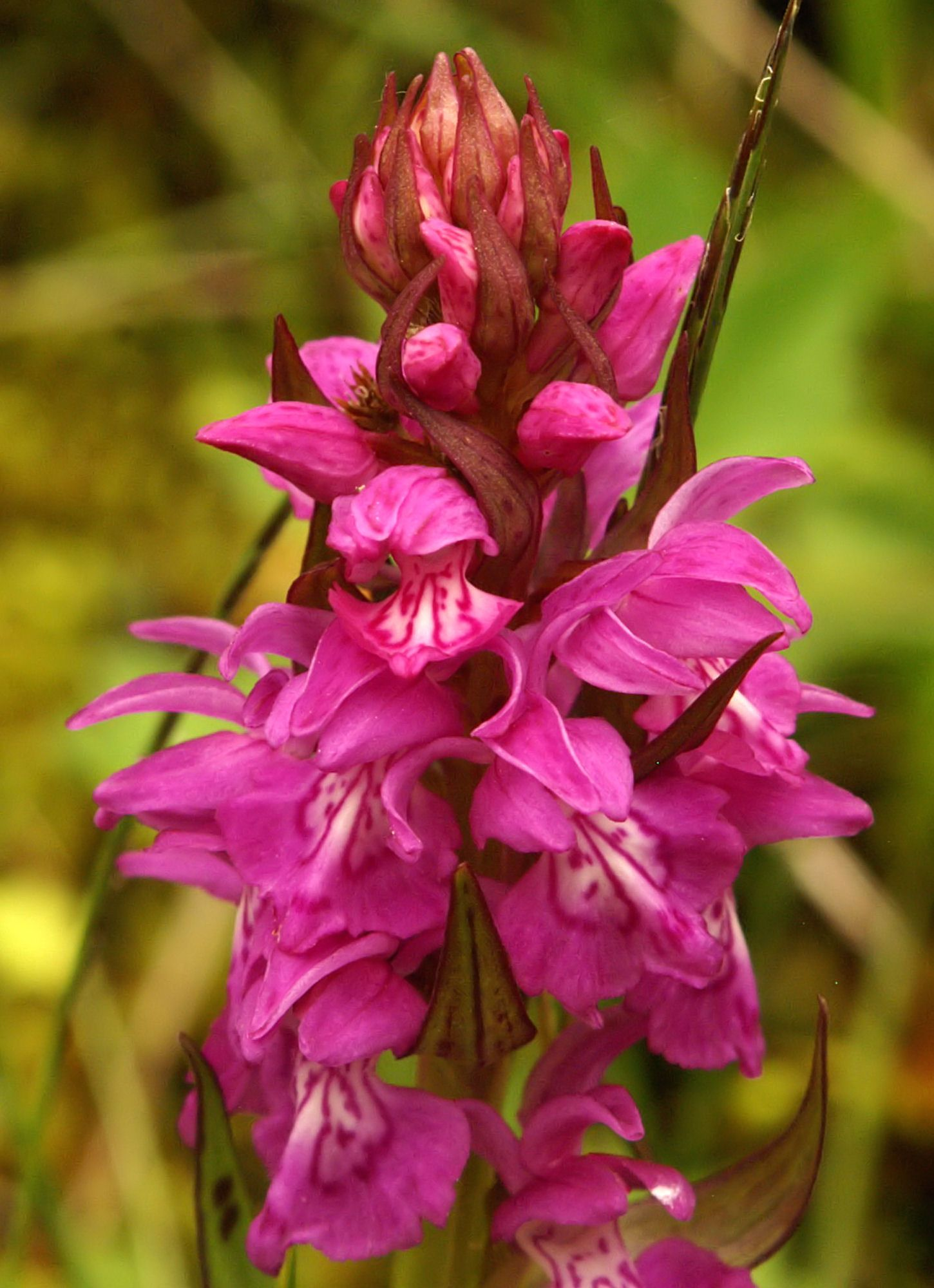
Dactylorhiza cordigera ssp. pindica

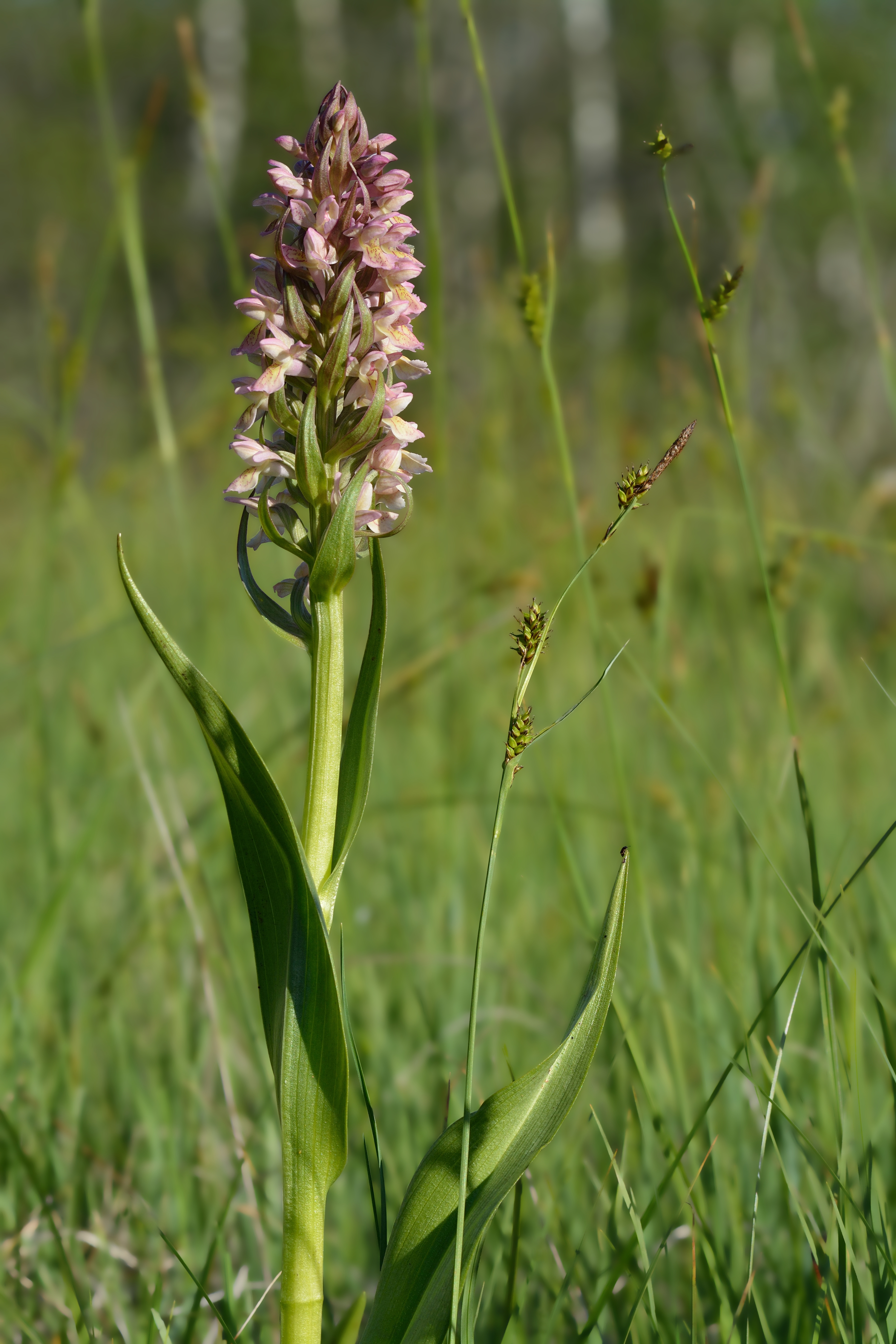
Dactylorhiza incarnata nothosubsp. versicolor

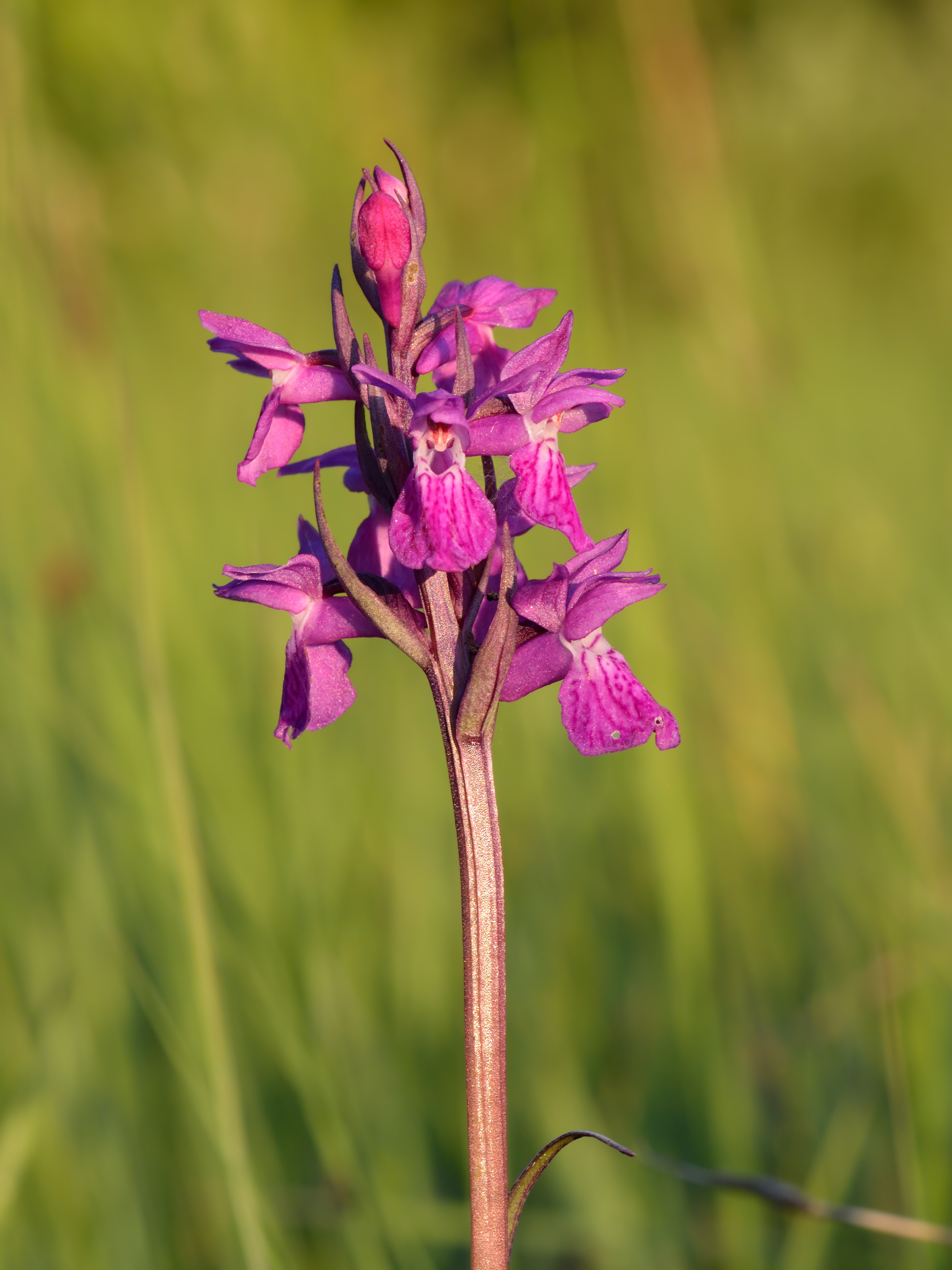
Dactylorhiza russowii

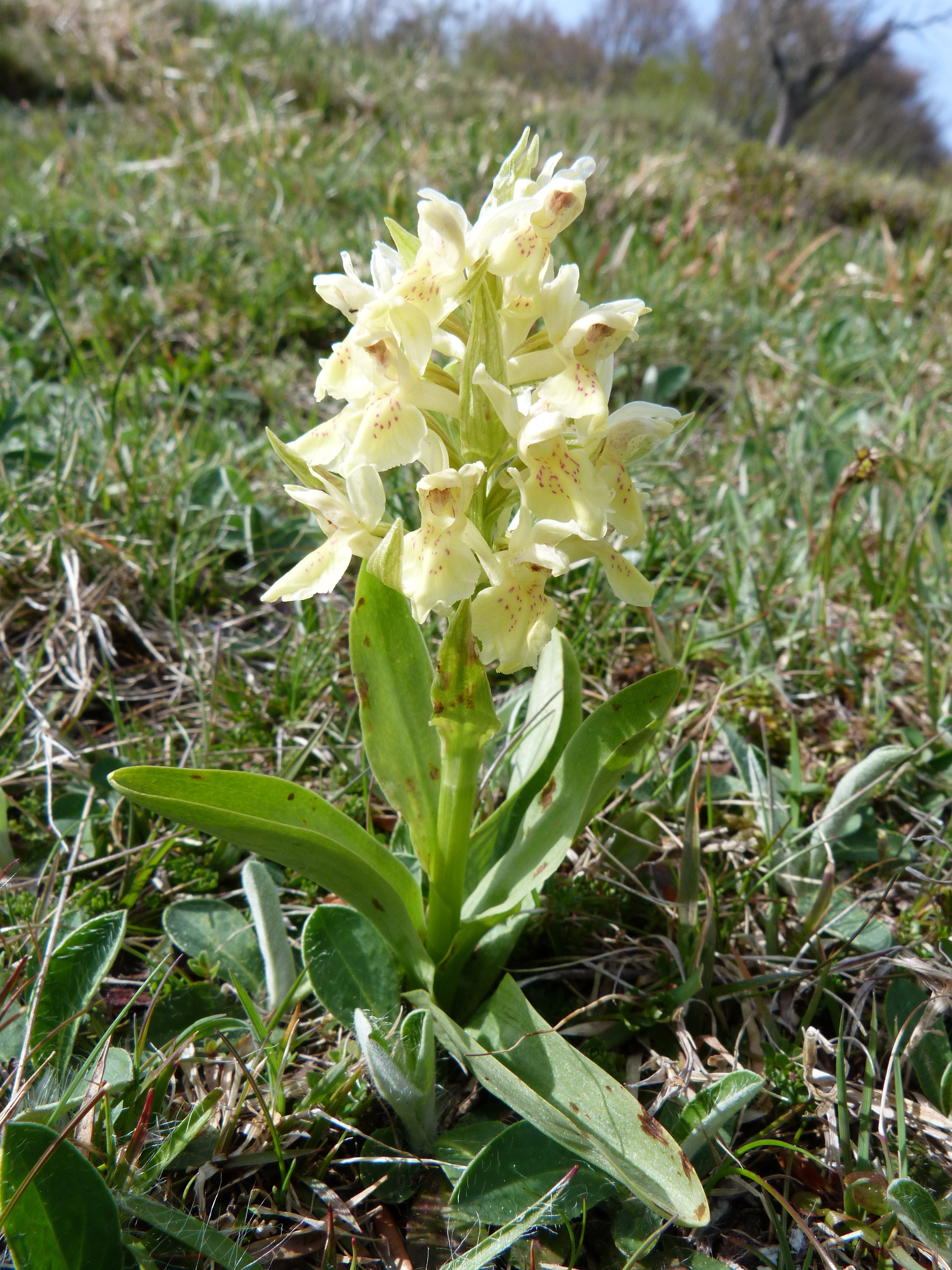
Elder-flowered orchid (Dactylorhiza sambucina)

Many species in this genus hybridise so readily that species boundaries themselves are vague (but see), with regular name changes and no clear answers. A few species colonise very well onto fresh industrial wastes such as pulverised fuel ash, where vast hybrid swarms can appear for a decade or more, before ecological succession replaces them.

34 species are accepted.

- Dactylorhiza aristata (Fisch. ex Lindl.) Soó – keyflower, eastern China to southern Alaska
- Dactylorhiza armeniaca Hedrén – Turkey and western Transcaucasia
- Dactylorhiza bucovina Kreutz, Bobocea & Brădeanu – Romania
- Dactylorhiza cantabrica H.A.Pedersen – northwestern Spain
- Dactylorhiza cyrnea W.Foelsche & Cord-Landwehr – Corsica
- Dactylorhiza czerniakowskae Aver. – Central Asia
- Dactylorhiza elata (Poir.) Soó – stately Dactylorhiza, western Europe to northwestern Africa
- Dactylorhiza elcitoi Benigni, Barigelli & Petroselli – eastern Italy
- Dactylorhiza euxina (Nevski) Czerep. – north-central and northeastern Turkey and the Caucasus
- Dactylorhiza foliosa (Rchb.f.) Soó – richly leaved Dactylorhiza, Madeira
- Dactylorhiza francis-drucei (Wilmott) Aver. – Great Britain and Ireland
  - Dactylorhiza francis-drucei var. ebudensis (Wief. ex R.M.Bateman & Denholm) R.M.Bateman & Denholm
  - Dactylorhiza francis-drucei subsp. francis-drucei
  - Dactylorhiza francis-drucei subsp. traunsteinerioides (Pugsley) R.M.Bateman & Denholm
- Dactylorhiza fuchsii (Druce) Soó – common spotted orchid, Fuch's dactylorhiza (Europe to Siberia)
- Dactylorhiza gervasiana (Tod.) H.Baumann & Künkele – Southern Italy, Corsica, Sicily, and Algeria
- Dactylorhiza graggeriana (Soó) Soó – western Himalayas
- Dactylorhiza hatagirea (D.Don) Soó – Pakistan, Himalayas, Tibet, Xinjiang, Mongolia and northern and central China
- Dactylorhiza iberica (M.Bieb. ex Willd.) Soó – Greece, Turkey, Levant, Caucasus, and Iran
- Dactylorhiza incarnata (L.) Soó – early marsh orchid, Europe to western and central Asia, Siberia, and Mongolia
  - Dactylorhiza incarnata subsp. cilicica (Klinge) H.Sund.
  - Dactylorhiza incarnata subsp. coccinea (Pugsley) Soó
  - Dactylorhiza incarnata subsp. cruenta (O.F.Müll.) P.D.Sell – (Europe to Turkey)
  - Dactylorhiza incarnata subsp. gemmana (Pugsley) P.D.Sell – (W. Europe)
  - Dactylorhiza incarnata subsp. incarnata – (Europe to Mongolia).
  - Dactylorhiza incarnata nothosubsp. krylovii (Soó) ined. – (W. Europe to Siberia).
  - Dactylorhiza incarnata subsp. ochroleuca (Wüstnei ex Boll) P.F.Hunt & Summerh. – (Europe)
  - Dactylorhiza incarnata subsp. pulchella (Druce) Soó – (Europe)
  - Dactylorhiza incarnata nothosubsp. versicolor (J.C.Schmidt ex Lüscher) Potucek – (Europe)
- Dactylorhiza insularis (Sommier) Landwehr – island Dactylorhiza, Spain, Portugal, France, Italy, Corsica, Sardinia, and Morocco
- Dactylorhiza isculana Seiser – Austria
- Dactylorhiza kafiriana Renz – northeastern Afghanistan to western Himalayas
- Dactylorhiza kulikalonica Chernyak. – Central Asia
- Dactylorhiza maculata (L.) Soó – heath spotted orchid or moorland spotted orchid, northwestern Africa, Europe, Turkey, Siberia, Mongolia, and Xinjiang
  - Dactylorhiza maculata subsp. maculata – (Europe to Siberia)
  - Dactylorhiza maculata subsp. maurusia (Emb. & Maire) Soó – (Morocco)
  - Dactylorhiza maculata subsp. saccifera (Brongn.) Diklic
  - Dactylorhiza maculata subsp. sooana Borsos ex Batoušek
  - Dactylorhiza maculata nothosubsp. transiens (Druce) M.H.J.van der Meer
- Dactylorhiza magna (Czerniak.) Ikonn. – Central Asia
- Dactylorhiza majalis (Rchb.) P.F.Hunt & Summerh. – broad-leaved marsh orchid western marsh orchid, fan orchid, or common marsh orchid, Europe
  - Dactylorhiza majalis subsp. baltica (Klinge) H.Sund.
  - Dactylorhiza majalis subsp. calcifugiens H.A.Pedersen – (Denmark)
  - Dactylorhiza majalis subsp. cordigera (Fr.) H.Sund.
  - Dactylorhiza majalis subsp. elatior (Fr.) Hedrén & H.A.Pedersen
  - Dactylorhiza majalis nothosubsp. godferyana (Soó) M.H.J.van der Meer
  - Dactylorhiza majalis subsp. kalopissii (E.Nelson) H.A.Pedersen, P.J.Cribb & Rolf Kühn
  - Dactylorhiza majalis subsp. lapponica (Laest. ex Hartm.) H.Sund. (synonyms Dactylorhiza lapponica (Laest.ex Hartm.) Soó and Dactylorhiza traunsteineri (Saut. ex Rchb.) Soó) – (Europe to western Siberia)
  - Dactylorhiza majalis subsp. macedonica (J.Hölz. & Künkele) H.A.Pedersen, P.J.Cribb & Rolf Kühn
  - Dactylorhiza majalis subsp. majalis – (Europe)
  - Dactylorhiza majalis subsp. nieschalkiorum (H.Baumann & Künkele) H.A.Pedersen, P.J.Cribb & Rolf Kühn
  - Dactylorhiza majalis subsp. occidentalis (Pugsley) P.D.Sell (synonym Dactylorhiza kerryensis (Wilmott) P.F. Hunt & Summerh.) – Irish marsh orchid (W. & SW. Ireland, N. Great Britain)
  - Dactylorhiza majalis subsp. pindica (B.Willing & E.Willing) H.A.Pedersen, P.J.Cribb & Rolf Kühn
  - Dactylorhiza majalis subsp. praetermissa (Druce) D.M.Moore & Soó (synonym Dactylorhiza praetermissa (Druce) Soó) – leopard marsh orchid, southern marsh orchid (W. & NW. Europe)
  - Dactylorhiza majalis subsp. pythagorae (Gölz & H.R.Reinhard) H.A.Pedersen, P.J.Cribb & Rolf Kühn – (Samos)
  - Dactylorhiza majalis subsp. sphagnicola (Höppner) H.A.Pedersen & Hedrén
- Dactylorhiza phoenissa (B.Baumann & H.Baumann) P.Delforge – Lebanon
- Dactylorhiza purpurella (T.Stephenson & T.A.Stephenson) Soó – northern marsh orchid, Great Britain and Ireland
  - Dactylorhiza purpurella var. cambrensis (R.H.Roberts) R.M.Bateman & Denholm
  - Dactylorhiza purpurella var. purpurella
- Dactylorhiza romana (Sebast.) Soó – Roman Dactylorhiza, Mediterranean, Caucasus, and western Asia
  - Dactylorhiza romana subsp. georgica (Klinge) Soó ex Renz & Taubenheim
  - Dactylorhiza romana subsp. guimaraesii (E.G.Camus) H.A.Pedersen
  - Dactylorhiza romana subsp. romana – Markus' Dactylorhiza (N. Portugal to W. Spain and Italy).
- Dactylorhiza russowii (Klinge) Holub – Germany to Finland and eastern European Russia to central Siberia
- Dactylorhiza sajanensis Stepanov – central Siberia
- Dactylorhiza salina (Turcz. ex Lindl.) Soó – Caucasus to Central Asia and Amur
- Dactylorhiza sambucina (L.) Soó – elder-flowered orchid, Europe (Photos)
- Dactylorhiza sibirica Efimov – central Siberia
- Dactylorhiza stortonii Benigni, Mandozzi, Monaldi, Barigelli & Petroselli – eastern Italy
- Dactylorhiza urvilleana (Steud.) H.Baumann & Künkele – northern and northeastern Turkey, Caucasus, and Iran
- Dactylorhiza viridis (L.) R.M.Bateman, Pridgeon & M.W.Chase – Frog orchid, subarctic and subalpine Northern Hemisphere
  - Dactylorhiza viridis var. virescens (Muhl. ex Willd.) Baumbach – (Temp. Asia, N. America)
  - Dactylorhiza viridis var. viridis – (subarctic and subalpine Northern Hemisphere)

=== Hybrids ===
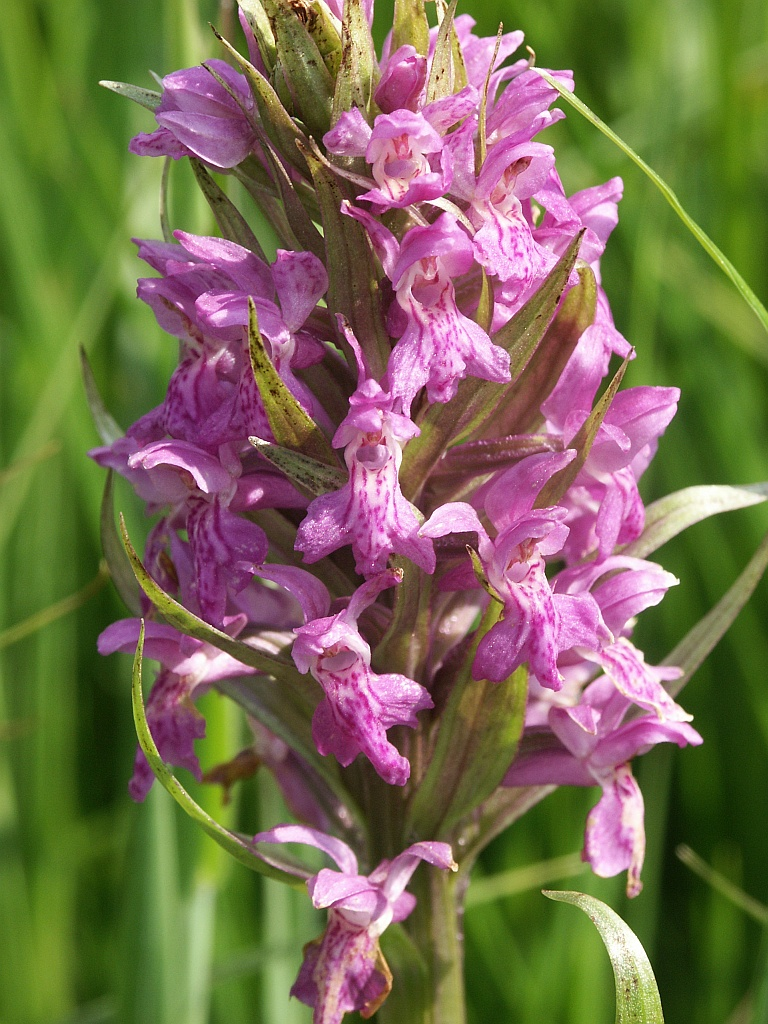
Dactylorhiza × aschersoniana

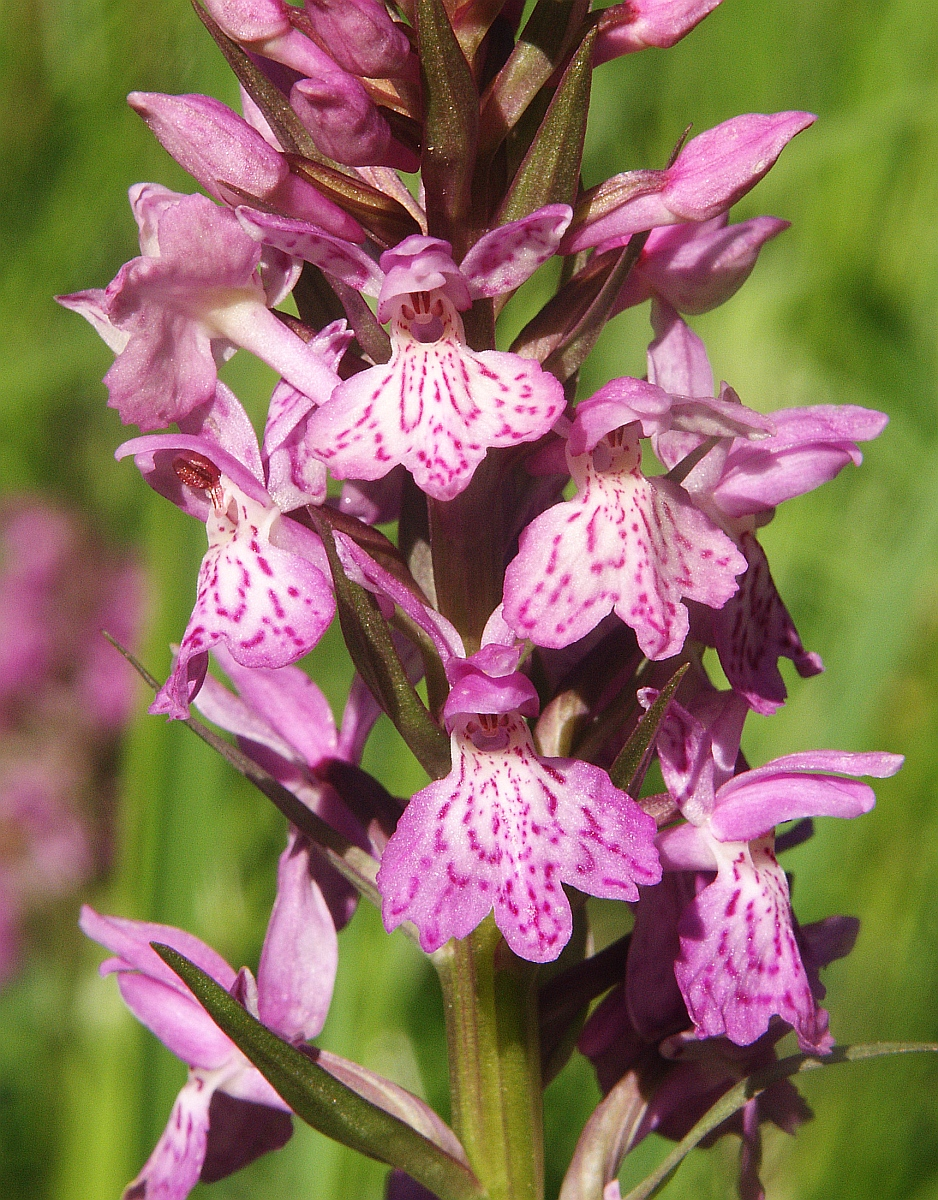
Dactylorhiza × braunii

Plants of the World Online accepts the following inter-specific hybrids.

Note : nothosubspecies = a hybrid subspecies; nothovarietas = a hybrid variety.

- Dactylorhiza × abantiana H.Baumann & Künkele (D. iberica × D. majalis subsp. nieschalkiorum) – Turkey
- Dactylorhiza × altobracensis (H.J.Coste & Soulié) Soó (D. maculata × D. sambucina) – Austria, France, and Italy
- Dactylorhiza × alutiiqorum (A.Baum & H.Baum) J.M.H.Shaw (D. aristata × D. viridis) – Aleutian Islands
- Dactylorhiza × aschersoniana (Hausskn.) Borsos & Soó (D. incarnata × D. majalis) – W. & C. Europe)
  - Dactylorhiza × aschersoniana nothosubsp. aschersoniana (D. incarnata subsp. incarnata × D. majalis subsp. majalis) – W. & C. Europe
  - Dactylorhiza × aschersoniana nothosubsp. ishorica (Aver.) Eccarius (D. incarnata × D. majalis subsp. baltica) – northwestern European Russia
  - Dactylorhiza × aschersoniana nothovar. mulignensis (Gsell) Kümpel (D. incarnata subsp. pulchella × D. majalis subsp. majalis) – Germany and Switzerland
  - Dactylorhiza × aschersoniana nothosubsp. predaensis (Gsell) Oddone (D. incarnata subsp. cruenta × D. majalis subsp. majalis) – Austria and Switzerland
  - Dactylorhiza × aschersoniana nothosubsp. templinensis (Potucek) H.Kretzschmar (D. incarnata subsp. ochroleuca × D. majalis) – Germany
- Dactylorhiza × baicalica Aver. (D. incarnata subsp. cruenta × D. salina) – Buryatia
- Dactylorhiza × balabaniana H.Baumann (D. iberica × D. urvilleana) – Lebanon and Turkey
- Dactylorhiza × bayburtiana H.Baumann (D. euxina × D. umbrosa) – Turkey
- Dactylorhiza × beckeriana (Höppner) Soó (D. incarnata × D. maculata × D. majalis) – Germany
- Dactylorhiza × boluiana H.Baumann (D. nieschalkiorum × D. saccifera) – Turkey
- Dactylorhiza × braunii (Halácsy) Borsos & Soó (D. maculata × D. majalis) – Spain to central Europe and Ukraine
  - Dactylorhiza × braunii nothosubsp. braunii (D. maculata subsp. fuchsii × D. majalis subsp. majalis) – Spain to central Europe and Ukraine
  - Dactylorhiza × braunii nothosubsp. lilacina (F.Proch.) Holub (D. maculata subsp. fuchsii × D. majalis subsp. turfosa) – Czechoslovakia
- Dactylorhiza × conigera (Norman) B.Bock (D. maculata × D. viridis) – France, Great Britain, and Iceland
- Dactylorhiza × daunia W.Rossi, Ard., Cianchi, Piemont. & Bullini (D. maculata subsp. saccifera × D. majalis subsp. pindica) – Greece and Italy
- Dactylorhiza × delamainii (G.Keller ex T.Stephenson) Soó (D. elata × D. maculata) – France
- Dactylorhiza × drucei (A.Camus) Eccarius (D. majalis × D. viridis) – Austria, Czechoslovakia, France, Great Britain, and Iceland
- Dactylorhiza × dubreuilhii (G.Keller & Jeanj.) Soó (D. elata × D. incarnata) – France and Spain
- Dactylorhiza × dufftiana (M.Schulze) Soó (D. majalis subsp. majalis × D. majalis subsp. lapponica) – France to middle Europe and the Baltic states
- Dactylorhiza × erdingeri (A.Kern.) B.Bock (D. sambucina × D. viridis) – Austria, Czechoslovakia, and France
- Dactylorhiza × flixensis (Gsell) Soó (D. incarnata subsp. pulchella × D. majalis subsp. lapponica) – Switzerland
- Dactylorhiza × fourkensis B.Willing & E.Willing (D. majalis subsp. pindica × D. sambucina) – Greece
- Dactylorhiza × gabretana (A.Fuchs) Soó (D. incarnata × D. maculata × D. sambucina) – Germany
- Dactylorhiza × grandis (Druce) P.F.Hunt (D. maculata × D. majalis) – Benelux, France, Great Britain, and Sweden
- Dactylorhiza × guilhotii (E.G.Camus) B.Bock (D. incarnata × D. viridis) – France and Great Britain
- Dactylorhiza × guillaumeae Chr.Bernard (D. incarnata × D. sambucina) – France and Italy
- Dactylorhiza × gustavssonii (D. iberica × D. maculata subsp. saccifera) – Greece and Turkey
- Dactylorhiza × hallii (Druce) Soó – Belgium, France, Great Britain, Netherlands (Unplaced)
- Dactylorhiza × influenza (Sennholz) Soó (D. maculata subsp. fuchsii × D. sambucina) Austria, Italy
- Dactylorhiza × katarana H.Baumann (D. maculata subsp. saccifera × D. majalis subsp. kalopissii) – Greece
- Dactylorhiza × kerneriorum (Soó) Soó (D. fuchsii × D. incarnata) – western and central Europe and East European Russia
  - Dactylorhiza × kerneriorum nothosubsp. ampolai (Hautz.) Eccarius (D. incarnata subsp. cruenta × D. maculata subsp. fuchsii) – Austria, France, Ireland, Italy, and Switzerland
  - Dactylorhiza × kerneriorum nothosubsp. kerneriorum (D. incarnata subsp. incarnata × D. maculata subsp. fuchsii) – Spain to Poland, Romania, and eastern European Russia
  - Dactylorhiza × kerneriorum nothosubsp. lillsundica (D. incarnata subsp. ochroleuca × D. maculata subsp. fuchsii) – Austria, France, and Sweden
- Dactylorhiza × latirella (P.M.Hall) Soó (D. incarnata × D. purpurella) – Germany, Great Britain, and Ireland
- Dactylorhiza × lehmannii (Klinge) Soó (D. incarnata × D. russowii) – Germany
- Dactylorhiza × megapolitana (Bisse) Soó (D. maculata subsp. fuchsii × D. russowii) – Germany
- Dactylorhiza × metsowonensis B.Baumann & H.Baumann (D. majalis subsp. kalopissii × D. sambucina – Greece
- Dactylorhiza × mixta (Asch. & Graebn.) B.Bock (D. maculata subsp. fuchsii × D. viridis) – Austria, Italy, France, Great Britain, Ireland, and Norway
- Dactylorhiza × ornonensis (G.Keller & Jeanj.) Soó (D. elata × D. incarnata × D. maculata) – France
- Dactylorhiza × perez-chiscanoi F.M.Vázquez (D. elata × D. majalis subsp. lapponica) – Spain
- Dactylorhiza × rizeana Renz & Taubenheim (D. euxina × D. urvilleana) – Turkey
- Dactylorhiza × rombucina (D. romana × D. sambucina) – Italy
- Dactylorhiza × ruppertii (M.Schulze) Borsos & Soó (D. majalis × D. sambucina) – Austria, Czechoslovakia, France, Germany, and Switzerland
- Dactylorhiza × salteri (T.Stephenson) Soó (D. majalis subsp. praetermissa × D. purpurella) – Great Britain
- Dactylorhiza × senayi (Alleiz.) Soó (D. maculata × D. majalis) – Spain to Czechoslovakia and Sweden
- Dactylorhiza × serbica (H.Fleischm.) Soó (D. incarnata × D. majalis subsp. saccifera) – Italy and Yugoslavia
- Dactylorhiza × sivasiana E.Baumann & Künkele ex Renz & Taubenheim (D. incarnata subsp. cilicica × D. urvilleana) – Turkey
- Dactylorhiza × szaboiana (Soó) Soó (D. maculata subsp. maculata × D. majalis subsp. cordigera) – Romania
- Dactylorhiza × vallis-peenae Kümpel (D. majalis × D. russowii) – Germany
- Dactylorhiza × venusta (T.Stephenson & T.A.Stephenson) Soó (D. maculata subsp. fuchsii × D. purpurella) – Great Britain and Ireland
- Dactylorhiza × viridella (Hesl.-Harr.) Oddone (D. purpurella × D. viridis) – Great Britain and Ireland
- Dactylorhiza × vitosana H.Baumann (D. maculata subsp. saccifera × D. sambucina) – Bulgaria
- Dactylorhiza × vogtiana H.Baumann (D. iberica × D. incarnata) – Turkey

== Distribution and habitat ==
These terrestrial orchids grow in basic soils in wet meadows, bogs, heathland and in areas sparsely populated by trees. They are distributed throughout the subarctic and temperate northern hemisphere. It is found across much of Europe, North Africa and Asia from Portugal and Iceland to Taiwan and Kamchatka, including Russia, Japan, China, Central Asia, the Middle East, Ukraine, Scandinavia, Germany, Poland, Italy, France, the United Kingdom, etc. Inclusion of the widespread frog orchid, often called Coeloglossum viride, into Dactylorhiza as per some recent classifications, expands the genus distribution to include Canada and much of the United States.

== Bibliography ==
- Box, M.S.; Bateman, R.M.; Glover, B. & Rudall, P. (2008). "Floral ontogenetic evidence of repeated speciation via paedomorphosis in subtribe Orchidinae (Orchidaceae)". Botanical Journal of the Linnean Society. 157 (3): 429–454. Bibcode:2008BJLS..157..429B. doi:10.1111/j.1095-8339.2008.00794.x.
- De Hert, Koen; Jacquemyn, Hans; Van Glabeke, Sabine; Roldán-Ruiz, Isabel; Vandepitte, Katrien; Leus, Leen & Honnay, Olivier (2011). "Reproductive isolation and hybridization in sympatric populations of three Dactylorhiza species (Orchidaceae) with different ploidy levels". Annals of Botany. 109 (4): 709–720. doi:10.1093/aob/mcr305. PMC 3286275. PMID 22186278.
- De Hert, Koen; Jacquemyn, Hans; Van Glabeke, Sabine; Roldán-Ruiz, Isabel; Vandepitte, Katrien; Leus, Leen & Honnay, Olivier (2011). "Patterns of hybridization between diploid and derived allotetraploid species of Dactylorhiza (Orchidaceae) co-occurring in Belgium". American Journal of Botany. 98 (6): 946–955. Bibcode:2011AmJB...98..946D. doi:10.3732/ajb.1000367. PMID 21653507.
- Hedrén, Mikael; Nordström, Sofie & Bateman, Richard M. (2011). "Plastid and nuclear DNA marker data support the recognition of four tetraploid marsh orchids (Dactylorhiza majalis s.l., Orchidaceae) in Britain and Ireland, but require their recircumscription". Biological Journal of the Linnean Society. 104 (1): 107–128. doi:10.1111/j.1095-8312.2011.01708.x.
- Hedrén, Mikael; Nordström, Sofie & Ståhlberg, David (2012). "Geographical variation and systematics of the tetraploid marsh orchid Dactylorhiza majalis subsp. sphagnicola (Orchidaceae) and closely related taxa". Botanical Journal of the Linnean Society. 168 (2): 174–193. doi:10.1111/j.1095-8339.2011.01198.x.
- Inda, Luis A.; Pimentel, Manuel & Chase, Mark W. (2010). "Chalcone synthase variation and phylogenetic relationships in Dactylorhiza (Orchidaceae)". Botanical Journal of the Linnean Society. 163 (2): 155–165. doi:10.1111/j.1095-8339.2010.01055.x.
- Paun, Ovidiu; Bateman, Richard M.; Fay, Michael F.; Hedrén, Mikael; Civeyrel, Laure & Chase, Mark W. (2010). "Stable epigenetic effects impact adaptation in allopolyploid orchids (Dactylorhiza: Orchidaceae)". Molecular Biology and Evolution. 27 (11): 2465–2473. doi:10.1093/molbev/msq150. PMC 2955735. PMID 20551043.
- Paun, Ovidiu; Bateman, Richard M.; Fay, Michael F.; Luna, Javier A.; Moat, Justin; Hedrén, Mikael & Chase, Mark W. (2011). "Altered gene expression and ecological divergence in sibling allopolyploids of Dactylorhiza (Orchidaceae)". BMC Evolutionary Biology. 11 (1): 113. Bibcode:2011BMCEE..11..113P. doi:10.1186/1471-2148-11-113. PMC 3112086. PMID 21521507.
- Paun, Ovidiu; Luna, Javier A.; Fay, Michael F.; Bateman, Richard M. & Chase, Mark W. (2010). "Genomic responses drive adaptation in allotetraploid species of Dactylorhiza (Orchidaceae; Orchidinae)". In Seberg, Ole; Petersen, Gitte; Barfod, Anders & Davis, Jerrold I. (eds.). Diversity, Phylogeny, and Evolution in the Monocotyledons: Proceedings of the Fourth International Conference on the Comparative Biology of the Monocotyledons and the Fifth International Symposium on Grass Systematics and Evolution. pp. 169–192.
- Ståhlberg, David & Hedrén, Mikael (2010). "Evolutionary history of the Dactylorhiza maculata polyploid complex (Orchidaceae)". Biological Journal of the Linnean Society. 101 (3): 503–525. doi:10.1111/j.1095-8312.2010.01505.x.
- Wolfe, Thomas M; Balao, Francisco; Trucchi, Emiliano; Bachmann, Gert; Gu, Wenjia; Baar, Juliane; Hedren, Mikael; Weckwerth, Wolfram; Leitch, Andrew R & Paun, Ovidiu (2023). "Recurrent allopolyploidizations diversify ecophysiological traits in marsh orchids ( Dactylorhiza majalis s.l.)". Molecular Ecology. 32 (17): 4777–4790. Bibcode:2023MolEc..32.4777W. bioRxiv 10.1101/2021.08.28.458039. doi:10.1111/mec.17070. hdl:11566/328196.
