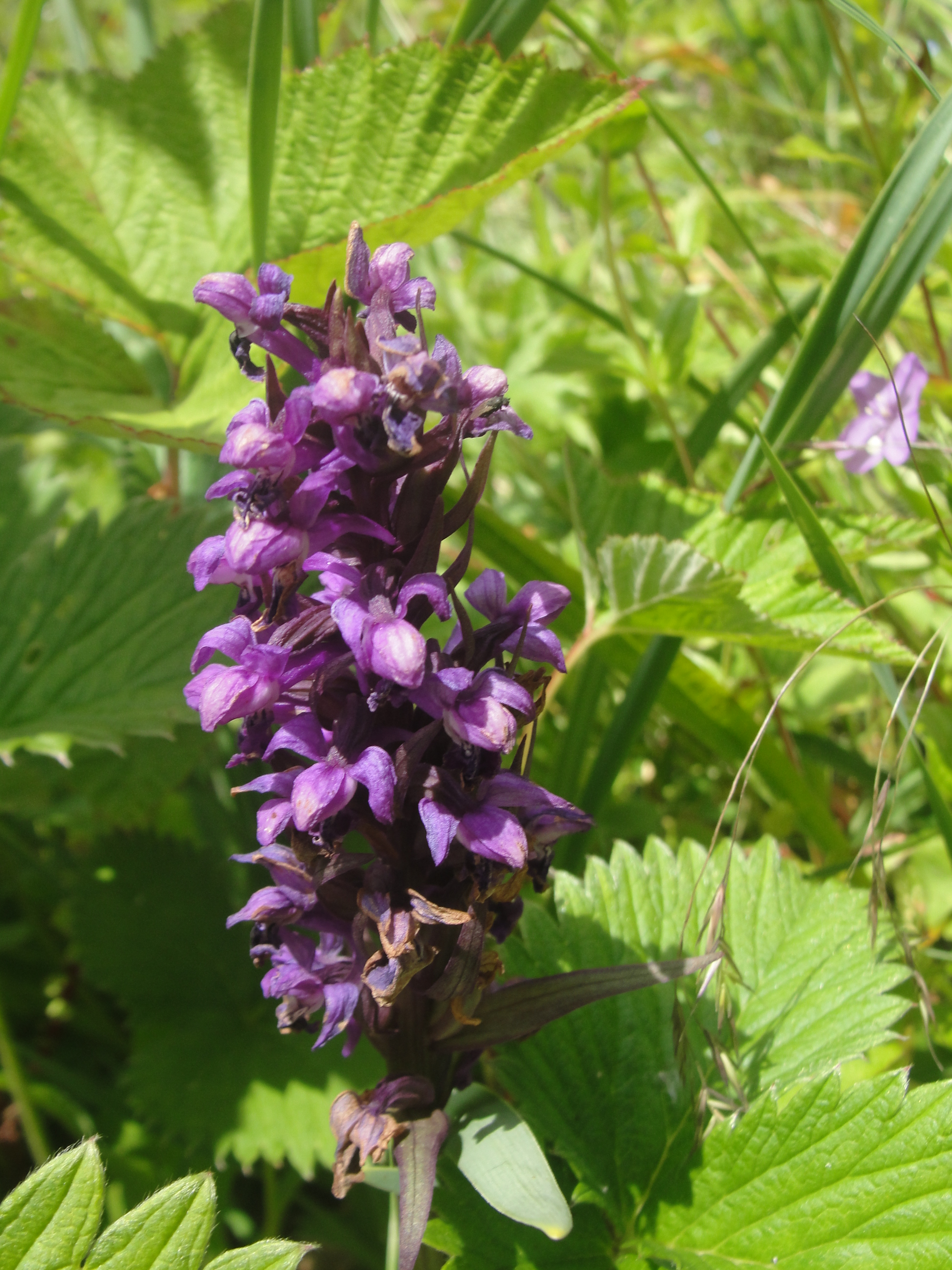

Scientific classification
- Kingdom: Plantae
- Clade: Tracheophytes
- Clade: Angiosperms
- Clade: Monocots
- Order: Asparagales
- Family: Orchidaceae
- Subfamily: Orchidoideae
- Genus: Dactylorhiza
- Species: D. hatagirea

Binomial name
- Dactylorhiza hatagirea (D.Don) Soó

= Dactylorhiza hatagirea =

Species of orchid

Dactylorhiza hatagirea is a species of orchid generally found growing from Mongolia to the Himalayas.

== Habitat and description ==
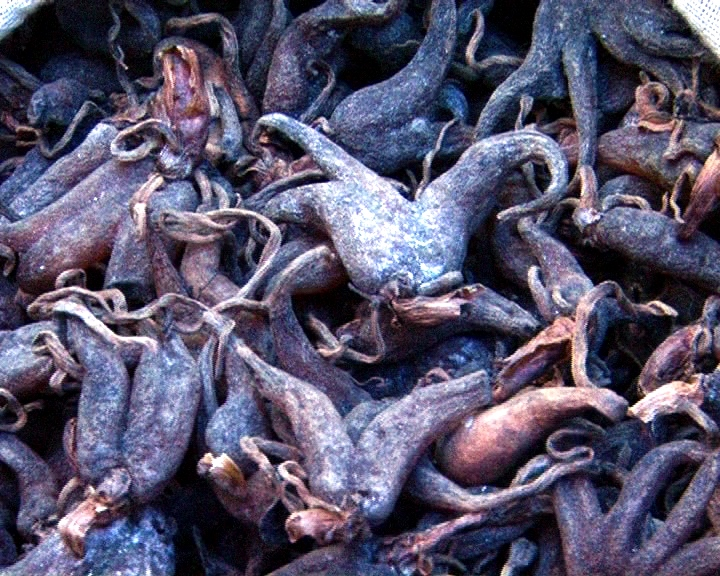
The tubers

The native range of Dactylorhiza hatagirea is from Mongolia to the Himalayas. It flowers in June–July. Its roots are tuberous, divided into 2 or 3 lobes.

== Conservation status ==
Dactylorhiza hatagirea is endemic to the Hindu- Kush Himalaya. It is categorized as endangered in CAMP Pokhara (2001) conservation list, and strictly banned for collection, utilization and sale (strictly protected species list I GoN, 2001, 2005), and listed in appendix II for control trading (CITES – 1974).
