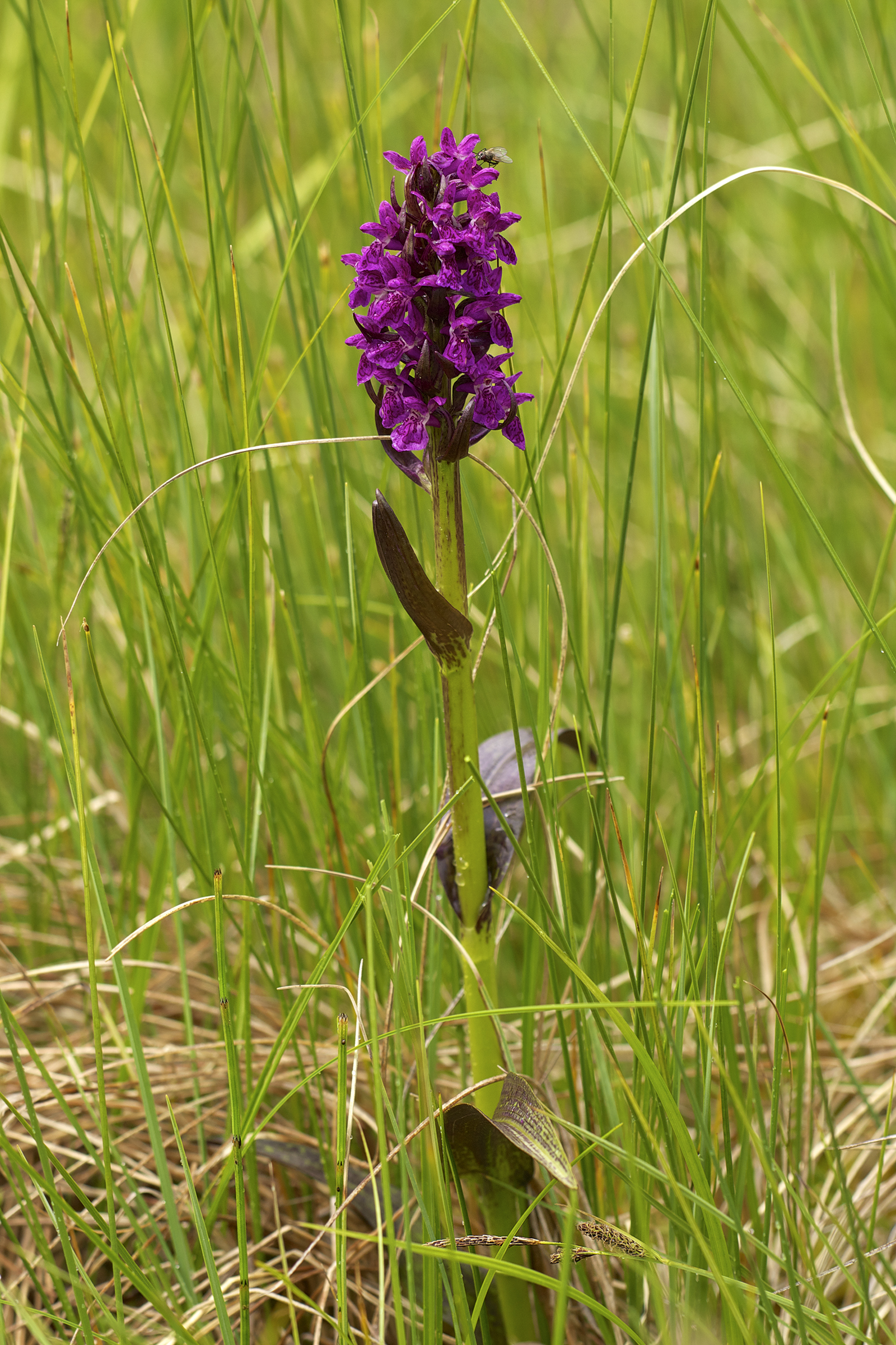

Scientific classification
- Kingdom: Plantae
- Clade: Tracheophytes
- Clade: Angiosperms
- Clade: Monocots
- Order: Asparagales
- Family: Orchidaceae
- Subfamily: Orchidoideae
- Genus: Dactylorhiza
- Species: D. incarnata
- Subspecies: D. i. subsp. cruenta

Trinomial name
- Dactylorhiza incarnata subsp. cruenta (O.F.Müll.) P.D.Sell

= Dactylorhiza incarnata subsp. cruenta =

Flecked marsh orchid

Subspecies of orchid

Dactylorhiza incarnata subsp. cruenta, synonym Dactylorhiza cruenta, the flecked marsh orchid, is a Palearctic orchid, native from Britain east to Siberia and south to Turkey and Xinjiang.
