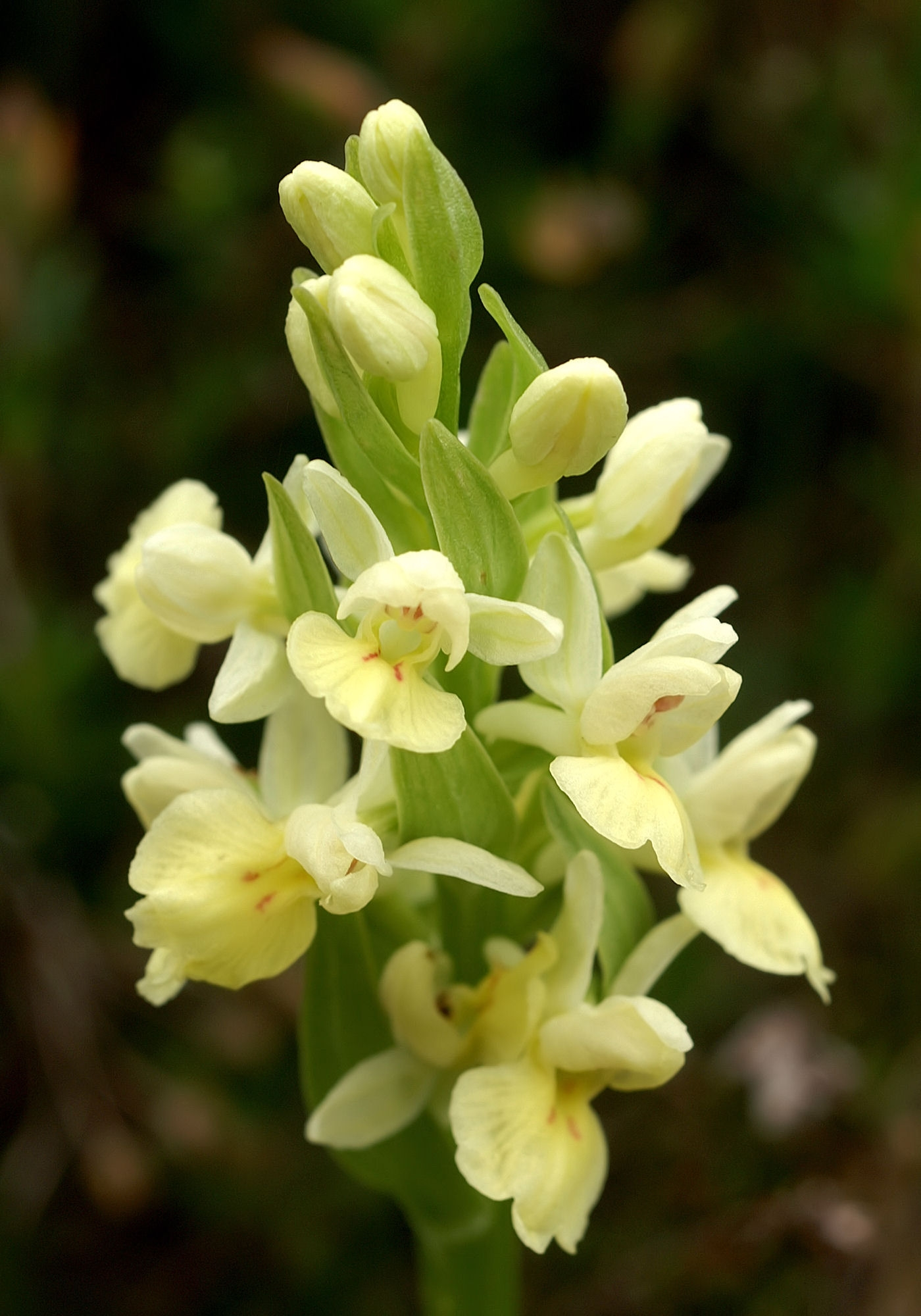

Scientific classification
- Kingdom: Plantae
- Clade: Tracheophytes
- Clade: Angiosperms
- Clade: Monocots
- Order: Asparagales
- Family: Orchidaceae
- Subfamily: Orchidoideae
- Genus: Dactylorhiza
- Species: D. insularis

Binomial name
- Dactylorhiza insularis (Sommier ex Martelli) Landwehr (1969)

Synonyms
- Orchis insularis Sommier; Orchis sambucina var. insularis (Sommier) Fiori in A.Fiori & al.; Orchis romana var. insularis (Sommier) E.G.Camus in E.G.Camus, P.Bergon & A.A.Camus; Orchis sambucina subsp. insularis (Sommier) Briq.; Dactylorhiza iberica subsp. insularis (Sommier) Soó; Dactylorhiza sambucina subsp. insularis (Sommier) Soó; Orchis pseudosambucina subsp. castellana Rivas Goday; Orchis sulphurea subsp. castellana (Rivas Goday) Rivas Goday; Dactylorhiza romana subsp. bartonii Huxley & P.F.Hunt; Dactylorhiza bartonii (Huxley & P.F.Hunt) Aver.; Dactylorhiza insularis var. bartonii (Huxley & P.F.Hunt) D.Rivera & Lopez Velez; Dactylorhiza insularis subsp. castellana (Rivas Goday) D.Rivera & Lopez Velez; Dactylorhiza insularis f. bartonii (Huxley & P.F.Hunt) Gathoye & D.Tyteca; Dactylorhiza insularis f. castellana (Rivas Goday) Bernardos

= Dactylorhiza insularis =

Species of flowering plant in the orchid family

Dactylorhiza insularis is a species of terrestrial (ground-dwelling) plant, in the genus Dactylorhiza in the orchid family (Orchidaceae). It is native to the western Mediterranean region: Spain, Portugal, Morocco, France (including Corsica), and Italy (Sardinia, Emilia-Romagna, Toscana).
