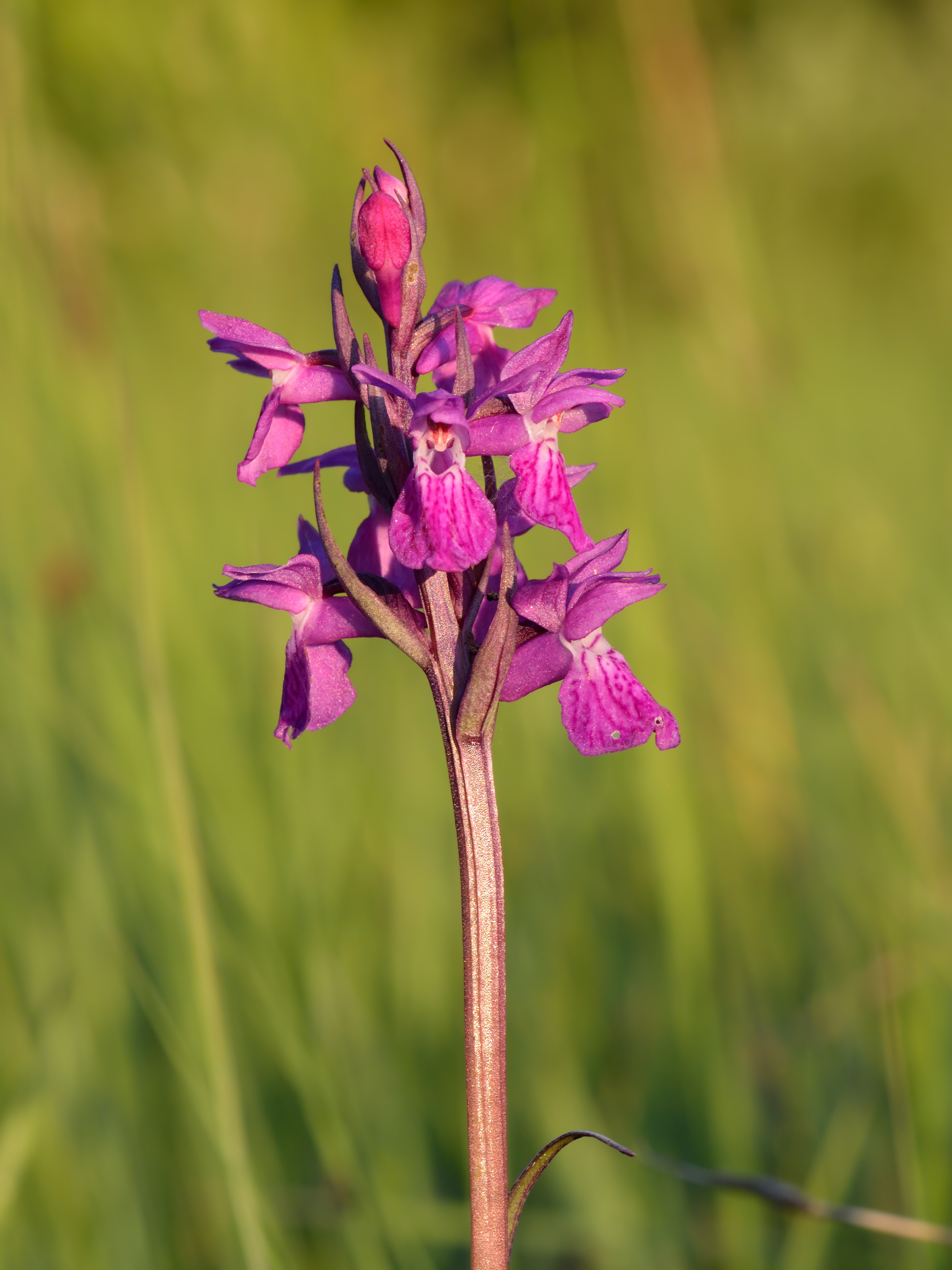

Scientific classification
- Kingdom: Plantae
- Clade: Tracheophytes
- Clade: Angiosperms
- Clade: Monocots
- Order: Asparagales
- Family: Orchidaceae
- Subfamily: Orchidoideae
- Genus: Dactylorhiza
- Species: D. russowii

Binomial name
- Dactylorhiza russowii (Klinge) Holub

= Dactylorhiza russowii =

Species of flowering plant

Dactylorhiza russowii is a species of Dactylorhiza.

It is native to the areas from East Germany to Central Russia.
