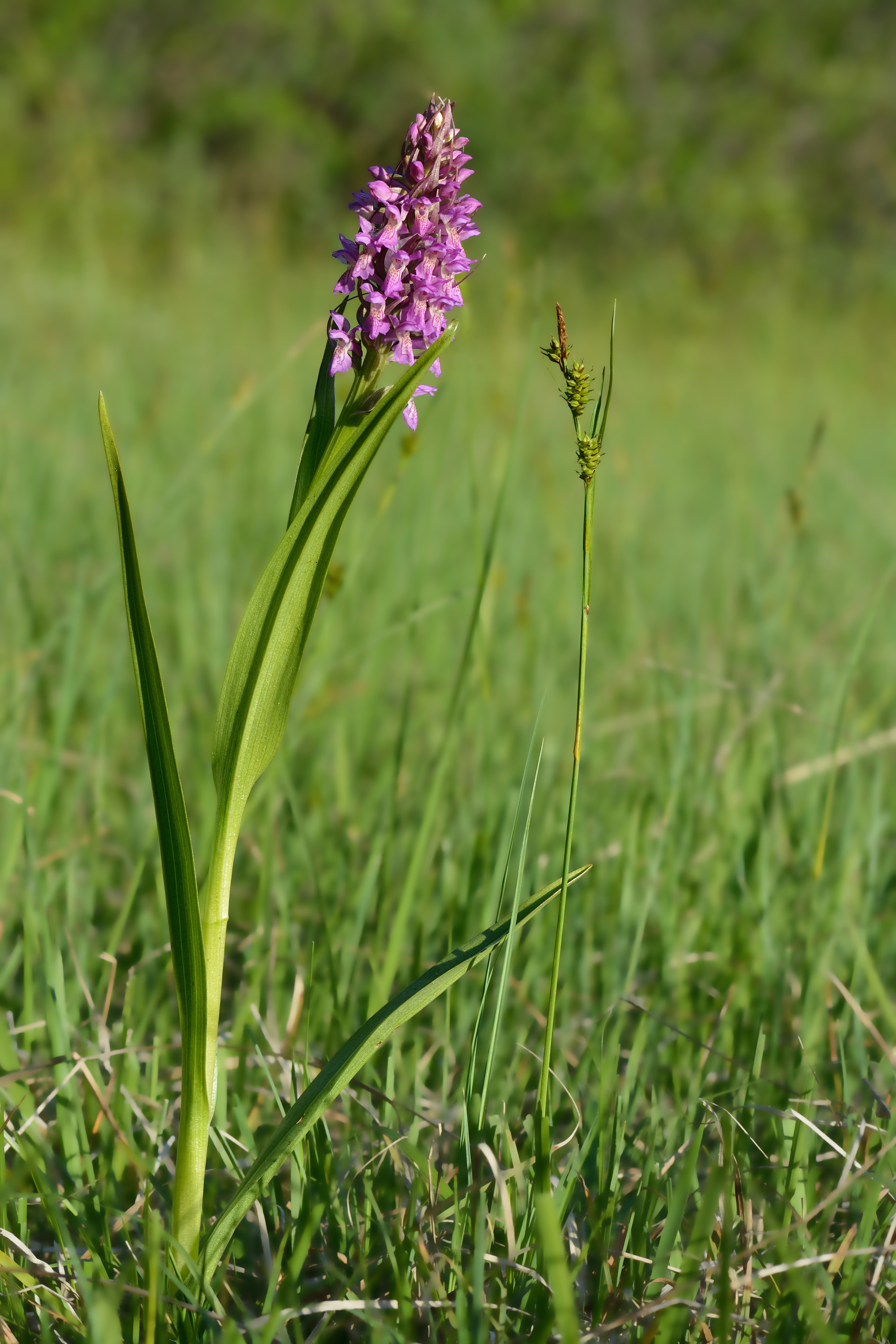
- Dactylorhiza incarnata habitus

Scientific classification
- Kingdom: Plantae
- Clade: Tracheophytes
- Clade: Angiosperms
- Clade: Monocots
- Order: Asparagales
- Family: Orchidaceae
- Subfamily: Orchidoideae
- Genus: Dactylorhiza
- Species: D. incarnata

Binomial name
- Dactylorhiza incarnata (L.) Soó

Synonyms
- List: Orchis incarnata L. (1755) (Basionym); Dactylorchis incarnata (L.) Verm.; Dactylorhiza coccinea (Pugsley) Aver.; Orchis cruenta O.F.Müll. in G.C.Oeder; Dactylorchis cruenta (O.F.Müll.) Verm.; Dactylorhiza cruenta (O.F.Müll.) Soó; Orchis haematodes Rchb.; Orchis matodes Rchb.f. in H.G.L.Reichenbach; Orchis cruentiformis Neuman; Dactylorhiza haematodes (Rchb.) G.H.Loos; Dactylorhiza gemmana (Pugsley) Aver.; Orchis comosa Scop.; Orchis mixta Retz.; Orchis divaricata Rich. ex Loisel.; Orchis fistulata Stokes; Orchis strictiflora Opiz; Orchis angustifolia Wimm. & Grab.; Orchis angustifolia Loisel. ex Rchb.; Orchis lanceata A.Dietr.; Orchis tharandina Rchb.f. in H.G.L.Reichenbach; Orchis strictifolia Opiz; Orchis extensa (Hartm.) Pritz.; Orchis condensa Schur; Orchis altaica (Rchb.f.) Soó; Dactylorhiza latifolia (L.) Soó; Dactylorchis latifolia (L.) Rothm.; Dactylorhiza strictifolia (Opiz) Rauschert ex Hudziok; Dactylorhiza comosa (Scop.) P.D.Sell in P.D.Sell & G.Murrell; Dactylorhiza intermedia (Serg.) Kulikov & E.G.Philippov; Dactylorhiza ochroleuca (Wüstnei ex Boll) Holub; Dactylorhiza pulchella (Druce) Aver.; Dactylorhiza serotina (Hausskn.) G.H.Loos

= Dactylorhiza incarnata =

Early marsh-orchid

Species of flowering plant in the orchid family

Dactylorhiza incarnata, the early marsh-orchid, is a perennial, temperate-climate species of orchid generally found growing in wet meadows, and generally on base-rich soils, up to about 2100m asl. The species occurs widely in Europe and Asia from Portugal and Ireland east to Siberia and Xinjiang.

There are several subspecies and also hybrids, rendering the identification of this species more difficult, but typically, the flowering spike is robust with a hollow stem, 25–60 cm (9.8–24 in) tall, and bearing up to 50 flowers. Plants grow to a height of from 15 to 70 cm (5.9 to 28 in). The 4–7 erect yellowish-green leaves are hooded at the tip. The inflorescence is 4–12 cm (1.6–4.7 in) long, with up to 50 blooms. The labellum appears long and narrow, since its sides are strongly reflexed (folded back). The tip is shallowly three-lobed. The flower is often flesh-coloured (the meaning of incarnata) and the labellum normally has loop-shaped markings.

The flowering period is from May to mid-July, dependent on latitude and subspecies.

== Subspecies ==
Many names have been proposed for subspecies, varieties and forms within the species. As of December 2023, Plants of the World Online accepted the following subspecies:

- Dactylorhiza incarnata subsp. cilicica (Klinge) H.Sund. – Turkey to Siberia and west Himalaya
- Dactylorhiza incarnata subsp. coccinea (Pugsley) Soó – north and west Europe
- Dactylorhiza incarnata subsp. cruenta (O.F.Müll.) P.D.Sell – Europe (including Britain) to Mongolia
- Dactylorhiza incarnata subsp. cungsii Kreutz – Luxembourg
- Dactylorhiza incarnata subsp. gemmana (Pugsley) P.D.Sell – Germany, Great Britain, Ireland, Netherlands
- Dactylorhiza incarnata subsp. incarnata – Europe to Siberia and Central Asia
- Dactylorhiza incarnata subsp. ochroleuca (Wüstnei ex Boll) P.F.Hunt & Summerh. – Europe

Two hybrid subspecies (nothosubspecies) are also accepted:

- Dactylorhiza incarnata nothosubsp. krylovii (Soó) ined. = D. incarnata subsp. cruenta × D. incarnata subsp. incarnata
- Dactylorhiza incarnata nothosubsp. versicolor (J.C.Schmidt ex Lüscher) Potucek = D. incarnata subsp. incarnata × D. incarnata subsp. ochroleuca

Hybrids have been reported between D. incarnata and D. maculata, D. praetermissa, D. purpurella and D. kerryensis.

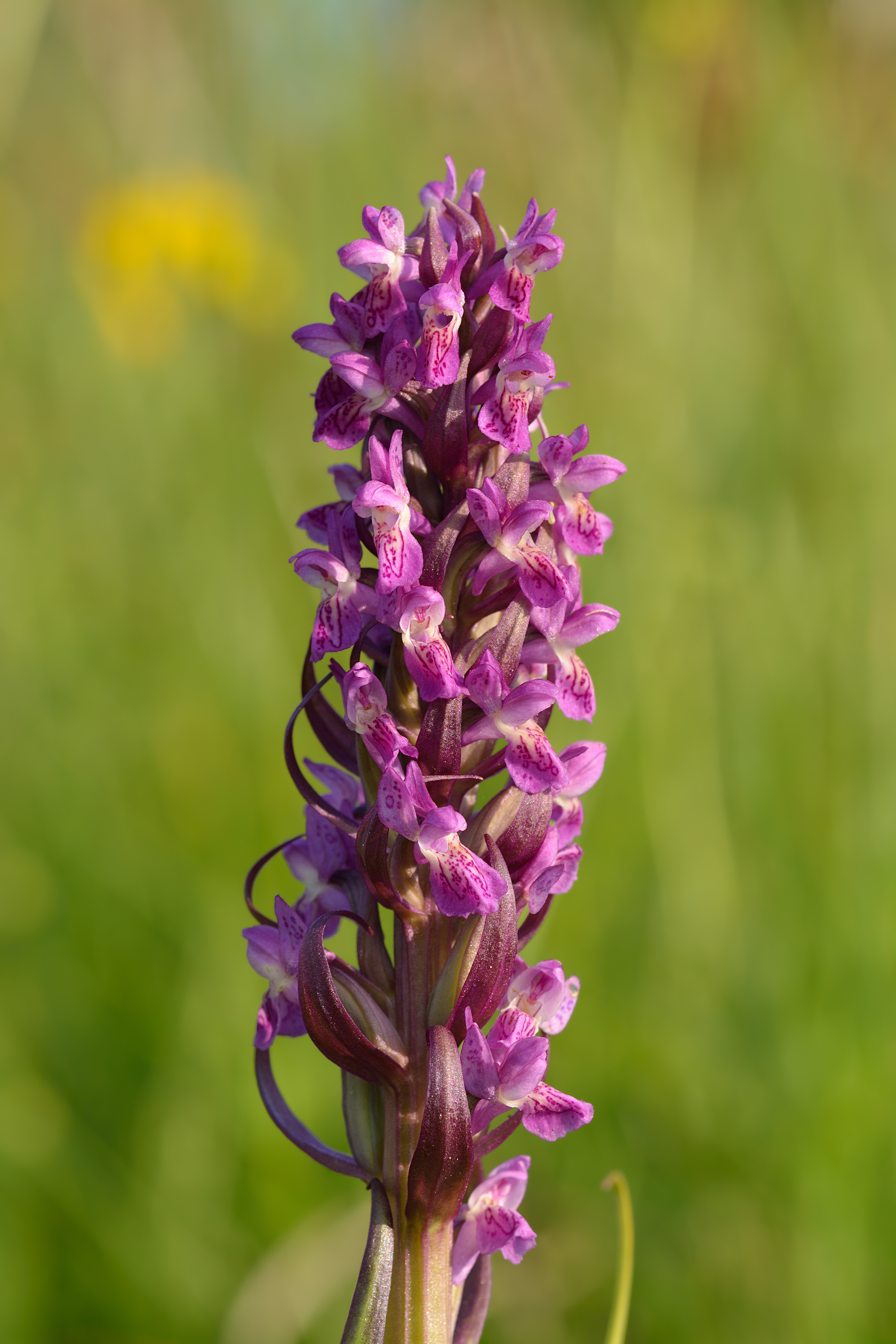
Inflorescence

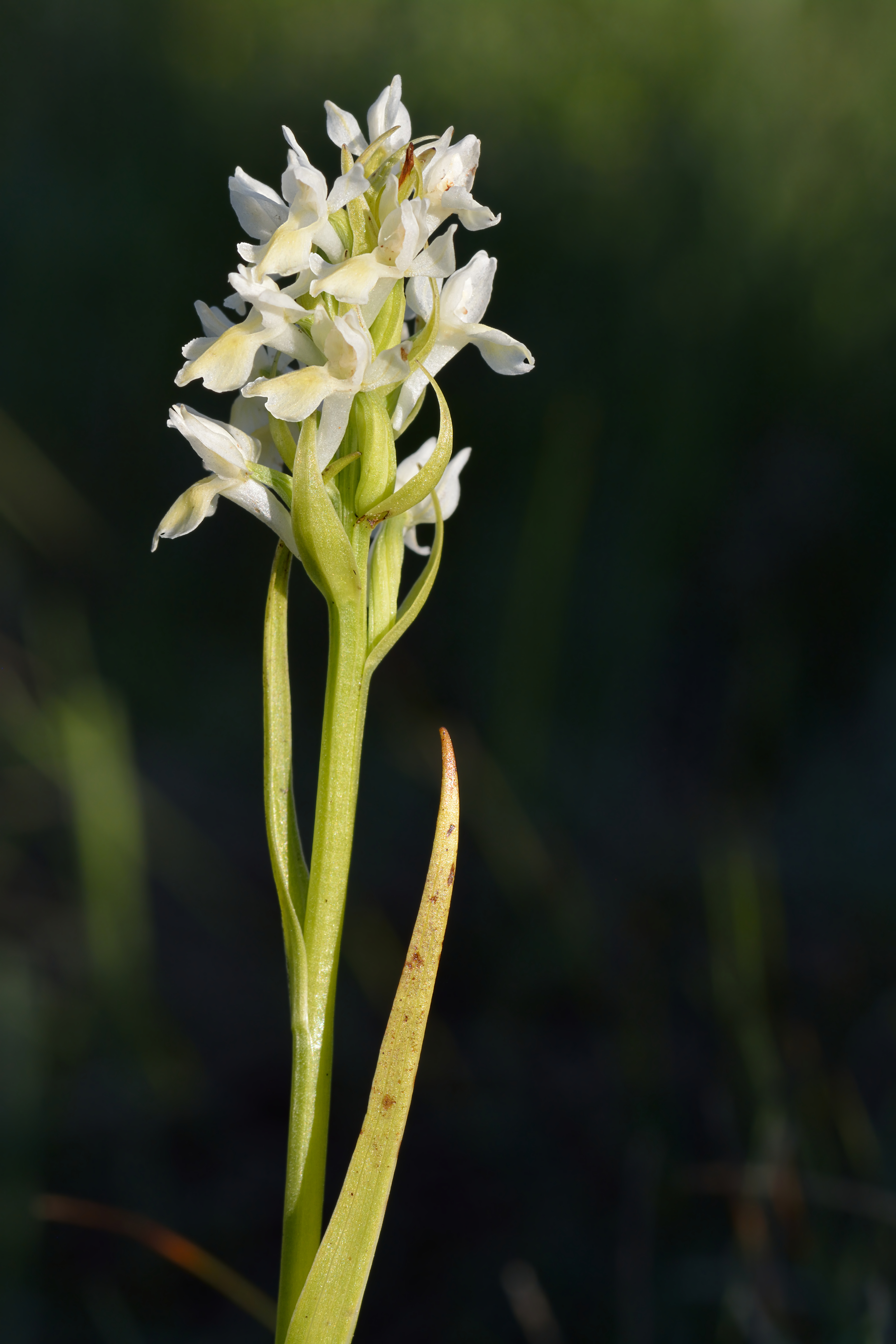
subsp. ochroleuca

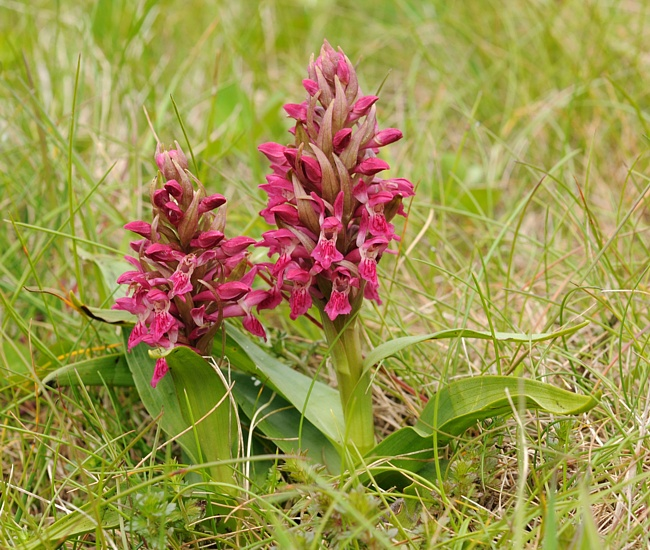
subsp. coccinea

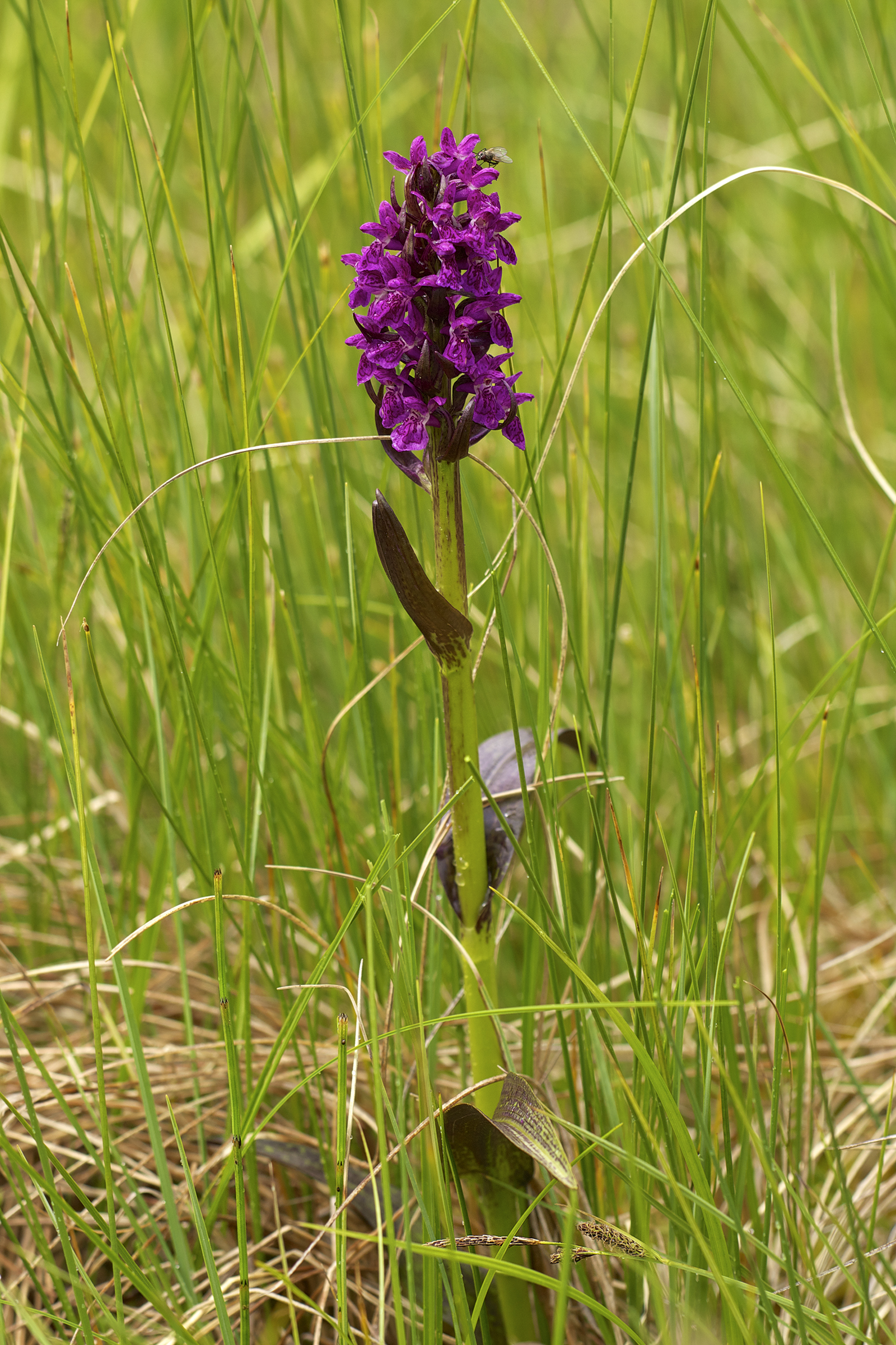
subsp. cruenta

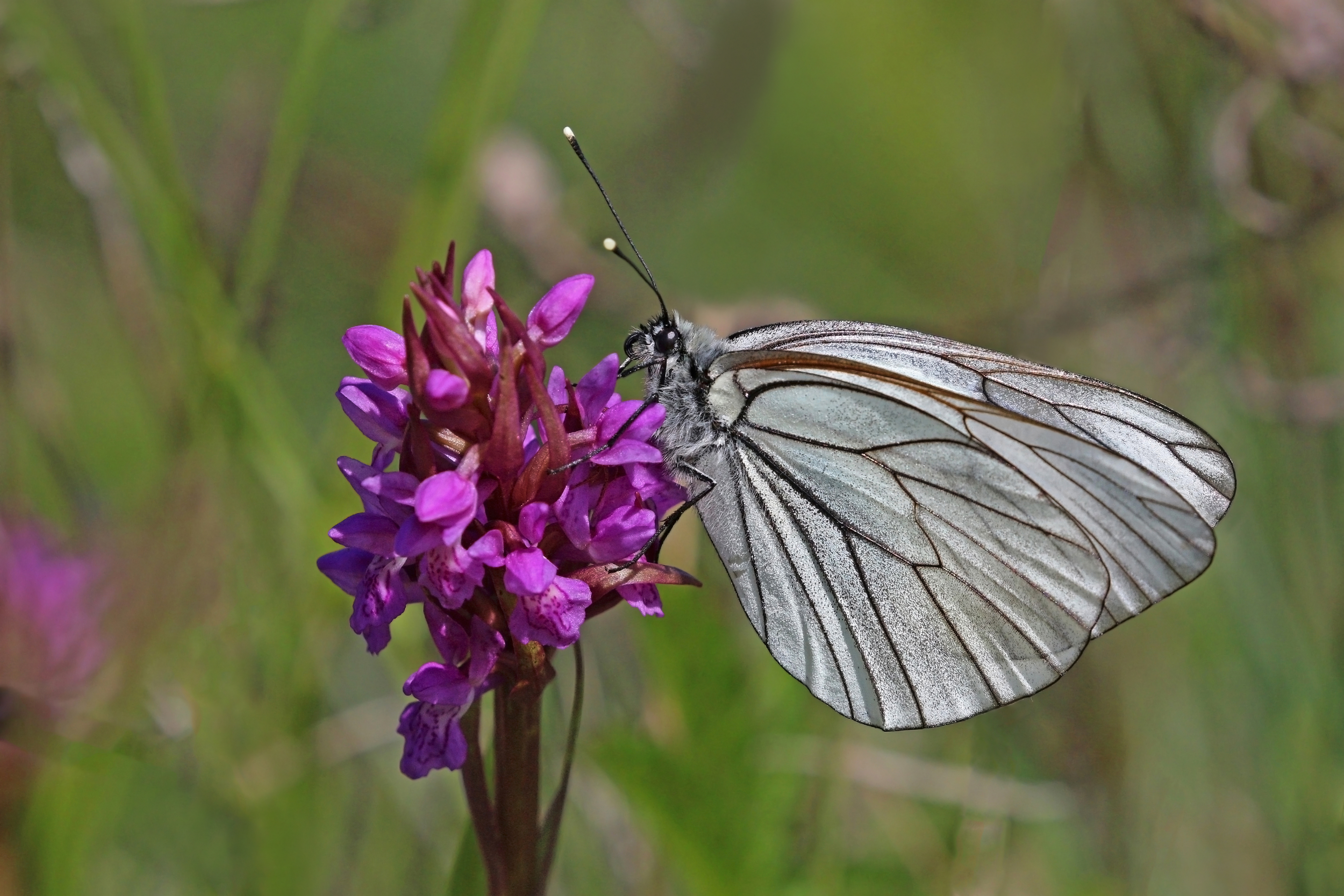
Aporia crataegi on subsp. latissima, Estonia
