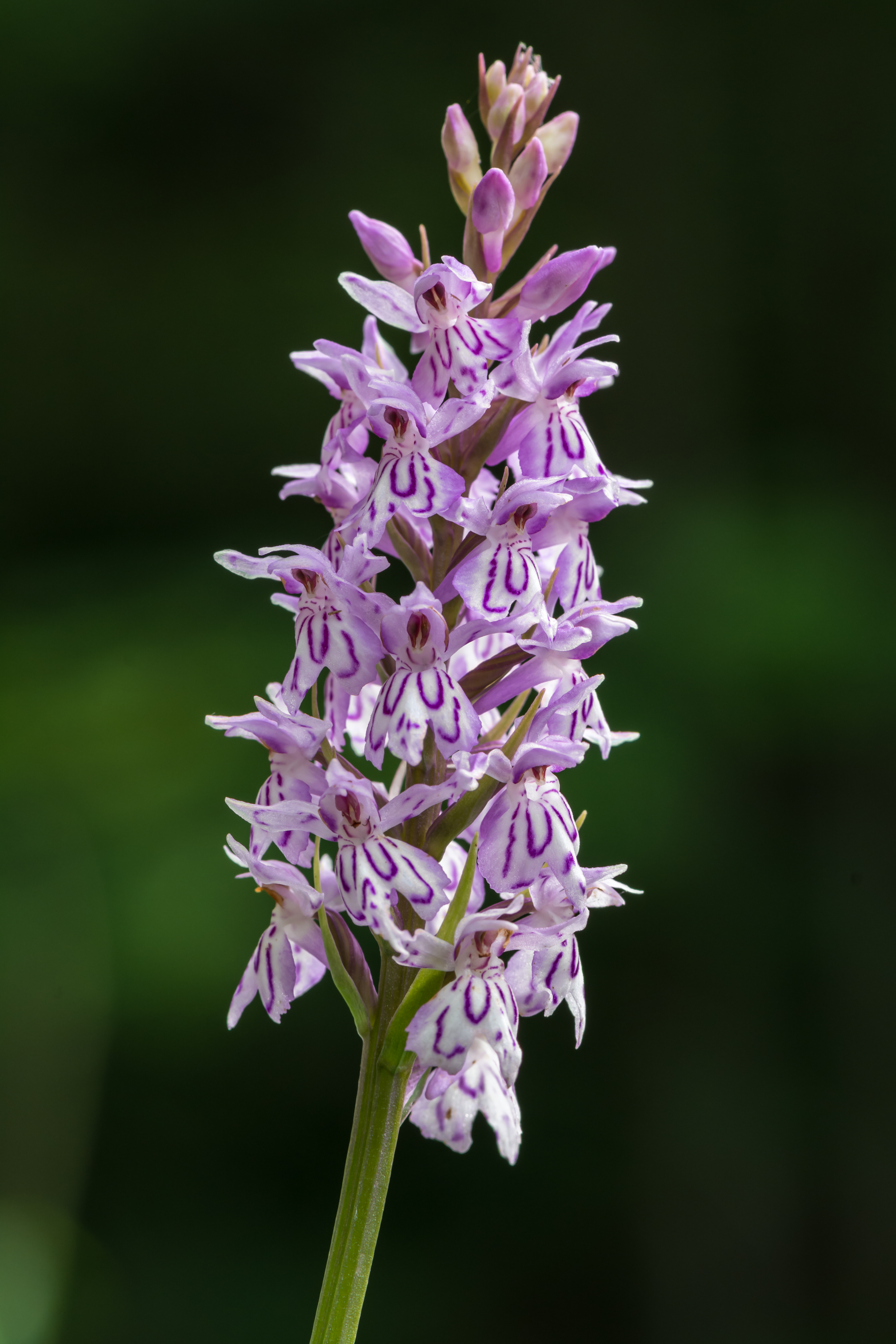

Scientific classification
- Kingdom: Plantae
- Clade: Tracheophytes
- Clade: Angiosperms
- Clade: Monocots
- Order: Asparagales
- Family: Orchidaceae
- Subfamily: Orchidoideae
- Genus: Dactylorhiza
- Species: D. fuchsii

Binomial name
- Dactylorhiza fuchsii (Druce) Soó (1962)

Synonyms
- Synonyms list: × Dactylanthera chevallieriana subsp. somersetensis (A.Camus) J.M.H.Shaw (2005); × Dactylanthera somersetensis (A.Camus) B.Bock (2012); Dactylorchis fuchsii (Druce) Verm. (1947); Dactylorchis fuchsii subsp. sooana Borsos (1959); Dactylorhiza andoeyana Perko (2007); Dactylorhiza fuchsii f. alpina Landwehr (1975); Dactylorhiza fuchsii var. alpina (Landwehr) R.M.Bateman & Denholm (1989); Dactylorhiza fuchsii f. andoeyana (Perko) P.Delforge (2008); Dactylorhiza fuchsii var. brachystachys (E.G.Camus) Soó (1962); Dactylorhiza fuchsii var. cornubiensis (Pugsley) Soó (1962); Dactylorhiza fuchsii subsp. fuchsii; Dactylorhiza fuchsii var. hebridensis (Wilmott) R.M.Bateman & Denholm (1989); Dactylorhiza fuchsii subsp. hebridensis (Wilmott) Soó (1962); Dactylorhiza fuchsii var. longibracteata Vöth (1978); Dactylorhiza fuchsii var. magnocalcarata Landwehr (1975); Dactylorhiza fuchsii f. meyeri (Rchb.f.) P.Delforge (2011); Dactylorhiza fuchsii var. meyeri (Rchb.f.) Soó (1962); Dactylorhiza fuchsii var. okellyi (Druce) R.M.Bateman & Denholm (1989); Dactylorhiza fuchsii subsp. okellyi (Druce) Soó (1962); Dactylorhiza fuchsii var. psychrophila (Schltr.) B.Bock (2012); Dactylorhiza fuchsii var. psychrophila (Schltr.) Soó (1962); Dactylorhiza fuchsii subsp. psychrophila (Schltr.) Holub (1964); Dactylorhiza fuchsii subsp. punicea J.Essink, L.Essink & Kreutz (2007); Dactylorhiza fuchsii f. rhodochila (Turner Ettl.) P.Delforge (2007); Dactylorhiza fuchsii var. rhodochila Turner Ettl. (1991); Dactylorhiza fuchsii subsp. sooana (Borsos) Borsos (1961); Dactylorhiza fuchsii var. sooana (Borsos) Kreutz (2004); Dactylorhiza fuchsii var. tatrensis Borsos ex Soó (1960); Dactylorhiza fuchsii var. trilobata (Bréb.) P.D.Sell (1996); Dactylorhiza hebridensis (Wilmott) Aver (1986); Dactylorhiza longibracteata (F.W.Schmidt) Holub (1983); Dactylorhiza maculata subsp. fuchsii (Druce) Hyl (1966); Dactylorhiza maculata subsp. hebridensis (Wilmott) H.Baumann & Künkele (1988); Dactylorhiza maculata subsp. meyeri (Rchb.f.) Tournay (1967); Dactylorhiza maculata subsp. okellyi (Druce) H.Baumann & Künkele (1988); Dactylorhiza maculata var. psychrophila (Schltr.) Vöth (1980); Dactylorhiza meyeri (Rchb.f.) Aver. (1982); Dactylorhiza okellyi (Druce) Aver. (1984); Dactylorhiza psychrophila (Schltr.) Aver. (1982); × Orchiplatanthera somersetiensis A.Camus (1928); Orchis fuchsii Druce (1915) (basionym); Orchis fuchsii f. lancefolia Snarskis (1963); Orchis fuchsii f. maxima Snarskis (1963); Orchis hebridensis Wilmott (1939); Orchis longibracteata F.W.Schmidt (1795), tentatively listed as a synonym.; Orchis longibracteata Schur (1866), nom. illeg.; Orchis maculata var. brachystachys E.G.Camus (1921); Orchis maculata var. cornubiensis Pugsley (1940); Orchis maculata var. curvifolia E.G.Camus (1908); Orchis maculata var. elongata Gadeceau (1892); Orchis maculata subsp. meyeri (Rchb.f.) K.Richt. (1890); Orchis maculata var. meyeri Rchb.f. (1851); Orchis maculata f. minor Zapał. (1906); Orchis maculata var. okellyi Druce (1909); Orchis maculata f. paluster E.G.Camus (1908); Orchis maculata var. psychrophila Schltr. (1927); Orchis maculata f. recurvifolia Brenner (1911); Orchis maculata var. slandzinskii Zapał. (1906); Orchis maculata var. submontana Zapał. (1906); Orchis maculata var. triloba E.G.Camus (1908); Orchis maculata f. trilobata (Bréb.) Soó (1928); Orchis maculata var. trilobata Bréb. (1835); Orchis mascula var. triloba Bréb. (1879); Orchis okellyi (Druce) Druce (1915); × Rhizanthera somersetiensis (A.Camus) Soó (1966), not validly publ.

= Dactylorhiza fuchsii =

Species of orchid

Dactylorhiza fuchsii, the common spotted orchid, is a species of flowering plant in the orchid family Orchidaceae. It is one of Europe's most common wild orchids, and is widespread across much of Europe, with the range extending eastward into Siberia, Mongolia and Xinjiang. The species is also reportedly naturalised in the Canadian Province of Ontario.

== Description ==
Dactylorhiza fuchsii is a herbaceous perennial plant ranging from 10 to 60 centimetres (5 to 25 in) in height. The inflorescence is a dense-flowered spike, produced in June–August, that is at first conical then cylindrical. The flower colour can vary from white to pale purple with purple spots, a symmetrical pattern of dark purple loops or dots and dashes. The lip has three lobes. The bracts are usually shorter than the flower. The lip is smaller than that of the very similar Dactylorhiza maculata and has three deeper cuts. The middle lobe is more than half as large as a lateral lobe. Some colonies are highly perfumed, attractive to day-flying moths. The leaves are narrow lanceolate, keeled and often dark-spotted.

== Identification ==
It is similar to other orchids in the Dactylorhiza maculata group. D. maculata ssp. maculata is distinguished by having the lip less deeply trilobed, while D. maculata subsp. saccifera has one spur large and saccular (sac-shaped) and the bracts of the inflorescence as long as or longer than the flowers. Outside of the "maculata group", D. majalis is very similar to D. fuchsii, but is distinguished by the following characteristics: the spots of the leaves are less elongated, the bracts of the inflorescence are longer and the lower transcend the inflorescence itself; it tends to be less cylindrical (a little more 'globular'), the stem is hollow (not solid) and the leaves are slightly larger. Other similar orchids are D. incarnata and D. majalis subsp. lapponica, but these species have hollow stems and different habitat (fens and bogs).

== Distribution and habitat ==
Dactylorhiza fuchsii is a Eurosiberian species occurring over Europe from Ireland in the west eastwards to Mongolia, the Altai Mountains and across northern Asia. It is sympatric with D. maculata.

Typical habitats are, variously across the range, conifer, beech and chestnut forests, moderately wet meadows, bogs and margins of streams. The preferred substrate is supposedly calcareous although it seems not to be particularly linked to this type of substrate. In mountain, subalpine and alpine ecosystems D. fuchsii is found from 900 to 2300 m above sea level. Elsewhere it is found from sea level.

The full list of areas (World Geographical Scheme for Recording Plant Distributions) for D. fuchsii is Finland, Great Britain, Iceland, Ireland, Norway, Sweden, Austria, Belgium, Czechia, Slovakia, Germany, Hungary, Netherlands, Poland, Switzerland, Corsica, Italy, Romania, former Yugoslavia, Belarus, Baltic States, Central European Russia, East European Russia, North European Russia, South European Russia, Northwest European Russia, Ukraine, Altay, Buryatiya, Chita, Irkutsk, Krasnoyarsk, Tuva, West Siberia, Yakutiya, Xinjiang, and Mongolia.

In Italy it is found mainly in the Alps in the northern Apennines. In Britain it is widespread and is the most common orchid, occurring from alkaline marshes to chalk downland. After the bee orchid, Ophrys apifera, it is the most successful orchid coloniser of waste land.

== Ecology ==
Pollination may be by bumblebees or the longhorn beetle Alosterna tabacicolor.

Dactylorhiza fuchsii forms mycorrhizal associations with fungi in the Tulasnellaceae and Ceratobasidium groups.

== Taxonomy ==
Dactylorhiza is Ancient Greek for finger root, referring to the shape of the plant's roots. The subspecies name fuchsii honours the 16th-century German botanist Leonhart Fuchs. The English name 'common spotted' refers to the species' abundance and the spots on its leaves. The French and German common names also honour Leonhart Fuchs.

This plant belongs to a problematic group of orchids. D. fuchsii is very variable in flower colour and flower morphology, plant height and the scent of flowers. This is due to the ease of introgression (the transfer of genetic material from one sympatric species to another, only partially isolated from the first, through interspecific hybridization and repeated backcrossing to a parental species), the ability of these plants to adapt quickly and easily to habitat and different substrates and possibly other causes. As a result, a multitude of forms have been defined for this plant. The World Checklist of Kew Gardens lists over 25 varieties, of which 7 are recognized as valid.

=== Hybrids ===
Hybrids with other species of the same genus are frequent. Species include:

- Dactylorhiza majalis (Rchb.) PFHunt & Summerh.
- Dactylorhiza traunsteineri (Saut. ex Rchb.)
- Dactylorhiza incarnata (L.) Soó subsp. ochroleuca

This plant hybridizes easily with species of different genera (intergeneric hybridization). The list below shows some of these intergeneric hybrids (these hybrids are not always recognized by all botanists):

- ×Dactylodenia lawalreei P.Delforge & D.Tyteca – hybrid with Gymnadenia odoratissima
- ×Dactylodenia st-quintinii (Godfery) J. Duvigneaud in De Langhe et al. – hybrid with Gymnadenia conopsea
- ×Rhizanthera martysiensis Balayer – hybrid with Platanthera chlorantha

== Gallery ==
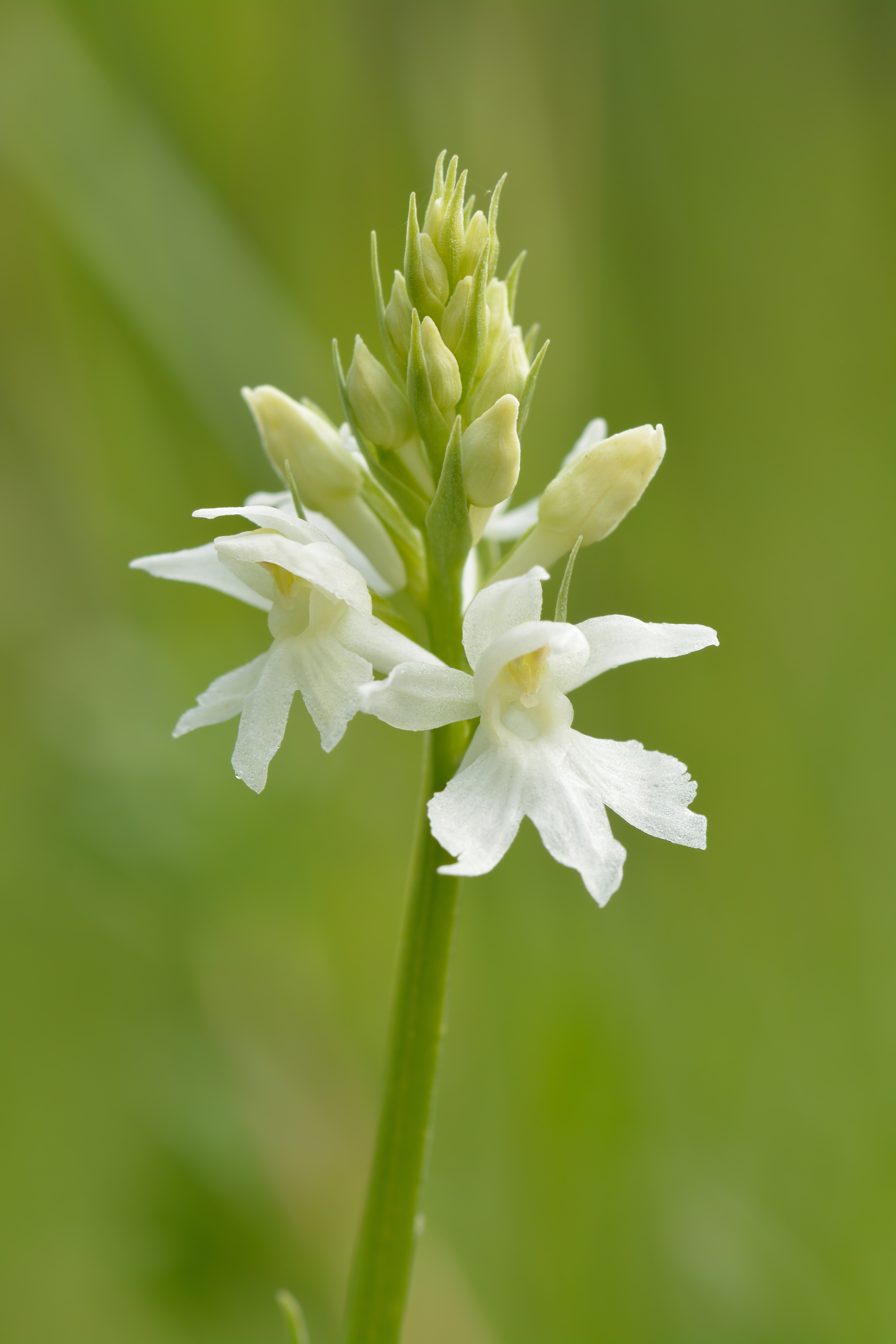
D. fuchsii var. alba, a white-flowered form

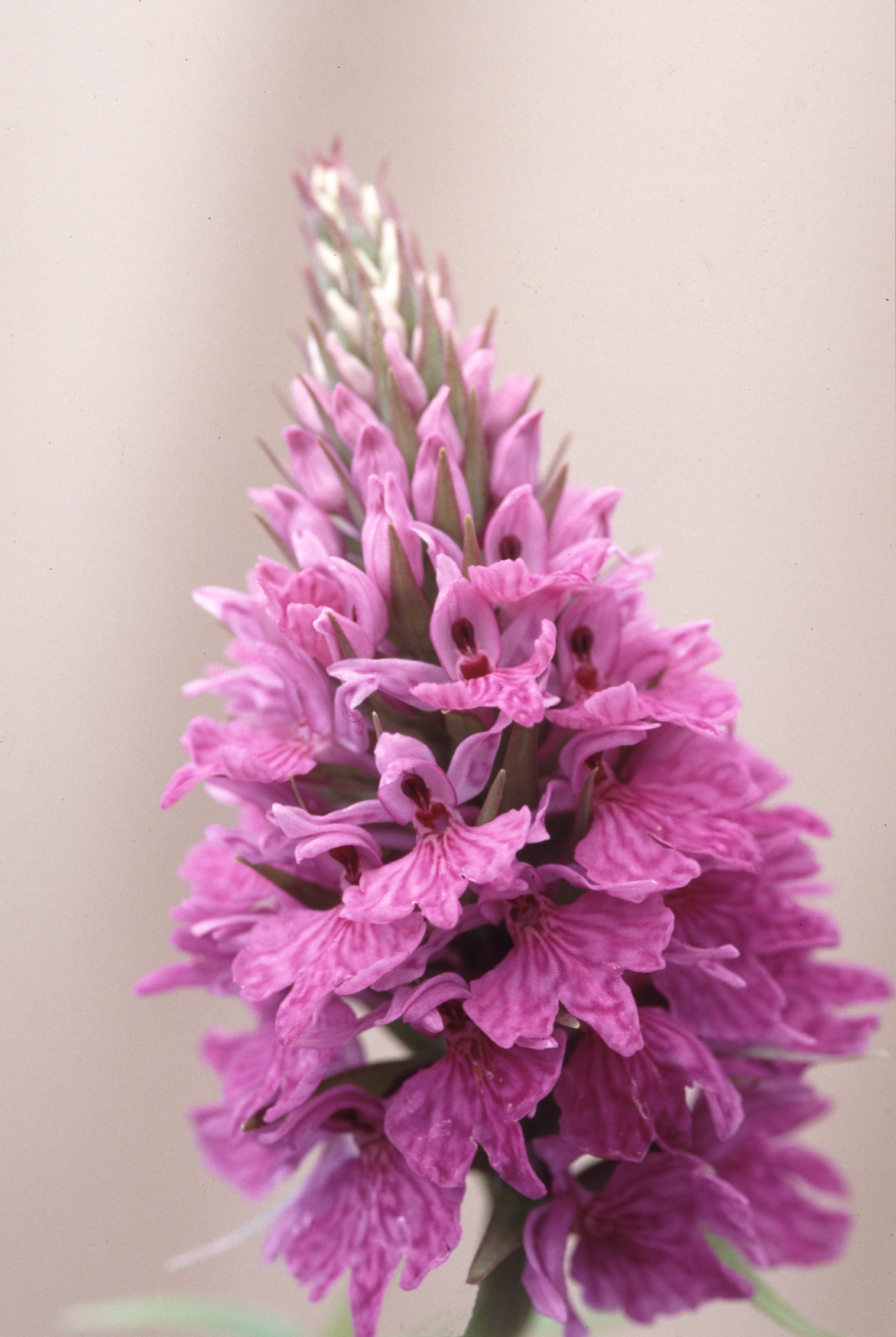
D. fuchsii subsp. hebridensis

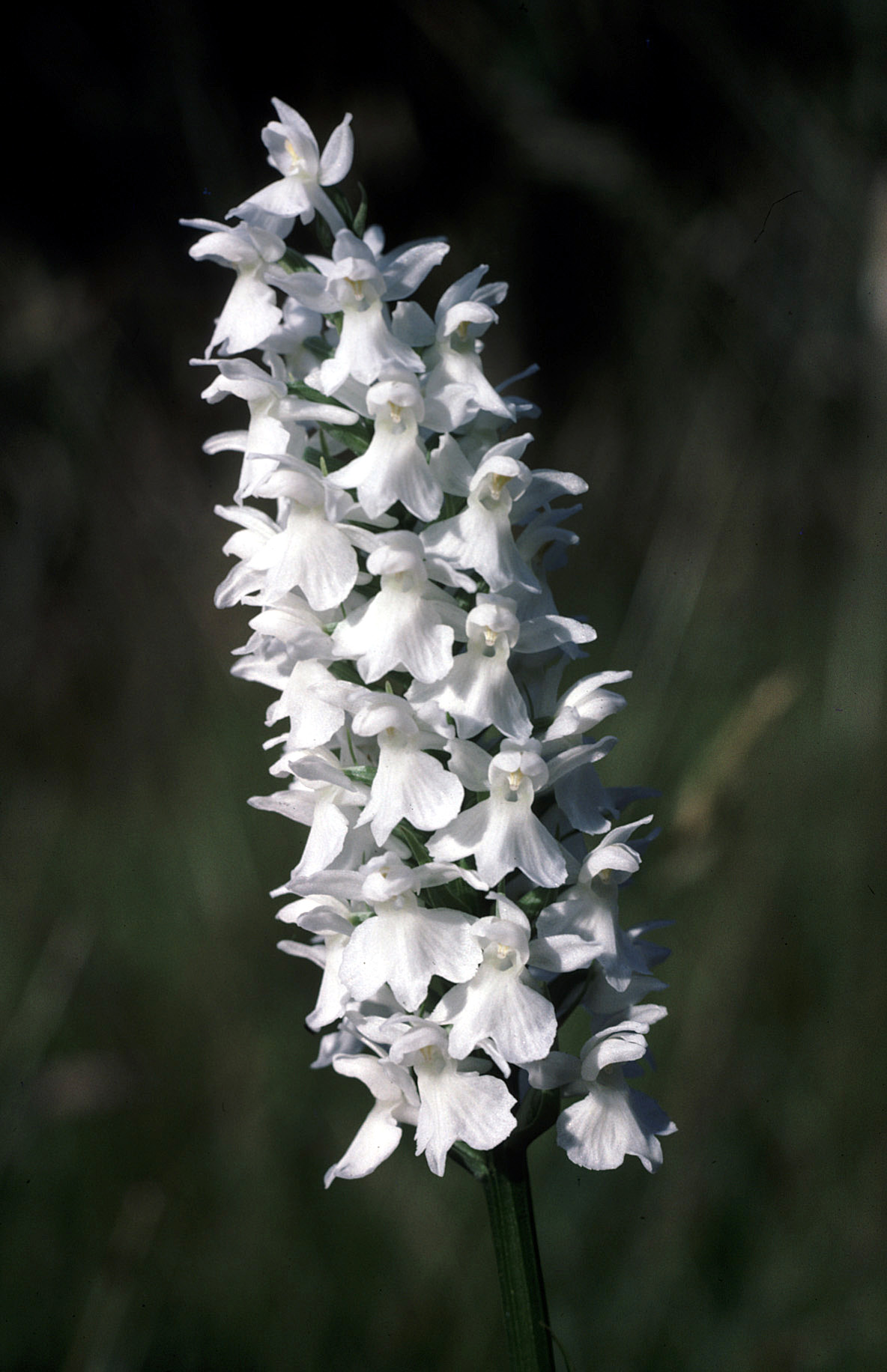
D. fuchsii subsp. okellyi

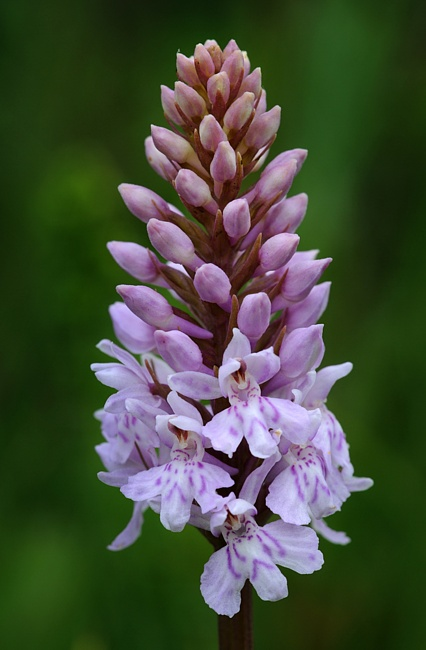
×Dactylodenia st-quintinii, a hybrid between D. fuchsii and Gymnadenia conopsea
