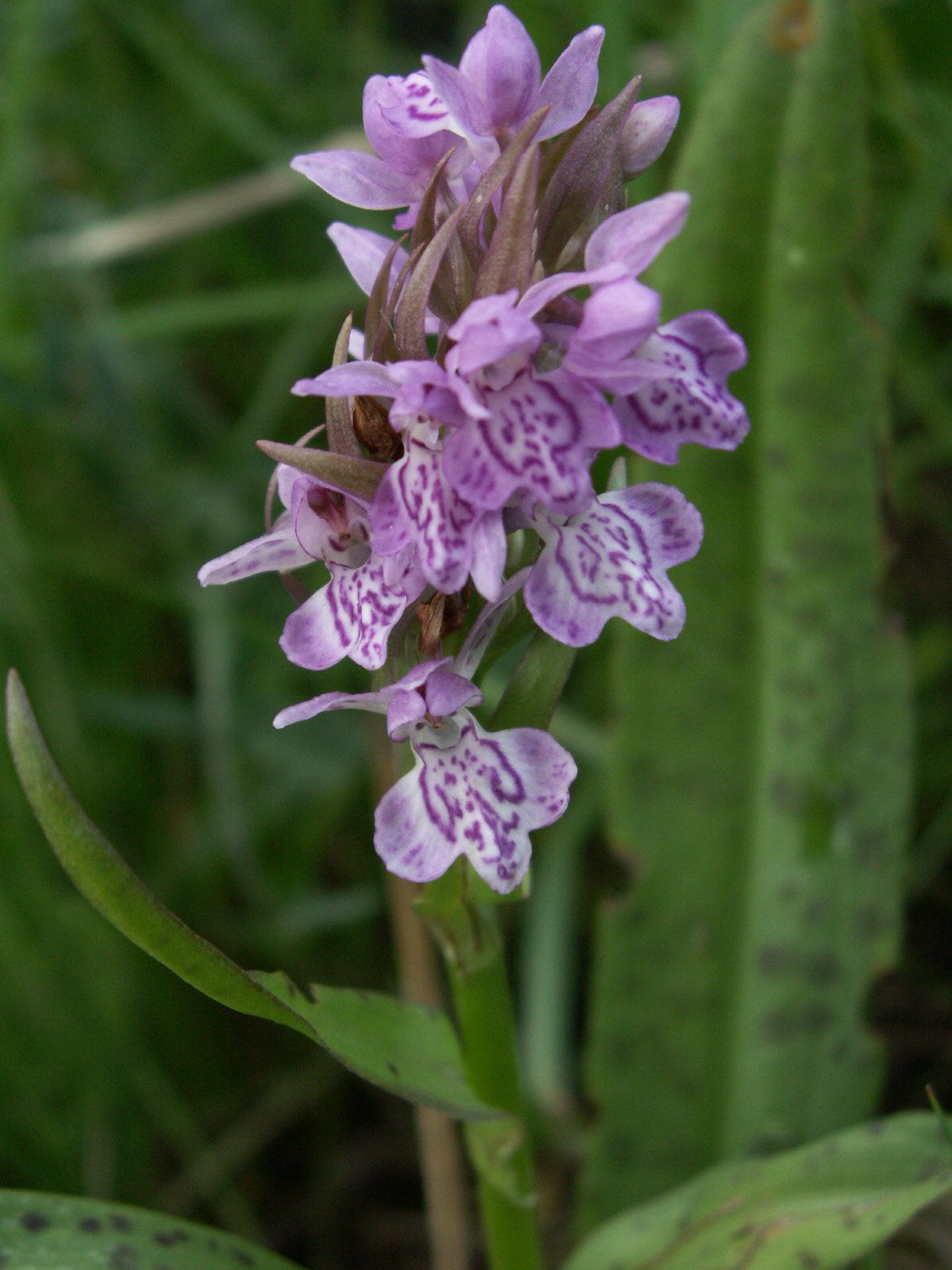

Scientific classification
- Kingdom: Plantae
- Clade: Embryophytes
- Clade: Tracheophytes
- Clade: Spermatophytes
- Clade: Angiosperms
- Clade: Monocots
- Order: Asparagales
- Family: Orchidaceae
- Subfamily: Orchidoideae
- Genus: Dactylorhiza
- Species: D. majalis
- Subspecies: D. m. subsp. baltica

Trinomial name
- Dactylorhiza majalis subsp. baltica (Klinge) H.Sund. (1980)

Synonyms
- Dactylorchis baltica (Klinge) Verm. (1947); Dactylorchis longifolia (Neuman) Verm. (1947); Dactylorhiza baltica (Klinge) N.I.Orlova (1970); Dactylorhiza baltica var. kuzkenembe Pikner (2012); Dactylorhiza latifolia subsp. baltica (Klinge) Soó (1962); Dactylorhiza latifolia var. longifolia (Neuman) Soó (1962); Dactylorhiza longifolia (Neuman) Aver. (1984); Orchis baltica (Klinge) A.Fuchs (1919); Orchis latifolia f. baltica (Klinge) M.Schulze (1902); Orchis latifolia subsp. baltica Klinge (1898); Orchis latifolia var. tenuior Neuman (1909); Orchis longifolia Neuman (1909); Orchis longifolia var. gracilis Neuman (1909)

= Dactylorhiza majalis subsp. baltica =

Subspecies of flowering plant

Dactylorhiza majalis subsp. baltica is a subspecies of Dactylorhiza majalis. Sometimes this plant is considered as a separate species, Dactylorhiza baltica.

This plant ranges from northern Poland to the Baltic states, Finland, central and northern European Russia, western and central Siberia, and Kazakhstan.

The plant was first described as Orchis latifolia subsp. baltica by Johannes Christoph Klinge in 1898. In 1980 it was renamed Dactylorhiza majalis subsp. baltica.
