= Klinge (disambiguation) =

Klinge may refer to:

== Geography ==
- Klinge (landform), a small, steep, V-shaped valley in southern Germany

== Places ==
- Klinge, a village in the Lausitz region, east of the city of Cottbus in Brandenburg, Germany
- De Klinge, a Belgian town and part of the municipality of Sint-Gillis-Waas in the province of Oost-Vlaanderen

== People ==
- Jenny Klinge (born 1975), Norwegian politician for the Centre Party
- Johannes Christoph Klinge (1851–1902), Baltic-German botanist
- Manuel Klinge (born 1984), German professional ice hockey player
- Marcel Klinge (born 1980), German politician
- Matti Klinge (born 1936), Finnish historian
