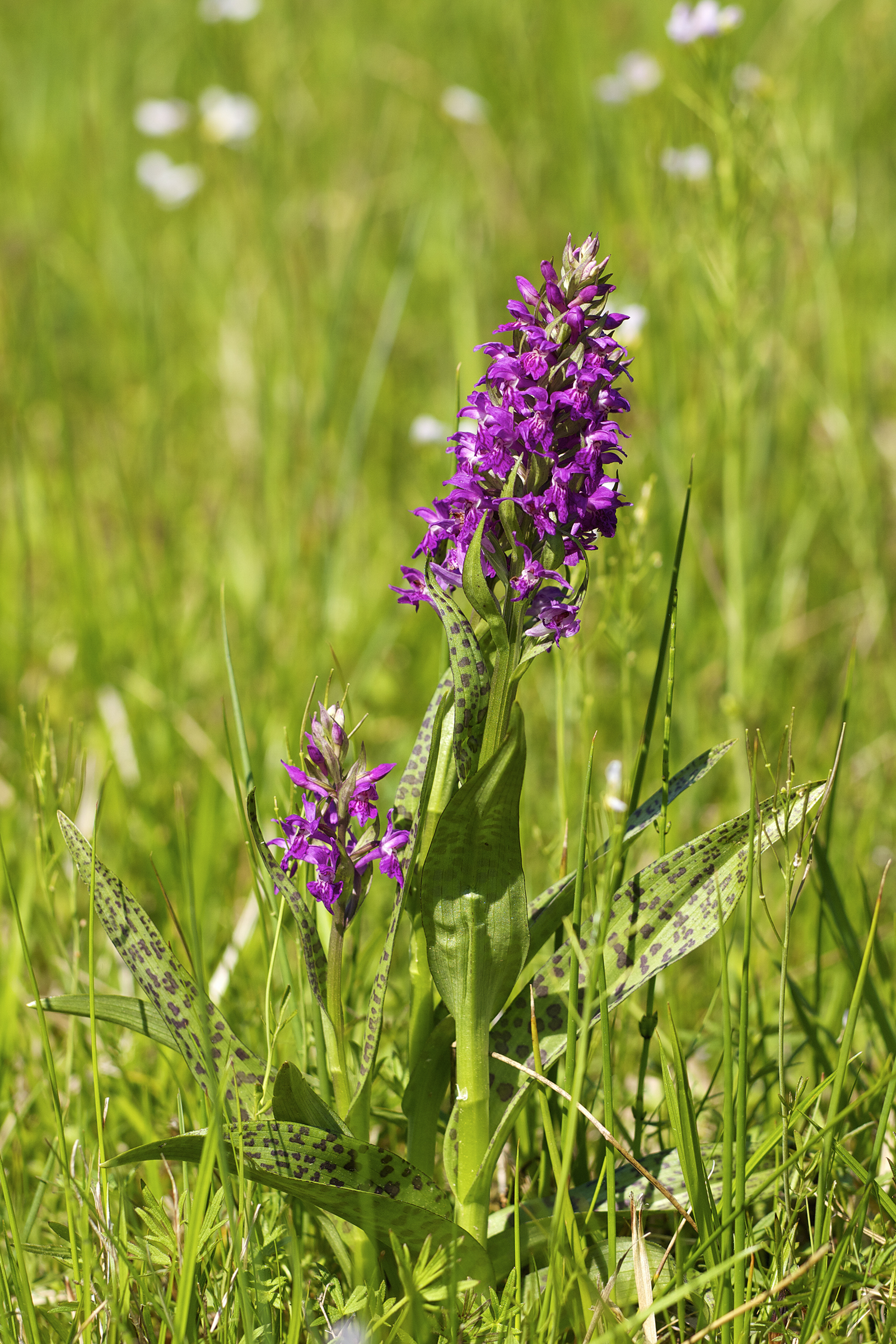

Scientific classification
- Kingdom: Plantae
- Clade: Tracheophytes
- Clade: Angiosperms
- Clade: Monocots
- Order: Asparagales
- Family: Orchidaceae
- Subfamily: Orchidoideae
- Genus: Dactylorhiza
- Species: D. majalis

Binomial name
- Dactylorhiza majalis (Rchb.) P.F.Hunt & Summerh. (1965)

Subspecies
- 15; see text

Synonyms
- Dactylorchis majalis (Rchb.) Verm. (1947); Dactylorhiza comosa subsp. majalis (Rchb.) P.D.Sell (1996); Orchis latifolia subsp. majalis (Rchb.) Klinge (1898); Orchis latifolia var. majalis (Rchb.) Kitt. (1837); Orchis latifolia var. majalis (Rchb.) Nyman (1882); Orchis majalis Rchb. (1828), nom. cons.

= Dactylorhiza majalis =

Species of flowering plant in the orchid family

Dactylorhiza majalis, or the broad-leaved marsh orchid, is a terrestrial Eurasian orchid.

Subspecies include the western marsh orchid (Dactylorhiza majalis subsp. occidentalis) and southern marsh orchid (Dactylorhiza majalis subsp. praetermissa).

The broad-leaved marsh orchid grows mainly in nitrogen-poor marsh areas that consist of several plant communities. More rarely, it is found in fens. Its flowering period begins at lower elevations as early as the beginning of May and ends in higher elevations at the end of July. The lowest blossoms usually open even before the stem has reached its full height.

== Description ==
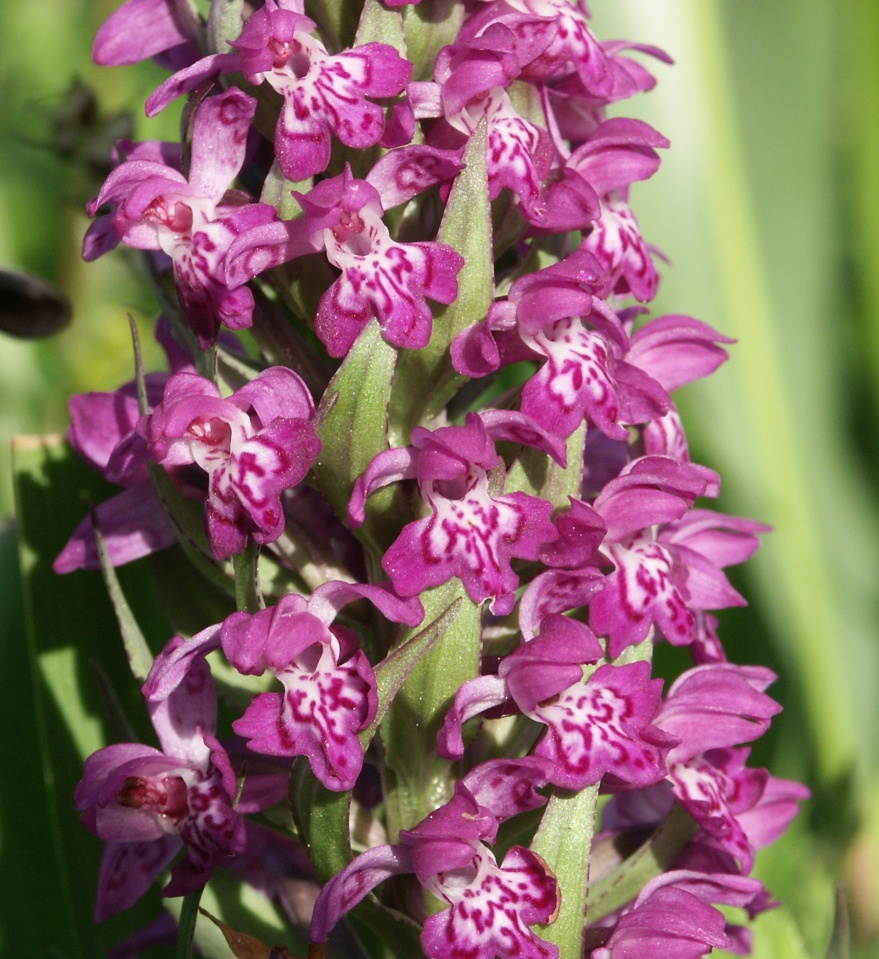
Detail of inflorescence

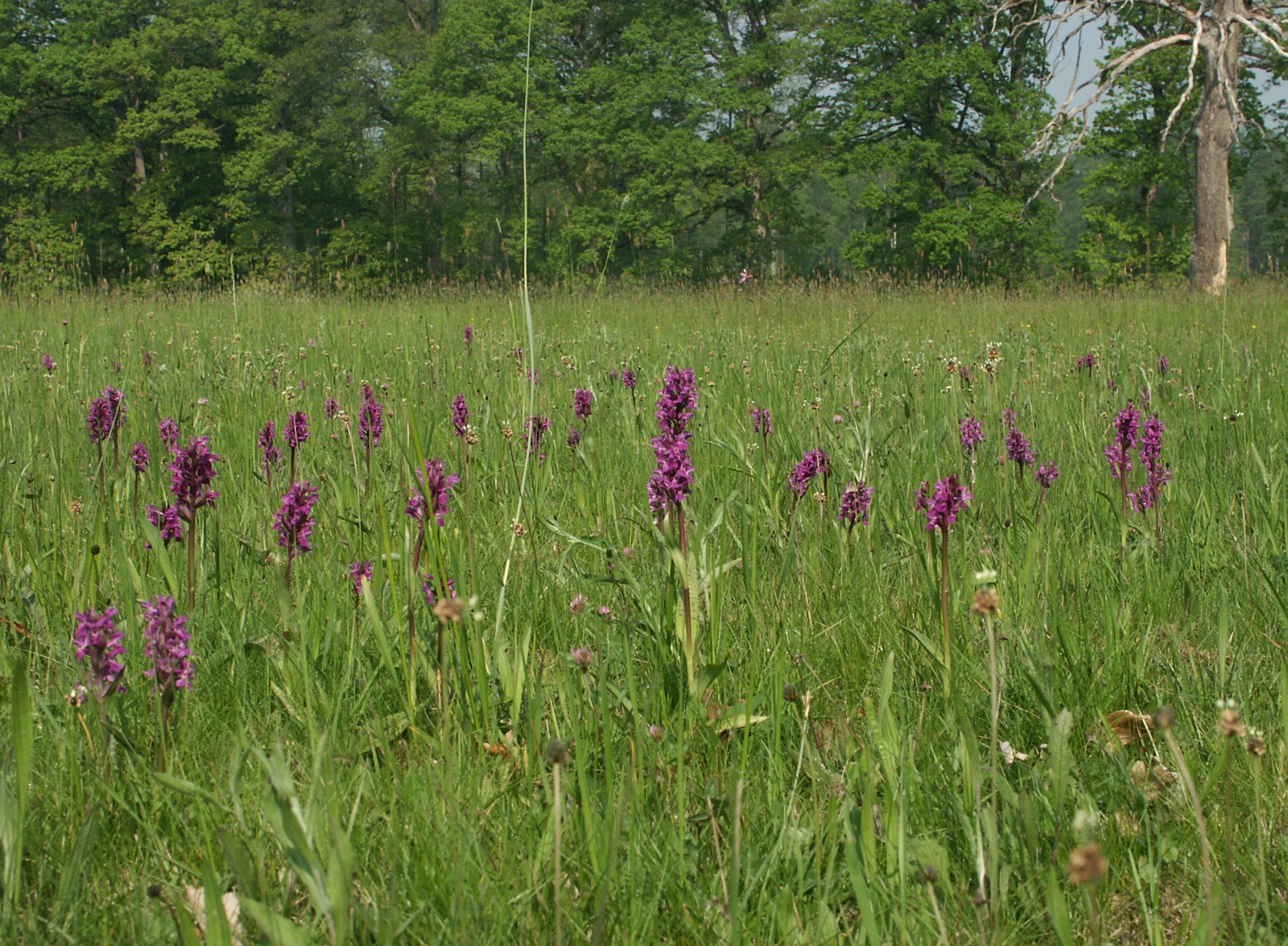
In a damp forest meadow in Baden-Württemberg, Germany

On average, Dactylorhiza majalis is 15 to 40 cm (6 to 15 1/2 in) tall, though specimens can grow up to 60 cm (2.0 ft). Four to ten spotted leaves (either purple or burgundy in color) are distributed around the stem, which is hollow. The leaves are ovate to lanceolate and 6 to 18 cm (2 1/2 to 7 in) long by 1.5 to 3.5 cm (1/2 to 1 1/2 in) wide, and get smaller and more lanceolate as they approach the inflorescence. The bracts are about as long as the blossom and cover it before it blooms. The densely flowered inflorescence, which is approximately 5 to 15 cm (2 to 6 in) long, is initially conical, but distinctly cylindrical when in full blossom. The seven to fifty blossoms are colored purplish red, rarely light pink or white. The lateral tepals of the external circle of the perianth stand obliquely or vertically upright. They are 7 to 12 mm (1/4 to 1/2 in) long and 2.5 to 5 mm (1/8 to 3/16 in) wide. The middle tepal is smaller and forms a "helmet" together with the two lateral tepals of the internal circle. These are 6 to 11 mm (1/4 to 7/16 in) long. The trilobate lip is 5 to 10 mm (3/16 to 3/8 in) long and 7 to 14 mm (1/4 to 9/16 in) wide. The shape and pattern of the lips are variable. In the lighter central area of the lip the markings are made up of lines, streaks, or dots. The spur is bent slightly downwards and is not quite as long as the ovary. The tuber has a palmate division and an irregular shape.

The broad-leaved marsh orchid has a karyotype of four sets of twenty chromosomes (2n = 4x = 80) and a genome size of 14.24 Gbp (2C). The seed of this orchid contains no endosperm for the embryo. Therefore, germination can take place only by means of infection with a root fungus (mycorrhiza).

== Taxonomy ==
In 1828 Ludwig Reichenbach described the broad-leaved marsh orchid as Orchis majalis. The name became the basionym after Peter Francis Hunt and Victor Samuel Summerhayes transferred the species to the genus Dactylorhiza in 1965. Sometimes the name Dactylorhiza fistulosa is used, but since this description is not valid, the name cannot be used despite its earlier publication in 1794 as Orchis fistulosa.

Many synonyms have been published:

- Orchis majalis Rchb.
- Dactylorchis majalis (Rchb.) Verm
- Orchis baltica (Klinge) A.Fuchs
- Dactylorchis baltica (Klinge) Verm.
- Dactylorhiza baltica (Klinge) N.I.Orlova
- Orchis longifolia Neuman
- Orchis kerryensis Wilmott
- Dactylorchis kerryensis (Wilmott) Verm.
- Dactylorhiza kerryensis (Wilmott) P.F.Hunt & Summerh.
- Dactylorhiza parvimajalis D.Tyteca & Gathoye
- Orchis occidentalis (Pugsley) Wilmott
- Dactylorchis occidentalis (Pugsley) Verm.
- Dactylorhiza occidentalis (Pugsley) P.Delforge
- Orchis sphagnicola Höppner
- Dactylorchis sphagnicola (Höppner) Verm.
- Dactylorhiza sphagnicola (Höppner) Aver.
- Dactylorchis hoeppneri (A.Fuchs) Verm.
- Orchis hoeppneri (A.Fuchs) Höppner ex Verm.
- Dactylorchis deweveri Verm.
- Dactylorhiza deweveri (Verm.) Soó
- Dactylorhiza hoeppneri (A.Fuchs) Soó
- Dactylorhiza sennia Vollmar

=== Subspecies and varieties ===
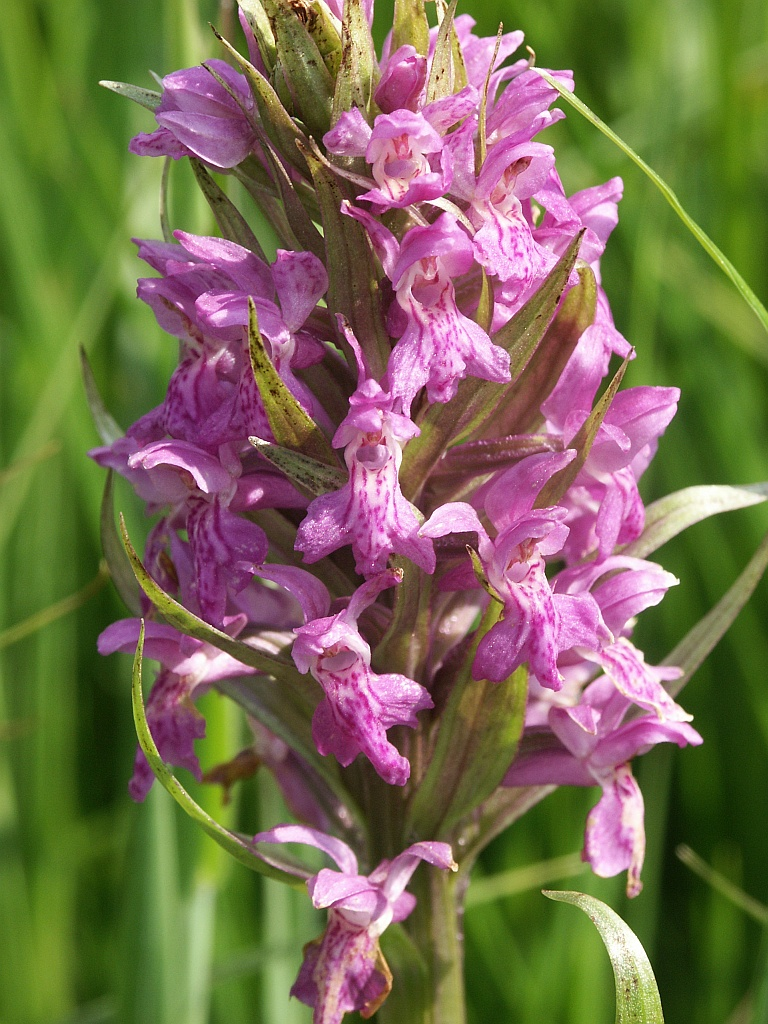
Dactylorhiza × aschersoniana

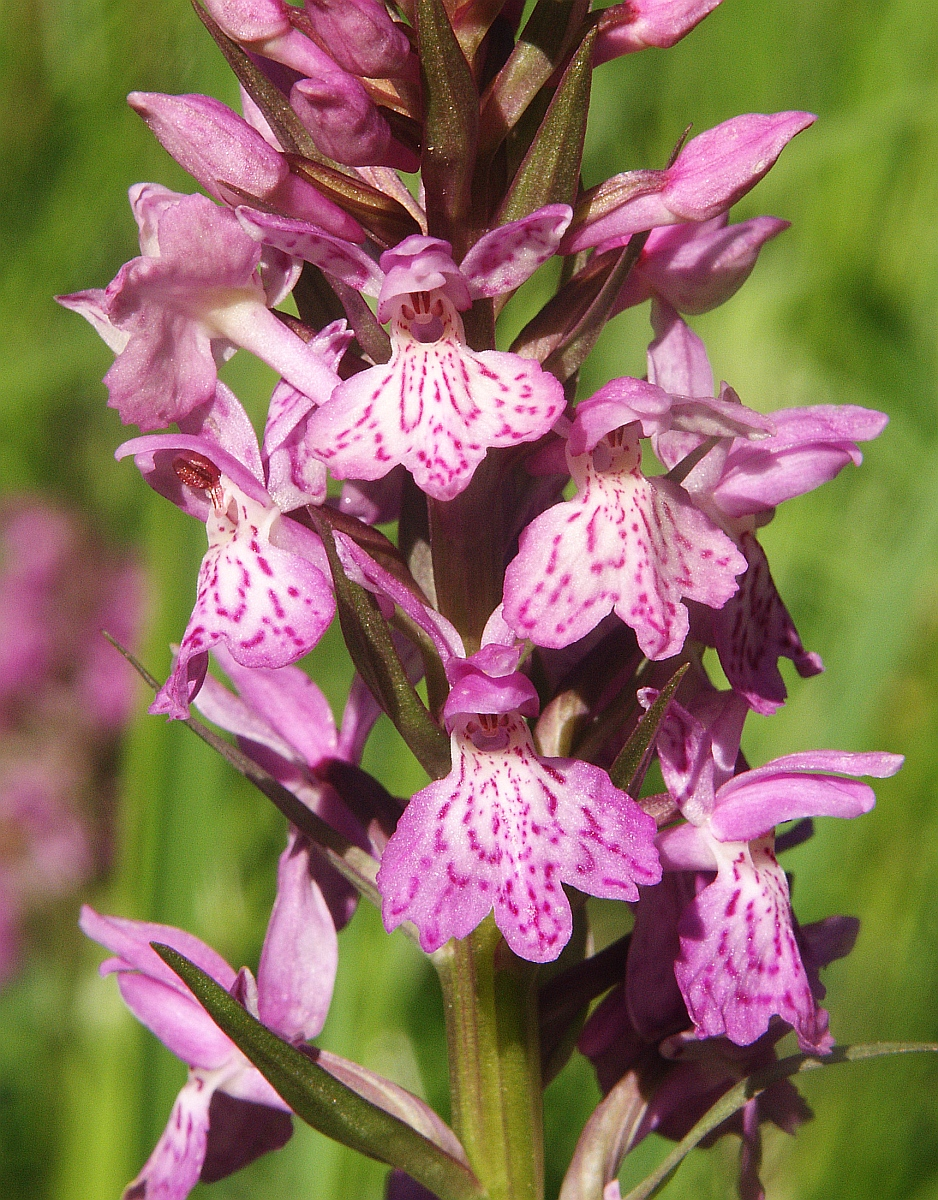
Dactylorhiza × braunii

Many names have been proposed at the subspecies, variety and form levels. As of August 2024 15 subspecies are accepted.

- Dactylorhiza majalis subsp. baltica (Klinge) H.Sund. – Finland, Germany, the Baltic Republics, Russia, Siberia, Kazakhstan
- Dactylorhiza majalis subsp. calcifugiens H.A.Pedersen – northern Denmark
- Dactylorhiza majalis subsp. cordigera (Fr.) H.Sund. – southeastern Europe and Ukraine
- Dactylorhiza majalis subsp. elatior (Fr.) Hedrén & H.A.Pedersen – Baltic islands
- Dactylorhiza majalis nothosubsp. godferyana (Soó) M.H.J.van der Meer (D. majalis subsp. majalis × D. majalis subsp. praetermissa) – Belgium and France
- Dactylorhiza majalis subsp. kalopissii (E.Nelson) H.A.Pedersen, P.J.Cribb & Rolf Kühn – southern Albania and northern Greece
- Dactylorhiza majalis subsp. lapponica (Laest. ex Hartm.) H.Sund. – Europe to western Siberia
- Dactylorhiza majalis subsp. macedonica (J.Hölz. & Künkele) H.A.Pedersen, P.J.Cribb & Rolf Kühn – southeastern Albania and northern Greece
- Dactylorhiza majalis subsp. majalis – widespread across much of Europe from Spain to Russia
- Dactylorhiza majalis subsp. nieschalkiorum (H.Baumann & Künkele) H.A.Pedersen, P.J.Cribb & Rolf Kühn – northern Turkey
- Dactylorhiza majalis subsp. occidentalis (Pugsley) P.D.Sell – Britain and Ireland
- Dactylorhiza majalis subsp. pindica (B.Willing & E.Willing) H.A.Pedersen, P.J.Cribb & Rolf Kühn – Romania and Bulgaria to northwestern Greece
- Dactylorhiza majalis subsp. praetermissa (Druce) D.M.Moore & Soó – France, Great Britain, Benelux, Germany, Denmark, and Norway
- Dactylorhiza majalis subsp. pythagorae (Gölz & H.R.Reinhard) H.A.Pedersen, P.J.Cribb & Rolf Kühn – Samos
- Dactylorhiza majalis subsp. sphagnicola (Höppner) H.A.Pedersen & Hedrén – Scandinavia, Germany, France, Belgium, Netherlands

=== Hybrids ===
Hybrids between subspecies include:

- Dactylorhiza × dufftiana (M.Schulze) Soó (syn. Dactylorhiza × kuehnensis Presser & Riech.) (D. majalis subsp. majalis × D. majalis subsp. lapponica)

The broad-leaved marsh orchid hybridizes quite commonly with other species of its genus. Some inter-species hybrids include:

- Dactylorhiza × aschersoniana (Dactylorhiza incarnata × D. majalis)
- Dactylorhiza × braunii (D. maculata × D. majalis)
  - Dactylorhiza × braunii nothosubsp. braunii (D. maculata subsp. fuchsii × D. majalis subsp. majalis)
  - Dactylorhiza × braunii nothosubsp. lilacina (F.Proch.) Holub (D. maculata subsp. fuchsii × D. majalis subsp. turfosa)
- Dactylorhiza × ruppertii (D. majalis × Dactylorhiza sambucina)
- Dactylorhiza × senayi (Alleiz.) Soó (D. maculata × D. majalis)
  - Dactylorhiza × senayi nothosubsp. senayi (D. maculata subsp. maculata × D. majalis subsp. majalis)
  - Dactylorhiza × senayi nothosubsp. wiefelspuetziana (D.Tyteca) Oddone (D. maculata subsp. maculata × D. majalis subsp. sphagnicola)

More rarely, hybrids with other genera (intergeneric hybrids) occur.

- ×Dactyloglossum drucei (Coeloglossum viride × Dactylorhiza majalis)
- ×Dactylodenia lebrunii (Dactylorhiza majalis × Gymnadenia conopsea)

=== Formerly placed here ===
- Dactylorhiza francis-drucei (Wilmott) Aver. (as Dactylorhiza majalis var. francis-drucei (Wilmott) R.M.Bateman & Denholm)
  - Dactylorhiza francis-drucei var. ebudensis (Wief. ex R.M.Bateman & Denholm) R.M.Bateman & Denholm (as Dactylorhiza majalis var. ebudensis Wief. ex R.M.Bateman & Denholm and D. majalis subsp. ebudensis (Wief. ex R.M.Bateman & Denholm) M.R.Lowe)
  - Dactylorhiza francis-drucei subsp. traunsteinerioides (Pugsley) R.M.Bateman & Denholm (as Dactylorhiza majalis var. traunsteinerioides (Pugsley) R.M.Bateman & Denholm and D. majalis subsp. traunsteinerioides (Pugsley) R.M.Bateman & Denholm)

== Range ==
Dactylorhiza majalis is widespread across much of Europe and north-central Asia, from Spain and Ireland to Siberia and Kazakhstan.

In Germany the broad-leaved marsh orchid is widespread but with several gaps. In many places, especially from western to northern Germany, it is extinct.

In Switzerland it is also quite widespread. A significant gap is found south of the Aar between Aarau and Lake Neuchâtel.

== Conservation ==
Although the broad-leaved marsh orchid is commonly found in some regions, it is nevertheless protected as an orchid.

As with many marsh plants, the numbers of this species have been dwindling for quite some time. The main causes are the entry of nitrogen via fertilizer, drying out of the habitat, and intensive conversion to pasture. The broad-leaved marsh orchid does not react so sensitively to changes in its habitat as for example the early marsh orchid, Dactylorhiza incarnata. It is usually the last of the native orchids to disappear. This tolerance makes it a still relatively common species.
