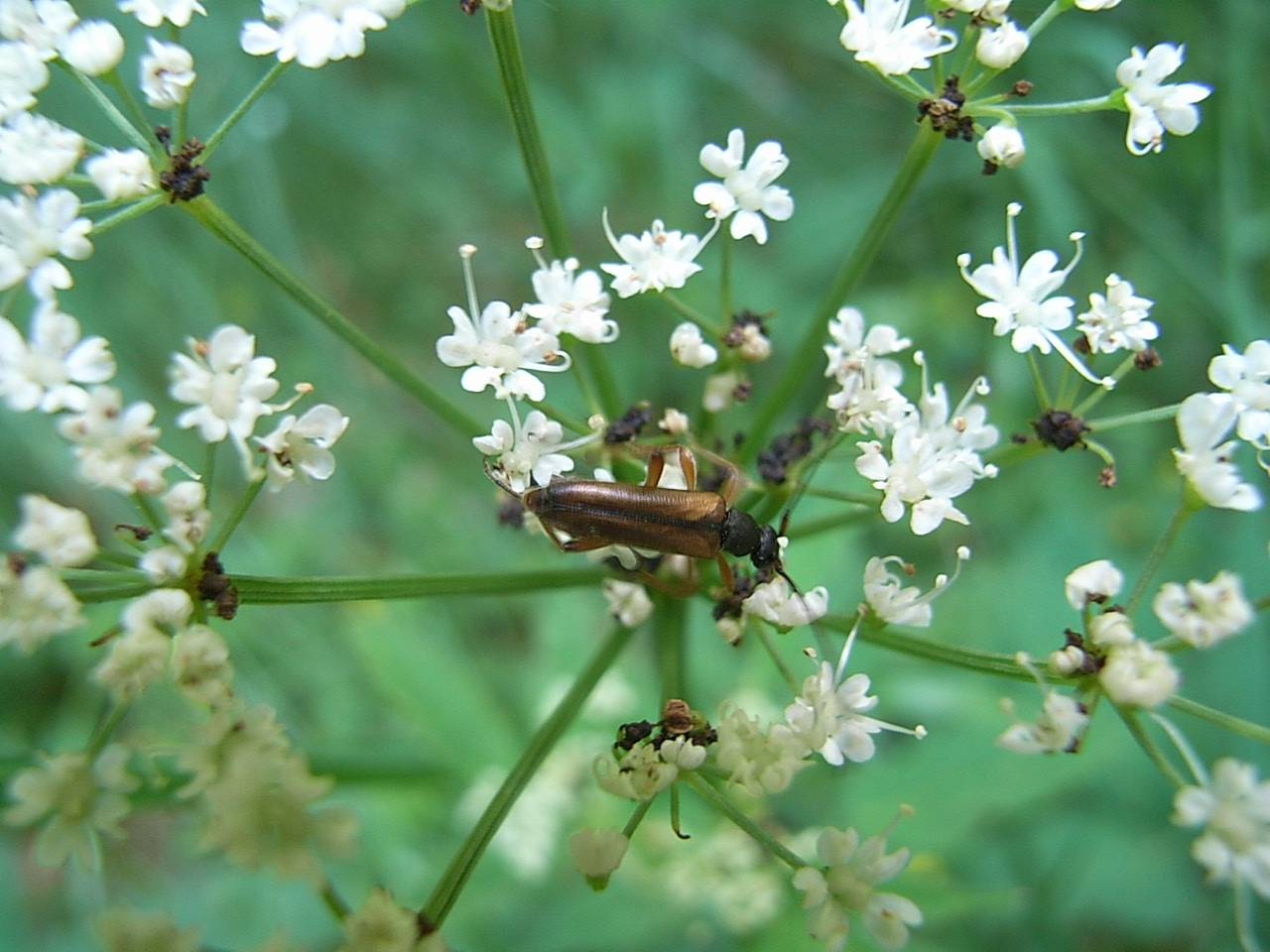
- Alosterna tabacicolor

Scientific classification
- Domain: Eukaryota
- Kingdom: Animalia
- Phylum: Arthropoda
- Class: Insecta
- Order: Coleoptera
- Suborder: Polyphaga
- Infraorder: Cucujiformia
- Family: Cerambycidae
- Tribe: Lepturini
- Genus: Alosterna; Mulsant, 1863

Extant species
- See text

= Alosterna =

Genus of beetles

Alosterna is a genus of beetles belonging to the family Cerambycidae.

The genus was described in 1863 by Étienne Mulsant.

The genus has cosmopolitan distribution.

Species:

- Alosterna anatolica Adlbauer, 1992
- Alosterna bicoloripes Pic, 1914
- Alosterna erythropus (Gebler, 1841)
- Alosterna ingrica
- Alosterna pauli Pesarini, Rapuzzi & Sabbadini, 2004
- Alosterna perpera Danilevsky, 1988
- Alosterna scapularis Heyden, 1878
- Alosterna tabacicolor Degeer, 1775
