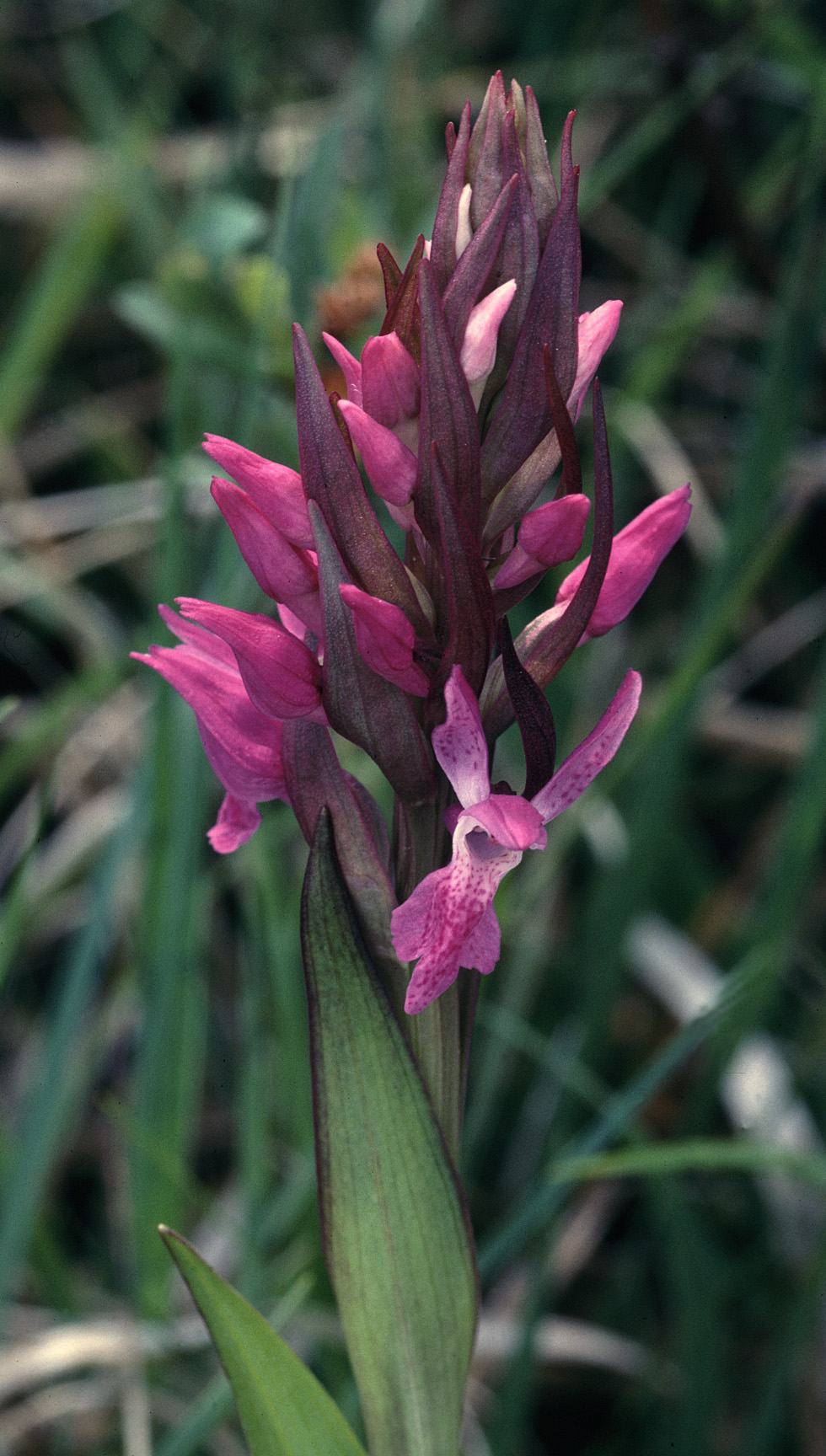
- Growing in The Burren, Ireland

Scientific classification
- Kingdom: Plantae
- Clade: Embryophytes
- Clade: Tracheophytes
- Clade: Spermatophytes
- Clade: Angiosperms
- Clade: Monocots
- Order: Asparagales
- Family: Orchidaceae
- Subfamily: Orchidoideae
- Genus: Dactylorhiza
- Species: D. francis-drucei
- Subspecies: D. f. subsp. traunsteinerioides

Trinomial name
- Dactylorhiza francis-drucei subsp. traunsteinerioides (Pugsley) R.M.Bateman & Denholm (2023)

Synonyms
- Dactylorchis traunsteinerioides (Pugsley) Verm. (1947); Dactylorhiza majalis var. traunsteinerioides (Pugsley) R.M.Bateman & Denholm (1983); Dactylorhiza majalis subsp. traunsteinerioides (Pugsley) R.M.Bateman & Denholm (1983); Dactylorhiza traunsteineri subsp. traunsteinerioides (Pugsley) Soó (1962); Dactylorhiza traunsteinerioides (Pugsley) Landwehr (1975); Orchis majalis subsp. traunsteinerioides Pugsley (1936); Orchis traunsteinerioides (Pugsley) Pugsley (1940)

= Dactylorhiza francis-drucei subsp. traunsteinerioides =

Narrow-leaved marsh-orchid

Subspecies of orchid

Dactylorhiza francis-drucei subsp. traunsteinerioides, known as the narrow-leaved marsh-orchid and Pugsley's marsh orchid, is a subspecies of Dactylorhiza francis-drucei (the western marsh-orchid) found only in Great Britain and Ireland. It is also treated as the species Dactylorhiza traunsteinerioides.

== Description ==
Dactylorhiza francis-drucei subsp. traunsteinerioides grows to 30 cm (12 in) tall, occasionally up to 50 cm (20 in). Its leaves are at most 18 mm (0.7 in) wide, usually notably less, and may or may not be spotted. The flowers have a lip or labellum 5–10 mm (0.2–0.4 in) long by 7–11 mm (0.3–0.4 in) wide, usually three-lobed but always with a distinct central "point". The labellum is reddish-purple, usually with dark markings reaching to the edges.

== Taxonomy ==
The taxon was first given a scientific name in 1936 by H. W. Pugsley; he described plants found in Britain and Ireland as Orchis majalis subsp. traunsteinerioides (Orchis majalis being the name used at the time for the species now called Dactylorhiza majalis). In 1940, Pugsley raised it from a subspecies to the full species Orchis traunsteineriodes. The marsh-orchids were later separated as the genus Dactylorhiza, and in 1947 Pieter Vermeulen first transferred the taxon to Dactylorhiza traunsteineriodes. This name continues to be used by Clive Stace in the 2010 edition of New Flora of the British Isles. Other current sources consider it to be the subspecies Dactylorhiza francis-drucei subsp. traunsteineri.

The narrow lower leaves of D. francis-drucei subsp. traunsteineriodes distinguish it from other Dactylorhiza taxa found in Britain and Ireland with the exception of D. francis-drucei var. ebudensis (syn. D. ebudensis). The latter is found only on North Uist in the Outer Hebrides of Scotland and has heavily spotted stem leaves and a less trilobed labellum, with a shorter central lobe, although genetic studies published in 2011 suggest that it is not distinct from D. majalis subsp. traunsteineriodes. Plants found in Britain and Ireland and identified as Dactylorhiza traunsteineri or D. majalis subsp. lapponica (a.k.a. D. lapponica) belong to this taxon, neither species being found in these countries.

== Distribution and habitat ==
D. francis-drucei subsp. traunsteinerioides is endemic to Great Britain and western Ireland. It is found in damp base-rich locations, including calcareous fens. Stace (2010) gives its distribution within Britain as "especially East Anglia, Yorkshire, north Wales and western Scotland". On the basis of genetic studies, Hedrén et al. (2011) say that plants attributed to subsp. traunsteinerioides found below a line extending from the mid-Wales coast to the Humber Estuary in Yorkshire actually belong to D. majalis subsp. praetermissa.
