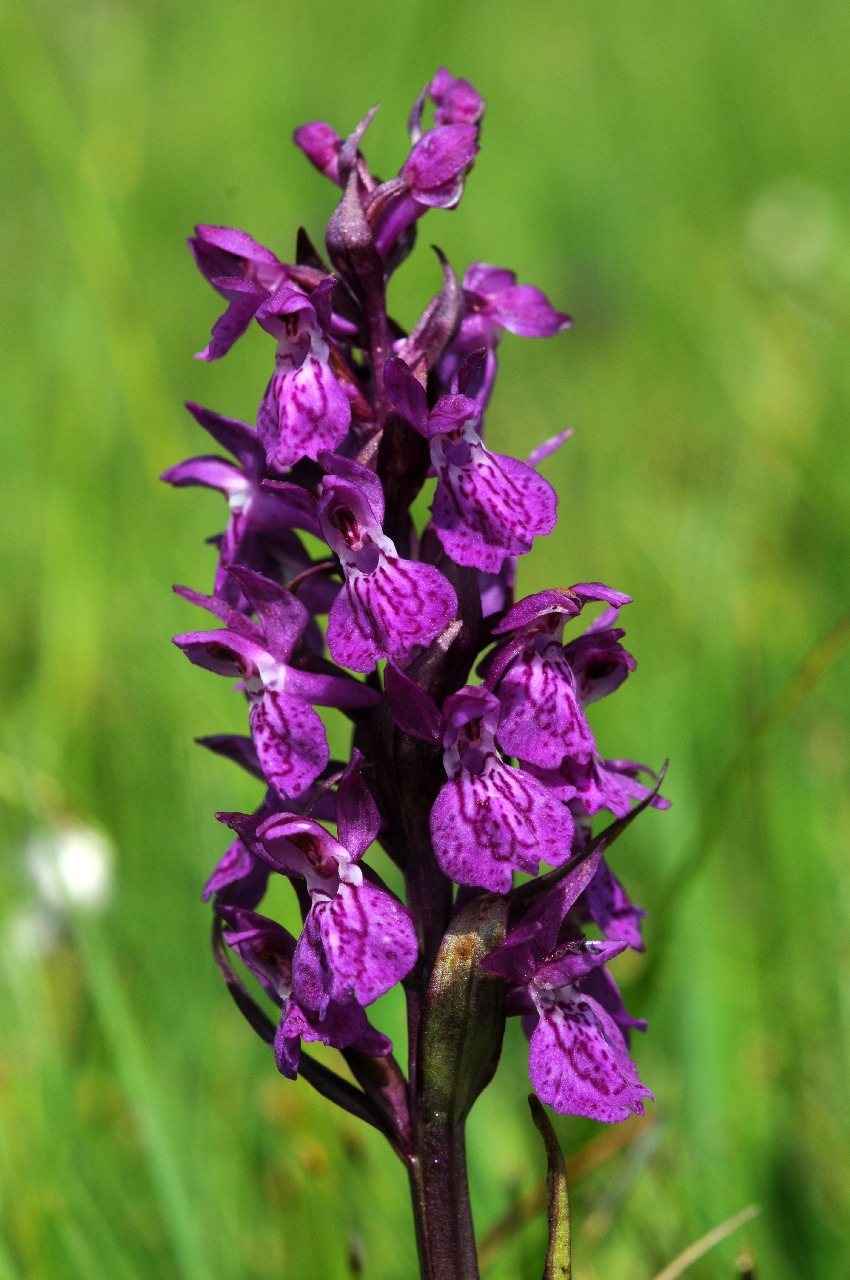

Scientific classification
- Kingdom: Plantae
- Clade: Tracheophytes
- Clade: Angiosperms
- Clade: Monocots
- Order: Asparagales
- Family: Orchidaceae
- Subfamily: Orchidoideae
- Genus: Dactylorhiza
- Species: D. majalis
- Subspecies: D. m. subsp. lapponica

Trinomial name
- Dactylorhiza majalis subsp. lapponica (Latest. ex Hartm.) H.Sund. (1975)

Synonyms
- Synonyms list: Dactylorchis curvifolia (F.Nyl.) Verm. (1947); Dactylorchis gracilis Hesl.-Harr. (1950); Dactylorchis lapponica (Laest. ex Hartm.) Verm. (1947); Dactylorchis pseudocordigera (Neuman) Lid (1952); Dactylorchis traunsteineri (Saut. ex Rchb.) Verm. (1947); Dactylorchis traunsteineri var. klingei Verm. (1949); Dactylorchis traunsteineri var. rhombilabris Verm. (1949); Dactylorhiza angustata (Arv.-Touv.) D.Tyteca & Gathoye (1991); Dactylorhiza bohemica Businský (1989); Dactylorhiza carpatica (Batoušek & Kreutz) P.Delforge (2000); Dactylorhiza comosa subsp. turfosa (F.Proch.) Holub (1998); Dactylorhiza curvifolia (F.Nyl.) Czerep. (1981); Dactylorhiza delphinensis D.Tyteca & Gathoye (1988); Dactylorhiza fuchsii subsp. carpatica (Batoušek & Kreutz) Kreutz (2004); Dactylorhiza gracilis (Höppner) Soó (1962); Dactylorhiza irenica F.M.Vázquez (2008); Dactylorhiza lapponica (Laest. ex Hartm.) Soó (1962); Dactylorhiza lapponica subsp. angustata (Arv.-Touv.) Kreutz (2004); Dactylorhiza lapponica var. pseudocordigera (Neuman) Kreutz (2007); Dactylorhiza lapponica subsp. rhaetica H.Baumann & R.Lorenz (2005); Dactylorhiza majalis subsp. traunsteineri (Saut. ex Rchb.) H.Sund. (1980); Dactylorhiza majalis subsp. turfosa F.Proch. (1982); Dactylorhiza pseudocordigera (Neuman) Soó (1962); Dactylorhiza pycnantha (Neuman) Aver. (1983); Dactylorhiza rhaetica (H.Baumann & R.Lorenz) Biagioli, Kreutz & De Simoni (2022); Dactylorhiza rhenana (Höppner) Soó (1962); Dactylorhiza rigida (Höppner) Soó (1962); Dactylorhiza schurii (Klinge) Aver. (1984); Dactylorhiza steegeri (Höppner) Soó (1962); Dactylorhiza suevica (A.Fuchs) Soó (1962); Dactylorhiza traunsteineri (Saut. ex Rchb.) Soó (1962); Dactylorhiza traunsteineri var. blyttii (Klinge) Soó (1962); Dactylorhiza traunsteineri subsp. bohemica (Businský) Kreutz & Sczep. (2007); Dactylorhiza traunsteineri subsp. carpatica Batoušek & Kreutz (1999); Dactylorhiza traunsteineri subsp. curvifolia (F.Nyl.) Soó (1962); Dactylorhiza traunsteineri var. curvifolia (F.Nyl.) Aver. (2000); Dactylorhiza traunsteineri var. estonica (Klinge) Soó (1962); Dactylorhiza traunsteineri subsp. hibernica Landwehr (1975); Dactylorhiza traunsteineri subsp. irenica (F.M.Vázquez) Kreutz (2011); Dactylorhiza traunsteineri var. mielichhoferi (Klinge) Soó (1962); Dactylorhiza traunsteineri var. nylandri (Klinge) Soó (1962); Dactylorhiza traunsteineri subsp. pycnantha (Neuman) Soó (1962); Dactylorhiza traunsteineri var. recurva (Klinge) Soó (1962); Dactylorhiza traunsteineri subsp. rhaetica (H.Baumann & R.Lorenz) F.Benoît (2015); Dactylorhiza traunsteineri subsp. schurii (Klinge) Kreutz (2014 publ. 2015); Dactylorhiza traunsteineri var. tarbatonica (Klinge) Soó (1962); Dactylorhiza traunsteineri subsp. turfosa (F.Proch.) Kreutz (2004); Dactylorhiza traunsteineri var. vosagiaca (Kreutz & P.Wolff) Sonnb. (2022); Dactylorhiza traunsteineri subsp. vosagiaca Kreutz & P.Wolff (2010 publ. 2011); Dactylorhiza traunsteineri subsp. wirtgenii (Höppner) Kreutz (2004); Dactylorhiza vironii Kreutz (2007); Dactylorhiza vosagiaca (Kreutz & P.Wolff) Herr-Heidtke & Heidtke ex P.Wolff (2017); Dactylorhiza wirtgenii (Höppner) Soó (1962); Orchis angustata Arv.-Touv. (1872); Orchis angustifolia var. abeliana Klinge (1899); Orchis angustifolia var. acuminata (Klinge) Neuman (1909); Orchis angustifolia f. acuminata Klinge (1899); Orchis angustifolia f. ammatica Klinge (1899); Orchis angustifolia f. amplivaginata Klinge (1899); Orchis angustifolia f. angustivaginata Klinge (1899); Orchis angustifolia f. anziensis Klinge (1899); Orchis angustifolia var. blyttii Klinge (1893); Orchis angustifolia var. brevifolia Klinge (1899); Orchis angustifolia f. brevispicata Klinge (1899); Orchis angustifolia f. comosa Klinge (1899); Orchis angustifolia subf. conferta Klinge (1899); Orchis angustifolia var. curvifolia (F.Nyl.) Nyman (1890); Orchis angustifolia subf. densata Klinge (1899); Orchis angustifolia f. densiflora Klinge (1899); Orchis angustifolia f. densissima Klinge (1899); Orchis angustifolia f. densiuscula Klinge (1899); Orchis angustifolia subf. dissita Klinge (1899); Orchis angustifolia subf. elegantior Klinge (1899); Orchis angustifolia var. elongata Klinge (1899); Orchis angustifolia var. erecta Klinge (1899); Orchis angustifolia var. estonica Klinge (1899); Orchis angustifolia f. fichtenbergii Klinge (1893); Orchis angustifolia subf. filiformis Klinge (1899); Orchis angustifolia f. friesii Klinge (1893); Orchis angustifolia subsp. friesii (Klinge) Neuman (1909); Orchis angustifolia f. gracilis Klinge (1899); Orchis angustifolia var. gracillima Klinge (1899); Orchis angustifolia subf. immaculata Klinge (1899), nom. illeg.; Orchis angustifolia subf. immaculata Klinge (1899), nom. illeg.; Orchis angustifolia f. immaculata Klinge (1899), nom. illeg.; Orchis angustifolia var. immaculata Klinge (1899), nom. illeg.; Orchis angustifolia subf. immaculata Klinge (1899), nom. illeg.; Orchis angustifolia subf. immaculata Klinge (1899), nom. illeg.; Orchis angustifolia f. immaculata Klinge (1899), nom. illeg.; Orchis angustifolia subf. immaculata Klinge (1899), nom. illeg.; Orchis angustifolia subf. immaculata Klinge (1899), nom. illeg.; Orchis angustifolia subf. immaculata Klinge (1893), nom. illeg.; Orchis angustifolia subf. immaculata Klinge (1893), nom. illeg.; Orchis angustifolia subf. intermedia Klinge (1899); Orchis angustifolia var. lapponica Laest. ex Hartm. (1843) (basionym); Orchis angustifolia f. laxa Klinge (1899); Orchis angustifolia subf. laxata Klinge (1899); Orchis angustifolia f. laxiflora Klinge (1899); Orchis angustifolia f. laxiuscula Klinge (1899); Orchis angustifolia f. lehnertii Klinge (1893); Orchis angustifolia f. levaschevoica Klinge (1899); Orchis angustifolia f. longispicata Klinge (1899); Orchis angustifolia subf. maculata Klinge (1893); Orchis angustifolia var. mielichhoferi Klinge (1899); Orchis angustifolia var. nylandri Klinge (1893); Orchis angustifolia f. oblonga Klinge (1899); Orchis angustifolia f. obtusifolia Klinge (1899); Orchis angustifolia f. paanajaervica Klinge (1899); Orchis angustifolia f. papjerwica Klinge (1899); Orchis angustifolia var. patens Klinge (1899); Orchis angustifolia f. perhoica Klinge (1899); Orchis angustifolia var. poenalica Klinge (1899); Orchis angustifolia f. pulcherrima Klinge (1899); Orchis angustifolia var. pusilla Neuman (1909); Orchis angustifolia subsp. pycnantha Neuman (1909); Orchis angustifolia var. recurva Klinge (1893); Orchis angustifolia f. reichenbachii Klinge (1893); Orchis angustifolia f. remota Klinge (1893); Orchis angustifolia var. reolana Klinge (1899); Orchis angustifolia var. rigidula Klinge (1899); Orchis angustifolia f. rosiensis Klinge (1899); Orchis angustifolia var. sanionis Klinge (1893); Orchis angustifolia var. sauteri (Klinge) Klinge (1899); Orchis angustifolia f. sauteri Klinge (1893); Orchis angustifolia f. schmidtii Klinge (1893); Orchis angustifolia f. schurii Klinge (1893); Orchis angustifolia f. spathulata Klinge (1899), nom. illeg.; Orchis angustifolia f. spathulata Klinge (1893); Orchis angustifolia var. stricta Klinge (1899), nom. illeg.; Orchis angustifolia subf. strictior Klinge (1899); Orchis angustifolia subsp. subcapitata Neuman (1909); Orchis angustifolia subf. subcurva (Klinge) Klinge (1899); Orchis angustifolia f. subcurva Klinge (1893); Orchis angustifolia f. suberecta Klinge (1899); Orchis angustifolia subf. superans Klinge (1899); Orchis angustifolia var. superba Klinge (1899); Orchis angustifolia var. tarbatonica Klinge (1899); Orchis angustifolia var. tenuifolia Klinge (1899); Orchis angustifolia f. tiudiensis Klinge (1899); Orchis angustifolia subsp. traunsteineri (Saut. ex Rchb.) C.Hartm. (1879); Orchis angustifolia subf. venusta Klinge (1899); Orchis curvifolia F.Nyl. (1844); Orchis gracilis Höppner (1927); Orchis incarnata var. angustifolia (Lindl.) Rchb.f. (1851), nom. illeg.; Orchis incarnata var. traunsteineri (Saut. ex Rchb.) Parl. (1860); Orchis lapponica (Laest. ex Hartm.) K.Richt. (1890); Orchis latifolia var. angustifolia Lindl. (1835); Orchis latifolia var. eboracensis Godfery (1884 publ. 1885); Orchis latifolia var. lapponica (Laest. ex Hartm.) Rchb.f. (1851); Orchis latifolia var. traunsteineri (Saut. ex Rchb.) Godr. (1844); Orchis maculata subsp. lapponica (Laest. ex Hartm.) Nyman (1882); Orchis maculata var. recurva (F.Nyl. ex Fr.) Nyman (1882); Orchis maculata f. schurii (Klinge) Soó (1933); Orchis maculata var. schurii (Klinge) Pauca (1972); Orchis maculata subsp. traunsteineri (Saut. ex Rchb.) Douin (1931); Orchis majalis var. eborensis Godfery (1933); Orchis pseudocordigera Neuman (1909); Orchis × pseudotraunsteineri subsp. suevica A.Fuchs (1919); Orchis recurva F.Nyl. (1845); Orchis rhenana Höppner (1916); Orchis rigida Höppner (1924 publ. 1925); Orchis sambucina var. subalpina Rchb.f. (1851); Orchis steegeri Höppner (1927); Orchis traunsteineri Saut. ex Rchb. (1831); Orchis traunsteineri var. schurii (Klinge) Asch. & Graebn. (1907); Orchis wirtgenii Höppner (1916)

= Dactylorhiza majalis subsp. lapponica =

Lapland marsh-orchid

Subspecies of flowering plant in the orchid family

Dactylorhiza majalis subsp. lapponica (synonym Dactylorhiza lapponica), the Lapland marsh-orchid, is an orchid native to parts of Europe and Siberia, including the Pyrenees, Alps, and Carpathians and across middle Europe, Scandinavia, and European Russia

The subspecies grows on calcareous soils, including fens and areas with mobile groundwater. It is pollinated by bumblebees.

It was originally published and described by Lars Levi Laestadius and Carl Johan Hartman as Orchis angustifolia var. lapponica in Handb. Skand. Fl., edition 4 on page 281 in 1843, but it was then re-named as Dactylorhiza lapponica in Nom. Nov. Gen. Dactylorhiza Vol.5 in 1962.

The naming of species and subspecies in genus Dactylorhiza has gone through many revisions over the decades, and D. majalis subsp. lapponica has over 170 synonyms. Dactylorhiza traunsteineri, the narrow-leaved marsh orchid or Traunsteiner's dactylorhiza, is now considered a synonym. Plants identified as D. traunsteineri in Britain and Ireland are now considered to be Dactylorhiza majalis subsp. traunsteinerioides, a view supported by genetic data.

The plant has been studied for In vitro seed germination.
