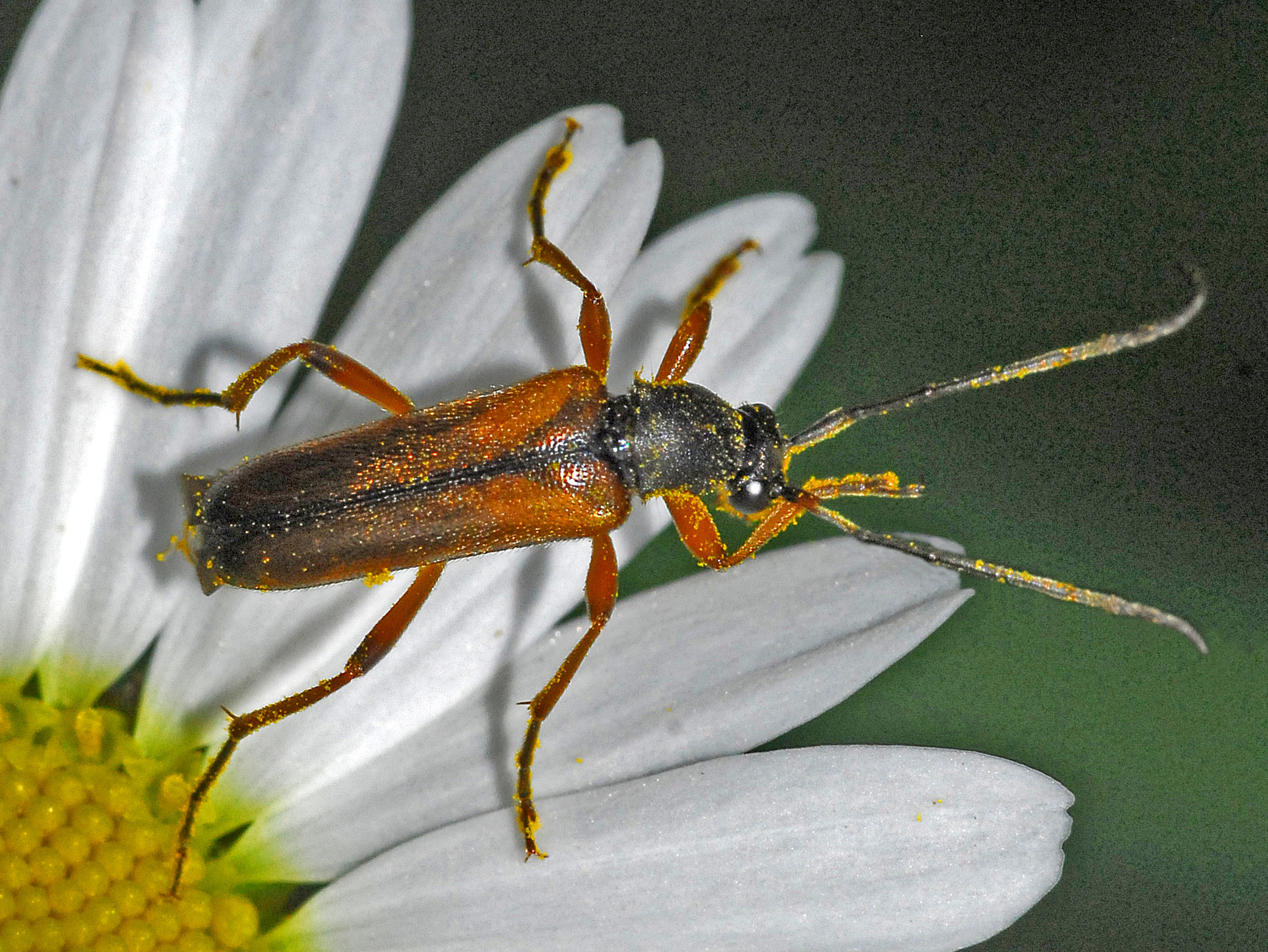
- Adult of Alosterna tabacicolor

Scientific classification
- Kingdom: Animalia
- Phylum: Arthropoda
- Class: Insecta
- Order: Coleoptera
- Suborder: Polyphaga
- Infraorder: Cucujiformia
- Family: Cerambycidae
- Genus: Alosterna
- Species: A. tabacicolor

Binomial name
- Alosterna tabacicolor (De Geer, 1775)

Synonyms
- List: Alosterna bicoloripes Pic, 1914; Leptura tabacicolor De Geer, 1775; Allosterna tabacicolor (DeGeer, 1775); Alosterna tabacicola (DeGeer, 1775; Grammoptera laevis (Fabricius, 1792); Grammoptera tabacicolor (DeGeer, 1775); Leptura chrysomeloides Schrank, 1781; Leptura genii Gmelin, 1790; Leptura laevis Fabricius, 1792 nec Herbst, 1784; Leptura solstitialis Herbst, 1784

= Alosterna tabacicolor =

Species of beetle

Alosterna tabacicolor, the tobacco-coloured longhorn beetle, is a species of beetle in family Cerambycidae.

== Subspecies ==
Subspecies include:

- Alosterna tabacicolor erythropus (Gebler, 1841)
- Alosterna tabacicolor sachalinensis Danilevsky, 2012
- Alosterna tabacicolor subvittata Reitter, 1885
- Alosterna tabacicolor tabacicolor (DeGeer, 1775)
- Alosterna tabacicolor tenebris Danilevsky, 2012
- Alosterna tabacicolor tokatensis Pic, 1901

== Distribution and habitat ==
This species is present in the Palearctic. In Europe in can be found in Austria, Belgium, Bulgaria, Croatia, the Czech Republic, Estonia, Finland, France, Germany, Greece, Hungary, Italy, Latvia, Lithuania, Luxembourg, Norway, Romania, Russia, Serbia, Slovakia, Slovenia, Spain, Sweden and United Kingdom. In Asia it can be found in Armenia, Azerbaijan, China, Georgia, Iran, Japan, Kazakhstan, Mongolia, North Korea and Turkey. These beetles occur from the plains to the lower mountain ranges, especially in forests. In the southern Alps they also live in higher areas.

== Description ==
Alosterna tabacicolor can reach a body length of about 6–10 mm (0.24–0.39 in). These graceful longhorn beetles are slender, the head, the pronotum and the upper part of the elytra are dark in color, while the remaining part of the elytra are brown-yellow and the sides are darkened. The pronotum is longer than it is wide, the sides are concave and curved inward. Elytra are finely haired. The legs of these beetles are brown-yellow, the ends of the thighs are rarely dark in color.

== Biology ==
Adults of Alosterna tabacicolor feed on flowers of Apiaceae and Aruncus dioicus in well wooded areas. The flight time lasts from April to July, but adults of these beetles can be found especially in July. The life cycle lasts two years. The larvae mainly live in the bark of Quercus robur, but also in extremely decayed wood of deciduous trees (elm, oak, maple, willow, hazel, hornbeam and birch). Exceptionally, the development also takes place in coniferous species such as spruce or pine.

== Bibliography ==
- This article has been expanded using, inter alia, material based on a translation of an article from the Deutsch Wikipedia, by the same name.
- Adolf Horion: Faunistik der mitteleuropäischen Käfer, Band XII: Cerambycidae – Bockkäfer. Überlingen, 1974 (in German)
- Bernhard Klausnitzer / Friedrich Sander: Die Bockkäfer Mitteleuropas. Die Neue Brehm-Bücherei 499. A. Ziemsen Verlag, DDR Wittenberg Lutherstadt, 1981, ISSN 0138-1423 (in German)
- Jiři Zahradnik, Irmgard Jung, Dieter Jung et al.: Käfer Mittel- und Nordwesteuropas. Parey, Berlin 1985, ISBN 3-490-27118-1. (in German)
- The national key to Sweden's flora and fauna. Beetles: Longhorn beetles Coleoptera: Cerambycidae. 2007. ArtDatabanken, SLU, Uppsala, ISBN 978-91-88506-62-7 (in Swedish)
