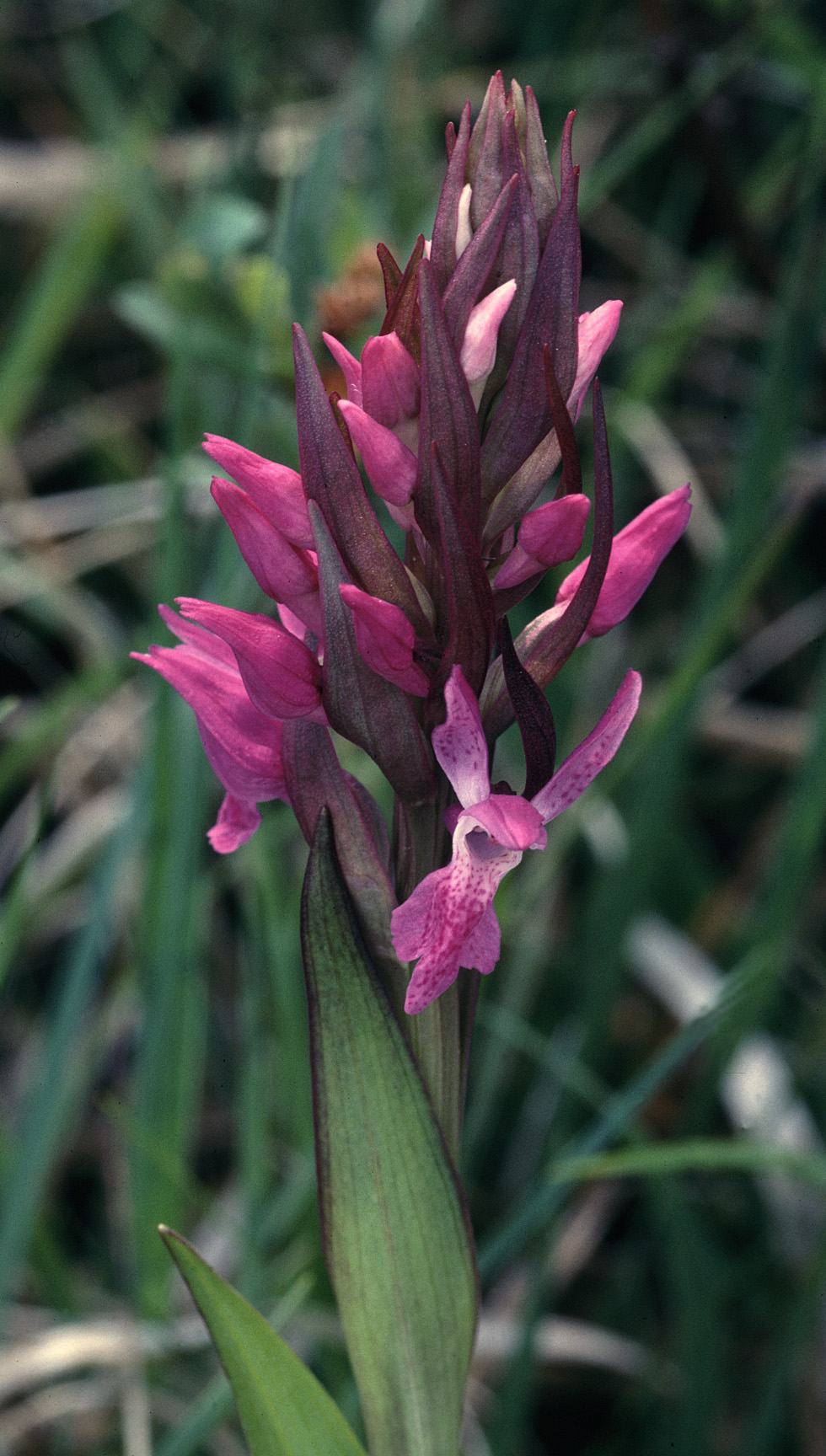
- Dactylorhiza francis-drucei subsp. traunsteinerioides

Scientific classification
- Kingdom: Plantae
- Clade: Tracheophytes
- Clade: Angiosperms
- Clade: Monocots
- Order: Asparagales
- Family: Orchidaceae
- Subfamily: Orchidoideae
- Genus: Dactylorhiza
- Species: D. francis-drucei

Binomial name
- Dactylorhiza francis-drucei (Wilmott) Aver. (1984)

Subspecies and varieties
- 3; see text

Synonyms
- Dactylorhiza majalis var. francis-drucei (Wilmott) R.M.Bateman & Denholm (1983); Dactylorhiza traunsteineri subsp. francis-drucei (Wilmott) Soó (1962); Dactylorhiza traunsteinerioides subsp. francis-drucei (Wilmott) R.M.Bateman & Denholm (2012); Dactylorhiza traunsteinerioides var. francis-drucei (Wilmott) F.M.Vázquez (2008); Orchis francis-drucei Wilmott (1936)

= Dactylorhiza francis-drucei =

Species of orchid

Dactylorhiza francis-drucei is a species of terrestrial orchid native to Great Britain and Ireland.

Three subspecies and varieties are accepted.

- Dactylorhiza francis-drucei var. ebudensis (Wief. ex R.M.Bateman & Denholm) R.M.Bateman & Denholm – North Uist
- Dactylorhiza francis-drucei subsp. francis-drucei – western Scotland
- Dactylorhiza francis-drucei subsp. traunsteinerioides (Pugsley) R.M.Bateman & Denholm – Ireland, northern Wales, and northern England

The species is tetraploid.
