= Johannes Christoph Klinge =

Baltic-German botanist

Johannes Christoph Klinge (1851–1902) was a Baltic-German botanist from the Russian Empire.

He has described the following taxon:

- Aerides siamensis Klinge
