= List of local nature reserves in Greater London =

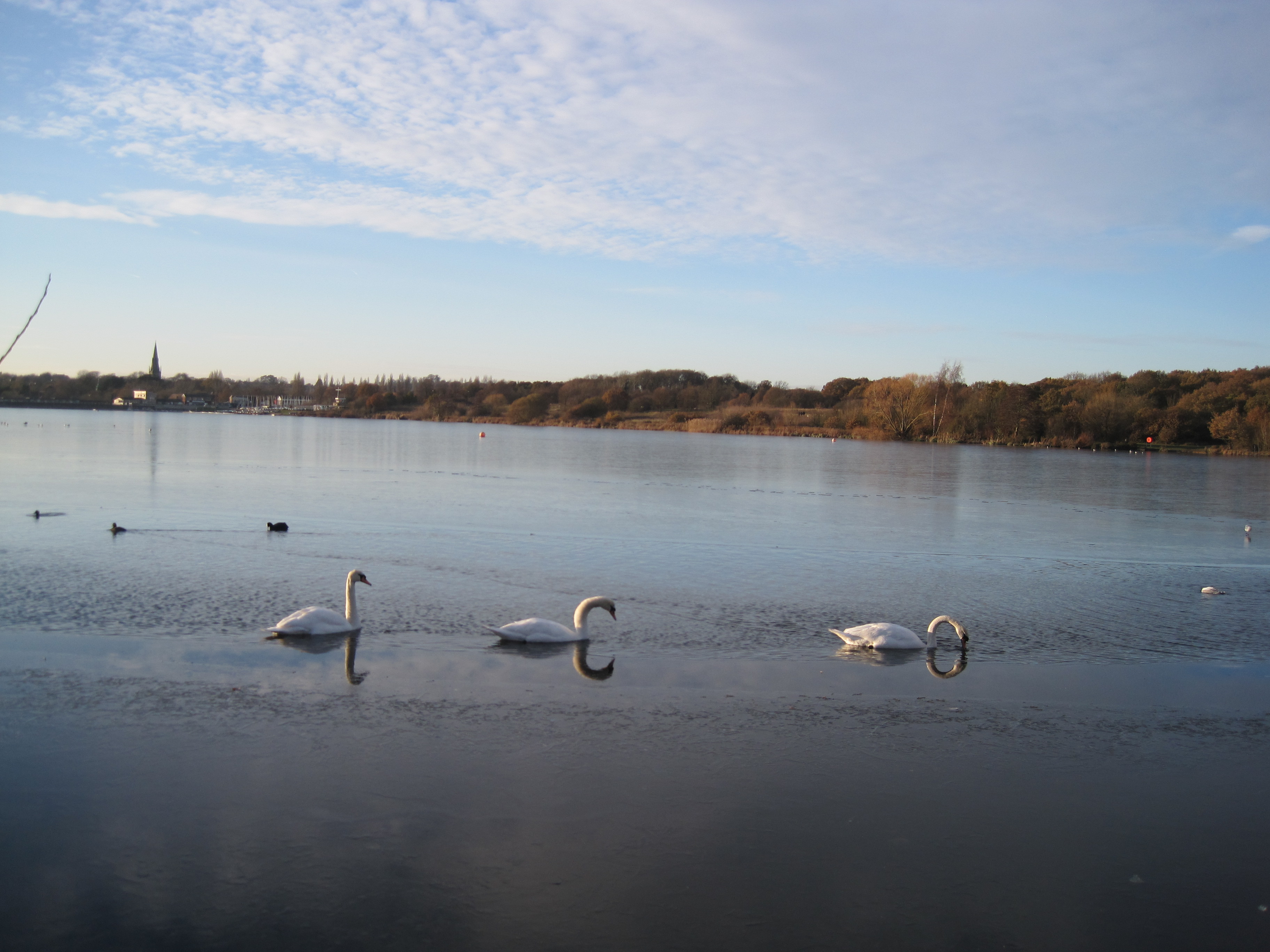
Brent Reservoir

Greater London is one of the largest urban areas in Europe, with an area of 1,572 km^{2} (607 sq mi). Its boundaries were set in 1965 when Greater London, which covers the 32 London boroughs and the City of London, was created. Almost two-thirds of it is green space and wetlands. Its population according to the 2011 census was 8.17 million.

Local nature reserve (LNR) is a statutory designation by local authorities which gives protection to wildlife habitats and natural features. It allows local authorities to apply local bye-laws to manage and protect sites. The local authority must have a legal interest in the site, by owning or leasing it or having a nature reserve agreement with the owner. As of January 2016, Natural England gives details of 144 local nature reserves declared by local authorities in Greater London, which are listed below. (Note: As of August 2024, there are 153 London LNRs, but the list has not been fully updated since 2016.)

The largest site, at 97.31 hectares (240.5 acres), is Brent Reservoir, most of which is a Site of Special Scientific Interest for its breeding wetland birds, especially great crested grebes, and for its marsh plant life. The smallest is Burnt Ash Pond at 0.13 hectares (0.32 acres), an old farm pond in the middle of a residential area. The longest is Parkland Walk, a linear site of 7.2 kilometres (4.5 miles) along the route of an old railway line. Perivale Wood is one of the oldest nature reserves in Britain. It has been managed by the Selborne Society since 1902, and was designated an LNR in 1974. The newest LNRs are Coldfall Wood, Alexandra Palace and Park and Masons Field, all declared in 2013. Several sites, including Camley Street Natural Park in Kings Cross and Frays Valley, are managed by the London Wildlife Trust.

== Sites ==
Site	Photograph	Area (Note: Unless specified otherwise, the area is taken from the Natural England map of each site. (Click on the identify icon (i) in the "Feature Tools" and then click on the site.)	Location (Note: The location is taken from the Natural England details page for the site)	Map (Note: Unless specified otherwise, the maps are on the Natural England database of local nature reserves.)	Details (Note: Details are on the pages on each site in the Natural England database of local nature reserves.)	Other classifications	Free public access (Note: Free public access to all or most of the site)	Description
Abney Park Cemetery	Abney Park Cemetery	12.54 hectares (31.0 acres)	Hackney; 51.564°N 0.077°W; TQ 334 868	Map	Details		Yes	This is one of London's Magnificent Seven cemeteries. It was closed to burials in 1978 and is now managed as a nature reserve.
Ackroyd Drive Greenlink	Ackroyd Drive Greenlink	0.87 hectares (2.1 acres)	Tower Hamlets; 51.519°N 0.023°W; TQ 368 818	Map	Details		Yes	The Greenlink is a green corridor between Tower Hamlets Cemetery and Mile End Park.
Adelaide	Adelaide Nature Reserve	0.90 hectares (2.2 acres)	Camden; 51.543°N 0.161°W; TQ 276 843	Map	Details		Public access at limited times	This nature reserve slopes down to a railway line. It is mainly neutral grassland, with areas of scrub and woodland.
Ainslie Wood	Path in Ainslie Wood	2.06 hectares (5.1 acres)	Waltham Forest; 51.611°N 0.011°W; TQ 378 921	Map	Details		Yes	This is ancient woodland which has mature oaks and wild service trees. It is known locally as Bluebell Wood on account of its spring display.
Alexandra Palace and Park	Alexandra Park	62.66 hectares (154.8 acres)	Haringey; 51.594°N 0.130°W; TQ 296 900	Map	Details		Yes	The park has a wide range of habitats for an urban area, and is particularly noted for its varied bird species.
Anton Crescent Wetland	Anton Crescent Wetland	1.04 hectares (2.6 acres)	Sutton; 51.372°N 0.203°W; TQ 252 652	Map	Details		No	The wetland is used as a flood storage area by the Environment Agency. It has open water, reed beds and willow trees.
Barnes Common	Cytisus scoparius Broom (shrub) on Barnes Common	41.68 hectares (103.0 acres)	Richmond; 51.470°N 0.238°W; TQ 225 760	Map	Details		Yes	The common is mainly wooded, with areas of grassland. London plane, lime and horse-chestnut trees were planted in the late nineteenth century
Barnsbury Wood	Barnsbury Wood	0.32 hectares (0.79 acres)	Islington; 51.542°N 0.115°W; TQ 308 842	Map	Details		Public access at limited times	The wood was the garden of a vicarage. It is mainly sycamore, ash and lime.
Battersea Park Nature Areas	Nature area in Battersea Park	2.90 hectares (7.2 acres)	Wandsworth; 51.480°N 0.151°W; TQ 285 773; 51.481°N 0.149°W; TQ 286 774	Map	Details		Yes	The nature areas have mixed woodland and scrub, four glades and a pond. There are twenty species of butterflies.
Beam Valley	River Beam in Beam Valley Country Park	39.29 hectares (97.1 acres)	Barking and Dagenham; 51.538°N 0.173°E; TQ 508 844	Map	Details		Yes	A park on the bank the River Beam. Historic features include tanks traps and pillboxes.
Beam Valley (Environment Agency)	Beam Valley	11.86 hectares (29.3 acres)	Barking and Dagenham; 51.538°N 0.173°E; TQ 508 844	Map	Details		Yes	Part of Beam Valley is owned by the Environment Agency, and it has been designated a separate LNR.
Beckenham Place Park	Beckenham Place Park	95.14 hectares (235.1 acres)	Lewisham; 51.418°N 0.012°W; TQ 383 707	Map	Details		Yes	The park has extensive ancient woodland, diverse acid grassland, a natural stretch of river and an old pond.
Bedfont Lakes Country Park	Bedfont Lakes Country Park lake	31.59 hectares (78.1 acres)	Hounslow; 51.443°N 0.449°W; TQ 079 727	Map	Details		Yes	The park has lakes created from a former landfill site, together with areas of grass and woodland.
Bedfords Park	Sunset over the pond at Bedfords Park	106.35 hectares (262.8 acres) (Note: The map is missing for Bedfords Park. In this case the area and map is taken from the Greenspace Information for Greater London database.)	Havering; 51.608°N 0.192°E; TQ 519 922	Map	Details	Essex Wildlife Trust	Yes	This site has wildflower meadows, diverse woodland, several ponds and a lake, as well as a herd of red deer.
Belmont Pastures	Belmont Pastures	1.26 hectares (3.1 acres)	Sutton; 51.346°N 0.199°W; TQ 255 623	Map	Details		Yes	The pastures are grassland and scrub, and they have a wide variety of crickets, butterflies and grasshoppers.
Belsize Wood	Path in Belsize Wood	0.27 hectares (0.67 acres)	Camden; 51.553°N 0.164°W; TQ 274 854	Map	Details		Free public access to part of the site	This is a sloping wooded site with mature oak trees. It has a wide variety of insect species.
Bennett's Hole	Bennett's Hole and River Wandle	1.22 hectares (3.0 acres)	Merton; 51.391°N 0.170°W; TQ 274 674	Map	Details		Yes	Diverse habitats including woodland, marsh and scrub. The north has a variety of tree species, and the south has mainly crack willows and oaks.
Bentley Priory	Summerhouse Lake in Bentley Priory LNR	59.25 hectares (146.4 acres)	Harrow; 51.621°N 0.332°W; TQ 156 927	Map	Details	SSSI	Yes	This is a Site of Special Scientific Interest, principally for its meadows. It also has extensive woods and two ponds.
Big Wood and Little Wood	Path in Big Wood, N2	8.29 hectares (20.5 acres)	Barnet; 51.583°N 0.190°W; TQ 255 887; 51.586°N 0.193°W; TQ 253 890	Map	Details		Yes	These two small woods are the remnants of the forest which once covered north London. It has birds rarely seen in London, such as the green woodpecker.
Blondin Park, Northfields	Blondin Park	2.34 hectares (5.8 acres)	Ealing; 51.495°N 0.320°W; TQ 167 787	Map	Details		Yes	The nature area of this park has a pond, an orchard and a wildflower meadow.
Bonesgate Open Space	Bonesgate Open Space	5.07 hectares (12.5 acres)	Kingston; 51.361°N 0.291°W; TQ 191 638	Map	Details		Yes	This is a path along the bank of the Bonesgate Stream. It is parkland with areas of hazel, and has a wide variety of breeding birds.
Bramley Bank	Bramley Bank	10.30 hectares (25.5 acres)	Croydon; 51.354°N 0.058°W; TQ 353 634	Map	Details	London Wildlife Trust	Yes	Bramley Bank has oak and ash woodland with a large pond, and areas of acidic grassland.
Brent Reservoir/Welsh Harp	The northern arm of the Brent Reservoir	97.31 hectares (240.5 acres)	Barnet Brent; 51.571°N 0.245°W; TQ 217 873	Map	Details	SSSI	Yes	Most of the site is a Site of Special Scientific Interest, especially for its large number of breeding birds, including the great crested grebe.
Brookmill Road	Brookmill Road Local Nature Reserve	0.44 hectares (1.1 acres)	Lewisham; 51.468°N 0.020°W; TQ 376 762	Map	Details		No	A steeply sloping disused railway embankment. It is woodland, with the main trees being hornbeam and hazel.
Burnt Ash Pond	Burnt Ash Pond	0.13 hectares (0.32 acres)	Lewisham; 51.441°N 0.020°E; TQ 405 733	Map	Details		No	A small pond in the middle of houses, which has an extensive variety of aquatic animals, including many breeding toads, and plants, including great and hoary willowherb.
Camley Street Natural Park	A pond in Camley Street Nature Park	0.84 hectares (2.1 acres)	Camden; 51.535°N 0.129°W; TQ 299 834	Map	Details	London Wildlife Trust	Yes	This nature reserve on the bank of Regents Canal in Kings Cross has ponds and areas of meadows and woodland, with birds such as reed warblers and kingfishers.
Cannon Hill Common	Cannon Hill Common	14.16 hectares (35.0 acres)	Merton; 51.400°N 0.222°W; TQ 238 683	Map	Details		Yes	The common has meadows with plants such as meadow barley and meadow foxtail, and woodland dominated by ancient oak trees.
Castle Hill	Castle Hill	3.48 hectares (8.6 acres)	Kingston; 51.358°N 0.291°W; TQ 191 635	Map	Details	Scheduled monument	Yes	This is the site of a medieval hunting lodge. It is woodland mainly of oak and hazel, with varied ground flora, including wood anemone and hairy St John's-wort.
The Chase - Barking	River Rom in The Chase Nature Reserve	44.15 hectares (109.1 acres)	Barking and Dagenham; 51.550°N 0.184°E; TQ 515 857	Map	Details		Yes	The Chase is a footpath along the River Rom. It has diverse habitats and wildlife includes water voles.
The Chase - Havering	The Chase Nature Reserve	1.39 hectares (3.4 acres)	Havering; 51.558°N 0.184°E; TQ 515 866	Map	Details		Yes	This is a continuation of The Chase in Barking. It has black poplar trees.
Cherry Wood	Cherry Wood	1.76 hectares (4.3 acres)	Merton; 51.397°N 0.215°W; TQ 243 680	Map	Details		Yes	The main trees are pedunculate oak, ash and horse chestnut. There are over twenty-five species of birds.
Chiswick Eyot	Chiswick Eyot channel at low tide	0.83 hectares (2.1 acres)	Hounslow; 51.487°N 0.246°W; TQ 219 779	Map	Details		No	This is a small wooded island in the Thames. The main trees are willows, and the island is surrounded by reed beds.
Coldfall Wood	Coldfall Wood	13.43 hectares (33.2 acres)	Haringey; 51.597°N 0.162°W; TQ 274 903	Map	Details		Yes	This is ancient woodland, mainly of hornbeam, oak, birch and sycamore. There are a number of ground plants which are rare in London, such as pale sedge, trailing St John's wort and lady-fern.
Coombe Hill Wood	Coombe Hill Wood	2.19 hectares (5.4 acres)	Kingston; 51.419°N 0.251°W; TQ 217 703	Map	Details		Yes	This wood is mainly oak, with an understorey of hazel coppice.
Coppetts Wood and Glebelands	Coppett's Wood	20.00 hectares (49.4 acres)	Barnet; 51.609°N 0.159°W; TQ 276 916; 51.604°N 0.170°W; TQ 268 910	Map	Details		Yes	Coppett's Wood is mainly oak and hornbeam, and has a number of rare insects. Glebelands is a remnant of Finchley Common, and has woodland and ponds.
Covert Way	Path in Covert Way	6.77 hectares (16.7 acres)	Enfield; 51.660°N 0.173°W; TQ 265 973	Map	Details		Yes	Covert Way is deciduous woodland. Animals include muntjac deer, green and greater spotted woodpeckers, and white-letter and purple hair-streak butterflies.
Crane Park Island	Crane Park Island	2.67 hectares (6.6 acres)	Richmond; 51.442°N 0.379°W; TQ 128 727	Map	Details	London Wildlife Trust	Yes	This is an island in the River Crane. It has wet woodland, grassland and reed beds and fauna include kingfishers and water voles.
Cranebank, Hatton	Cranebank meadow	6.69 hectares (16.5 acres)	Hounslow; 51.476°N 0.416°W; TQ 101 764	Map	Details		Yes	Cranebank is flood meadows by the River Crane, which are under water in winter. There are twenty-six species of butterflies and twelve of damselflies and dragonflies.
Cranham Brickfields	Pond in Cranham Brickfields	8.69 hectares (21.5 acres)	Havering; 51.564°N 0.278°E; TQ 580 875	Map	Details		Yes	Cranham Brickfields has pasture, a pond, scrub and woodland. Invertebrates include the great crested newt and slowworm, and plants dyer's greenweed.
Cranham Marsh	Cranham Marsh	12.97 hectares (32.0 acres)	Havering; 51.547°N 0.263°E; TQ 570 855	Map	Details	Essex Wildlife Trust	Yes	This site's habitats include marshes, ponds and ancient woodland, and a tributary of the River Markyke runs through the site.
Cranmer Green	Cranmer Green	3.22 hectares (8.0 acres)	Merton; 51.398°N 0.163°W; TQ 279 681	Map	Details		Yes	The green has a pond, woodland and grassland. The pond is probably late eighteenth century in origin.
Crossness	Crossness Nature Reserve	25.50 hectares (63.0 acres)	Bexley; 51.501°N 0.148°E; TQ 492 802	Map	Details		Free public access to part of the site	This is a network of open water and ditches, with areas of rough grassland. There are over one hundred and thirty species of birds.
Cuddington Meadows	Cuddington Meadows	1.39 hectares (3.4 acres)	Sutton; 51.334°N 0.214°W; TQ 245 610	Map	Details		Yes	Cuddington Meadows is chalk grassland, and its most important feature is the variety of flowering plants. Sixteen butterfly species have been recorded.
Dacres Wood	Dacres Wood Local Nature Reserve	0.70 hectares (1.7 acres)	Lewisham; 51.432°N 0.052°W; TQ 355 721	Map	Details		Public access at limited times	The wood has some massive turkey oaks, and ornamental shrubs which are probably inherited from a time when it was a Victorian garden. There are also marshes and a pond.
Dagenham Village Churchyard	Dagenham Village Churchyard	0.87 hectares (2.1 acres)	Barking and Dagenham; 51.539°N 0.162°E; TQ 500 845	Map	Details		Yes	The old gravestones and walls in the churchyard provide a habitat for lichens and mosses, and woodpeckers feed in an avenue of lime trees.
Danson Park Bog Garden, Welling	Footbridge in Danson Park	1.07 hectares (2.6 acres)	Bexley; 51.454°N 0.114°E; TQ 470 749	Map	Details		Yes	Danson Park has a large lake, and a marshy area at its western end has been converted into a nature reserve.
Denham Country Park	The River Colne in Denham Country Park	19.82 hectares (49.0 acres)	Hillingdon Buckinghamshire; 51.574°N 0.485°W; TQ 051 872	Map	Details		Yes	Three rivers go through the park, the Colne, the Misbourne and the Frays. Birds include herons and kingfishers.
Derwent Floodwash	Derwent Floodwash	1.83 hectares (4.5 acres)	Merton; 51.392°N 0.226°W; TQ 235 674	Map	Details		Yes	This is designed to store water during flooding of Pyl Brook, to prevent flooding downstream. It is wet grassland with a number of uncommon plant species.
Devonshire Avenue Nature Area	Devonshire Avenue Nature Area	0.42 hectares (1.0 acre)	Sutton; 51.354°N 0.189°W; TQ 262 632	Map	Details		Yes	This is mainly chalk grassland. It has the locally rare small blueall blue butterfly, and the butterfly's food plant, kidney vetch.
Downham Woodland Walk	Downham Woodland Walk	2.82 hectares (7.0 acres)	Lewisham; 51.430°N 0.002°E; TQ 393 720	Map	Details		Yes	The walk is ancient woodland. Trees include pedunculate oaks, hornbeams and field maples, and there are invertebrates such as stag and fungus beetles.
Duke's Hollow	Duke's Hollow	0.27 hectares (0.67 acres)	Hounslow; 51.473°N 0.256°W; TQ 212 763	Map	Details		Yes	Duke's Hollow slopes steeply down towards the Thames. It is woodland mainly of willow.
Dulwich Upper Wood	Dulwich Upper Wood	1.74 hectares (4.3 acres)	Southwark; 51.424°N 0.078°W; TQ 337 712	Map	Details		Yes	This is a remnant of the Great North Wood. It is mainly oak, and animals include stag beetles and bats.
Eastbrookend Country Park	Bardag Lake in Eastbrookend Country Park	67.39 hectares (166.5 acres)	Barking and Dagenham; 51.552°N 0.177°E; TQ 510 860	Map	Details		Yes	The park is former derelict land planted with 50,000 small trees, and with grass and flower seeds suitable for poor soil.
Edith Gardens	Entrance to Edith Gardens	0.44 hectares (1.1 acres)	Kingston; 51.389°N 0.284°W; TQ 195 669	Map	Details		No	The site is abandoned allotments next to Tolworth Brook. Most of it is low diversity grassland, and there is also a thicket of young elms areas of brambles and some large mature trees.
Elmbridge Open Space (Note: The coordinates and description in the details page for Hogsmill River Park in the Natural England database put it in the same location as Elmbridge Open Space (the northern half of Hogsmill River Park) and Southwood Open Space (the southern half). The map for Hogsmill River Park wrongly shows a small closed wood called Hogsmill Wood. The two maps in this table for Hogsmill River Park are those of Elmbridge and Southwood, and area shown for Hogsmill is the total area of its two halves.)	Elmbridge Open Space	9.35 hectares (23.1 acres)	Kingston; 51.392°N 0.274°W; TQ 202 673	Map	Details		Yes	A green walk along the bank of the Hogsmill River. There are willow trees by the river bank and plants such as meadowsweet and comfrey.
Fishpond Wood and Beverley Meads	Fishpond Wood	5.92 hectares (14.6 acres)	Merton; 51.422°N 0.248°W; TQ 219 707	Map	Details	London Wildlife Trust.	Yes	Fishpond Wood has wetlands and oak and hazel woodlands, while Beverley Meads is a mosaic of woods and pastures.
Foots Cray Meadows	River Cray in Foots Cray Meadows	30.32 hectares (74.9 acres)	Bexley; 51.425°N 0.124°E; TQ 478 717	Map	Details		Yes	The River Cray runs through the meadows. They have a diverse landscape, including ancient woodlands and wildflower meadows.
Fox Wood	Fox Wood	2.25 hectares (5.6 acres)	Ealing; 51.526°N 0.299°W; TQ 181 822	Map	Details		Yes	Fox Wood was a reservoir which was drained in World War II to stop it being used as a navigational aid by German bombers. It is now sloping woodland.
Foxley Wood	Foxley Wood	11.36 hectares (28.1 acres)	Croydon; 51.328°N 0.114°W; TQ 315 605	Map	Details		Yes	Foxley Wood has chalk grassland and woods. There are badgers and roe deer, and over forty species of birds have been observed.
Frays Valley	Frays River in Frays Farm Meadows	71.87 hectares (177.6 acres)	Hillingdon; 51.568°N 0.479°W; TQ 055 865	Map	Details	London Wildlife Trust, SSSI	Yes	The Frays River goes through the wildlife rich valley. Flora include kingcups and ragged robin, and there are mammals such as harvest mice and water voles.
Fryent Country Park	Barn Hill Pond in Fryent Country Park	106.97 hectares (264.3 acres)	Brent; 51.574°N 0.277°W; TQ 195 875	Map	Details		Yes	The park has a varied landscape, including lakes, woodland and meadows. Over 800 species have been recorded, including 80 birds and 21 butterflies.
Gillespie Park	Gillespie Park pond	3.03 hectares (7.5 acres)	Islington; 51.559°N 0.107°W; TQ 313 862	Map	Details		Yes	Gillespie Park has an ecology centre, and it is mainly grassland. Bird species include reed bunting and song thrush, and there are also ponds with many invertebrates.
Grove Farm	Grove Farm, Ealing	8.07 hectares (19.9 acres)	Ealing; 51.554°N 0.341°W; TQ 151 852	Map	Details		Yes	Grove Farm has ancient woodland with wild service trees and a variety of wild flowers.
Grove Park Nature Reserve	Grove Park Nature Reserve	2.74 hectares (6.8 acres)	Lewisham; 51.437°N 0.016°E; TQ 402 729	map	Details		Yes	Grove Park Nature Reserve contains native woodland, calcareous grassland meadow, a small stream and pond, slow worms, stag beetles, Desmond Tutu Peace Pole
Gunnersbury Triangle	Pond dipping at Gunnersbury Triangle	2.57 hectares (6.4 acres)	Hounslow Ealing; 51.494°N 0.271°W; TQ 201 786	Map	Details	London Wildlife Trust	Yes	This has a varied habitat, including woodland and marshes. It has amphibians such as toads, newts and frogs.
Hainault Lodge	Hainault Lodge	5.60 hectares (13.8 acres)	Redbridge; 51.607°N 0.130°E; TQ 476 919	Map	Details		No	Hainault Lodge is ancient woodland and pasture. Butterflies include orange tips and speckled woods, and birds long-tailed tits, robins.
Ham Common	Latchmere Stream in Ham Common	40.27 hectares (99.5 acres)	Richmond; 51.432°N 0.298°W; TQ 184 718	Map	Details		Yes	The main trees in Ham Common are birch and oak, and there are also areas of acid grassland.
Ham Lands	Ham Lands	60.01 hectares (148.3 acres)	Richmond; 51.435°N 0.325°W; TQ 165 720	Map	Details		Yes	This is a former gravel quarry filled with soil types from across London, thus creating an unusual mosaic of habitats.
High Elms	Cuckoo Wood in High Elms	102.33 hectares (252.9 acres)	Bromley; 51.346°N 0.072°E; TQ 444 628	Map	Details	SSSI	Yes	Most of this country park is secondary woodland, but it retains much of the original ground flora with some rare species.
Hogsmill River Park	Hogsmill River Park	22.26 hectares (55.0 acres)	Kingston; 51.398°N 0.276°W; TQ 200 680; 51.383°N 0.264°W; TQ 209 663	Map; Map	Details		Yes	A linear park along the Hogsmill River. The landscape is varied, with pasture and mature willow and oak woodland.
Hounslow Heath	Hounslow Heath	83.14 hectares (205.4 acres)	Hounslow; 51.457°N 0.385°W; TQ 123 743	Map	Details		Yes	The heath has extensive acid grassland with some hay meadows, marsh and woodland.
Hutchinson's Bank	Hutchinson's Bank	21.77 hectares (53.8 acres)	Croydon; 51.337°N 0.019°W; TQ 381 616	Map	Details	London Wildlife Trust	Yes	Hutchinson's Bank is a sloping meadow bank, with a diverse ecology including pyramidal and common spotted orchids and the rare greater yellow-rattle.
Ingrebourne Valley	Ingrebourne Valley	146.62 hectares (362.3 acres)	Havering; 51.535°N 0.207°E; TQ 532 841; 51.524°N 0.197°E; TQ 525 828	Map	Details	Essex Wildlife Trust, SSSI	Yes	The site has a wide range of habitats, rough grassland, woodland, marshes, river, reedbeds and wet grazing. There are fauna such as great crested newts, slowworms and harvest mice.
Isleworth Ait	Isleworth Ait	3.49 hectares (8.6 acres)	Hounslow; 51.468°N 0.320°W; TQ 168 757	Map	Details	London Wildlife Trust	No	This is an island in the Thames. It has poplar and willow woodland on land which is often flooded. Rare species include the two-lipped door snail and the German hairy snail.
Islip Manor Meadows	Islip Manor Meadows	23.75 hectares (58.7 acres)	Ealing; 51.548°N 0.388°W; TQ 119 845	Map	Details		Yes	This is a diverse wet meadow site with over twenty grass and ten leguminous species. There are ponds with the protected great crested newt.
Jubilee Country Park	Path in Jubilee Country Park	28.67 hectares (70.8 acres)	Bromley; 51.393°N 0.063°E; TQ 436 680	Map	Details		Yes	The park has chalk grassland and woods with oaks, hawthorns and field maples. Some species are rare in London.
Jubilee Wood	Jubilee Wood	2.24 hectares (5.5 acres)	Kingston; 51.343°N 0.327°W; TQ 166 618	Map (Note: Jubilee Wood is in two parts separated by an electricity substation. The Natural England map incorrectly shows the western wood as the LNR. Kingston Council's own map of LNRs and a notice on the site shows the eastern wood as the LNR.)	Details		Yes	Trees in this wood include birch, pedunculate oak, field maple, goat willow and wych elm.
Kempton	Kempton Nature Reserve	22.80 hectares (56.3 acres)	Hounslow; 51.424°N 0.393°W; TQ 118 707	Map	Details	SSSI	No	This site is disused reservoirs which has many bird species. It is of national importance for wintering gadwall. It also has feeding bats and mammals include water voles.
Lavender Pond	Lavender Pond	0.70 hectares (1.7 acres)	Southwark; 51.505°N 0.038°W; TQ 363 803	Map	Details		Free public access to part of the site	This used to be part of the Surrey Commercial Docks, now converted to a small wildlife pond.
Lesnes Abbey Woods	Lesnes Abbey Woods	73.13 hectares (180.7 acres)	Bexley; 51.486°N 0.132°E; TQ 481 785	Map	Details	SSSI	Yes	This site has ancient woodland, parkland, heath, wetland and hedgerows. A survey found 906 invertebrate species, 46 birds, 12 mammals, 59 fungi and 292 plants.
Litten	Litten Local Nature Reserve	10.7 hectares (26 acres)	Ealing; 51.532°N 0.351°W; TQ 145 827	Map	Details		Yes	Litten has a pond, woodland and a wildflower meadow.
Long Wood	Long Wood	1.20 hectares (3.0 acres)	Ealing; 51.497°N 0.338°W; TQ 155 789	Map	Details		Yes	This is ancient woodland which has varied tree and wildlife species.
Lonsdale Road Reservoir (Leg of Mutton Reservoir)	Lonsdale Road Reservoir	8.19 hectares (20.2 acres)	Richmond; 51.482°N 0.247°W; TQ 218 774	Map	Details		Yes	This disused reservoir has a wide variety of water birds, including tufted ducks and wigeons.
Lower Wandle	Lower Wandle River	2.52 hectares (6.2 acres)	Merton; 51.433°N 0.192°W; TQ 258 720	Map	Details		Yes	This is a stretch of the River Wandle, which is lined with mature trees, grassland and patches of herbs.
The Manor	Dagnam Park in The Manor Nature Reserve	67.96 hectares (167.9 acres)	Havering; 51.614°N 0.237°E TQ 550 930 51.608°N 0.244°E TQ 555 923	Map	Details		Yes	The Manor comprises several parks and diverse habitats. Plants include the common spotted-orchid and square stemmed St John's wort.
Maryon Wilson Park and Gilbert's Pit (including Maryon Park)	Maryon Park	17.52 hectares (43.3 acres)	Greenwich; 51.487°N 0.042°E; TQ 419 784	Map	Details	SSSI	Yes	Gilbert's Pit is a geological SSSI. Maryon Wilson Park is a hilly wooded site, which has a stream with rare plants. Maryon Park is acid grassland, scrub and secondary woodland.
Masons Field	Masons Field	2.87 hectares (7.1 acres)	Brent; 51.5833°N 0.27367240°W; TQ 197 886	Map	Details		Yes	This is a former London Underground sports ground next to Fryent Country Park, which has been converted to a wildflower meadow.
Mayesbrook Park South	Mayesbrook Park lake	7.55 hectares (18.7 acres)	Barking and Dagenham; 51.540°N 0.108°E; TQ 463 844	Map	Details		Yes	The park has a nature reserve with two large lakes, rough grassland and woodland.
Merton Park Green Walks	Merton Park Green Walks	1.49 hectares (3.7 acres)	Merton; 51.412°N 0.200°W; TQ 253 697	Map	Details		Yes	This site has a variety of habitats, including grassland and an inaccessible area of elm scrub and brambles.
Morden Park	Morden Park	28.19 hectares (69.7 acres)	Merton; 51.393°N 0.212°W; TQ 245 675	Map	Details		Yes	This park has woodland with 300-year-old oak trees. Birds include coal tits and spotted flycatchers.
Mudchute Park and Farm	Mudchute Park Farm	13.31 hectares (32.9 acres)	Tower Hamlets; 51.492°N 0.012°W; TQ 381 789	Map	Details		Yes	This is a city farm and nature reserve, with varied habitats including wetlands. There are invertebrates such as smooth newts and slowworms.
Myrna Close	Myrna Close	0.75 hectares (1.9 acres)	Merton; 51.416°N 0.174°W; TQ 271 701	Map	Details		Yes	A linear park on the route of a former railway. It has a small stream and two ponds, and wetland plants include brooklime.
New Cross Gate Cutting (Brockley Nature Reserve)	A pond in Camley Street Nature Park	4.19 hectares (10.4 acres)	Lewisham; 51.470°N 0.039°W; TQ 363 764	Map	Details	London Wildlife Trust	No	This sloping railway cutting is mainly woodland with some areas of grassland, reeds and herbs. There are over 170 plant species, some unusual in the area.
Northolt Manor	Northolt Manor House moat	1.79 hectares (4.4 acres)	Ealing; 51.544°N 0.369°W; TQ 132 841	Map	Details	Scheduled Monument	Yes	This was a fourteenth century moated manor. It has wetland, scrub, woodland and grassland. The wetland has a wide range of species, such as thread-leaved water-crowfoot and narrow-fruited water-cress.
Nunhead Cemetery	Nunhead cemetery	20.23 hectares (50.0 acres)	Southwark; 51.462°N 0.052°W; TQ 354 755	Map	Details		Yes	This is one of London's Magnificent Seven cemeteries. It has a wide range of plants, and sixteen species of butterflies have been recorded.
Oak Avenue, Hampton	Oak Avenue Local Nature Reserve	1.85 hectares (4.6 acres)	Richmond; 51.428°N 0.388°W; TQ 122 711	Map	Details		Yes	This is former wasteland, where some new habitats have been created, including meadows and a pond, and others have grown up naturally.
Oak Hill Wood	Oak Hill Wood meadow with Oak Hill Park in the distance	9.88 hectares (24.4 acres)	Barnet; 51.640°N 0.151°W; TQ 280 951	Map	Details	London Wildlife Trust	Yes	This medieval oak wood has wild service trees, woodland flowers such as wood anemones and yellow archangels, and pipistrelle and brown long-eared bats.
Oakleigh Way	Oakleigh Way	0.64 hectares (1.6 acres)	Merton; 51.412°N 0.149°W; TQ 288 698	Map	Details		Yes	Oakleigh Way is a former railway depot converted to a nature reserve, which has birch woodland and wildflower meadows.
One Tree Hill	The Oak of Honour on One Tree Hill	6.95 hectares (17.2 acres)	Southwark; 51.451°N 0.051°W; TQ 355 743	Map	Details		Yes	Queen Elizabeth I is said to have picnicked under an oak at the top of the hill. It has many ancient trees.
Oxleas/Shooters Hill Woodlands	Path in Oxleas Wood	119.60 hectares (295.5 acres)	Greenwich; 51.469°N 0.057°E TQ 430 764 51.460°N 0.073°E TQ 441 755	Map	Details	SSSI	Yes	The woods have a wide variety of fungi and invertebrates, including the rare palmate newt. Oxleas Wood is over 8,000 years old.
Parkland Walk	Parkland Walk	14.31 hectares (35.4 acres)	Haringey Islington; 51.574°N 0.121°W; TQ 303 878	Map	Details		Yes	This is a 4.5 mile walk along the route of a former railway line. It has an area of acidic grassland with rare plants and insects.
Parsloes Park Squatts	Parsloes Park Squatts	4.28 hectares (10.6 acres)	Barking and Dagenham; 51.545°N 0.130°E; TQ 478 851	Map	Details		Yes	This is an area of neutral and acidic grassland in the park which has been set aside as a nature reserve. It has ancient hedgerows.
Perivale Wood	Perivale Wood	8.02 hectares (19.8 acres)	Ealing; 51.540°N 0.329°W; TQ 160 837	Map	Details		No	Perivale Wood is ancient woodland of oak and ash. It also has rough grassland, and ponds and streams.
Pevensey Road	Pevensey Road Nature Reserve	10.21 hectares (25.2 acres)	Hounslow; 51.448°N 0.390°W; TQ 120 733	Map	Details		Yes	This is an area of scrub, woodland and wetland next to the River Crane.
Pyl Brook	Pyl Brook	1.31 hectares (3.2 acres)	Merton; 51.387°N 0.202°W; TQ 252 669	Map	Details		Yes	This is a stretch of Pyl Brook and adjacent land. It is mainly mature hawthorn and elm scrub.
Queen's Wood	Queen's Wood	21.07 hectares (52.1 acres)	Haringey; 51.581°N 0.142°W; TQ 288 885	Map	Details		Yes	The wood is mainly oak and hornbeam. Over a hundred species of spider have been recorded.
Raeburn Open Space	Raeburn Open Space	5.00 hectares (12.4 acres)	Kingston; 51.393°N 0.280°W; TQ 198 674	Map	Details		Yes	The Tolworth Brook flows through this site, which has young woodland, old hedgerows and rough grassland.
Railway Fields	Pond in Railway Fields	0.87 hectares (2.1 acres)	Haringey; 51.576°N 0.101°W; TQ 317 881	Map	Details		Public access at limited times	Railway Fields has varied habitats, including a pond, marshland, a meadow and woodland. Over 200 species of wild flowers have been recorded.
Rainham Marshes	Cows graze in Rainham Marshes	79.19 hectares (195.7 acres)	Havering; 51.491°N 0.224°E; TQ 545 792	Map	Details	RSPB, SSSI	Yes	The grasslands on this site have rare plants, insects and birds, and a large population of water voles.
Ravensbury Park	Ravensbury Park	7.04 hectares (17.4 acres)	Merton; 51.397°N 0.180°W; TQ 267 680	Map	Details		Yes	The park is next to the River Wandle and it has wetland bird species such as kingfishers and grey wagtails, together with woodland areas.
Ripple Nature Reserve	Ripple Nature Reserve	3.68 hectares (9.1 acres)	Barking and Dagenham; 51.521°N 0.115°E; TQ 468 824	Map	Details		Yes	Much of the Ripple is damp grassland, while drier areas have rare species such as yellow vetchling. There are a number of scarce insect species including the emerald damselfly.
Rose Walk	Rose Walk	2.69 hectares (6.6 acres)	Kingston; 51.398°N 0.278°W; TQ 199 680	Map	Details		Yes	Unmanaged grassland with wild flowers. The main grasses are oat grass, tall fescue and rye-grass.
Roundshaw Downs	Roundshaw Downs	19.61 hectares (48.5 acres)	Sutton; 51.351°N 0.124°W; TQ 307 630	Map	Details		Yes	Roundshaw Downs is chalk downland and woodland which has a wide variety of bird species, including great spotted woodpeckers.
Rowley Green Common	Rowley Green Common	5.82 hectares (14.4 acres)	Barnet; 51.651°N 0.244°W; TQ 216 961	Map	Details		Yes	The common is mainly oak and birch woodland, with some grassland, but it also has a sphagnum bog, which is rare in south-east England.
Ruffett and Big Woods	Big Wood, Sutton	7.01 hectares (17.3 acres)	Sutton; 51.326°N 0.161°W; TQ 282 602	Map	Details		Yes	Ruffett Wood has many sycamores and some old wild cherries, while Big Wood is dominated by sycamores. The ground flora is diverse.
Ruislip Local Nature Reserve	Ruislip Local Nature Reserve	4.42 hectares (10.9 acres) (Note: The Natural England details page gives the correct grid reference for Ruislip LNR, but the map wrongly shows Highgrove Wood. Ruislip Woods National Nature Reserve Management Plan gives the area and has maps of the site.)	Hillingdon; 51.597°N 0.428°W; TQ 090 899	Map	Details	National nature reserve, SSSI	No	The woods have a diverse mixture of woodland, willow carr and open heath.
Scadbury Park	Scadbury Park	117.02 hectares (289.2 acres)	Bromley; 51.411°N 0.094°E; TQ 457 701	Map	Details		Yes	Scadbury Park has extensive ancient woodland, neutral grassland, and pasture which is let to a tenant farmer.
Scratchwood and Moat Mount Open Space	Scratchwood pond	55.16 hectares (136.3 acres)	Barnet; 51.636°N 0.260°W; TQ 205 945	Map	Details		Yes	Scratchwood has areas of ancient oak and hornbeam woodland. Moat Mount has open pasture and woodland.
Scrattons Ecopark and extension	Scrattons Eco Park	1.92 hectares (4.7 acres)	Barking and Dagenham; 51.529°N 0.134°E; TQ 481 833	Map	Details		Free public access to part of the site	This is former allotments converted to an ecopark to provide a range of habitats for plants and animals.
Selsdon Wood	Selsdon Wood	78.96 hectares (195.1 acres)	Croydon; 51.338°N 0.043°W; TQ 364 617	Map	Details		Yes	Selsdon Wood is a former shooting estate, which is now open pasture and woodland with a Memorial Pond.
Sir Joseph Hood Memorial Wood	Sir Joseph Hood Memorial Wood and Beverley Brook	1.66 hectares (4.1 acres)	Merton; 51.390°N 0.240°W; TQ 226 671	Map	Details		Yes	The wood has a varied range of birds and tree species.
South Norwood Country Park	Lake in South Norwood Country Park	43.55 hectares (107.6 acres)	Croydon; 51.398°N 0.057°W; TQ 353 683	Map	Details		Yes	The park has a lake and meadows. Over a hundred bird species have been recorded.
Southwood Open Space	Southwood Open Space	12.91 hectares (31.9 acres)	Kingston; 51.385°N 0.270°W; TQ 205 665	Map	Details		Yes	A linear park along the Hogsmill River. It is mainly meadow with elm scrub.
Spencer Road Wetlands	Spencer Road Wetlands	1.05 hectares (2.6 acres)	Sutton; 51.385°N 0.163°W; TQ 279 667	Map	Details	London Wildlife Trust	No	The wetland is next to the River Wandle. Habitats include reed swamp, willow Carr, a sedge bed and a pond.
The Spinney, Carshalton	The Spinney, Carshalton	0.40 hectares (0.99 acres)	Sutton; 51.375°N 0.162°W; TQ 280 656	Map	Details		No	This is mainly sycamore and London plane. Breeding birds include dunnocks and wrens.
Springfield Park	Springfield Park lake	13.59 hectares (33.6 acres)	Hackney; 51.570°N 0.059°W; TQ 346 875	Map	Details		Yes	The park is a Regionally Important Geological Site. It has diverse habitats and fifty-six species of birds.
St. John's Wood Church Grounds	St John's Wood Churchyard wildlife area	1.99 hectares (4.9 acres)	Westminster; 51.532°N 0.169°W; TQ 271 830	Map	Details		Yes	This closed cemetery has a wildlife area, trees and a formal garden.
Stanmore Common	Stanmore Common	49.2 hectares (122 acres)	Harrow; 51.632°N 0.328°W; TQ 158 939	Map	Details		Yes	The common has heathland and woodland. It also has two former village ponds, one of which still has a pump.
Stanmore Country Park	Stanmore Country Park	30.73 hectares (75.9 acres)	Harrow; 51.622°N 0.307°W; TQ 173 928	Map	Details		Yes	The park has large areas of acidic grassland, mainly common bent and Yorkshire fog. It also has woodland which is relatively young.
Streatham Common	Streatham Common	13.77 hectares (34.0 acres)	Lambeth; 51.422°N 0.119°W; TQ 309 709	Map	Details		Yes	The common has woodland mainly of oak, with other trees such as sycamore and beech. A damp area has rare plants.
Sue Godfrey Nature Park	Sue Godfrey Nature Park	0.60 hectares (1.5 acres)	Lewisham; 51.479°N 0.023°W; TQ 374 774	Map	Details		Yes	This site became a nature park in 1984 after a campaign by local residents. It has over two hundred species of flowers, trees and shrubs.
Sutcliffe Park	Sutcliffe Park lake	5.86 hectares (14.5 acres)	Greenwich; 51.455°N 0.029°E; TQ 411 748	Map	Details		Yes	The River Quaggy flows through this park, which also has wetlands and a lake with extensive reed beds.
Sutton Ecology Centre Grounds	Sutton Ecology Centre Grounds	1.33 hectares (3.3 acres)	Sutton; 51.366°N 0.166°W; TQ 278 646	Map	Details		Yes	The centre has a plane tree which is listed as one of the Great Trees of London. A pond has damselflies and dragonflies.
Sydenham Hill Wood and Fern Bank	Folly in Sydenham Hill Wood	28.17 hectares (69.6 acres)	Southwark; 51.435°N 0.074°W; TQ 340 724	Map	Details		Yes	This is a mixture of ancient and modern woodland, and Victorian garden plants including a monkey puzzle tree.
Ten Acre Wood	Burning Brash at Ten Acre Wood, Hillingdon	N/Av (Note: Ten Acre Wood is described on the Natural England details page as part of Yeading Woods LNR, managed by the London Wildlife Trust. This page has a grid reference and map which is correct according to the LWT. However the separate Natural England map shows a different location, the southern half of Yeading Brook Meadows. The LWT gives a map but not the area for this site.)	Hillingdon; 51.542°N 0.420°W; TQ 097 838	Map	Details	London Wildlife Trust	Yes	This is an oak plantation, with some hawthorns and blackthorns which provide a source of berries for birds.
Tolworth Court Farm Fields	Tolworth Court Farm Fields	43.31 hectares (107.0 acres)	Kingston; 51.373°N 0.279°W; TQ 199 651	N/Av (Note: There is no map of Tolworth Court Farm Fields on Natural England's Magic Map. There is a map on a noticeboard on the site, but none which can be copied under Wikimedia rules.)	Details		Yes	The site has been farmed since Domesday, and is currently managed as neutral hay meadows. The damp northern field has plants typical of periodically waterlogged fields, such as creeping bent and marsh foxtail.
Totteridge Fields	Totteridge Fields	6.92 hectares (17.1 acres)	Barnet; 51.632°N 0.234°W; TQ 223 940	Map	Details	London Wildlife Trust	Yes	The fields are ancient hay meadows with hawthorn and blackthorn hedgerows, which provide nesting sites for birds.
Tower Hamlets Cemetery Park	Tower Hamlets Cemetery Park	11.60 hectares (28.7 acres)	Tower Hamlets; 51.523°N 0.030°W; TQ 368 823	Map	Details		Yes	This closed nineteenth century cemetery has ancient woodland and pastures sown with wild flowers.
Wandle Meadow Nature Park	Wandle Meadow Nature Park	3.44 hectares (8.5 acres)	Merton; 51.424°N 0.183°W; TQ 264 710	Map	Details		Yes	This site has woodland, wet grassland and temporary ponds. Breeding birds include bullfinches, whitethroats and reed buntings.
Wandle Valley Wetland	Wandle Valley Wetland	0.63 hectares (1.6 acres)	Sutton; 51.384°N 0.165°W; TQ 278 666	Map	Details		No	The wetland has frogs, toads and newts, and brown hawker dragonflies.
Westbere Copse	Westbere Copse	0.39 hectares (0.96 acres)	Camden; 51.553°N 0.207°W; TQ 244 853	Map	Details		Public access at limited times	The main trees in Westbere Copse are sycamore, oak, ash and aspen, with an understorey including snowberry, elder and elm.
Wilderness Island	Wilderness Island	2.73 hectares (6.7 acres)	Sutton; 51.372°N 0.160°W; TQ 282 653	Map	Details	London Wildlife Trust	Yes	This is an island in the River Wandle. It has diverse habitats, with woods, ponds, wild flower meadows and wetlands.
The Wood and Richard Jefferies Bird Sanctuary	The Wood, Surbiton	1.46 hectares (3.6 acres)	Kingston; 51.390°N 0.303°W; TQ 182 670	Map	Details		Free public access to part of the site	This used to be the garden of a large Victorian house. It has ancient woodland, and insects including stag beetles.
Wormwood Scrubs	Martin Bell's Wood in Wormwood Scrubs Park	13.40 hectares (33.1 acres)	Hammersmith & Fulham; 51.521°N 0.237°W; TQ 223 817	Map	Details		Yes	The nature area in the park has a wide variety of trees, including pedunculate oak and silver birch. Rare birds include marsh harrier and whinchat. There are also meadows with a large population of butterflies.
Yeading Brook Meadows	Yeading Brook in Yeading Brook Meadows	17.00 hectares (42.0 acres) (Note: The Natural England details page for Yeading Brook Meadows describes the site as located in Hillingdon and Ealing and managed by the London Wildlife Trust. However the Natural England map shows a small area in Ealing which is not part of the reserve according to the LWT. The map and area for this site are taken from the LWT.)	Ealing Hillingdon; 51.529°N 0.411°W; TQ 103 823	Map	Details		Yes	This is a meadow site along the Yeading Brook managed by the London Wildlife Trust. Invertebrates include Roesel's bush-crickets and shield bugs.
Yeading Woods (Gutteridge Wood and Meadows)	Gutteridge Wood and Meadows	25 hectares (62 acres) (Note: This site is described on the Natural England details page as including Gutteridge Wood. The Ten Acre Wood details page has a map of the site showing it in two adjoining blocks, and states that it is part of Yeading Woods. The Natural England map of Yeading Woods shows Gutteridge Wood and part of Ten Acre Wood. The map in this table is an LWT one, but the LWT does not show the area. The area is taken from the Natural England listing.)	Hillingdon; 51.545°N 0.427°W; TQ 092 841	Map	Details	London Wildlife Trust	Yes	This site has ancient oak and hazel woodland and wildflower meadows.

== Map of London boroughs ==

1. City of London (not a London borough)
2. City of Westminster
3. Kensington and Chelsea
4. Hammersmith and Fulham
5. Wandsworth
6. Lambeth
7. Southwark
8. Tower Hamlets
9. Hackney
10. Islington
11. Camden
12. Brent
13. Ealing
14. Hounslow
15. Richmond upon Thames
16. Kingston upon Thames
17. Merton
18. Sutton
19. Croydon
20. Bromley
21. Lewisham
22. Greenwich
23. Bexley
24. Havering
25. Barking and Dagenham
26. Redbridge
27. Newham
28. Waltham Forest
29. Haringey
30. Enfield
31. Barnet
32. Harrow
33. Hillingdon

== See also ==
- List of local nature reserves in England
- List of national nature reserves in England
- List of Sites of Special Scientific Interest in Greater London
- Parks and open spaces in London
