= Brookmill Road Local Nature Reserve =

Nature reserve in Lewisham, London, England

Coordinates: 51.4686°N 0.0204°W

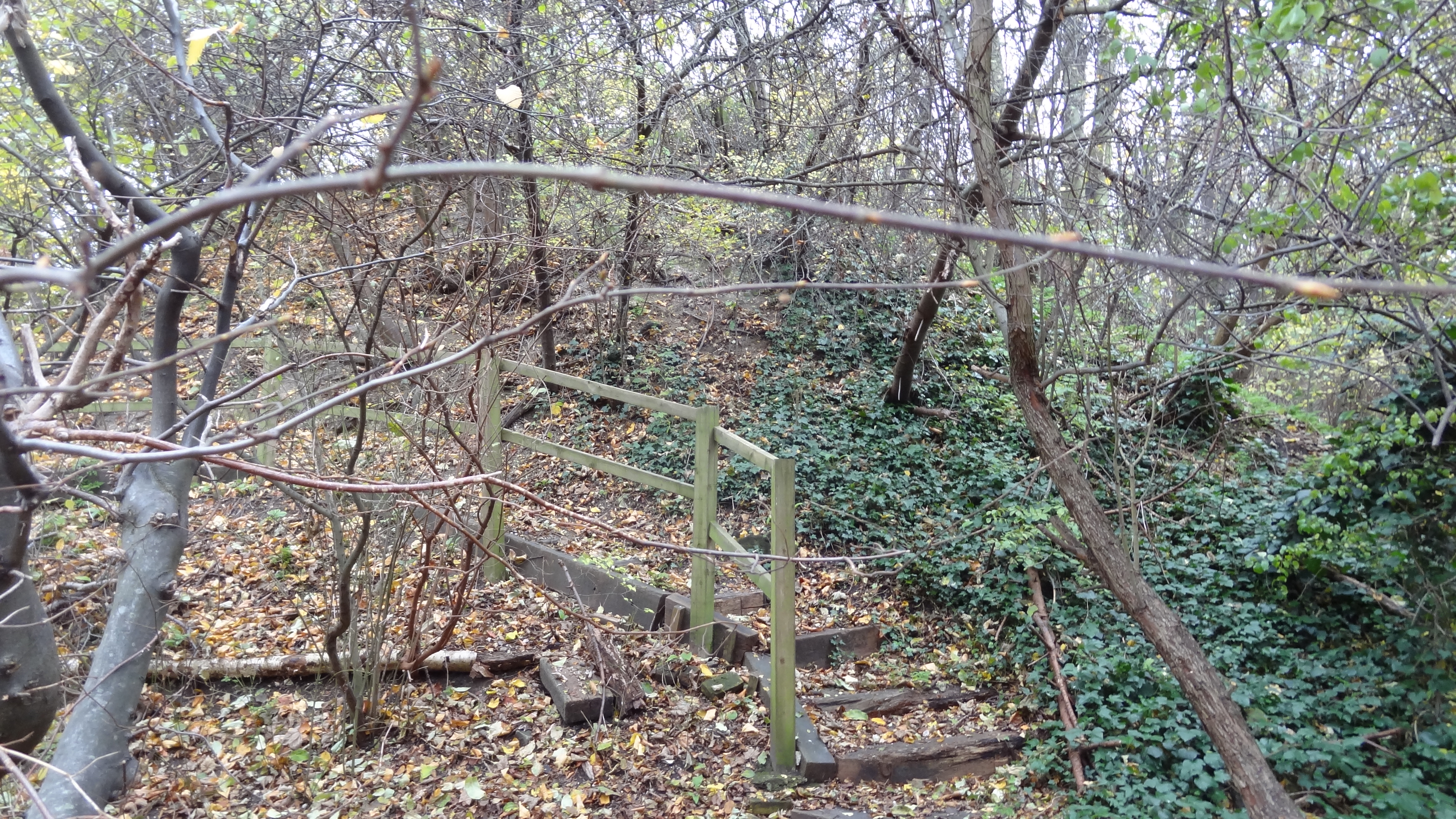

Brookmill Road Local Nature Reserve is a small nature reserve in St Johns in the London Borough of Lewisham. It has been designated as a local nature reserve.

The reserve is on a disused railway embankment between Brookmill Road and the Lewisham to St Johns railway line. The railway ceased operating in 1916 and the tracks were taken up in 1929. In 1979 Lewisham Council purchased the land and established a nature reserve on the site with the help of the local branch of the London Wildlife Trust.

The existing vegetation was bramble, ivy and cow parsley, and species such as yellow archangel and wood anemone have since been planted. The reserve also has three small ponds and a stand of stag's-horn sumach.

The entrance on Brookmill Road between Elverson Road and Albyn Road is kept locked and there is no public access.
