= Masons Field =

Nature reserve in the London Borough of Brent, England

Coordinates: 51.5833°N 0.273672°W

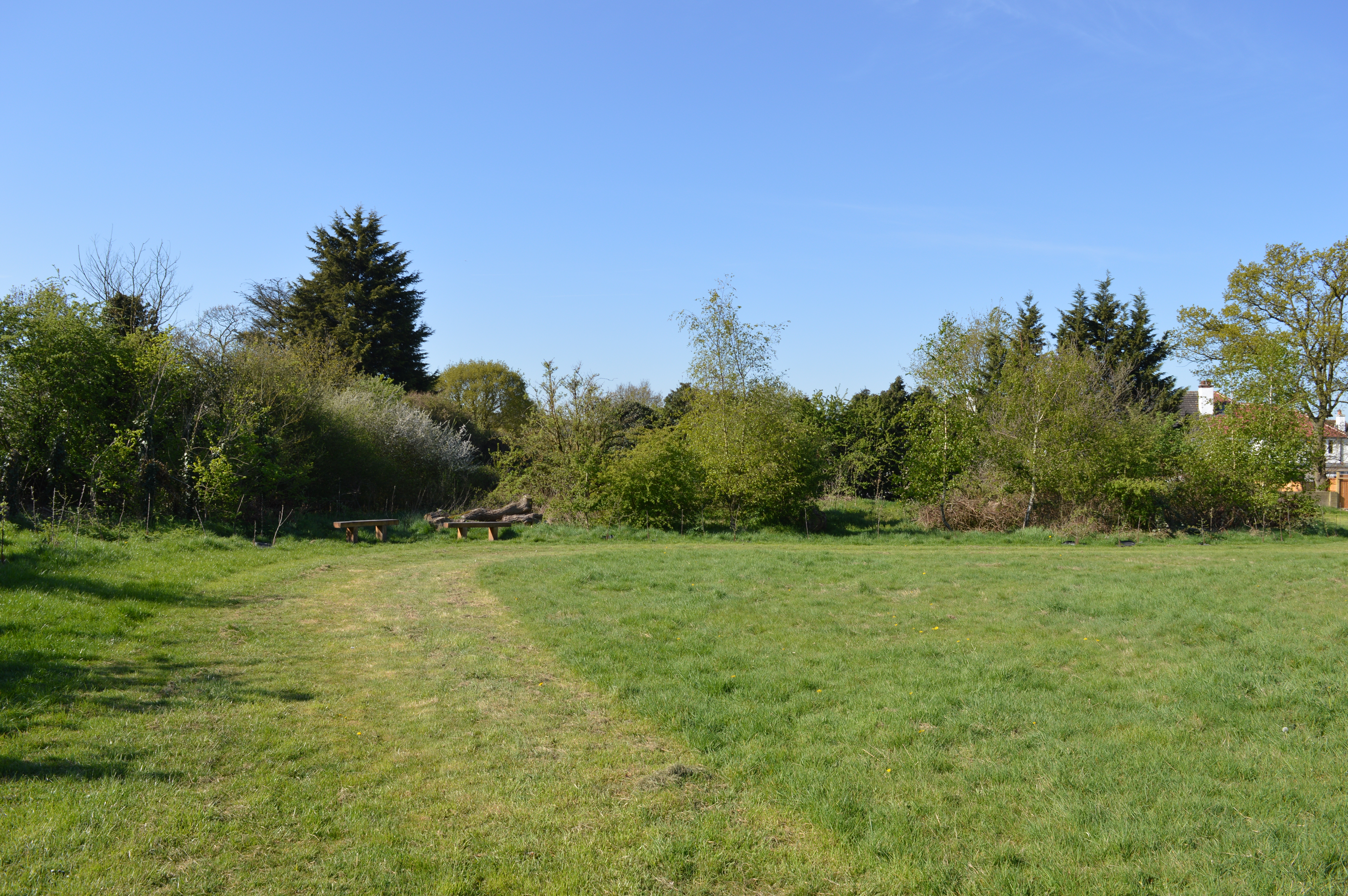

Masons Field is a 2.9 hectare Local Nature Reserve (LNR) in Kingsbury in the London Borough of Brent. It was declared an LNR in 2013, it is owned by London Underground and managed by Brent Council on a 125-year leasehold.

The site was part of a larger area called Masons Field, which was rented in 1426 by a mason called John Lyon. In the late sixteenth century it was shown as farmland on a map of Kingsbury produced by the landowner, All Souls College, Oxford. In 1927 the London General Omnibus Company purchased the land to provide a sports ground for its employees. In the 1990s London Transport sold part of the land for housing, with the rest becoming public open space joined to the neighbouring Fryent Country Park. The Heritage Lottery Fund contributed £47,000 to assist in restoring the site to a countryside habitat. The Barn Hill Conservation Group works with Brent Council to convert the site to a wildflower meadow.

There is access from Fryent Country Park and from Larkspur Close.
