= Derwent Floodwash =

Nature reserve in London, England

Coordinates: 51.3922°N 0.2263°W

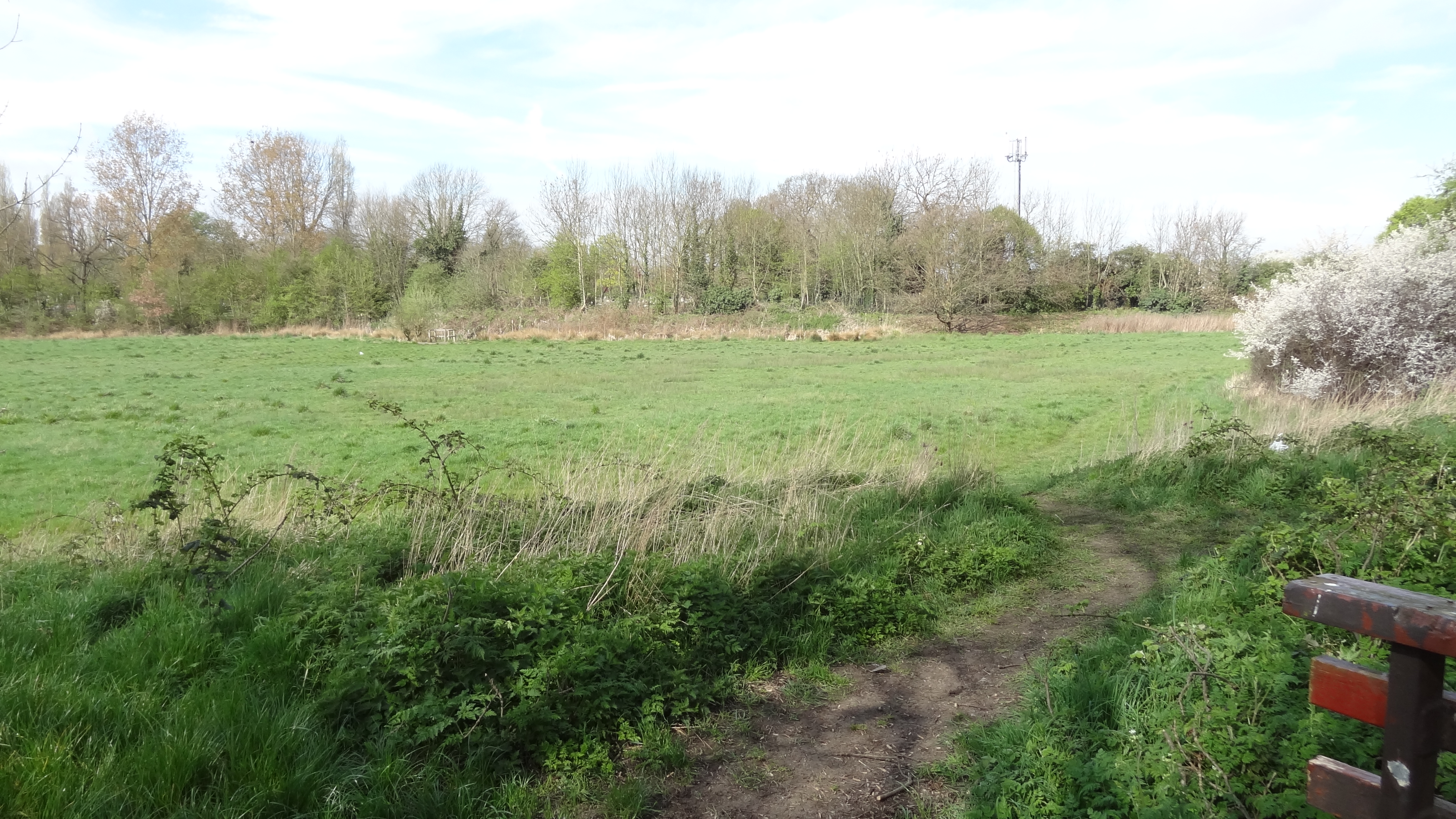

Derwent Floodwash is a 1.8 hectare Local Nature Reserve and Site of Borough Importance for Nature Conservation, Grade II, in Morden Park in the London Borough of Merton. It is owned by the London Borough of Wandsworth and managed by Merton Council. The site borders Pyl Brook, and it is designed to store flood waters when the brook overflows, preventing flooding of properties downstream.

The Floodwash is a wet meadow which has uncommon flower species, such as spiked sedge and grass vetchling. Ponds have been created around the edges, which support dragonflies in the summer.

There is access from Derwent Road.
