= Jubilee Wood, Malden Rushett =

Natural area in the UK

Coordinates: 51.3427°N 0.32105°W

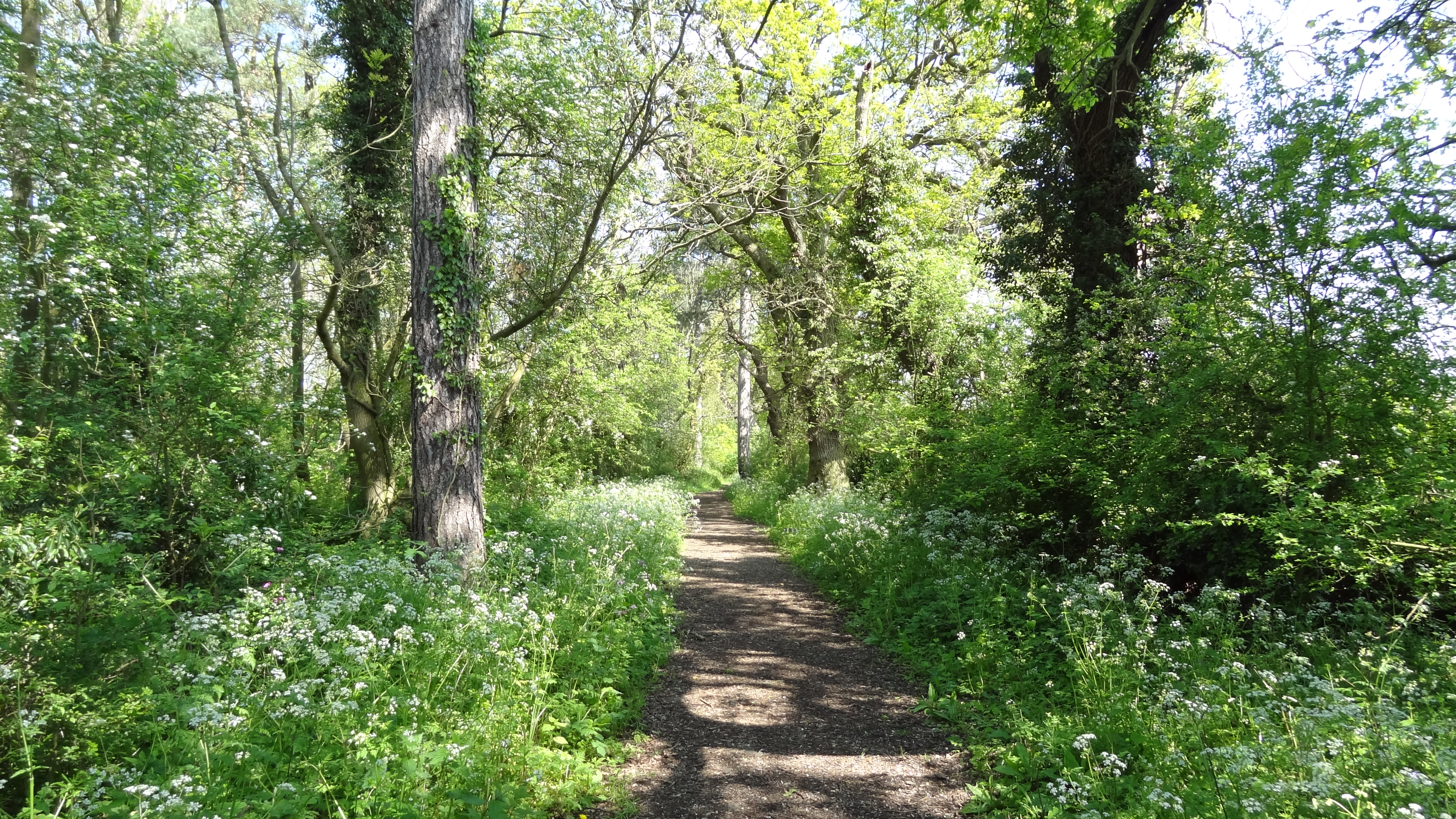

Jubilee Wood is located in Malden Rushett in the Royal Borough of Kingston upon Thames in London. It is divided into two parts, separated by an electricity sub-station. They are part of the 22 hectare 'Sixty Acre Wood and Jubilee Wood' Site of Metropolitan Importance for Nature Conservation, and the two hectare eastern wood, which is the only part which is publicly accessible, is also a Local Nature Reserve. (Note: The Natural England map incorrectly shows the western wood as the LNR. Kingston Council's own map of LNRs and a notice on the site shows the eastern wood as the LNR.)

The wood was planted to celebrate Queen Victoria's Golden Jubilee in 1887. Trees include birch, pedunculate oak, ash and field maple.
