= Oak Avenue Local Nature Reserve =

Nature reserve in London, England

Coordinates: 51.4278°N 0.3875°W

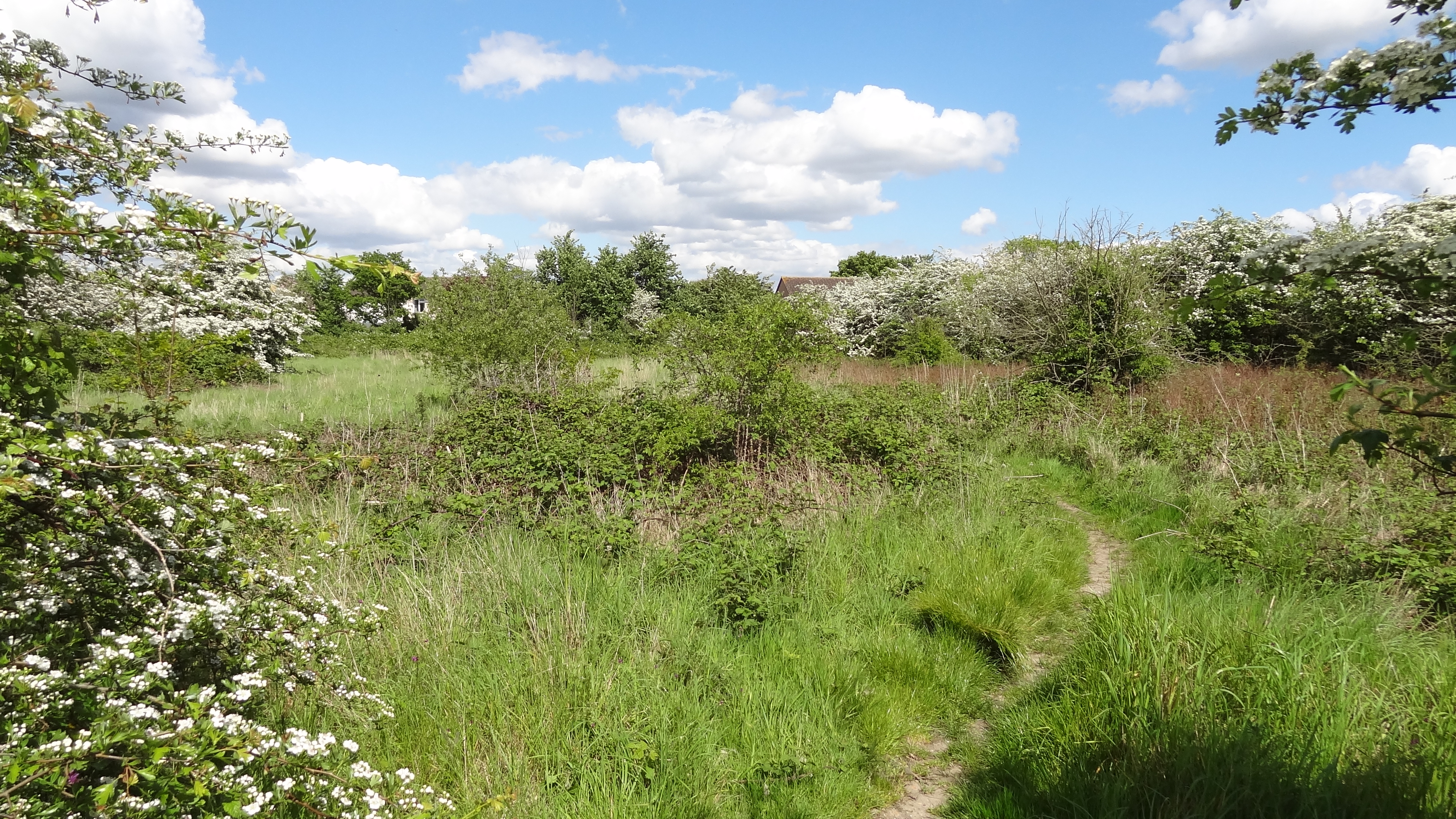

Oak Avenue is a 1.85 hectare Local Nature Reserve and Grade II Site of Borough Importance for Nature Conservation in Hampton in the London Borough of Richmond upon Thames. It is owned and managed by Richmond upon Thames Borough Council.

This site previously had greenhouses for local nursery gardens and was re-landscaped by local groups and volunteers. Its habitats include a wildflower meadow, hedges and a pond. Some of the plants are unusual, such as Greek dock and cotton thistle, and there are invertebrates including butterflies.

There is access from Forge Lane and Oak Avenue.
