= Cranebank =

Nature reserve in Hatton, London, England

Coordinates: 51.47302°N 0.4141°W

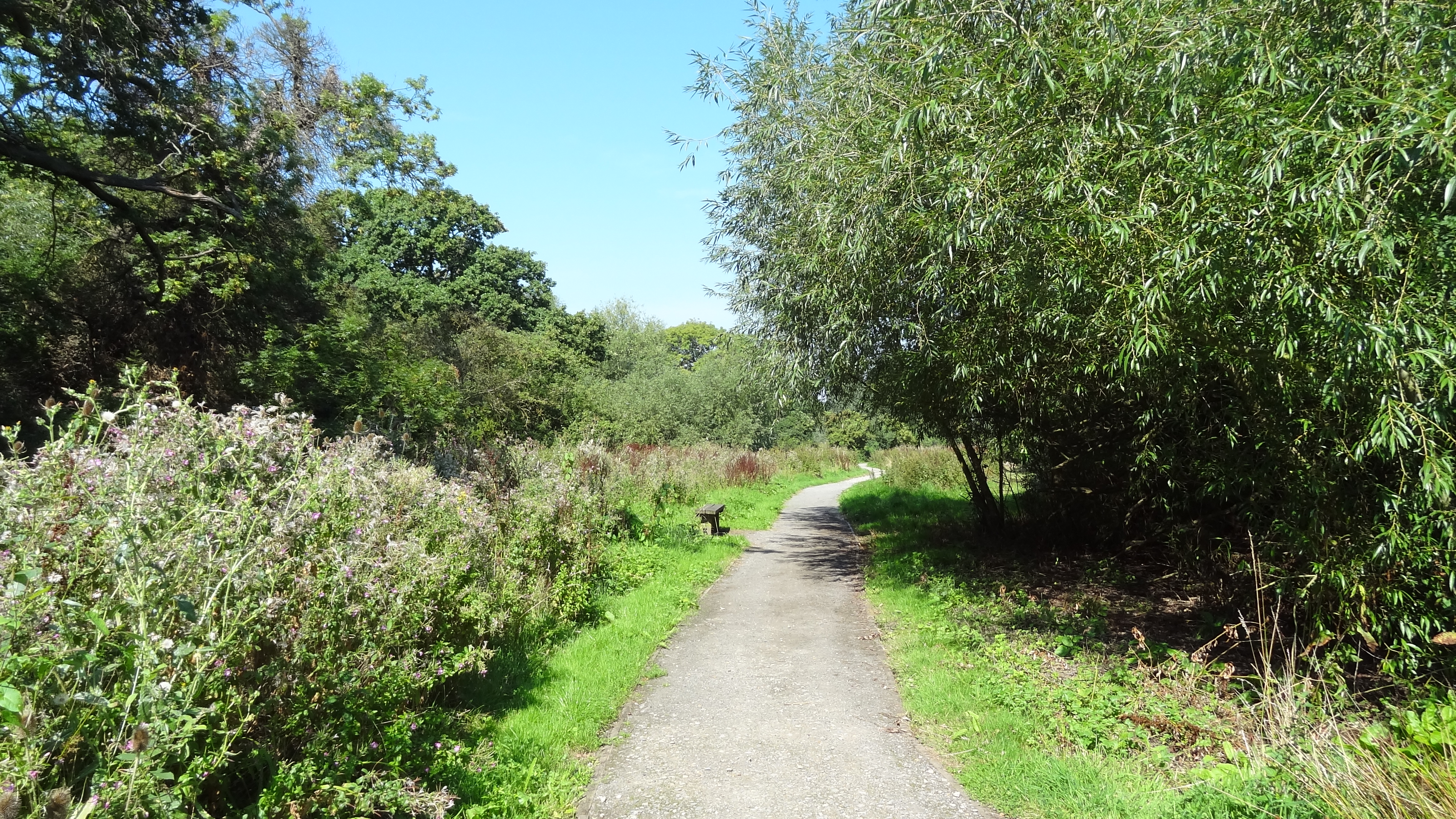
Path in Cranebank

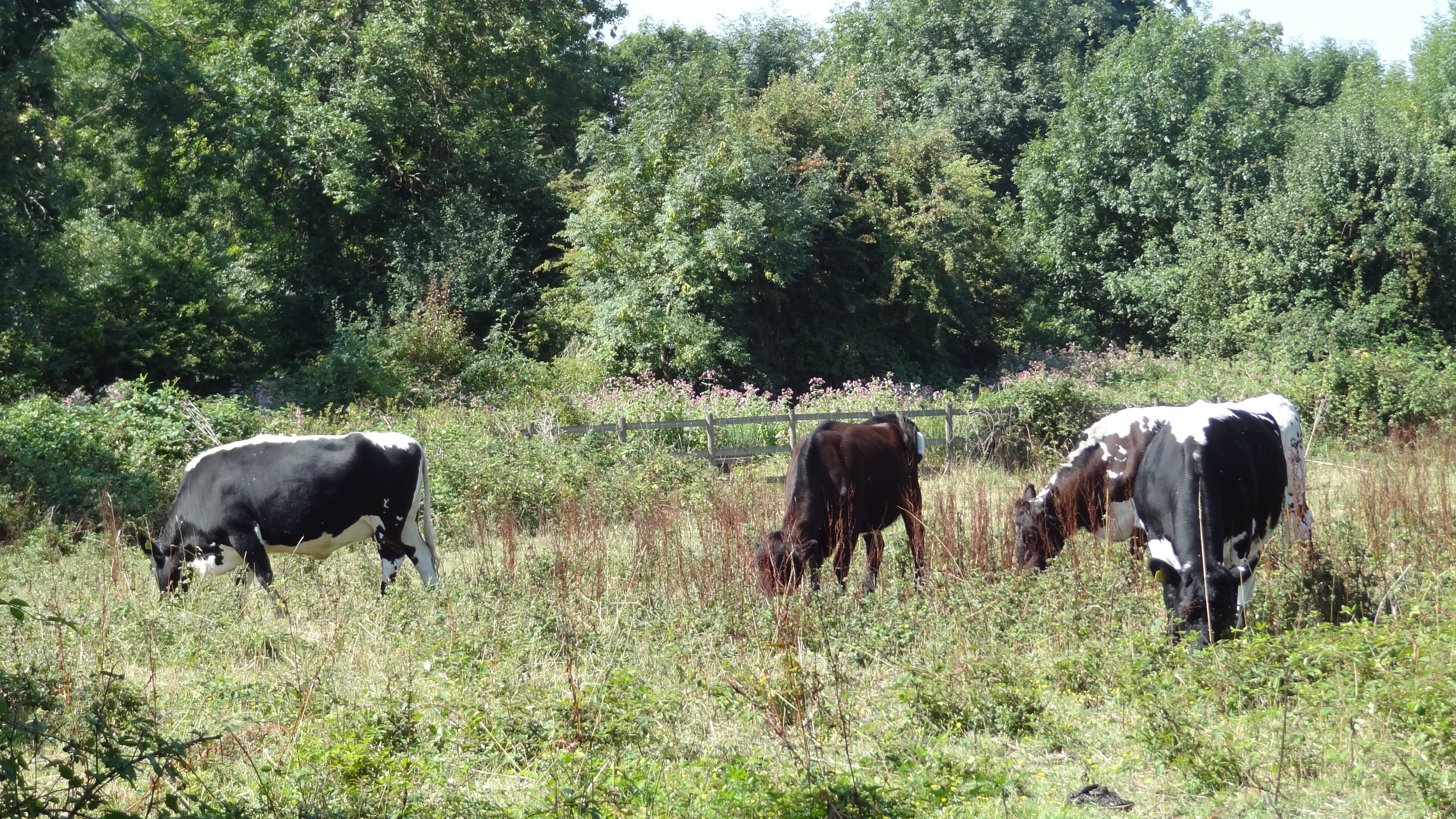
Cows graze to maintain the biodiversity of the grassland

Cranebank is a Local Nature Reserve on the east bank of the River Crane in Hatton in the London Borough of Hounslow. It is owned and managed by Hounslow Council. It is also part of The Crane Corridor Site of Metropolitan Importance for Nature Conservation.

== The site ==
Cranebank has water meadows which have a number of locally rare species, such as cuckoo flower and ragged robin. It also has ox-bow lakes, and there are 26 species of butterflies and 12 of damselflies and dragonflies.

The reserve is part of a park which has a variety of names. An old notice on the site calls it River Crane Park, while a newer one shows it as part of Crane Valley Park, which stretches along the River Crane from Great Chertsey Road to the Grand Union Canal. It is also shown as part of the six mile long linear Crane Valley Park by London Gardens Online, while London's environmental information centre, Greenspace Information for Greater London, calls it Dudset Farm Pastures. The London Loop long-distance walk goes through the reserve, and the directions show it as Crane Bank Park.

== Access ==
There is access from Earhart Way and Waye Avenue Open Space.
