= Wandle Valley Wetland =

Nature reserve in Carshalton, London, England

Coordinates: 51.3850°N 0.1640°W

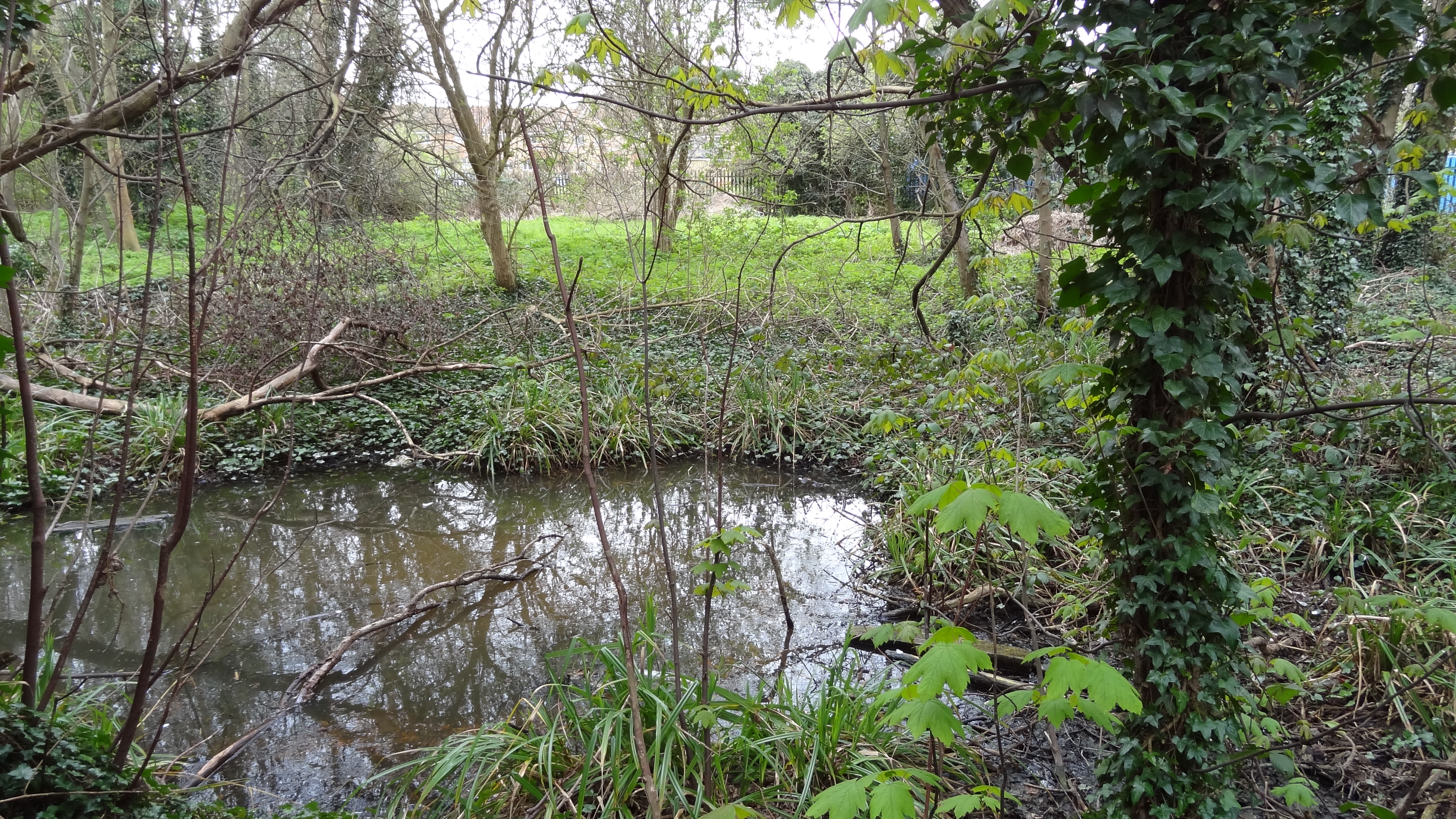
Pond in Wandle Valley Wetland

Wandle Valley Wetland is a 0.6 hectare Local Nature Reserve in Carshalton in the London Borough of Sutton. It is owned by the Council and managed by the Council together with Sutton Nature Conservation Volunteers.

The site has open water and seasonal pools, scrub and wet woodland. There are frogs, toads and newts, together with Brown Hawker dragonflies and birds including blackcaps and wrens.

The entrance in Budge Lane is kept locked and there is no public access.
