= Pale sedge =

Pale sedge is a common name for several plants and may refer to:

- Carex livida
- Carex pallescens
