= Long Wood, Ealing =

Nature reserve in London, England

Coordinates: 51.4963°N 0.3387°W

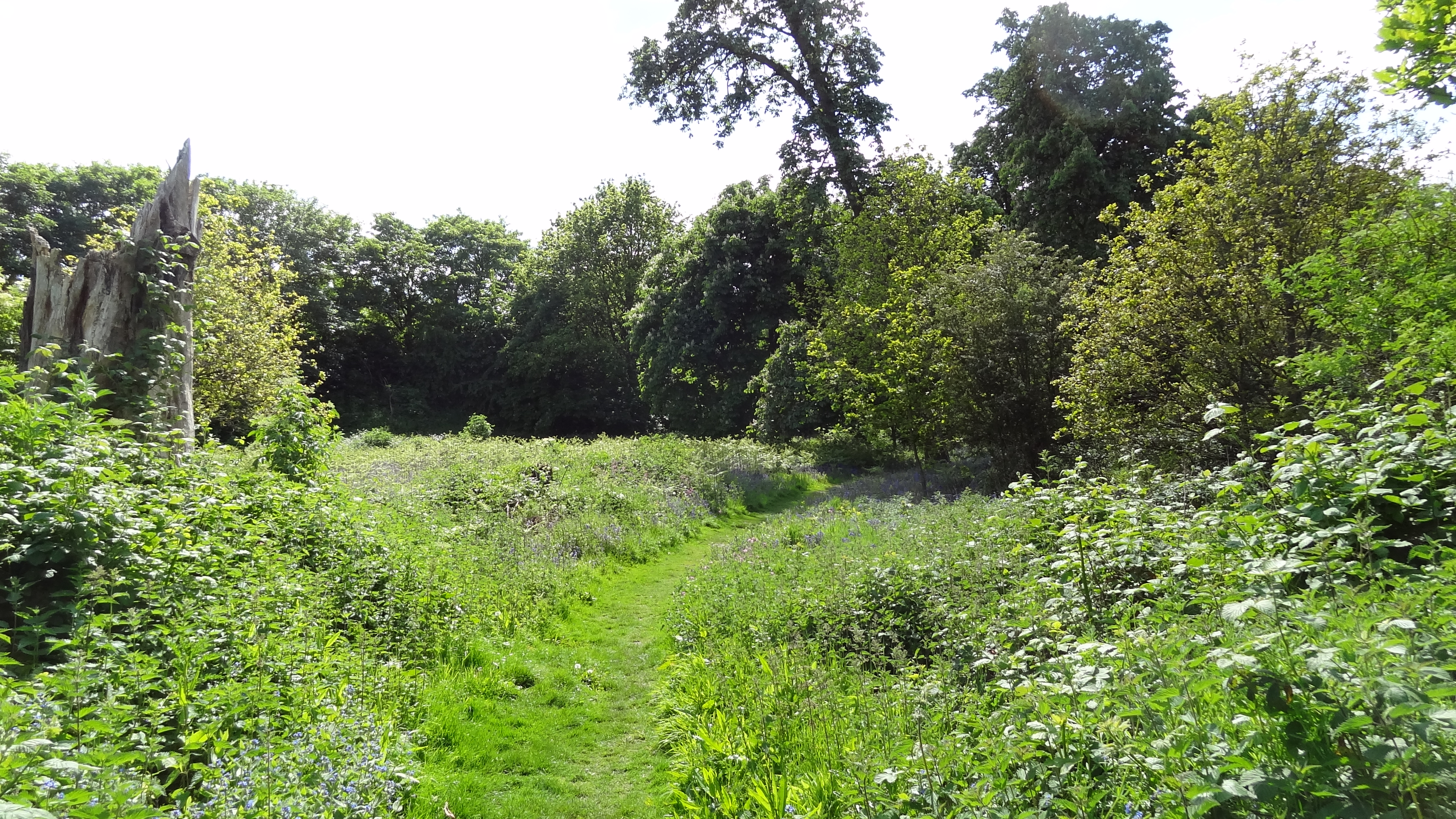

Long Wood is a 1.2 hectare Local Nature Reserve and Site of Borough Importance for Nature Conservation, Grade 1, in Norwood Green in the London Borough of Ealing. It is owned and managed by Ealing Council.

The site has ancient woodland, marshy areas, a stream and more open areas. Flora include bluebells, false brome and wood millet. Wet areas have Opposite-leaved golden-saxifrage and large bittercress, which are rare in London. An unusual feature is a mature oak and cherry tree which have the same trunk.

There is access from Windmill Lane, close to an M4 bridge, and from Trumpers Way, by a footpath which crosses a railway line.
