= Oakleigh Way =

Nature reserve in Mitcham, London, England

Coordinates: 51.4126°N 0.1493°W

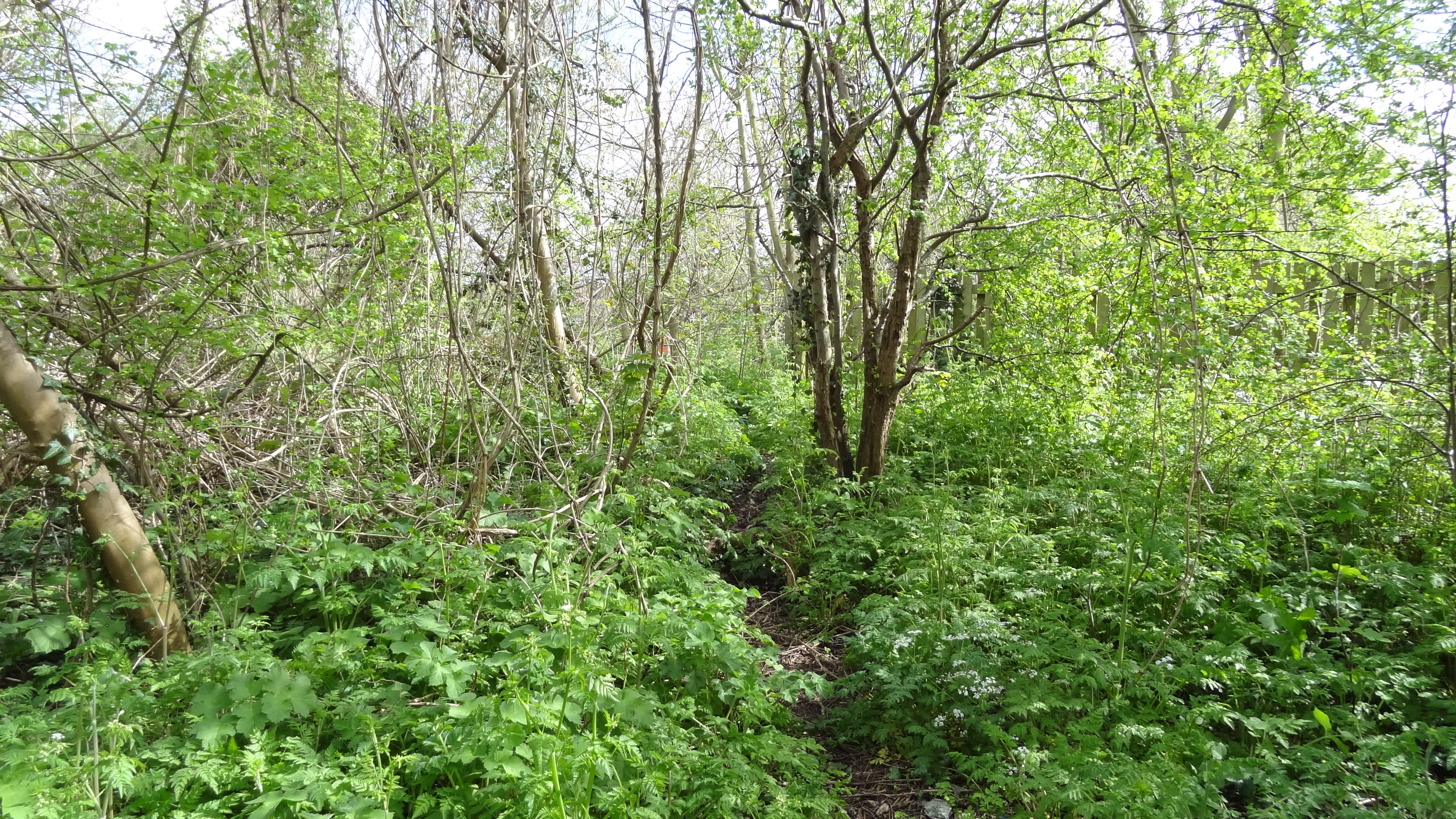

Oakleigh Way is a 0.64 hectare Local Nature Reserve and a Site of Borough Importance for Nature Conservation, Grade II, in Mitcham in the London Borough of Merton. It adjoins Oakleigh Way Recreation Ground, and is owned and managed by Merton Council.

The site was a railway depot and sidings. It is now birch woodland with areas of scrub and grassland. Flowers include weld, zigzag clover and thyme-leaved sandwort.

There is access from Bennett's Close.
