= Ruffett and Big Woods =

Nature reserve in London, England

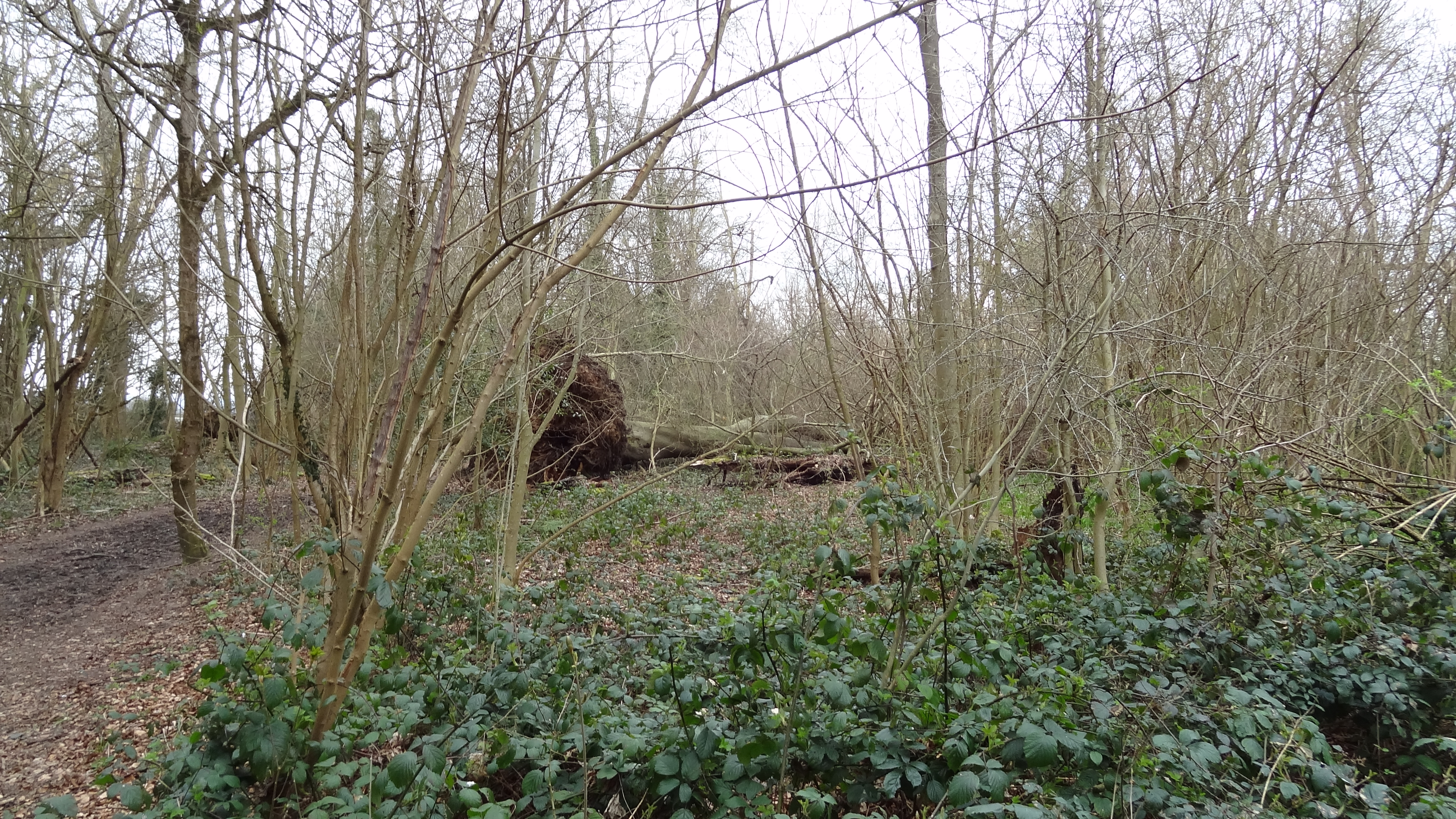
- Fallen tree in Big Wood

- Location within Greater London
- Interactive map of Ruffett and Big Woods

Geography
- Location: Greater London, England
- OS grid: TQ281604
- Coordinates: 51.329°N 0.162°W
- Area: 7 hectares (17 acres)

Administration
- Authority: Woodland Trust

Ruffett Wood and Big Wood are adjoining woods with a total area of 7 hectares (17 acres) on the border of the London Borough of Sutton, close to the village of Woodmansterne. Big Wood is to the south and Ruffett Wood (sometimes shown as Ruffet Wood) is to the north. They are owned by Sutton Council and managed by the Woodland Trust. They are designated a Local Nature Reserve and a Site of Borough Importance for Nature Conservation, Grade 1. The woods are the largest continuous area of woodland in the borough of Sutton.

Ruffett Wood is mainly sycamore, with some ash and hazel. It has some plant species indicative of ancient woodland, such as bluebells, dog's mercury and sanicle. Big Wood is even more dominated by sycamore, and has two large oaks, but due to shading by a high canopy it lacks indicator species apart from one stand of wood anemone. The site also has numerous bird species.

There is access from Richland Avenue.
