= Bennett's Hole =

Local Nature Reserve in Mitcham, London

Coordinates: 51.391°N 0.169°W

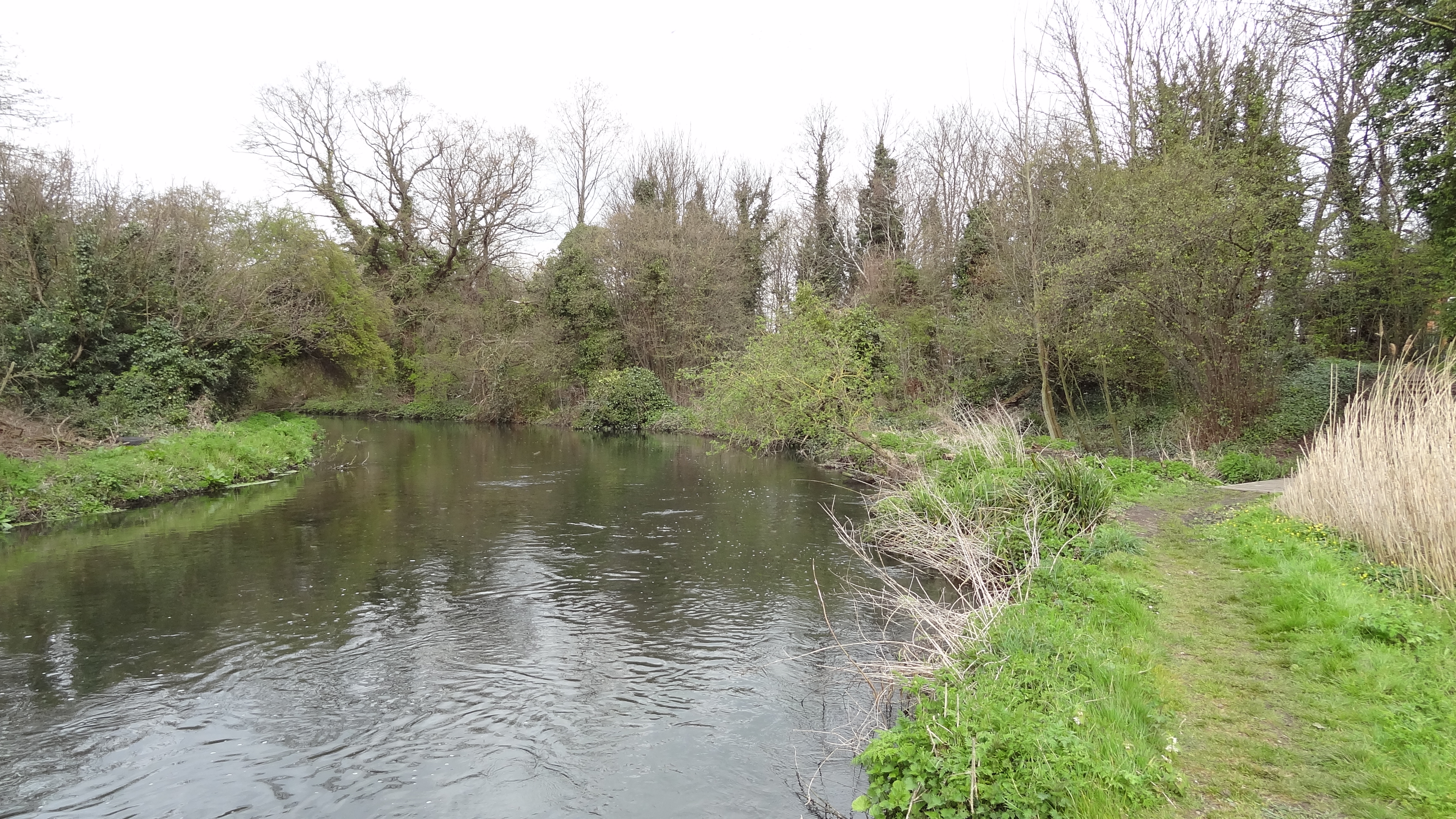
The River Wandle with Bennett's Hole on the right

Bennett's Hole is a 1.2 hectare Local Nature Reserve in Mitcham in the London Borough of Merton. According to the Natural England details page about the site, it is owned by Merton Council.

The reserve is a narrow strip along the east bank of the River Wandle. It has areas of woodland, marsh, scrub and an open ditch. Trees include crack willow and oak, and there is a variety of tall herbs. There is access from Willow Lane.
