= Merton Park Green Walks =

Footpath in London, England

Coordinates: 51.41156°N 0.19814°W

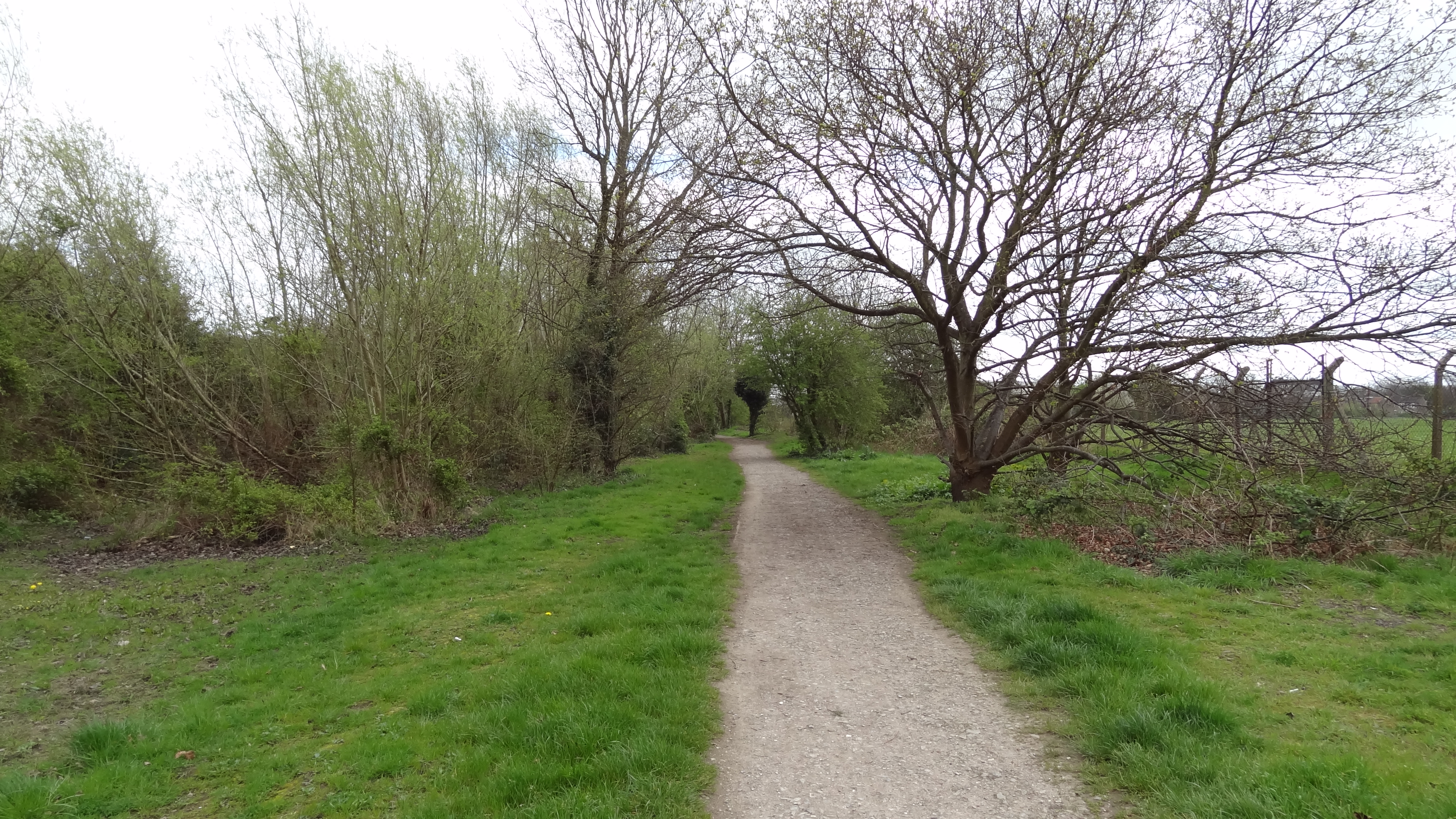

Merton Park Green Walks is a linear walk along the line of a former railway line between Merton Park tram stop and Morden Road in Merton Park in the London Borough of Merton. It is a 1.5 hectare Local Nature Reserve and a Site of Borough Importance for Nature Conservation, Grade II, which is owned and managed by Merton Council.

The walk has a varied range of habitats, with grassland, woodland and scrub. There is also a small inaccessible area of elm scrub and brambles.
