= Downham Woodland Walk =

Nature reserve in London, England

Coordinates: 51.4299°N 0.0024°E

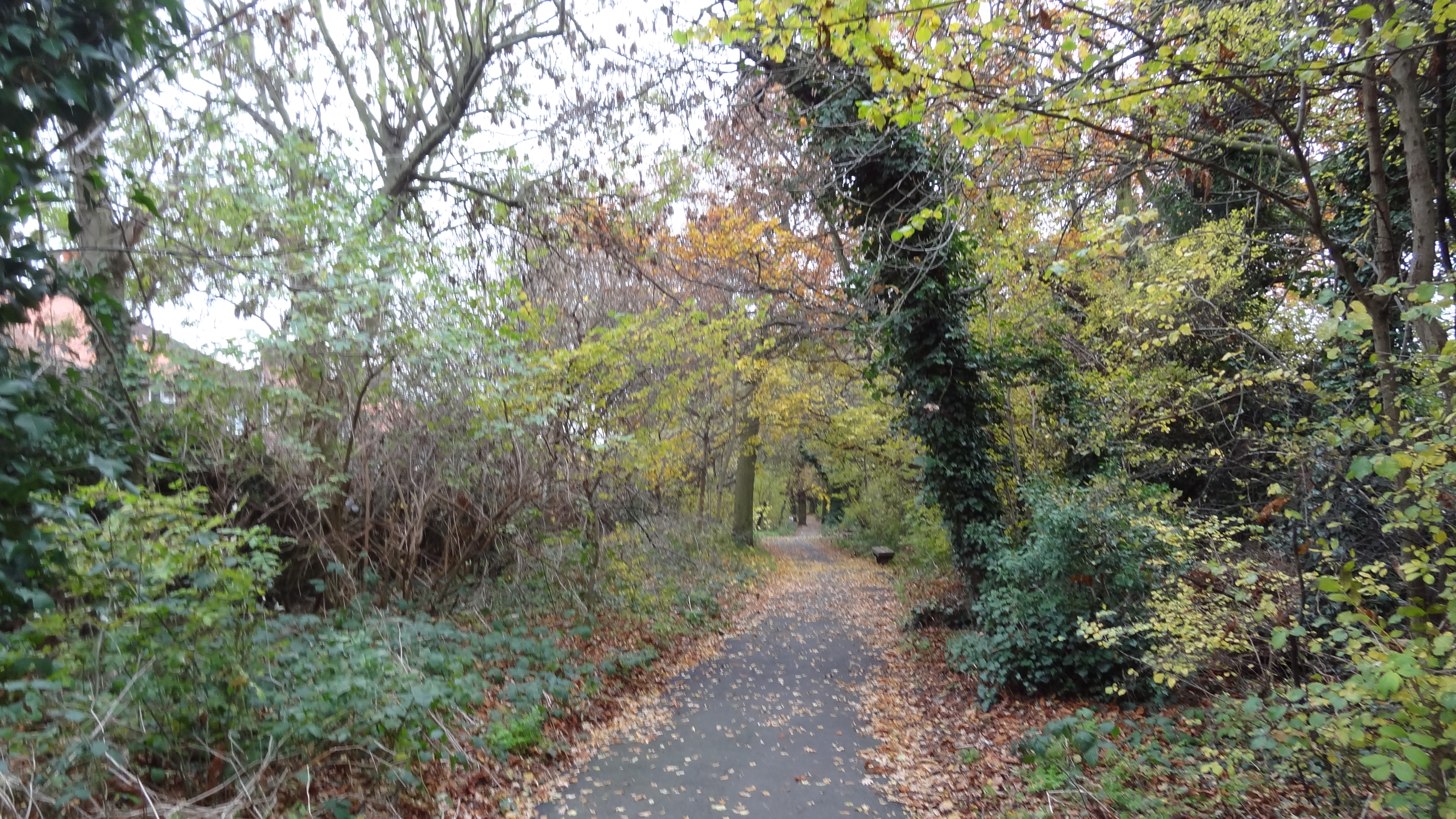

Downham Woodland Walk is a linear park and local nature reserve in Downham in the London Borough of Lewisham. It is also a Site of Borough Importance for Nature Conservation, Grade 1. The site is owned and managed by Lewisham Council.

The walk dates back to the nineteenth century, and with the construction of the Downham housing estate in 1920 it became an important green space for local residents. The eastern section between Moorside Road and Downderry Road existed in 1805, and it has a number of species indicative of ancient woodland, such as wood anemone and dog's mercury. West of Downderry Road the walk is narrower and the flora is less diverse. The walk has a good variety of birds and a number of rare invertebrates, such as the leaf beetle Chrysolina oricalcia and the ant Lasius brunneus, while hawthorns have a population of the nationally scarce jewel beetle Agrilus sinuatus.

The walk runs west from Moorside Road, opposite Undershaw Road, to cross Downderry Road, and then turns south to Oakridge Road. It then runs west again to finish at the junction of Oakridge Road and Bromley Road.
