= Anton Crescent Wetland =

Wetland in Sutton, London, England

Coordinates: 51.3725°N 0.2015°W

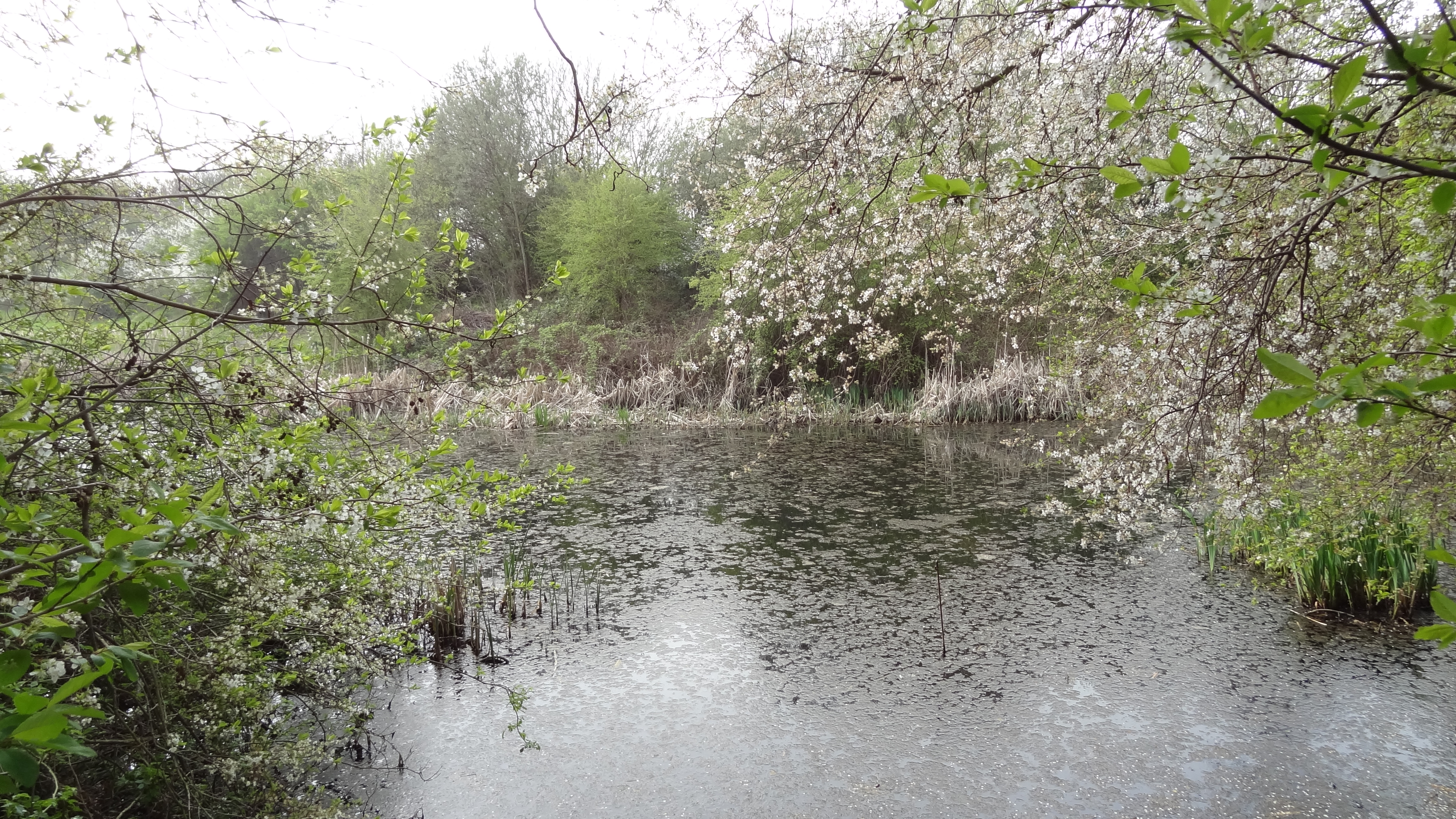

Anton Crescent Wetland is a one hectare Local Nature Reserve in Sutton in the London Borough of Sutton. It is owned by Sutton Council and managed by the council together with Sutton Nature Conservation Volunteers.

The site is operated as a flood storage wash for Pyl Brook by the Environment Agency, and there is no public access. The reserve has ponds, willow carr and reedbeds, and the ponds never dry out as the rock formation is Oxford Clay. The pools and mud provide a habitat for birds such as the green sandpiper and common snipe. In 2005/6 the Environment Agency funded the installation of a pond-dipping platform and boardwalk.

The entrance to the site is kept locked, but the reserve can be viewed from a footpath running along the back fence.
