= Litten Nature Reserve =

Nature reserve in London, England

Coordinates: 51.532°N 0.351°W

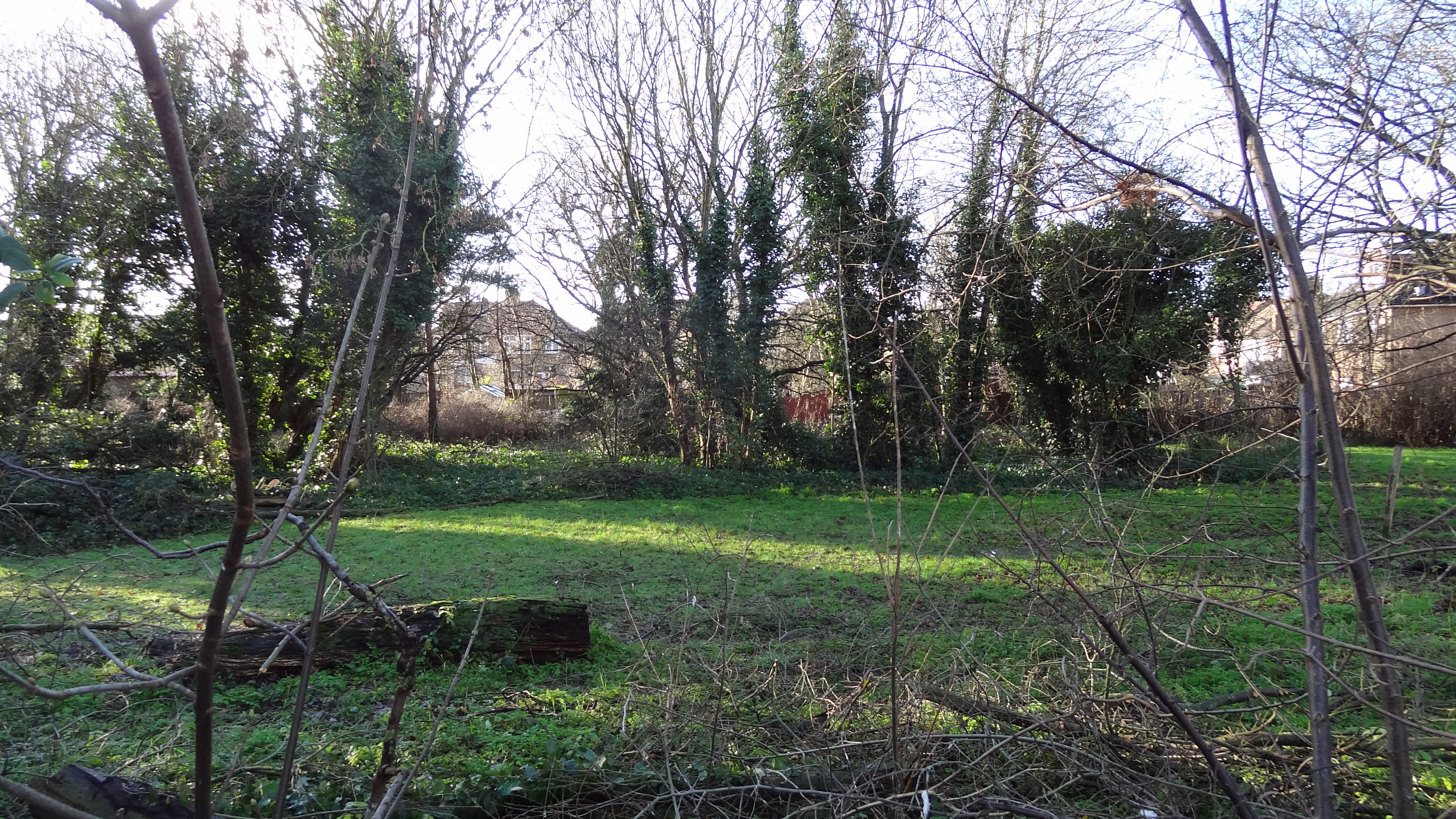

Litten Nature Reserve is 1 hectare a Site of Borough Importance for Nature Conservation, Grade II, and Local Nature Reserve in Greenford in the London Borough of Ealing. It is owned and managed by Ealing Council.

The site has varied woodland, with species including horse chestnut, hazel, oak, elder and snowberry. The ground level is dominated by ivy. There are also ponds and wetland areas, with plants such as pendulous sedge and water plantain. The site has a classroom and toilets, but there is no public access. The entrance is on Oldfield Lane South.
