= Myrna Close =

Nature reserve in London, England

Coordinates: 51.4176°N 0.1699°W

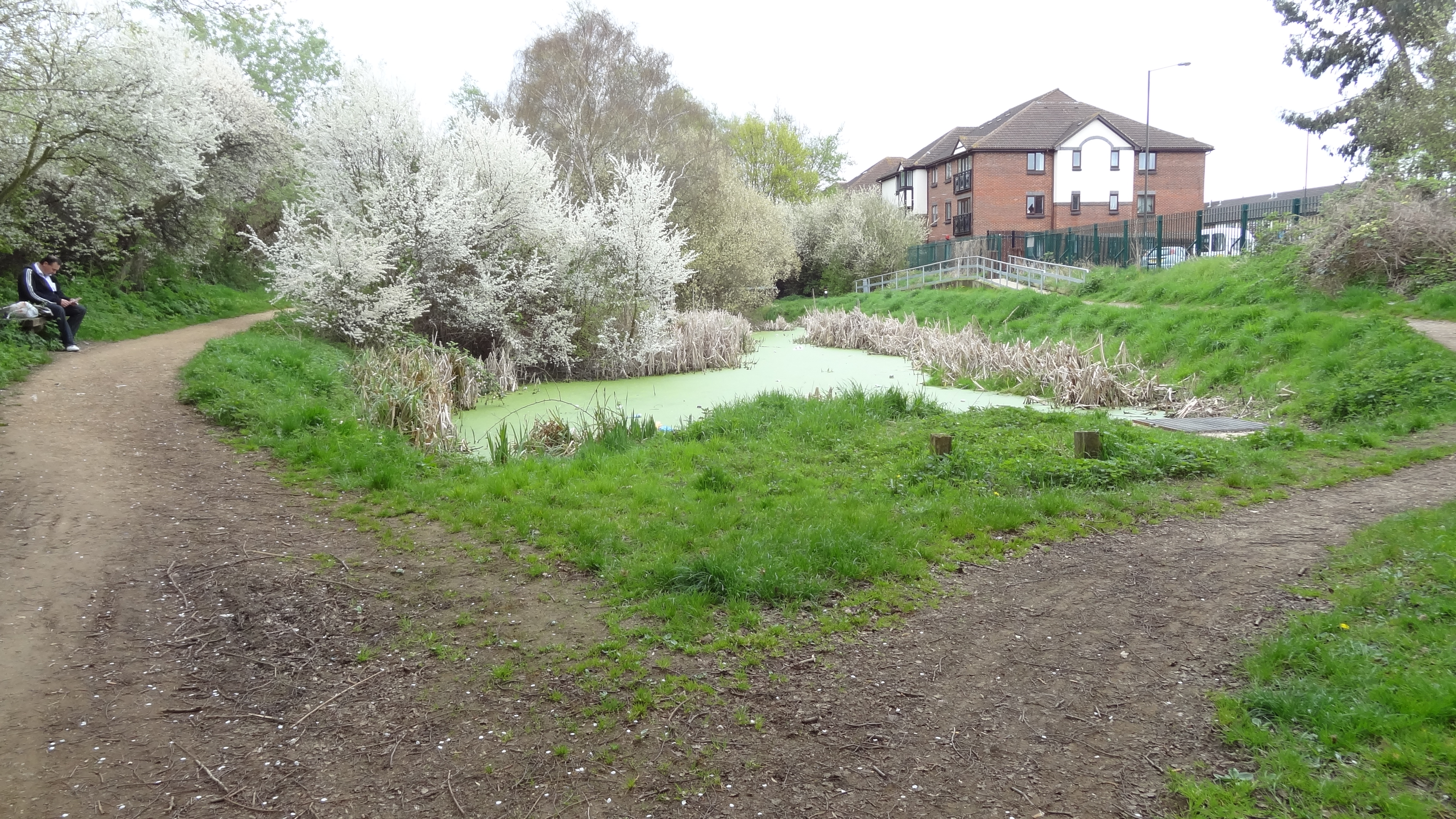

Myrna Close is a linear walk along the line of a former railway line in Colliers Wood in the London Borough of Merton. It is a 0.75 hectare Local Nature Reserve and a Site of Borough Importance for Nature Conservation, Grade II, which is owned and managed by Merton Council.

The vegetation is grassland, woodland and scrub. The main trees are elm, oak, and sycamore, and the reserve provides an important habitat for birds and butterflies. There is also a small stream and two ponds, which support wetland plants including brooklime.

There is access from the road called Myrna Close.
