= The Wood, Surbiton =

Park in Surbiton, London

Coordinates: 51.3907°N 0.30236°W

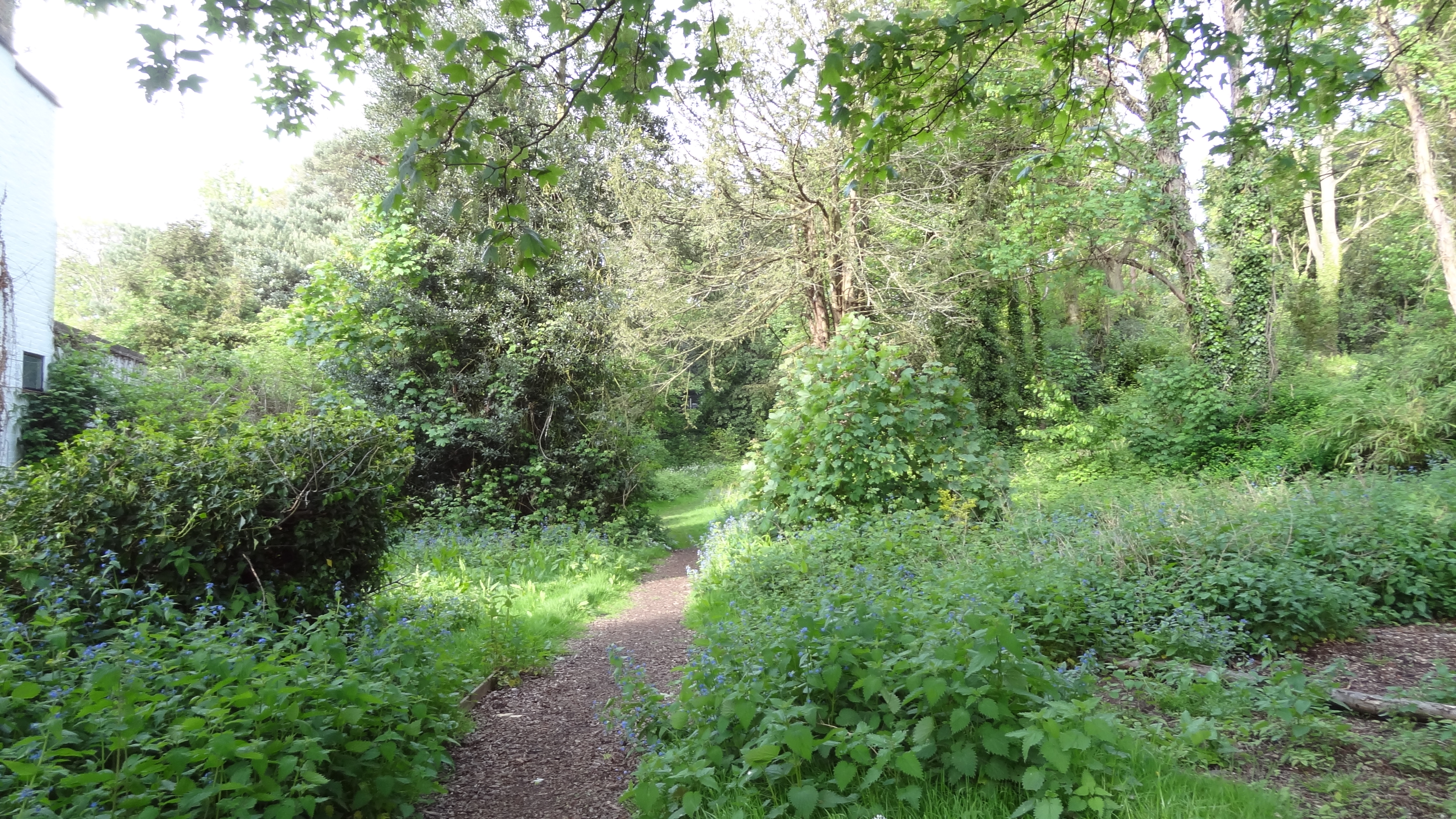
The Wood

The Wood is a public park in Surbiton in the Royal Borough of Kingston upon Thames in London. Part of it is a bird sanctuary named after the naturalist Richard Jefferies. The 1.5-hectare (3.7-acre) site is designated as a Local Nature Reserve called 'The Wood and Richard Jefferies Bird Sanctuary'.

The Woods was a nineteenth-century house which had a lake and woods in its grounds. In the 1930s the house was demolished, and in 1947 Surbiton Council compulsorily purchased the site and turned it into a park. In 1980 the upper part of the park was fenced off to form a bird sanctuary.

The site is wooded, and has typical woodland birds such as great spotted woodpeckers and tawny owls. Invertebrates include stag beetles.

There is access from Oak Hill Grove.
