= The Spinney Local Nature Reserve =

Nature reserve in England

Coordinates: 51.3752°N 0.1621°W

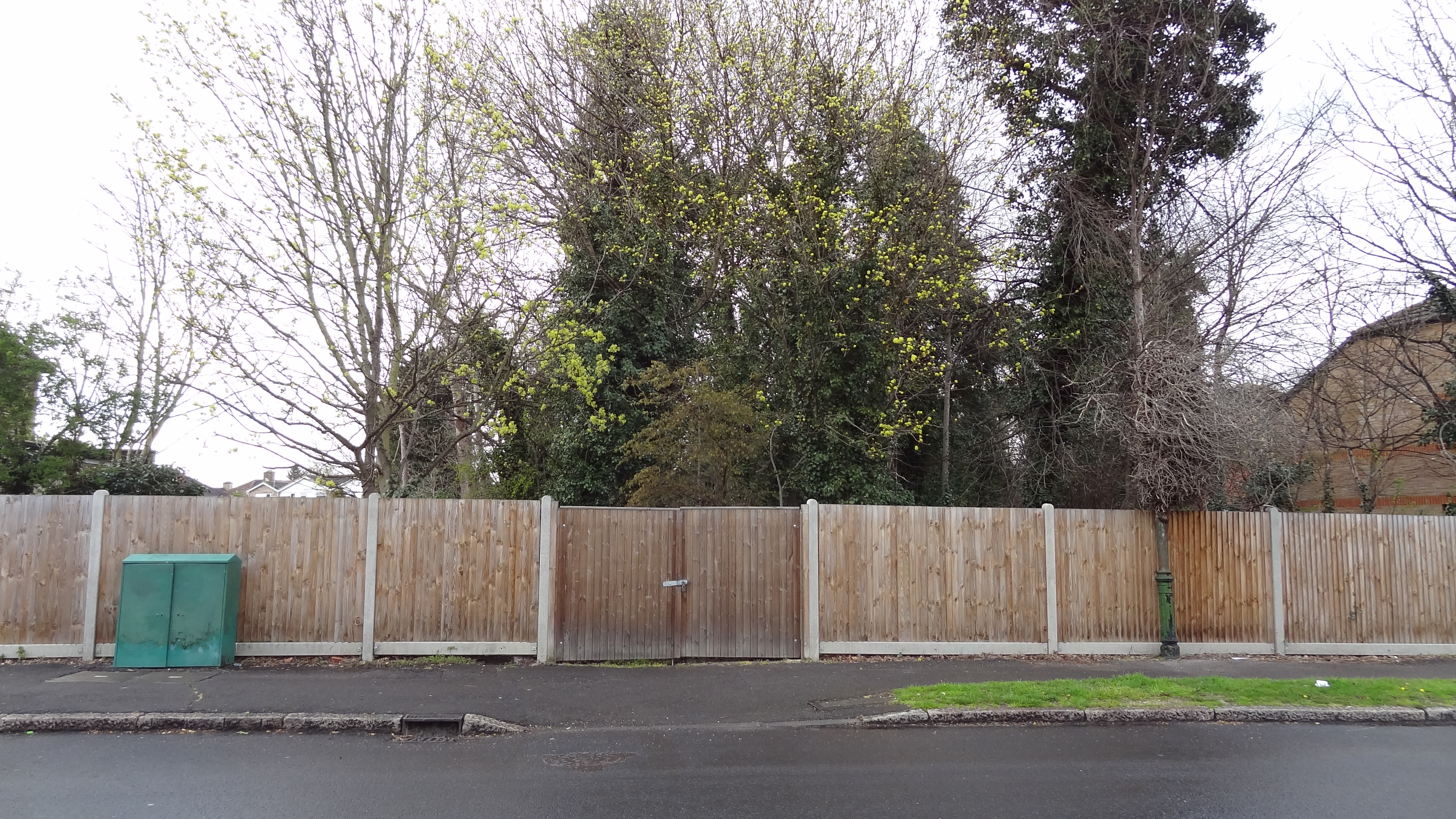
The locked entrance to The Spinney

The Spinney, Carshalton (or Nightingale Road Bird Sanctuary) is a 0.4 hectare local nature reserve in Carshalton in the London Borough of Sutton, England. It is owned by Sutton Council and managed by the council and Sutton Nature Conservation Volunteers. It used to be managed by the London Wildlife Trust.

The L-shaped reserve is a mixture of woodland and scrub, with the main trees being plane and elm. Breeding birds include dunnocks, wrens and blackbirds. Other animals include wood boring beetles and foxes. An unusual plant is butcher's broom.

The entrance in Nightingale Road is kept locked and there is no public access.
