= Westbere Copse =

Local nature reserve in West Hampstead, England

Coordinates: 51.5527°N 0.2060°W

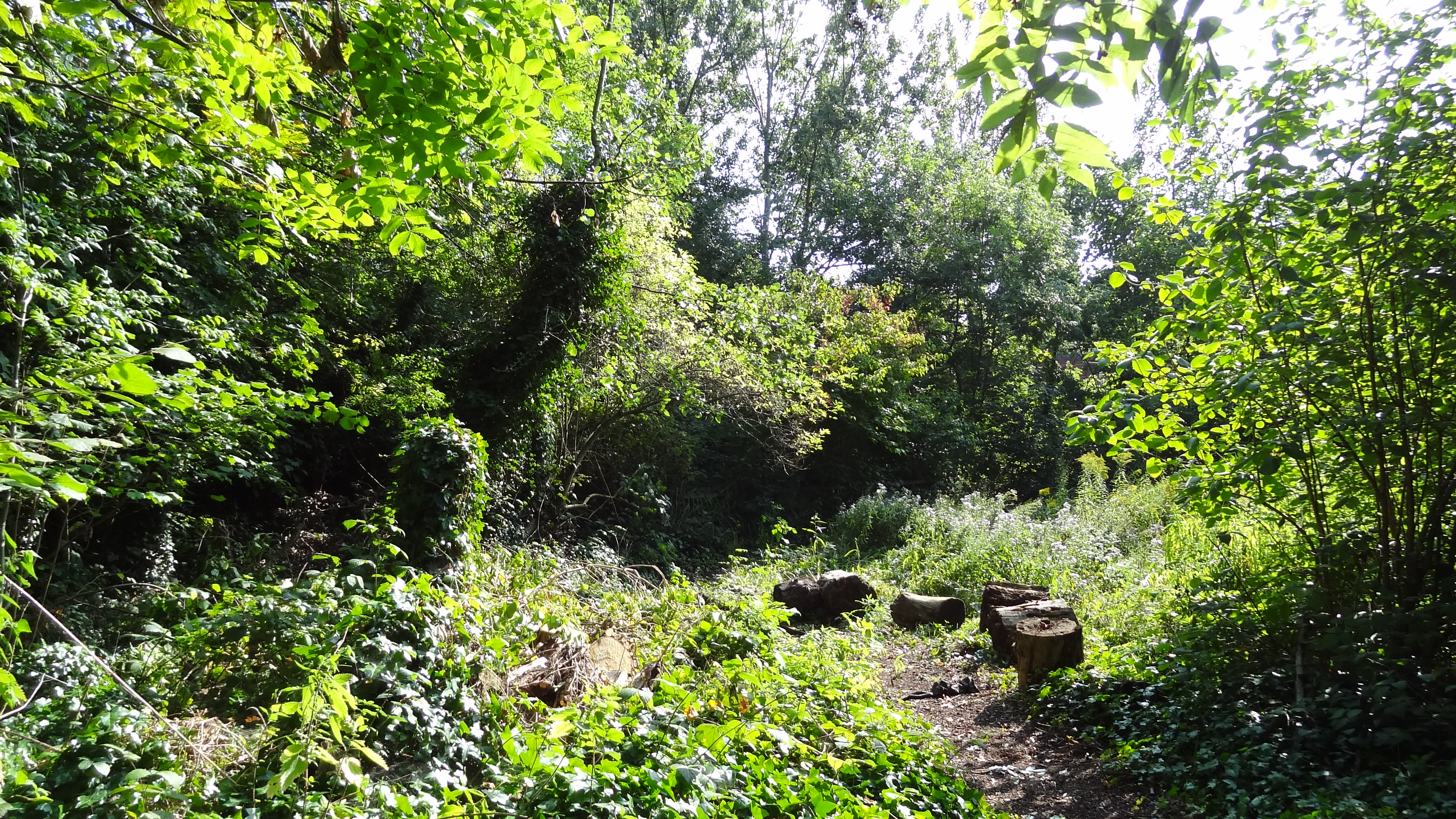

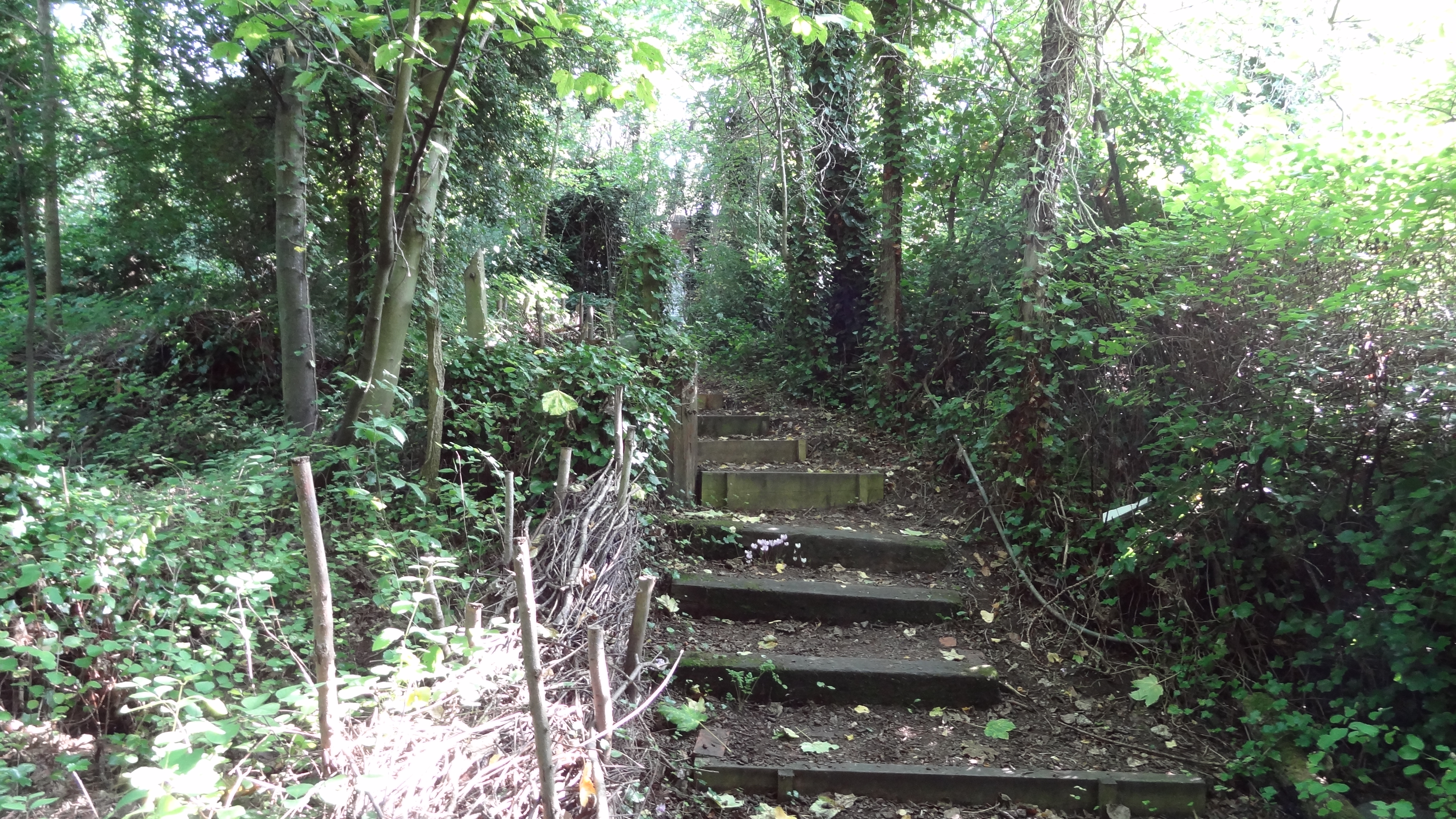

Westbere Copse is an eight hectares (20 acres) Local Nature Reserve and Site of Borough Importance for Nature Conservation, Grade 1, in West Hampstead in the London Borough of Camden. It is located at the corner of Westbere Road and Minster Road, next to the railway. The site is owned by Network Rail and is leased to Camden Council for use as a nature reserve. The nature reserve is composed of Westbere Copse itself, sections of railside, and an old orchard at Medley Gardens. There is no access to the railway land or the orchard. Westbere Copse is divided into a northern half which has free public access and a southern half, called Jenny Wood Nature Reserve, which is named after one of the founders of the site who died in 1988. This is only open at weekends.

== Wildlife ==
The site is mainly woodland, with the main trees being sycamore oak, aspen and ash. The understorey is composed of snowberry, elder, elm, blackthorn and hawthorn, with ground plants which are tolerant of shade such as cow parsley, nettles and ivy. 25 species of birds and 150 of plants have been recorded at the site, and it also has frogs, toads and newts. Conservation work is carried out the Westbere Copse Association.
