= Pevensey Road Nature Reserve =

Nature reserve in Hanworth, London, England

Coordinates: 51.4476°N 0.3897°W

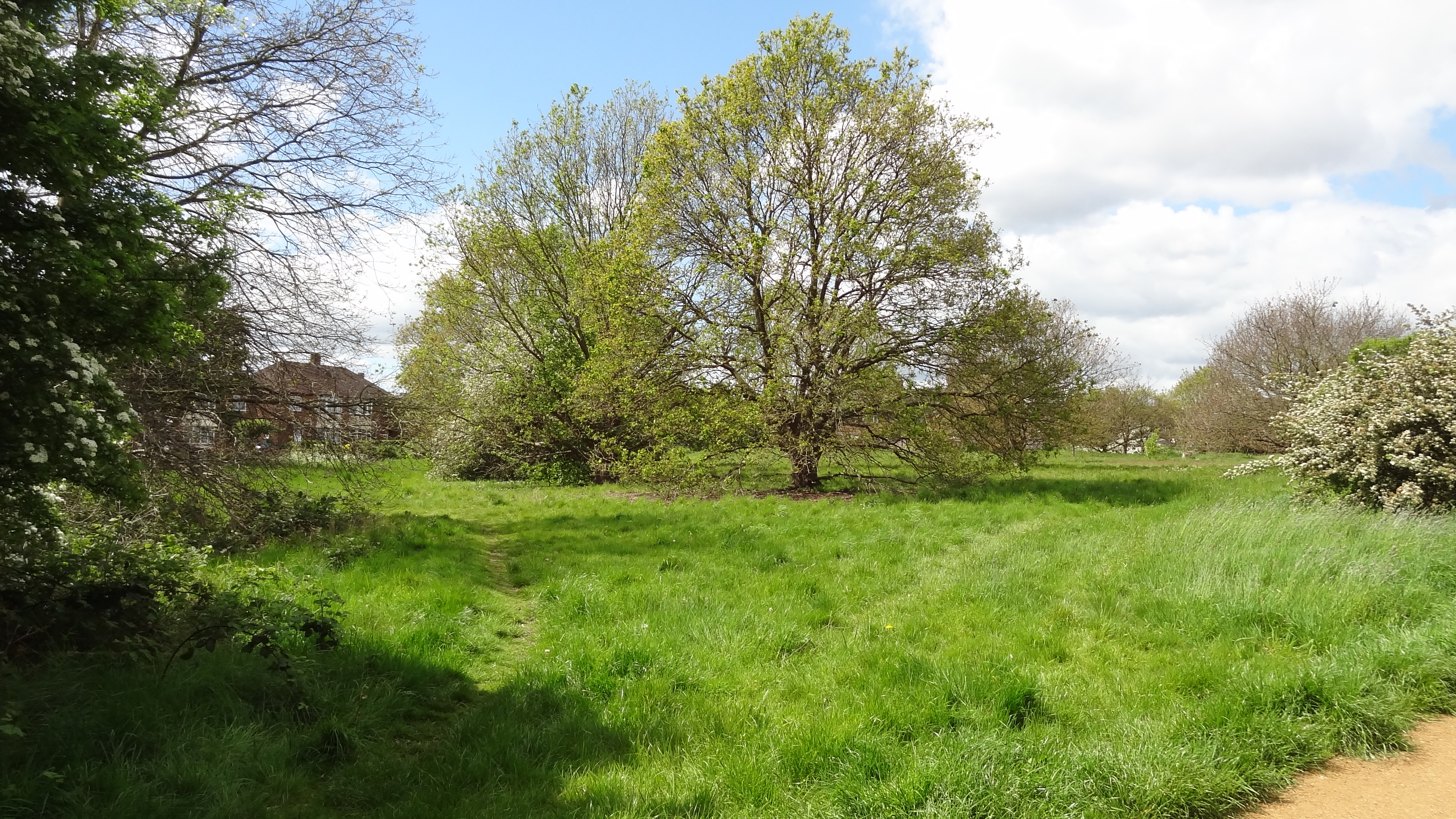

Pevensey Road is a 10.2 hectare Local Nature Reserve in Hanworth in the London Borough of Hounslow. It is also part of the Crane Corridor Site of Metropolitan Importance for Nature Conservation. It is owned and managed by Hounslow Council.

The site surrounds the South West Middlesex Crematorium on three sides. There are entrances to the main area on Pevensey Road and Hounslow Road. Another entrance on Hounslow Road, north of the crematorium, leads to an area separated from the rest of the site by impenetrable scrub; this also leads to a footpath along the River Crane. There are areas of meadow, woodlands and wetlands.

Since 2013 The Conservation Volunteers have been helping to manage Pevensey Road Nature Reserve for the benefit of wildlife. The organisation runs weekly Green Gym sessions which involve local people carrying out practical management of the site.

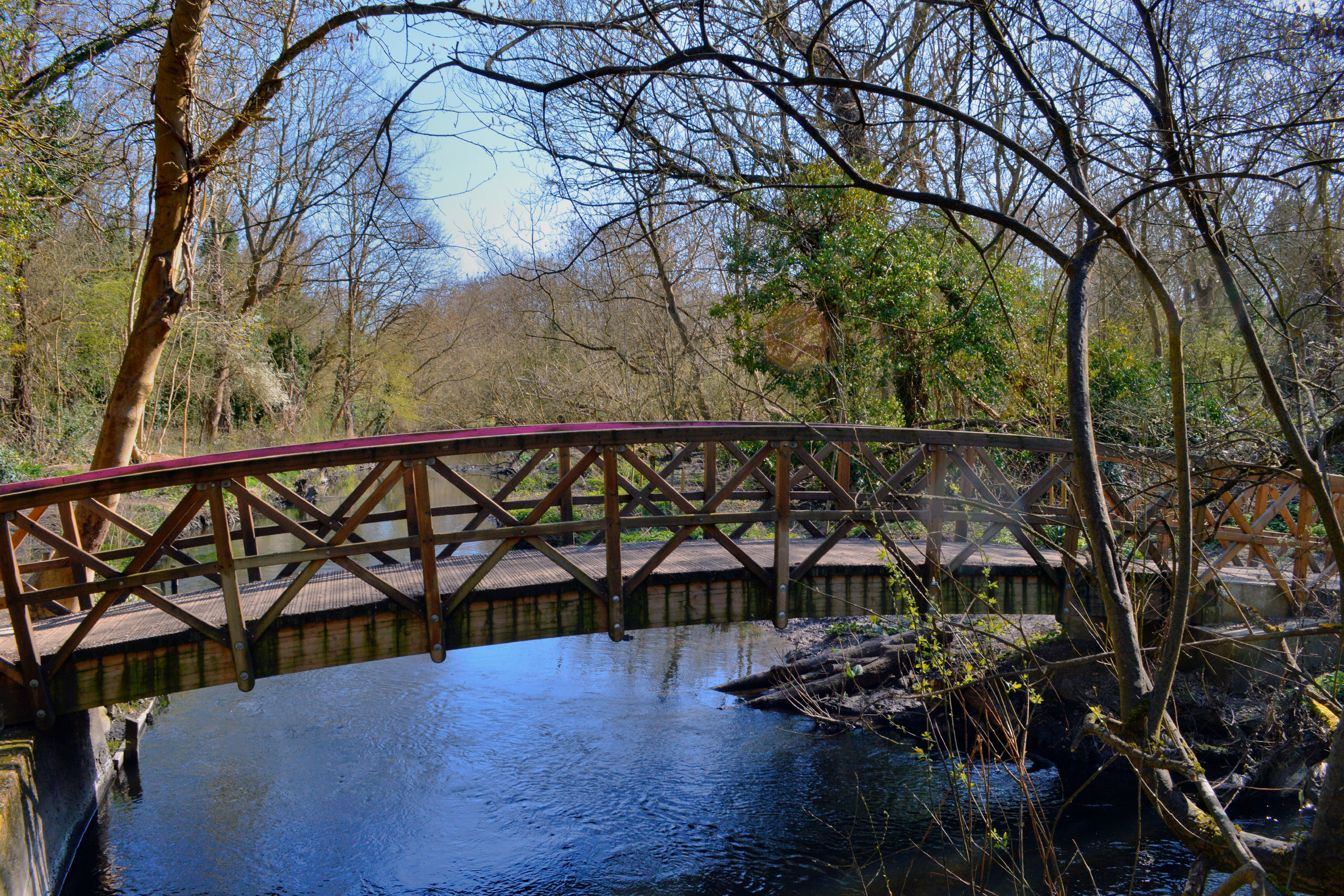
New bridge

In 2019 a new wooden bridge was erected over the river Crane connecting Pevensey Road Nature Reserve to Little Park.
