= Pinn (surname) =

Pinn is a surname. Notable people with the surname include:

- Anthony B. Pinn, American professor
- Petra Pinn (1881–1958), American nurse
- Robert Pinn (1841–1911), American Medal of Honor recipient
- Roy L. Pinn (1888–1950), American politician from Wisconsin
- Traverse Benjamin Pinn Sr. (1840–1888), American civic leader and inventor
- Vivian Pinn (born 1941), American physician and pathologist

== See also ==
- PINN (disambiguation)
- Pinn Island
- River Pinn
