= John Wesley Cromwell Jr. =

American educator and accountant (1883–1971)

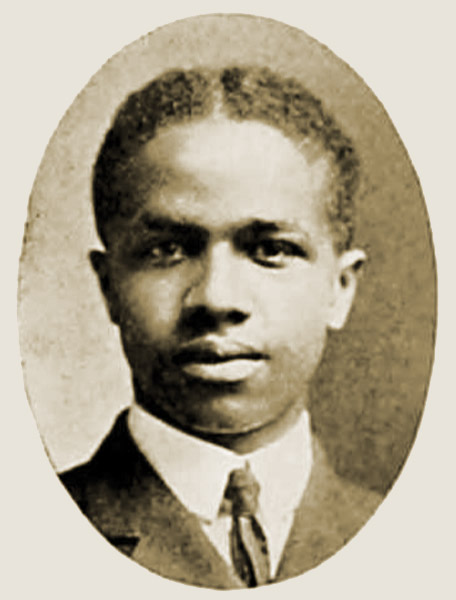
- John Wesley Cromwell Jr. in 1906
- Born: September 2, 1883; Washington, D.C., U.S.
- Died: December 16, 1971 (aged 88); Washington, D.C., U.S.
- Burial place: Lincoln Memorial Cemetery
- Education: Dartmouth College (AB, MA)
- Occupations: Accountant, educator
- Spouse: Yetta Mavritte (m. 1918; div. 1945)
- Children: Adelaide M. Cromwell
- Parent(s): Lucy McGuinn and John Wesley Cromwell
- Relatives: Otelia Cromwell (sister)

John Wesley Cromwell Jr. (September 2, 1883 – December 16, 1971) was an American educator and accountant. He was the first Black certified public accountant (CPA) in the United States.

== Early life and education ==
John Wesley Cromwell Jr. was born on September 2, 1883, in Washington, D.C., to parents John Wesley Cromwell Sr. and Lucy McGuinn; his sister was the writer Otelia Cromwell. In 1851, Cromwell Jr.'s grandfather, Willis H. Cromwell, purchased his family's freedom from slavery in Virginia and relocated them to Philadelphia. His son, John Wesley Cromwell Sr., went on to become a prominent lawyer, historian, journalist, and civil rights activist; he also published The People's Advocate in the late 19th century. Cromwell Jr. attended the preparatory department of Howard University before attending Dartmouth College, where he specialized in mathematics and astronomy. He graduated with honors in 1906 and earned a Master of Arts degree in 1907. While at Dartmouth, he joined the Omega Psi Phi fraternity, received the Thayer Prize in Mathematics, and was elected to the Phi Beta Kappa honor society.

== Career ==
After graduating from Dartmouth, Cromwell Jr. returned to Washington, D.C., where he taught German, Latin, and mathematics at Paul Laurence Dunbar High School from 1907 to 1930. He also developed an interest in accounting and began independent study in the field. In 1921, Cromwell Jr. took and passed the New Hampshire certified public accounting exam, becoming the first Black certified public accountant (CPA) in the United States. Unlike many other states, New Hampshire did not have an experience requirement for CPA licensure at the time. These experience requirements often posed a barrier for Black Americans seeking to enter the profession due to limited access to employment opportunities within established accounting firms.

After receiving his CPA license, Cromwell continued to teach while also establishing his own accounting practice in Washington, D.C. His clientele primarily consisted of Black-owned businesses and organizations in the Washington, D.C. area, including churches, restaurants, and funeral homes. From 1930 to 1933, Cromwell Jr. served as comptroller of Howard University. Following his role as comptroller, he engaged in private accounting practice until his retirement in 1956. He was a member of both the American Institute of Accountants and the American Mathematical Society.

== Personal life ==
In 1918, Cromwell Jr. married Yetta Mavritte, a cousin of Senator Edward Brooke of Massachusetts. The marriage ended in divorce in 1945. Their daughter, Adelaide M. Cromwell, pursued a career in academia, becoming a professor of sociology at Boston University.

Cromwell Jr. was an avid bridge player and participated in the establishment of the American Bridge Association in 1932. This organization was formed in response to the prevailing exclusion of Black players from organized bridge tournaments at the time.

John Wesley Cromwell Jr. died at his residence in Washington, D.C., on December 16, 1971, at the age of 88.

== See also ==
- Timeline of African-American firsts
