= River Pinn =

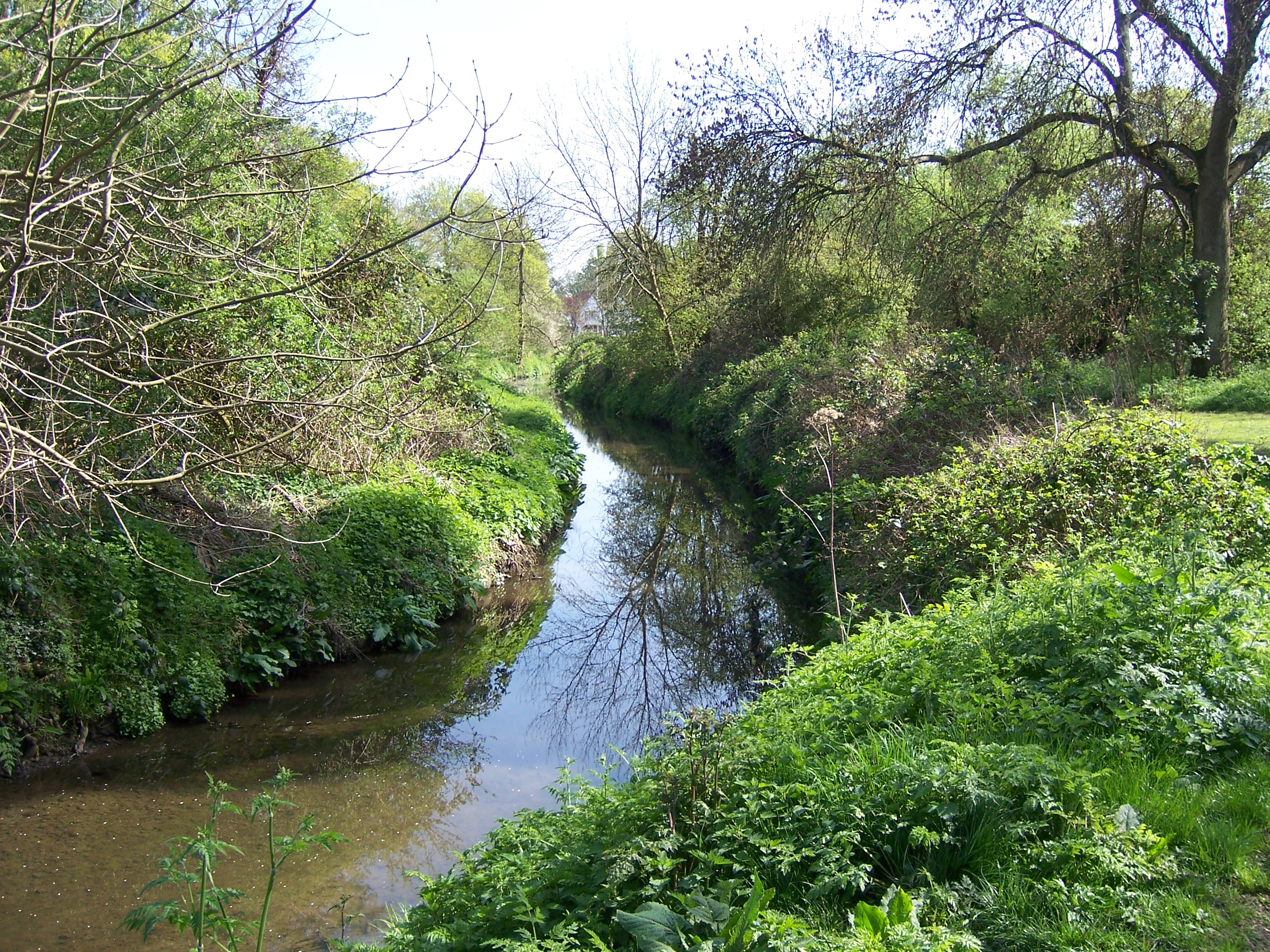
- River Pinn at Ickenham

- River Pinn (London Borough of Hillingdon) River Pinn (England)

Location
- Country: England
- Region: Greater London

Physical characteristics
- Source
  - location: 51°37′12.5″N 0°20′54.1″W
  - elevation: Roughly 120 m (390 ft)
- Mouth
  - location: 51°30′52″N 0°28′48″W
  - elevation: 31 m (102 ft)

Basin features
- Progression: Pinn → Colne → Thames

The Pinn is a suburban, outer west London river. It has dendritic headwaters, the furthest is considered its source – in Harrow Weald. Its confluence with Frays River makes it a tributary of the Colne. It is one of three principal rivers wholly in the historic county of Middlesex. (Note: The others are the Brent and Crane)

== Route ==
The river runs through Pinner, the northern halves of Eastcote and Ruislip: the latter may be a notable rise-lip of land as 17th century maps often have the place name but likely derives from "rush leap" from the local width of the river. It then runs through Ickenham and on to Uxbridge, where it passes through the former grounds of RAF Uxbridge and Brunel University. The Pinn continues on to Pield Heath and Cowley, passing under the Grand Union canal before joining the Frays River, an anabranch of the Colne, at Yiewsley.

During the Second World War only, the Pinn was dammed near Pinner High Street for water for putting out fires from air raids.

The middle and lower thirds of the course are between the Colne and Crane, all flowing south, thus making up parallel drainage.

== Celandine Route ==
This is a 12-mile (19 km) walk through woodland, meadows and parks. It finishes at the Grand Union Canal towpath parallel to the Fray's River anabranch of the Colne.

=== Connections ===
A short walk east along the Slough Arm of the Grand Union Canal connects.

The Grand Union Canal towpath connects, linking in Brentford (east south-east), Watford and the Midlands (north), and the Paddington Arm (central London, east).

== Water quality ==
All local sewerage runs to the distant Mogden Sewage Treatment Works discharging its treated waters to the Tideway. This spares the Pinn from the incident nitrogen, bleach (ammonia) and other chemical biohazards which many of its catchment homes and business use and/or discharge.

The Pinn's flow is weak save for after moderate or heavy rain. Worn tyre and motor oil run-off is from some roadside drains at biohazardous levels, particularly below the A40 road which is a trunk route of six lanes at this point (this becomes the M40 motorway to the west) – about 0.62 miles (1 km) of this slopes down to the river.

== See also ==
- List of rivers of England
