= Colne Valley Regional Park =

Area in Hertfordshire and Buckinghamshire

Coordinates: 51.539°N 0.529°W

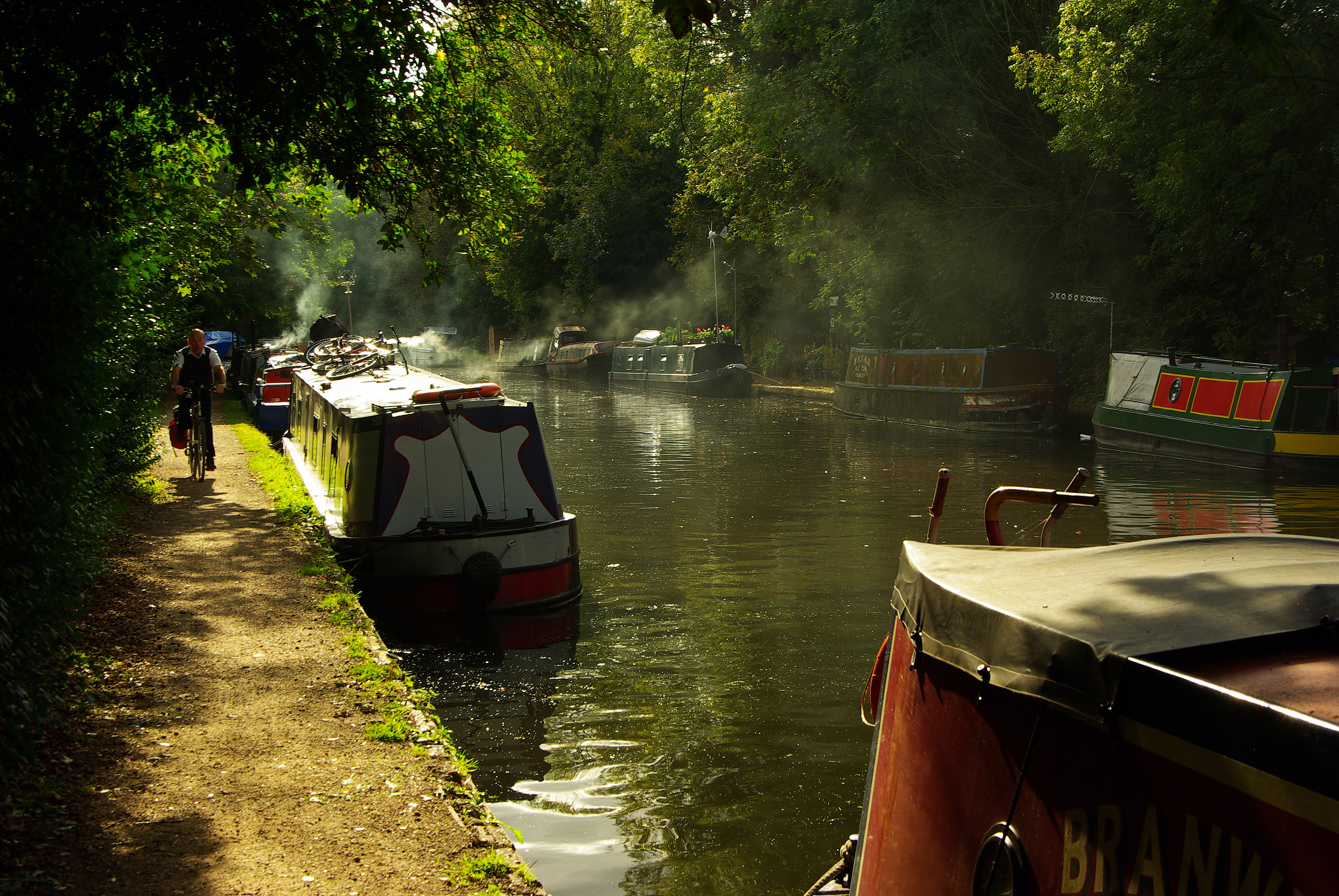
The Grand Union Canal is within the park.

The Colne Valley Regional Park is 43 square miles (110 km^{2}) of parks, green spaces and reservoirs alongside the often multi-channel River Colne and parallel Grand Union Canal, mainly in Hertfordshire and Buckinghamshire, with parts in the London Borough of Hillingdon, Berkshire and a small area in Surrey.

== Geography ==
Much of the landscape is relatively flat – the lower reach of the Colne forming the centre of the park. Almost all the land is only 16 to 42 m (52 to 138 ft) AOD, with a mixture of soils, including occasionally wet, loamy soils and clayey soils, and a small amount of naturally slightly acid heath. Passing through the park is the Colne Valley Trail or Colne Valley Way, which forms a major section of the London Loop and connects to the Hertfordshire Way north of Watford.

East of the village of Denham, and west of the villages of Cowley and Harefield, and the town of Uxbridge, the Colne Valley regional park contains a mixture of farmland, woodland and water, 50 miles (80 km) of river and canal and over forty lakes, which help to regulate the flow of the major Thames tributary and provide fish for angling. The park is a regionally important place of recreation and is internationally important for wildlife. Large areas are open to the public or accessible through a network of paths.

Paths stretch from Staines in the south to Rickmansworth in the north through the alluvial meadows in the valley of the River Colne. Popular attractions include Black Park, Chiltern Open Air Museum and the conservation area of Little Britain by the Grand Union Canal, Cowley. This regional park also includes the Metropolitan Site of Importance for Nature Conservation (SINC) designated by London called the Lower Colne, that supports rare aquatic plant species and includes Harmondsworth Moor Country Park.

Elevations nearby range from 90 metres (300 ft) AOD on steep hillsides in Harefield, Denham and Rickmansworth, to 16 metres (52 ft) at Staines Moor.

In the south, the area includes Staines Moor, the Staines Reservoirs and the King George VI Reservoir. The reservoirs support nationally important wintering populations of tufted ducks, pochard, goosander and goldeneye.

== Impact of development ==
Being situated on the edge of London, the park is threatened by many proposed developments. The park has claimed it is "fighting for its life."

The park is already crossed by three motorways: the M4, M25, and the M40.

The park is threatened by the possibility of the Expansion of Heathrow Airport. The park has said "a huge area of the southern third of the Park will be lost. In addition to the new runway itself, there will be associated taxiways, hotels, car parks, warehousing, and offices."

High Speed 2 will pass through the north of the park on the 2.1 miles (3.4 km) long Colne Valley Viaduct. The viaduct is designed to resemble the flight of a stone skipping across the water. In October 2017, activists set up a protest camp at Harvil Road to oppose the construction. The protesters documented alleged environmental damage by HS2 workers over an eighteen-month period, voicing concern about the destruction of wildlife habitats and the possibility that an aquifer supplying drinking water might be affected. In relation to water quality HS2 has stated "Over the last six years, HS2 has worked closely with Affinity Water and the Environment Agency to monitor water quality and agree working methods.These will be monitored by a team of specialist engineers during construction in order to protect the natural environment." In May 2019, the Woodland Trust called for the clearance of trees at Colne Valley to be halted while the project was under review. In January 2020, HS2 began evicting the protest camps. A couple living in a farmhouse on the route of the railway lost a seven-year legal battle in July 2020 and were compelled to move out after HS2 Ltd compulsorily purchased their home on Dews Lane. The first of the viaducts piers was cast in December 2021.

The park also believes it is threatened by other proposals including motorway service stations, ‘technology parks’, Pinewood theme park and housing.

== Sub-areas ==
The park includes Denham Country Park, which is a Local Nature Reserve, and Frays Farm Meadows and Denham Lock Wood, which are Sites of Special Scientific Interest managed as nature reserves by the London Wildlife Trust.

Colne Valley Park
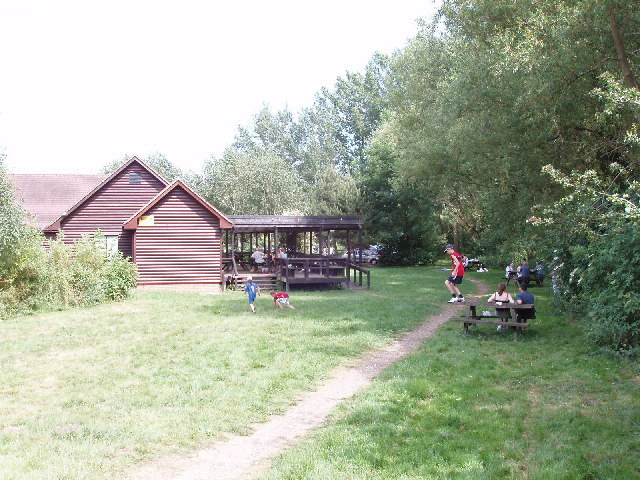
Colne Valley Park Visitor Centre, Denham

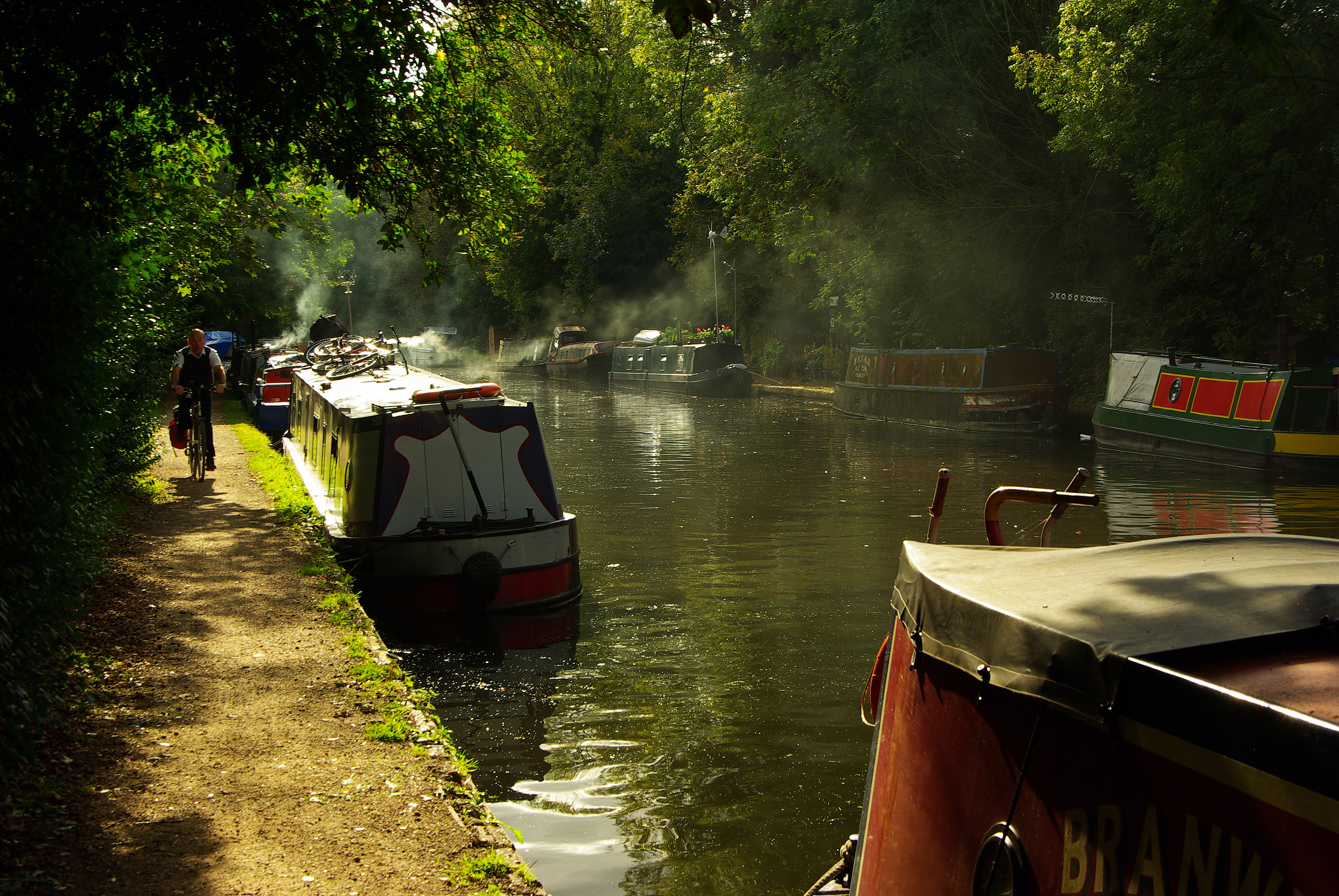
Cowley Lock in Autumn mist, one of two conservation areas in Cowley (Note: Under creative commons licence by Julian Osley).

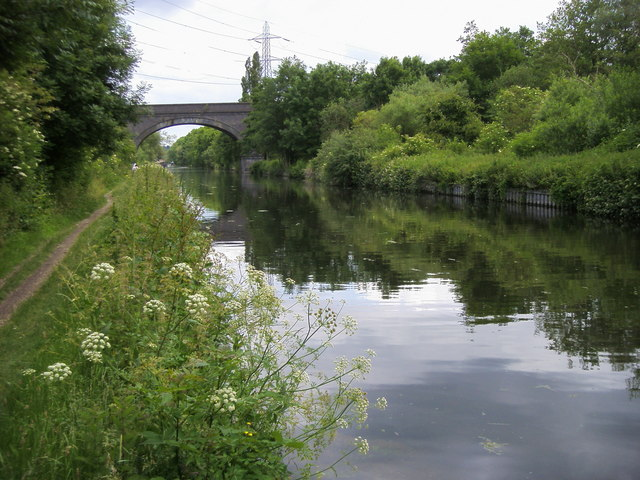
Grand Union Canal by Denham and South Harefield.

== Notes and references ==
Notes
