= Frays Farm Meadows =

Protected area in Greater London, England

Coordinates: 51.5639°N 0.4765°W

- Site of Special Scientific Interest
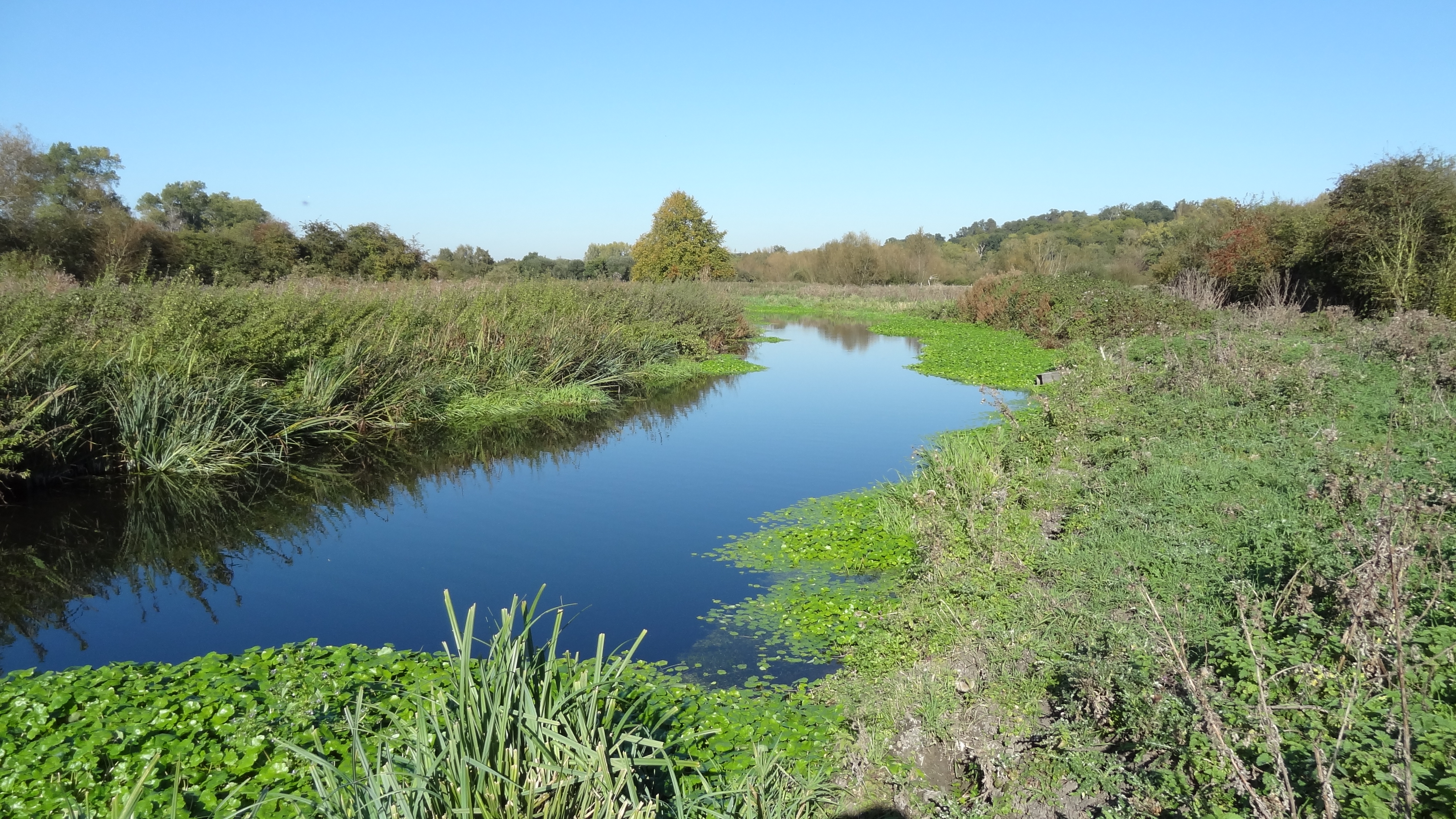
- Frays River in Frays Farm Meadows
- Location of Frays Farm Meadows.
- Area of search: Greater London
- Grid reference: TQ057861
- Interest: Biological
- Area: 28.2 ha (70 acres)
- Notification date: 1984
- Location map: Magic Map

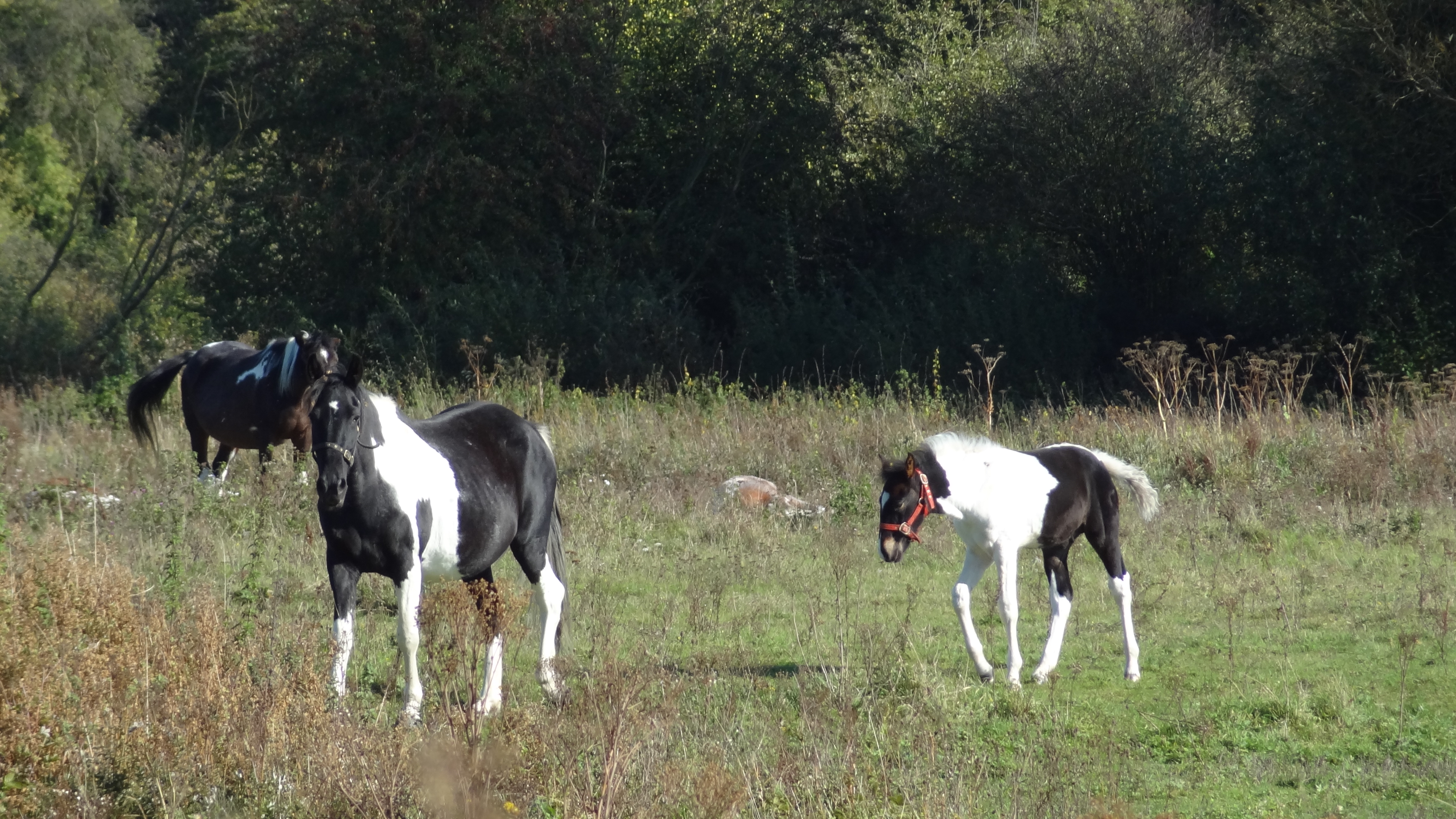
Horses in western field

Frays Farm Meadows is a 28.2-hectare (70-acre) biological Site of Special Scientific Interest near Denham in the London Borough of Hillingdon. Subsequently, it was notified as an SSSI in 1981, and has been managed by the London Wildlife Trust on behalf of Hillingdon Council since 1999. It is part of the Colne Valley Regional Park.

Frays Farm Meadows are a set of fields bounded on the south by the A40 road and on the west by the Grand Union Canal. The Frays River goes north through the site before turning west toward an old railway embankment that runs north from the A40, dividing the site into three parts: the western fields, the area between the embankment and the river, and the fields east and north of the river. The site is accessible to the public apart from fields on both sides of the embankment. Access to the western fields is by a stile on the eastern bank of the canal at Denham Lock. From there a path through Denham Lock Wood (another SSSI run by London Wildlife Trust, north-west of the Meadows) gives access to the northern and eastern fields.

Frays Farm Meadows provide a window on the medieval world, never having been intensively farmed. They are one of the few remaining examples of unimproved wet alluvial grassland in Greater London and the Colne Valley. The linear features, river, embankment, ditches, and hedges contribute to the rich diversity of plants and animals. Cows and horses graze in order to improve conditions by churning up the ground and encouraging pooling of water. Mammals on site include the nationally endangered water vole, and there are birds such as snipe, cuckoos, and a barn owl. Plants include marsh horsetail, ragged robin and arrowhead.

Frays Valley Local Nature Reserve partly covers the same area as the SSSI.

== See also ==
- List of Local Nature Reserves in Greater London
- List of Sites of Special Scientific Interest in Greater London
