= Cowley, London =

Suburban village in the United Kingdom

Cowley
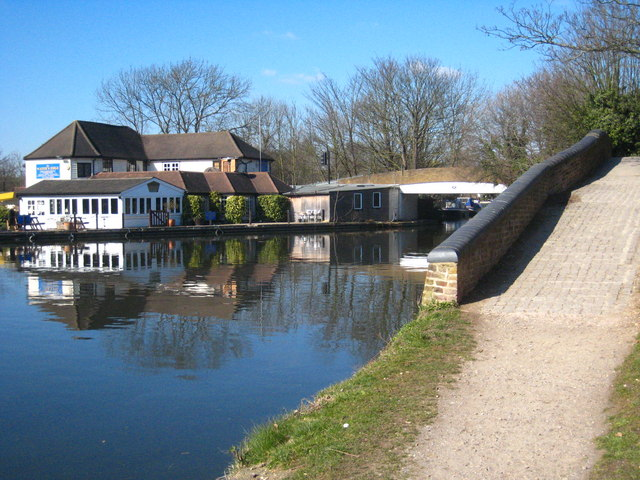
- The Water's Edge restaurant, Cowley Peachey

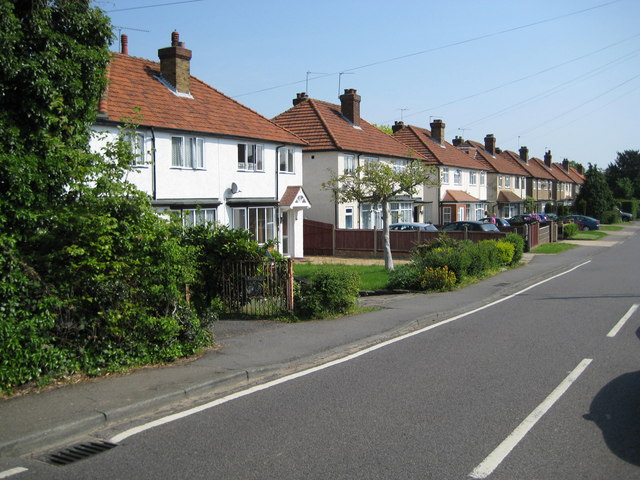
- Cowley

- Location within Greater London
- Population: 8,776
- OS grid reference: TQ055825
  - Charing Cross: 15.4 mi (24.8 km) E
- London borough: Hillingdon
- Ceremonial county: Greater London
- Region: London
- Country: England
- Sovereign state: United Kingdom
- Post town: UXBRIDGE
- Postcode district: UB8
- Dialling code: 01895
- Police: Metropolitan
- Fire: London
- Ambulance: London
- UK Parliament: Uxbridge and South Ruislip
- London Assembly: Ealing and Hillingdon

Cowley /ˈkaʊli/ is a village contiguous with the town of Uxbridge in the London Borough of Hillingdon. A largely suburban village with 16 listed buildings, Cowley is 15.4 miles (24.8 km) west of Charing Cross, bordered to the west by Uxbridge Moor in the Green Belt and the River Colne, forming the border with Buckinghamshire. Cowley was an ancient parish in the historic county of Middlesex.

== Toponymy ==
Cowley's name is believed to be derived from the Anglo-Saxon Cofenlea: "Cofa's woodland clearing." The earliest written record of the settlement is from 959.

== History ==
=== Medieval period ===
St. Laurence Church was recorded as lying within the parish of Cowley in the 1086 Domesday Book along with the parish land owned by Westminster Abbey, valued as worth to its lord two pounds per year in 1066 and at one pound ten shillings in 1086. Its independent male householders were two villagers (Note: See villein (feudal)), one cottage-owner (Note: See Cottar) with one cultivated ploughland for one lord's plough team. Lord's lands (also referred to as a manorial park) took up 1.5 ploughs of land, and meadow land half a plough. The woodland was worth forty pigs (per year) and a mill was worth for five shillings per year.

Cowley was surrounded by Hillingdon parish, of which the town of Uxbridge itself and Uxbridge Moor, which separated Cowley from Buckinghamshire on the west, formed part. Part of the Moor is now the M25 motorway. Within the triangle formed where the River Pinn and Fray's River meet, Cowley parish was so intermixed with Hillingdon that parts of it were entirely detached from the rest, while other parts, some detached, lay farther east across the Pinn. For this reason most of the general history of the parish has to be dissected from that of Hillingdon. These complex parish borders were those of just one manor carved out before the Norman Conquest from Hillingdon. While Hillingdon parish administered to many areas now in Cowley, most of these were in one manor within Hillingdon whose name is preserved by few places in maps, Colham.

In the west, along the main road between Uxbridge and Yiewsley, and mostly to the north of the Iver Lane turning, lay the village formerly known as Cowley Street, mostly in Cowley parish. This hamlet and the church hamlet formed the main areas of settlement within the parish, though there were a few houses elsewhere, including some at what is now called Cowley Peachey, the southern part of Cowley. In 1252 Charter Rolls show that Bartholomew Peche (or Pecche), a favourite of Henry III was granted tenancy of Westminster Abbey's estate in Cowley. The Peche family held the manor for over a hundred years and by 1358 its name had become Couele Peche (Cowley Peachey). This was first recorded in the Calendar of Inquisitions post mortem.

== Post-Reformation and boundaries ==
A map of Cowley in 1868

Before 1882, when the first important changes were made in its boundaries, the parish of Cowley spanned 300 acres (120 ha) extremely irregularly shaped but mostly south of Uxbridge, between Frays River (the county boundary, part of the braided Colne) on the west and the River Pinn, which runs into it on the east. A small piece (2 acres (0.81 ha)) of glebe land belonged to Cowley church on the other side of Hillingdon by Long Lane.

In 1796 Cowley Field was inclosed, with the statutory object of consolidating the parishes of Hillingdon and Cowley. As a result, Cowley received several blocks of land, of which the largest were connected to the part of the parish by the church and to the part at Cowley Street by roads which the Commissioners decreed were to be repaired by Cowley parish and which therefore became part of it. Four parts of the field north of the Greenway were also assigned to Cowley but remained detached (nos. 1–4 on the map), and so did two others farther south by the High Street and by Maygoods Lane (nos. 5–6). Nomansland (no. 7), across the Pinn, also remained cut off from the rest of the parish, while the little field of glebe nearly 2 miles away in Long Lane (no. 8) was unaffected by the award.

In 1547 the parish contained 36 'houseling' people, in 1719 there were 109 inhabitants, and in 1801 the population was 214. The small cluster of homes at the village centre and dispersal of parishioners based on the old, medieval scope of the manor's lands meant a low sense of community and identity especially for outlying owners. Furthermore, some fields and orchards of Cowley had become additions to plots falling in Hillingdon so tithes would be the only ties left if plot holders lived in houses on Hillingdon land. The manorial court for many centuries made regulations and byelaws about fencing and grazing of the open fields, pasture meadows, and commons, particularly as to the stinting of animals.

== Industrial Revolution ==
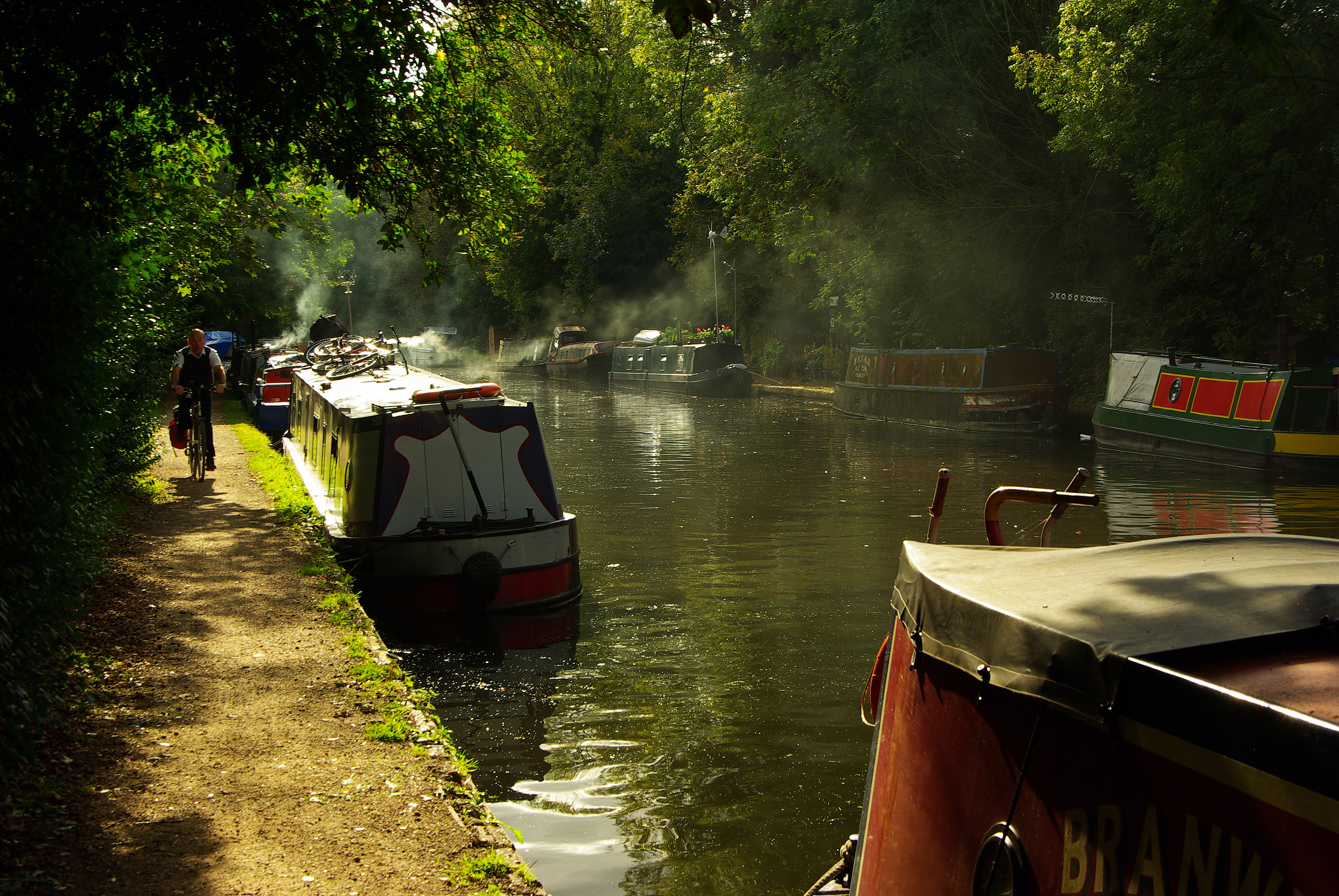
The Grand Union Canal near Cowley Lock (Note: Under creative commons licence by Julian Osley)

=== The Grand Junction Canal ===
On 3 November 1794 the Grand Junction Canal was opened from the River Thames at Brentford to Uxbridge, routing on the western side of Cowley Peachey and Cowley Street. Construction began with cuttings Uxbridge Moor on 1 May 1793 and in early May at Brentford and Braunston. However toll collectors weren't appointed at Uxbridge and Brentford until May 1795. It is likely the aqueduct over the Fray's River at Cowley Lock wasn't completed until the Autumn of 1795 with measures undertaken there to allow traffic to pass through there. With the opening of the canal's Paddington Arm on 10 July 1801 packet boats drawn by four horses ran from Paddington Basin on the edge of London to the 'turning point' docks at Cowley Peachey. Packet Boat Lane and the former Paddington Packet Boat public house, licensed in 1804, reflect this period.

=== Cowley Stock Bricks ===
The opening of the Grand Junction Canal enabled the development of the brick industry in Cowley. In December 1810 twenty-one acres of land adjoining the canal calculated to contain brick earth sufficient to make from sixty to seventy million bricks was offered for let. Four hundred yards south of Cowley Lock a 350 yard arm of the Grand Union Canal called Cowley Hall Dock was opened in 1811 to service the Cowley Hall Brick-Field. Between March and October 1814 four million bricks were delivered from the brick-field. With this early development of Cowley's brick earth deposits the generic name of the brick in West Middlesex became known as the Cowley Stock Brick.

=== Great Western Railway Uxbridge branch line ===
In 1856 a Great Western Railway branch line opened, operating between West Drayton station in Yiewsley on the Great Western Main Line and Uxbridge Vine Street Station. The railway encouraged the development of Cowley becoming a centre of market and nursery-gardens, supplying fresh flowers to the markets at Covent Garden and Spitalfields. Although the line ran through Cowley a station was not constructed here until 1904. Cowley railway station closed in 1962 due to falling passenger demand. Station Road reflects the past station which was situated where Huxley Close is today.

Despite the spread of building from Uxbridge in the north, the beginnings of industry at Cowley Peachey and the three large mills just outside the western boundary of the parish, Cowley remained an almost entirely rural village until after World War I. In 1891, just before the parish was enlarged, the population was 322. In 1901, after the enlargement, it was 869, and this had only risen to 1,170 by 1931. During the 1930s there was a good deal of building, partly by Uxbridge council, and the population of the same area was 3,687 in 1951. Until 1965 a great many more houses were built, bringing the total provided by the council to nearly 1,000 in 1959, so that much of the area east of the main road and south of Station Road has been covered, though allotments remain between Hillingdon and Cowley. The diversion of Peachey Lane in 1938 and the blocking of Maygoods Lane about 1953 changed the old road plan of this part of the parish.

Cowley became part of the urban district of Uxbridge in 1929 and part of Uxbridge civil parish in 1937.

== Geology ==
Between the boundaries marked by the Pinn and Colne the soil is traditionally called (fertile) brick-earth which has medium permeability whereas east of the Pinn covering most of London is London clay and gravel, a mixture of good and poor drainage. On more descriptive modern analysis the soil is "slowly permeable seasonally wet acid loamy and clayey soil", with non-permeable loamy soil marking the lowest part.

== Geography ==
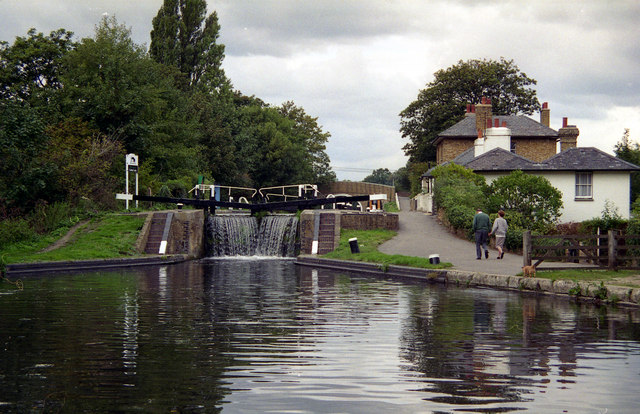
Cowley Lock, one of the two conservation areas in Cowley

Cowley lies on a southwest-sloping ridge 28 to 45 m (92 to 148 ft) above mean sea level and is a village contiguous with Uxbridge to the north with its own ecclesiastical parish church and once a civil parish. It is bordered to the west by the Metropolitan Green Belt, the River Colne and Buckinghamshire. To the south the River Pinn forms its boundary with Yiewsley and to the east with Hillingdon.

Two conservation areas are in the village: Cowley Lock and Cowley Church (St Laurence). Cowley Lock, designated in 1975, includes all of Old Mill Lane, Cowley Lake, wet woodland, Little Britain (Note: Little Britain comprises a lake, historic homes and a family public house), Cowley bridges, Packet Boat Lane and the Packet Boat turning area. Cowley Church (St. Laurence) Conservation area was designated in 1988 and includes the Church and nearby buildings and to the south, Manor Farm.

=== Little Britain Lake ===
Little Britain Lake (51°31′10″N 0°29′23″W) in the west of Cowley extends for about 450 metres between the Colne and a channel of it known as Frays River. The lake, which is in the Colne Valley Regional Park conservation area, is roughly the shape of the Great Britain. It is noted for less common water birds, such as gadwall and great crested grebe, and for more common species including mute swan and grey heron.

== Politics ==
Cowley is part of the Uxbridge and South Ruislip constituency for elections to the House of Commons.

Cowley is part of the Colham and Cowley ward for elections to Hillingdon London Borough Council.

On 1 April 1938 the civil parish was abolished and merged with Uxbridge. At the 1931 census (the last before the abolition of the parish), Cowley had a population of 1713.

== Landmarks ==
A number of older buildings survive, forming in Cowley all but one of the 15 architecturally listed buildings, the other being the main lecture building of Brunel University. Cowley House, and the Manor Farm are the most architecturally and historically significant. In the High Street, Old Vine Cottage, The Crown, and Maygood's Farm date from before 1700, and there are several detached 18th-century houses there, some of which may incorporate earlier work. At Cowley Peachey are two timber-framed houses: the Old Cottage probably dates from the 15th or early 16th century and is a three-bay house of which the central bay was originally an open hall. At some later date the hall was divided into two storeys and a brick chimney was inserted. The Malt Shovel in Iver Lane is also Grade II listed.

=== St Laurence Church ===
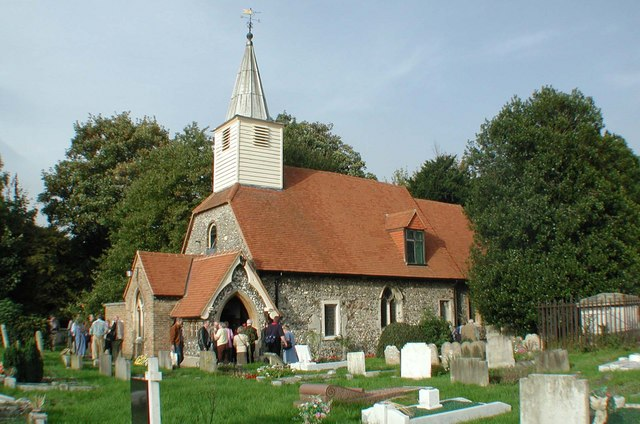
St Laurence Church

St Laurence Church is listed higher than all of the other buildings in Cowley architecturally, at Grade II*, this building was in existence by the 12th century and was the smallest Parish Church in Middlesex. It stands near the River Pinn and was on the eastern side of the Cowley Manor. There is no evidence historically of there being a settlement of any size here, though there were probably always one or two buildings beside the Church.

=== Brunel University ===
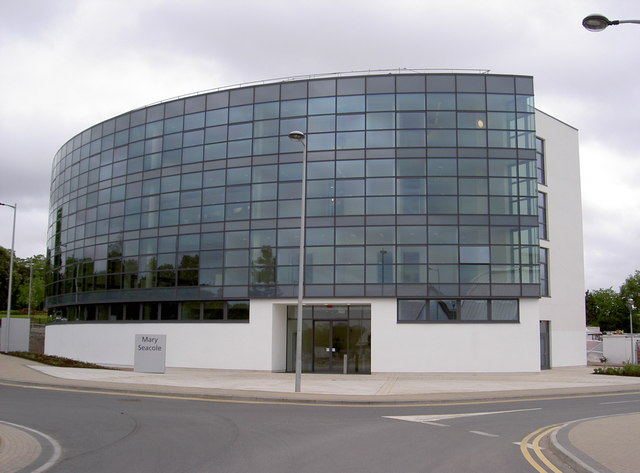
Mary Seacole Building, Brunel University

The main "Uxbridge campus" of the university is in the north east of Cowley.

== Transport ==
=== Nearest tube station ===
- Uxbridge (Metropolitan and Piccadilly lines) 1.3 miles (2.1 km).

=== Nearest railway stations ===
- West Drayton 1.1 miles (1.8 km)
- Iver 1.9 miles (3.1 km)

=== Buses ===
The 222 Metroline London buses route also serves Cowley, providing links to Uxbridge, Yiewsley and Hounslow

== Notable people ==
- Roger Williams (1603–1683), important early proponent of religious freedom and separation of church and state, was born in Cowley
- Barton Booth (1681–1733), one of the most famous actors of the early 18th century, lived and is buried in Cowley
- John Rich (1692–1761), the "father of English pantomime", lived in Cowley
- William Dodd (1729–1777), writer and clergyman, once royal chaplain, was buried in Cowley after being hanged at Tyburn
- Botanist John Lightfoot (1735–1788) lived in Uxbridge from 1767 and is buried here where he was curate from 1768 to 1786.
- England footballer Jim Taylor (1917–2001), born in Cowley
- Racing driver Robin Widdows (1942–), born in Cowley
- Natasha Baker (born 1989), Para-equestrian and double gold medallist at the 2012 Summer Paralympics, lives in Cowley. The main postbox in Uxbridge town centre was painted gold by Royal Mail in her honour, as was done for all Team GB and Paralympics GB gold medallists.

== Notes and references ==
Notes
