= Denham Lock Wood =

Site of Special Scientific Interest

Coordinates: 51.566°N 0.479°W

- Site of Special Scientific Interest
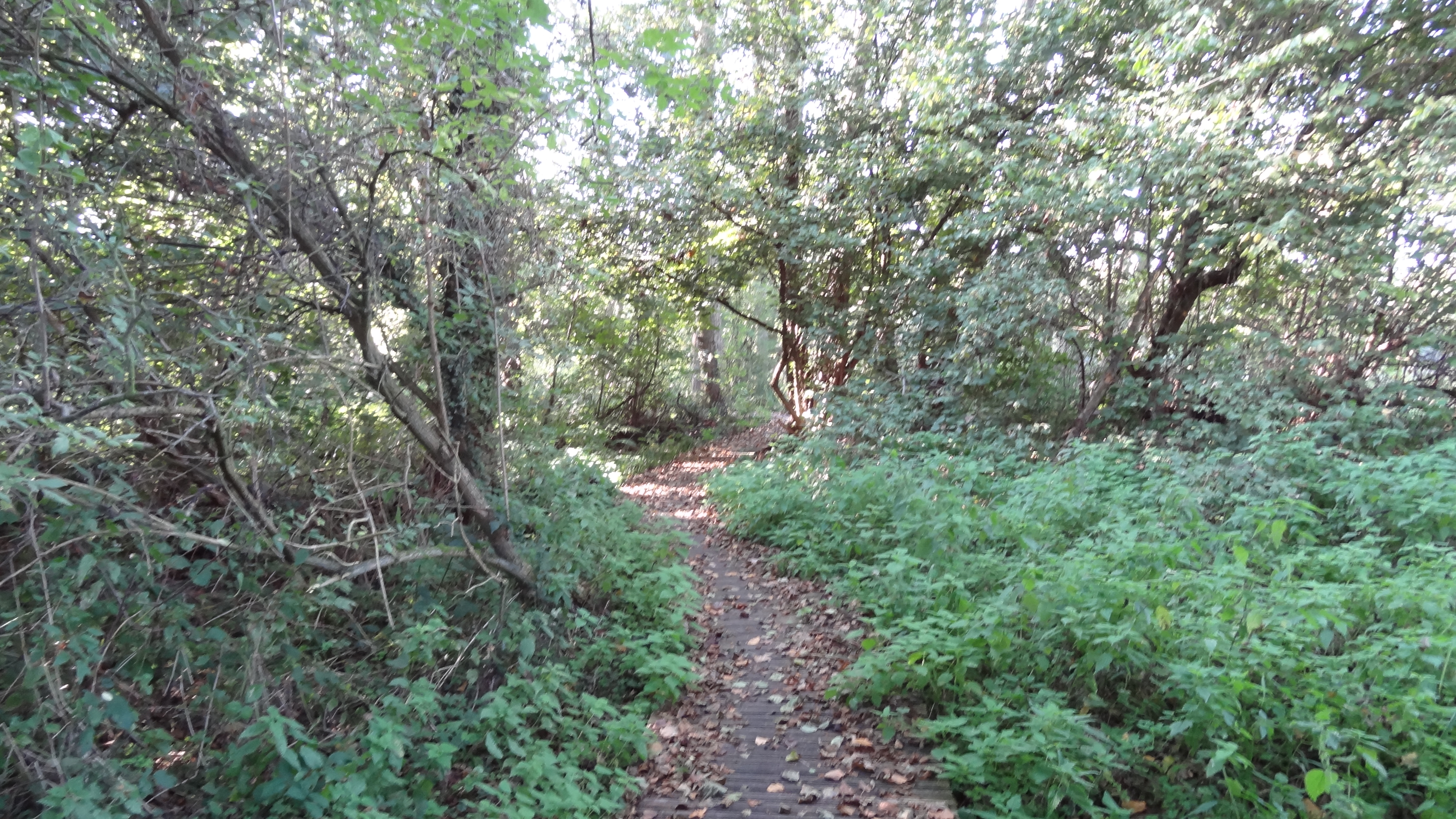
- Location of Denham Lock Wood.
- Area of search: Greater London
- Grid reference: TQ055863
- Interest: Biological
- Area: 6.3 hectares (16 acres)
- Notification date: 1986
- Location map: Magic Map

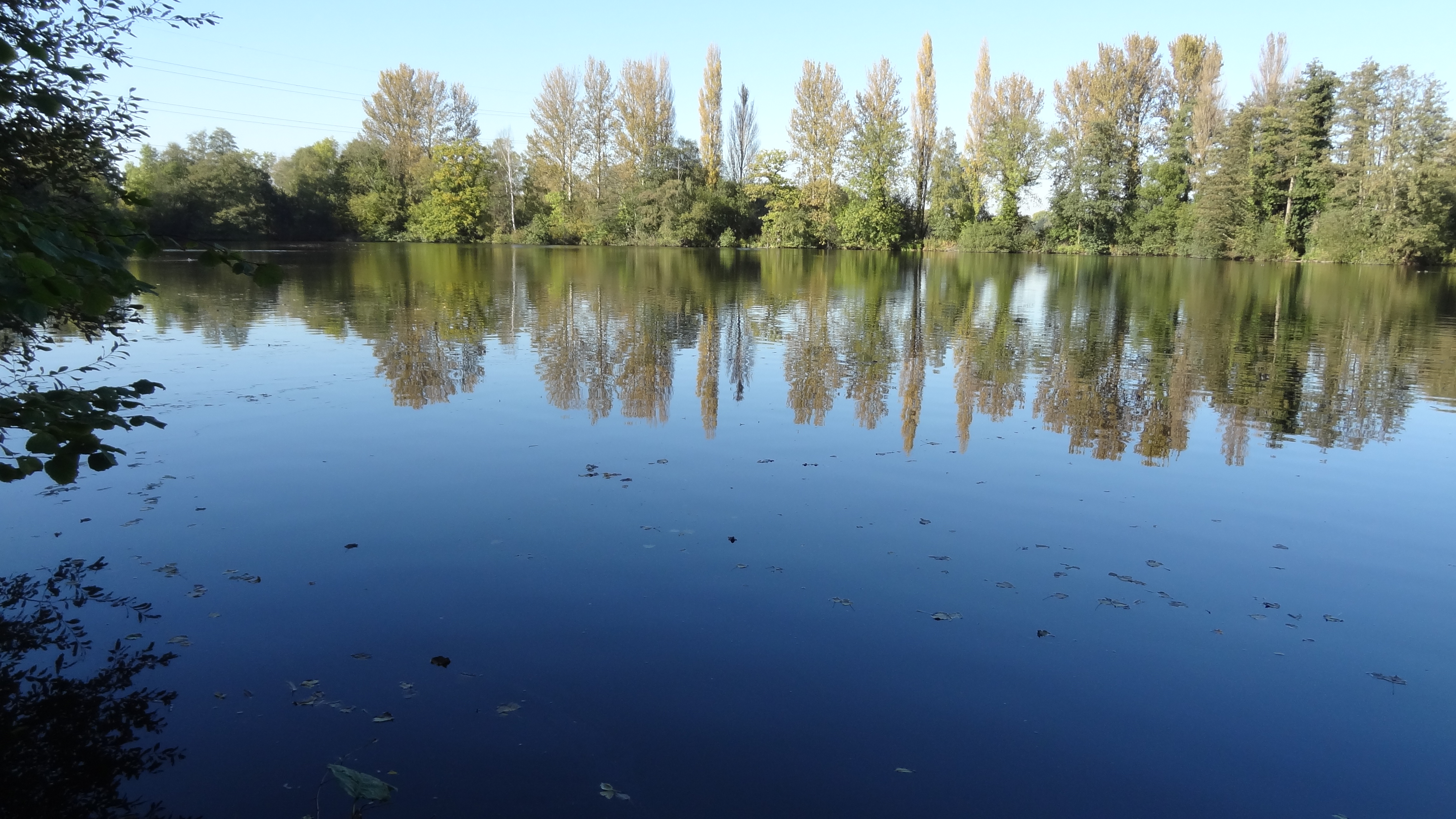
Carp Lake from Denham Lock Wood

Denham Lock Wood is a 6.3-hectare (16-acre) biological Site of Special Scientific Interest (SSSI) next to the Grand Union Canal, and near Denham in the London Borough of Hillingdon. It was notified in 1986 and is managed by the London Wildlife Trust on behalf of Hillingdon Council. It lies within the Colne Valley Regional Park.

== Description ==
It is a wet woodland and fen site which is skirted by the Frays River. The main trees are alder and crack willow in the wetter areas, and elsewhere oak and ash with a shrub layer of hazel. In winter wildfowl are visible and in spring many flower species. Invertebrates include red cardinal beetles, banded demoiselles and the rare and protected Desmoulin's whorl snail. The balsam carpet moth was added to the list of British species when it was found at the Wood in 1955, and it is only known at one other site in Britain.

== Accessibility ==
Access is by a footbridge across Frays River from Frays Farm Meadows, which is also an nature reserve managed by London Wildlife Trust, south of the Wood. Access to the Meadows is by a stile on the east side of the Grand Union Canal at Denham Lock.

== See also ==
- List of Sites of Special Scientific Interest in Greater London
