= Henry Aaron Hill =

American chemist

- Born: May 30, 1915; St. Joseph, Missouri
- Died: March 17, 1979 (aged 63); Haverhill, Massachusetts
- Education: Johnson C. Smith University; Massachusetts Institute of Technology
- Known for: president of the American Chemical Society
- Spouse: Adelaide M. Cromwell (m. 1943, divorced)
- Scientific career
- Fields: fluorocarbon and polymerization chemistry; fabric flammability and fireproofing.
- Workplaces: Riverside Research Laboratory (founder, 1961); National Polychemicals Inc. (co-founder, 1952); Dewey & Almy Chemical Co. Office of Scientific Research and Development
- Thesis: Test of the Van't Hoff's Principle of Optical Superposition

Henry Aaron Hill (May 30, 1915 – 1979) was an American chemist who became the first African American president of the American Chemical Society (ACS). As a scientist, he specialized in the chemistry of fluorocarbons.

== Education and career ==
Henry Hill was born on May 30, 1915, in St. Joseph, Missouri. He graduated from Johnson C. Smith University in Charlotte, North Carolina, with a Bachelor of Science degree in chemistry in 1936, before completing a Ph.D. in organic chemistry from Massachusetts Institute of Technology in Cambridge, Massachusetts, 1942. The title of his dissertation is "Test of Van't Hoff's Principle of Optical Superposition."

After receiving his Ph.D., Hill joined Atlantic Research Associates in Newtonville, Massachusetts, as a research chemist. He became research director there and became vice president in 1944. Hill was a civilian employee of the Office of Scientific Research and Development in 1944. In 1946, Hill moved to Dewey & Almy Chemical Co. in Cambridge, Massachusetts, as a research group leader. In 1952, he became assistant manager and co-founder of National Polychemicals, Inc., of Wilmington, Massachusetts. Hill founded Riverside Laboratory in 1961 for research, development, and consulting.

Hill's research focused on chemical intermediates for the production of polymer products.

== Discoveries and contributions ==
Hill's doctoral chemistry research began at Massachusetts Institute of Technology (MIT), where his thesis dissertation was titled "Test of Van't Hoff's Principle of Optical Superposition." His thesis states that the specific rotation of an optically active substance is the algebraic sum of certain constants corresponding to the active atoms present. Due to his fascination with organic chemistry, Hill became close with the current ACS president at the time, James Flack Norris, who helped Hill find a passion in polymerization chemistry.

Hill spent the bulk of his career focusing on polymer chemistry and fabric flammability through research on fluorocarbons in the Riverside Research Laboratory and the North Atlantic Research Cooperation in Massachusetts. Much of this research here was aimed at improving firefighter foam, used in fire extinguishers, and synthetic rubber manufacturing, which was a large-scale industry at the time. However, Hill grew interested in the business aspect of his products, and started his own company in 1962 called National Polychemicals Inc. This firm offered not only opportunities for further research and manufacturing, but also consulting services to a variety of clients in the synthetic polymer industry: hoping to improve the efficacy of rubber products and reduce the harmful effects of manufacturing and workplace fires.

Fluorocarbons are molecules that consist of carbons bounded to fluorine atoms that form extremely stable compounds due to the nature of the carbon – fluorine bond. Organofluorine chemistry is applicable to water resistance, reduced flammability, and also has some pharmaceutical applications. Hill's contributions to this field of science were significant and allowed for the use of fluorocarbons in the manufacturing of rubber polymers and fabrics in industry, due to the strength of their chemical nature. Much of the work that was done by Hill was used to ensure safety precautions for rubber and fluorocarbon products in manufacturing, as previous manufacturing plants would have frequent fires and safety hazards that came with the making of their products.

One of the most significant contributions that Hill made in his career was when he was president of the American Chemical Society ACS in 1977. Due to the severe amount of racial prejudice at the time, it was difficult for Hill to get a job. When he finally became president of the ACS, he mandated employee equality standards in the workplace, which prevented racial discrimination and prejudice, especially seen in chemical manufacturing and research labs. His contributions and discoveries to the field of chemistry live on, as nuanced approaches to manufacturing and policies denouncing racial prejudice in the chemistry field are still active today.

== Legacy ==
Hill served on the boards of the American Chemical Society (1971–1978) and Rohm & Haas, and he was a trustee of Johnson C. Smith University. Hill also worked in the area of consumer safety, serving as chairman of the Compliance Committee of the National Motor Vehicle Safety Advisory Council and was a member of the Information Council on Fabric Flammability. In 1968, Hill was appointed by President Lyndon B. Johnson to the National Commission on Product Safety (a predecessor to the Consumer Product Safety Commission).

The Northeastern Section of ACS awards the Henry A. Hill Award for Outstanding Service. Henry Hill was awarded (posthumously) the first Northeastern Henry Hill Award in 1980.
