= Adelaide M. Cromwell =

American historian (1919–2019)

- Adelaide Gulliver, from a 1978 publication
- Born: November 27, 1919; Washington, D.C.
- Died: June 8, 2019 (aged 99)
- Other names: Adelaide Cromwell Hill; Adelaide Cromwell Gulliver
- Education: Smith College; University of Pennsylvania; Radcliffe College
- Occupations: Sociologist, Educator
- Spouses: Henry A. Hill; Philip H. Gulliver
- Children: Anthony Cromwell Hill
- Parents: John Wesley Cromwell Jr. (father); Yetta Mavritte (mother)

Adelaide McGuinn Cromwell (November 27, 1919 – June 8, 2019) was an American sociologist and professor emeritus at Boston University, where she co-founded the African Studies Center in 1959, and directed the graduate program in Afro-American studies from 1969 to 1985. She was the first African-American instructor at Hunter College and at Smith College. In 1974 she was appointed as the first African-American Library Commissioner for the Commonwealth of Massachusetts. She wrote several books on black history, including a groundbreaking study of Boston's black upper class and a biography of Adelaide Casely-Hayford. She died in June 2019 at the age of 99.

== Early life and education ==
Adelaide Cromwell was born into a prominent Washington, D.C. family on November 27, 1919. Her grandfather, John Wesley Cromwell, was a well-known civil rights activist and educator, and her father, John Wesley Cromwell Jr., was the first black certified public accountant in the United States. Her aunt, Otelia Cromwell, was the first black graduate of Smith College, and her cousin, Edward Brooke, was a Senator of Massachusetts and the first popularly elected Black State Attorney General.

Cromwell graduated from Dunbar High School in 1936. She received an A.B. degree in sociology from Smith College in 1940 and an M.A. degree in sociology from the University of Pennsylvania in 1941. She earned a certificate in social casework from Bryn Mawr College in 1944, and a Ph.D. in sociology from Radcliffe College in 1952.

== Career ==
After graduating from Radcliffe, Cromwell taught sociology at Hunter College, where she was the first African-American instructor. She again broke the color line when she taught at Smith College in the late 1940s. In 1951, she joined the faculty at Boston University, where she taught sociology until 1985. In 1959, Cromwell co-founded the university's African Studies Center. From 1969 to 1985, she directed the African-American Studies program.

In 1960, Cromwell traveled to Ghana to convene the first conference of West African social workers. She also served on a committee commissioned by the American Methodist Church to evaluate the state of higher education in the Belgian Congo (now the Democratic Republic of the Congo). She was appointed in 1974 as Library Commissioner for the Commonwealth of Massachusetts, the first African American in this position. In 1983, she convened a conference of policymakers and scholars at the University of Liberia.

Cromwell served on the executive council of the American Society of African Culture, the now-defunct American Negro Leadership Conference in Africa, and the United States Agency for International Development's Advisory Committee on Voluntary Foreign Aid (ACVFA). She was a member of the Council on Foreign Relations, the African Studies Association, the Association for the Study of African American Life and History (ASALH), and the American Sociological Association.

She was president of the Heritage Guild, which she co-founded in 1975 to document, preserve, and raise awareness of Boston's black history. At that time, few Bostonians realized the historical significance of sites such as the African Meeting House on Beacon Hill, or knew that Boston's West End had once been a major center of the abolitionist movement. The Heritage Guild has called the public's attention to historical sites and the achievements of people such as Butler R. Wilson, founder of the Boston NAACP. Cromwell wrote several books on black history, including a study of Boston's black upper class, The Other Brahmins. She was honored by the Massachusetts Historical Commission in 2015 for her contributions.

== Selected writings ==
=== Books ===
- Apropos of Africa: Sentiments of Negro American Leaders on Africa from the 1800s to the 1950s. Psychology Press. 1969.
- Developing a Black Meritocracy: A History of Black Graduates of the Boston Latin School. Boston University Press. 1985.
- An African Victorian Feminist; the Life and Times of Adelaide Smith Casely Hayford, 1868–1960. Howard University Press. 1992. Routledge, 2014, ISBN 9781317792116
- The Other Brahmins: Boston's Black Upper Class, 1750–1950. University of Arkansas Press. 1994.
- Unveiled Voices, Unvarnished Memories: The Cromwell Family in Slavery and Segregation, 1692–1972. University of Missouri Press. 1996.

=== Articles ===
- "Social Workers and Their Training in Ghana". West African Journal of Education. V (1): 24–32. February 1961.
- "Desegregation in Education and the American Negro". West African Journal of Education. VI (2): 85–90. 1962.
- Frazier, E. Franklin, ed. (1963). "The Impact of Africa Upon the American Negro". The Negro and Social Research: Papers contributed to the 26th Annual Spring Conference of the Division of the Social Sciences, April 22-25, 1963. The Howard University Press. pp. 75–102.
- Barbour, Floyd B., ed. (1970). "Black Education in the Seventies: A Lesson From the Past". The Black Seventies. Porter Sargent Publishers. pp. 51–67.
- "The History of Oak Bluffs as a Popular Resort for Blacks". The Dukes County Intelligencer. 26 (1): 2–35. August 1984.
- Jacobs, Donald, ed. (1993). "The Black Presence in the West End of Boston, 1800-1864: A Demographic Map". Courage and Conscience: Black and White Abolitionists in Boston. Indiana University Press.
- West, Dorothy (1996). "Afterword". The Living Is Easy. The Feminist Press at CUNY. ISBN 9781558611474.

== Honors and awards ==
- Citation from the National Order of Côte d'Ivoire
- Smith College Medal
- Carter G. Woodson Medal from the Association for the Study of African American Life and History
- Honorary degrees from Southeastern Massachusetts University, George Washington University, Boston University, and Smith College
- Historic Preservation Award from the Massachusetts Historical Commission, 2015
