= John Wesley Cromwell =

American lawyer

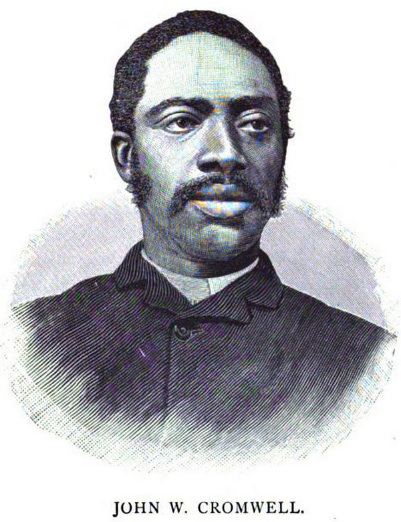
- John Wesley Cromwell from 1887 publication
- Born: September 5, 1846; Portsmouth, Virginia, U.S.
- Died: April 14, 1927 (aged 80); Washington, D.C., U.S.
- Occupations: teacher, lawyer, civil servant, journalist, historian, civil rights activist
- Spouse(s): Lucy A. McGuinn, Annie E. Conn
- Children: 7 (including John Wesley Cromwell Jr. and Otelia Cromwell)

John Wesley Cromwell (September 5, 1846 – April 14, 1927) was a lawyer, teacher, civil servant, journalist, historian, and civil rights activist in Washington, D.C. He was among the founders of the Bethel Literary and Historical Society and the American Negro Academy, both based in the capital. He worked for decades in administration of the US Post Office.

He also was a founder, editor, or contributor to a number of newspapers and journals, including most prominently The People's Advocate. In the latter half of his career, he wrote articles and manuscripts and gave speeches, establishing himself as a leading scholar of African-American history. In 1887, he was described as the "best English scholar in the United States." Cromwell was also successful as a lawyer late in life and was the first black lawyer to appear before the Interstate Commerce Commission.

== Early life ==
John Wesley Cromwell was born into slavery on September 5, 1846, in Portsmouth, Virginia. He was the youngest of twelve children. His parents were Willis H. and Elizabeth (Carney) Cromwell. Cromwell's father worked as a ferryman on the Elizabeth River and was allowed to keep some of his wages. One brother, Levi, later became well known as a caterer in Washington, DC.

In 1851, their father purchased freedom for his family, and they moved to Philadelphia in the free state of Pennsylvania. John attended school there from 1851 to 1856. He moved to a teaching school, the Preparatory Department of the Institute for Colored Youth, where Ebenezer Bassett was the principal. Cromwell graduated in the summer of 1864.

He moved to Columbia, Pennsylvania, that fall in October 1864 to begin his career as a teacher. When the school in Columbia closed, Cromwell returned to Portsmouth, Virginia, in April 1865 in the closing days of the American Civil War, starting a private school where he worked until the fall.

By the end of 1865 Cromwell returned to Philadelphia; he taught at the Baltimore Association for the Moral and Intellectual Improvement of the Colored People. In March 1866, the school was attacked and burned to the ground and Cromwell was shot at. He continued to work for the organization until May. That month he returned to Virginia, working for the American Missionary Association at Providence Church in Norfolk County, Virginia. It was establishing schools across the South. At this time, he became more active in politics. He also briefly worked in the grocery business.

== Public career ==
In Virginia, Cromwell became involved in public affairs. In 1867, Cromwell was in the US District Court Jury Pool and served in the jury on a number of cases of government officials. On April 17, 1867, he was a delegate to the Republican convention in Richmond, Virginia and again to the Republican State convention in Richmond, Virginia, in August. Later that year, he attended the Virginia Constitutional Convention, where he was elected clerk.

In 1869, Cromwell returned to teaching, working with the Quaker group, the Philadelphia Friends. That year, Cromwell was an eyewitness to the assassination of Joseph R. Holmes, a fellow member of the Constitutional Convention and a candidate for the Virginia House of Delegates. In 1869 and 1870, he taught at a grade school in Withersville, Virginia. In 1870 he returned to the capital Richmond, where he was principal of a black school held in Dill's Bakery. In the summer of 1871, he taught a term in Southampton County. This experience influenced his later writings on Nat Turner's slave rebellion of 1831, which had occurred nearby.

In the fall of 1871, Cromwell moved to Washington, D.C., and enrolled in the Howard University Law Department. He graduated in March 1874 and was admitted to the bar before the Supreme Court of the District of Columbia. In the meantime, in 1872, Cromwell passed the civil service exam to qualify for an appointment in the federal government. He took a position as a government clerk. In this exam, he had the highest score of his cohort. He also took a merit exam to qualify for teaching, and scored at the top. He accepted a teaching appointment for a time in Washington County, Virginia.

In 1873 and 1874, Cromwell was twice promoted in his clerkship and, along with Robert William Waring, was one of the first two black clerks to receive such an office. He was promoted to chief examiner of the division of the money order department, and was register of money order accounts until his retirement from the civil service in 1885. In April 1875, federal clerks took part in two spelling bees, which were covered by newspapers across the country. Cromwell was a finalist in both. He was successful as a lawyer and was the first black lawyer to appear before the Interstate Commerce Commission.

In 1875, Cromwell was a part of organizing the Virginia Educational and Historical Association; he served as its president until 1883, when it closed. Cromwell was also active as a journalist. In 1876, he organized a journal, the ''People's Advocate'' in Alexandria, Virginia, which moved to Washington, D.C., the next year. He ran it until 1884. In 1883, he was president of the Bethel Literary society. He was a member of the Odd Fellows and of the Metropolitan AME Church. He represented the District in the 1884 World's Fair, also known as the Cotton Centennial Exhibition, at New Orleans.

In 1881 Cromwell and Daniel Alexander Payne founded the Bethel Literary and Historical Association, and he served as president of that lyceum in 1883. In 1897, Cromwell was a part of the formation of the American Negro Academy founded by Alexander Crummell. He served as the organization's corresponding secretary until 1919. In 1919, he served as the fourth president for a short period. From 1901 to 1909 he was editor of the Washington weekly, the Washington Record. In 1910, he and James Robert Lincoln Diggs established the American Negro Monograph Company, a publishing company which lasted for eleven months.

From 1901 to 1909 he taught and served as principals of several District schools, including Briggs, Garnet, Banneker, and Crummell schools.

== Thought and legacy ==
Beyond his work as an educator, Cromwell played a significant role in the direction of black American thought. The Bethel Literary Organization, which he helped create and direct, and his speeches at other lyceums in the capital were highly influential. In 1900, Cromwell made a substantial donation of materials to the Howard University Library now called the Cromwell Collection.

Cromwell was a strong advocate of black-owned businesses and encouraged black economic success. He believed black people should try to frequent black-owned businesses. Cromwell was considered an important statistician and historian in the later part of his life. He had great contempt for efforts to minimize the cost of slavery to blacks in America and focused significant attention on slave insurrections. Cromwell wrote that Nat Turner's revolt was an example of black people working to "help himself rather than depend on the other human agencies for the protection which could come through his own strong arm."

Cromwell wrote many papers and a number of book-length pieces. Cromwell's 1914 book, The Negro in American History: Men and Women Eminent in the Evolution of the American of African Descent, influenced Carter G. Woodson to create the Association for the Study of Negro Life and History in 1915. Cromwell later published articles in the Journal of Negro History.

== Family ==
In 1873 Cromwell married Lucy A. McGuinn of Richmond and had seven children with her. The couple stressed the importance of education for all their children, who included Otelia, Mary E., Martha, Lucy, John Wesley Jr., and Brent.

Otelia Cromwell, born in 1874, became the first black graduate of Smith College. She was a teacher and professor at Miner Teacher College, and received a PhD from Yale in 1926. Mary E. Cromwell was born in 1876 and taught mathematics. John Wesley Cromwell Jr. was born in 1883 and taught mathematics, German, and bookkeeping; he became the first black certified public accountant.

After Lucy's death, in 1892 Cromwell married Annie E. Conn of Mechanicsburg, Pennsylvania.

Cromwell died April 14, 1927. His granddaughter Adelaide M. Cromwell, child of John Wesley Jr., is a noted sociologist and historian.

== See also ==
- African American officeholders from the end of the Civil War until before 1900
