= Otelia Cromwell =

American scholar and professor (1874–1972)

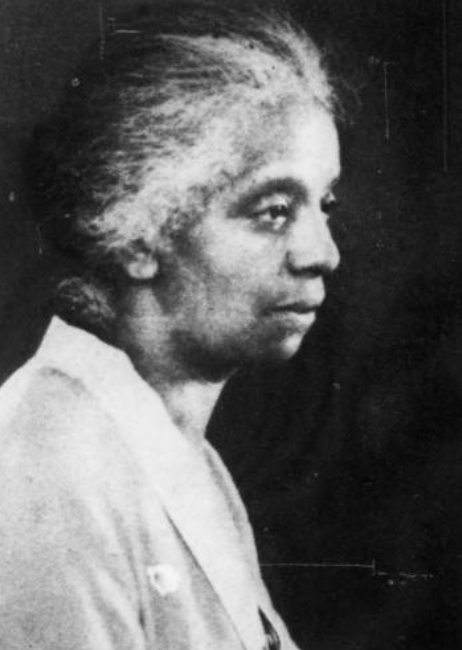
- Cromwell, from a 1926 publication
- Born: April 8, 1874; Washington, D.C.
- Died: April 25, 1972 (aged 98)
- Education: Miner Normal School; Howard University; Smith College (B.A.); Columbia University (M.A.); Yale University (Ph.D.)
- Occupation: Professor
- Parent(s): Lucy McGuinn and John Wesley Cromwell
- Relatives: John Wesley Cromwell Jr. (brother); Adelaide M. Cromwell (niece)

Otelia Cromwell (April 8, 1874 – April 25, 1972) was a distinguished scholar and Professor of English Language and Literature at Miner Teachers College now known as University of the District of Columbia. She was the first African American to graduate from Smith College, receiving a B.A. in Classics in 1900. She later earned her M.A. at Columbia University in 1910 and a Ph.D. in English at Yale University in 1926, becoming the first African-American woman to earn a doctorate degree there.

== Early life, education and early career ==
Born on April 8, 1874, in Washington, D.C., Otelia Cromwell was the daughter of Lucy McGuinn and John Wesley Cromwell, and the eldest of six children. She was 12 when her mother died, leaving Otelia responsible for her five younger siblings. After graduating from the Miner Normal School (now known as the University of the District of Columbia), she taught in Washington, D.C. schools for several years, before attending Howard University. In 1898, she transferred to Smith College, and graduated in 1900. At that time, there were only two other black students at Smith College — Helen Maria Chesnutt and her sister Ethel — who both graduated a year later.

== Career ==
Cromwell continued teaching D.C.'s segregated public schools for a few years before resuming her education. She taught English, German, and Latin at the M Street High School and the Armstrong Manual Training School. She earned a master's degree from Columbia University in New York City after attending summer sessions. She was awarded an academic scholarship and received her Ph.D. in English from Yale University in 1926. Her dissertation, Thomas Heywood, Dramatist: A Study in Elizabethan Drama of Everyday Life, was published by Yale University Press in 1928.

Directly following her time at Yale, Cromwell became a professor of English language and literature at University of the District of Columbia, later becoming head of the literature department. She taught there until her retirement in 1944. Throughout her academic career, Cromwell worked to advance the cause of civil rights and racial and gender equality. Upon her retirement, Cromwell began what was to be her major scholarly work, The Life of Lucretia Mott (Harvard University Press, 1958). Cromwell edited Readings from Negro Authors, an early anthology of African-American literary contributions.

Cromwell had a brother, John Wesley Cromwell Jr. She was the aunt of Adelaide M. Cromwell, a sociologist and historian who was the first African-American instructor at Smith College.

Otelia Cromwell died at her family home in 1972 at the age of 98.

== Honors ==
- In 1950, Smith College awarded Cromwell an honorary doctorate.
- Cromwell Academy, a private high school in Washington, D.C., was named in honor of Otelia and her brother John by its founder, Ruby Woodson, in 1972. It was established to provide college preparatory education to high potential students of all social and economic backgrounds. The academy opened its doors in the educational annex of Peoples Congregational Church. The school closed its doors in 1985.
- In 1989, Smith College began the tradition of celebrating Otelia Cromwell Day each November. Classes would be cancelled in order to discuss race and diversity.

== See also ==
- List of African-American firsts
