= Denham Country Park =

Park in Buckinghamshire and Greater London, England

Coordinates: 51.566°N 0.4836°W

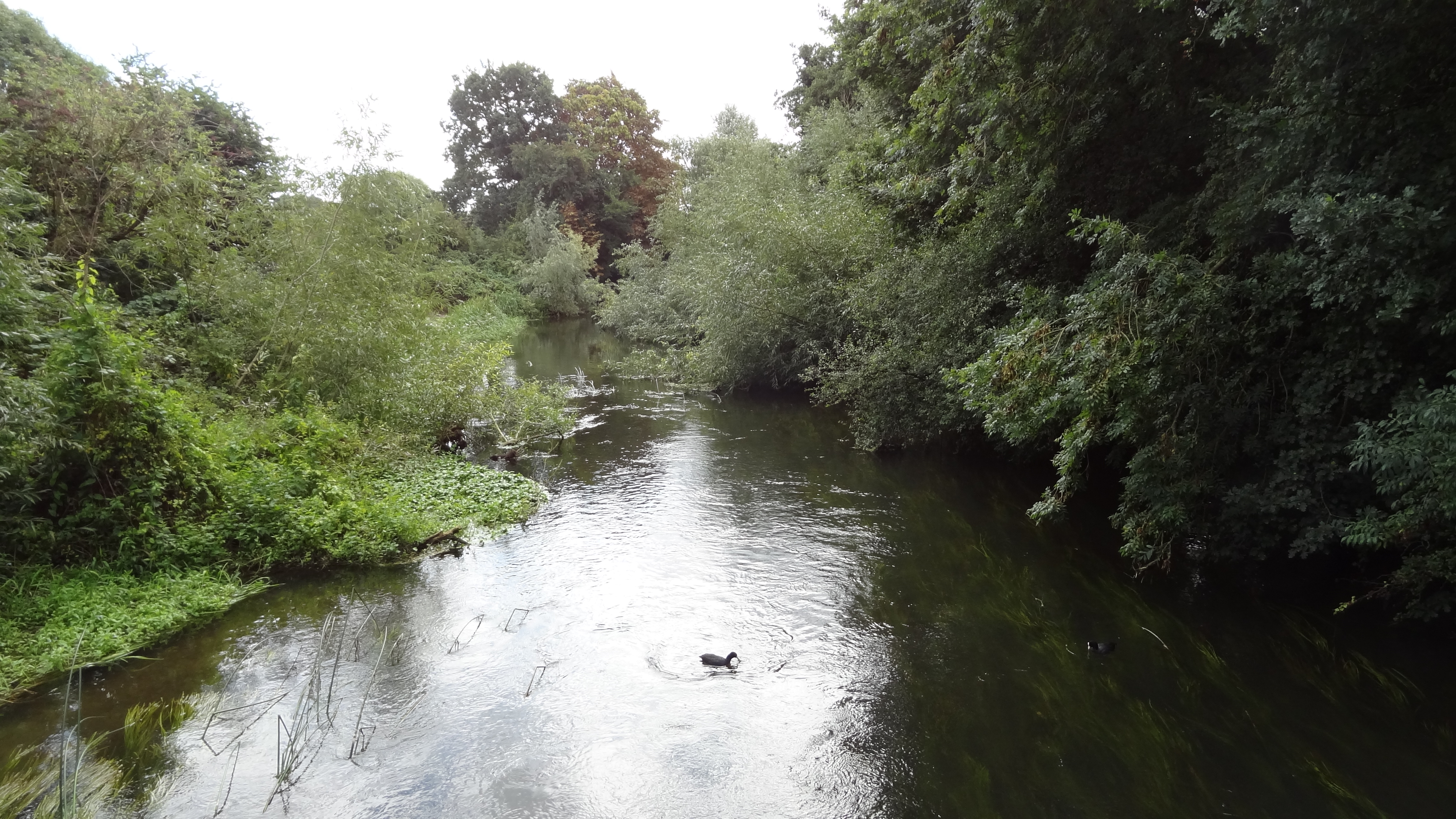
The River Colne in Denham Country Park is the boundary between London and Buckinghamshire

Denham Country Park is a 69-acre public park and Local Nature Reserve in Buckinghamshire and the London Borough of Hillingdon. It is part of the 42 square mile Colne Valley Regional Park, and the Colne Valley Park Visitor Centre and cafe are located in Denham Country Park.

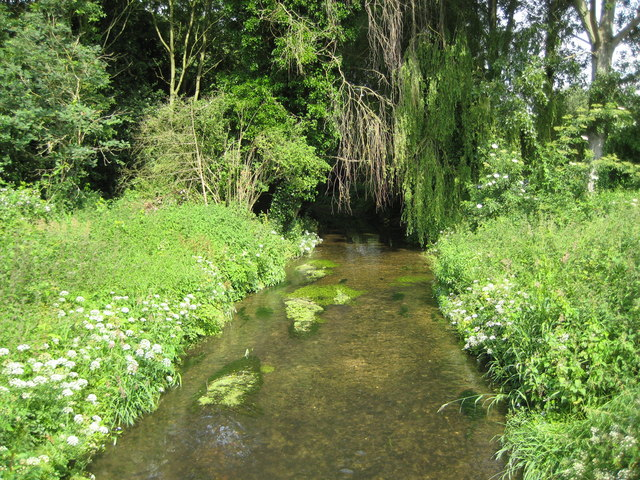
The River Misbourne

The Colne and Misbourne rivers pass through the park and the Grand Union Canal forms its eastern boundary. It has a variety of wildlife, including herons, kingfishers, damselflies and dragonflies.

There is access from Denham Court Drive and the canal towpath.

== Denham Quarry Park ==
Natural England lists Denham Quarry Park as a separate Local Nature Reserve in Buckinghamshire. However, this appears to be an error as the boundaries are shown as almost the same as Denham Country Park, and Denham Quarry is on the other side of the Grand Union Canal in Hillingdon.
