= Ruby G. Woodson =

American educator (1931–2008)

Ruby Garrard Woodson
- Ruby G. Woodson, founder of Cromwell Academy and of Florida Academy of African American Culture, c. 1975
- Born: June 22, 1931; Houston County, Alabama
- Died: February 8, 2008 (aged 76)
- Education: Florida A & M University, BS; American University, MA
- Occupation(s): Educator, chemistry teacher
- Children: William G. Woodson

Ruby Garrard Woodson (June 22, 1931 – February 8, 2008) was an educator and chemistry teacher who founded Cromwell Academy in Washington, D. C. and Florida Academy of African American Culture in Sarasota, Florida.

She was born in Houston County, Alabama, but raised in Sarasota. Her mother, Ella Mae Garrard (later, Singleton) worked as a maid and later owned a small country store. Her father, David Garrard, was a farmer, and later a circus roustabout. She had one child, William G. Woodson.

At the age of fifteen, she was the valedictorian of her class of 1947 when she graduated from Booker High School in Sarasota.

At the age of nineteen, in June 1951 Woodson was awarded her Bachelor of Science degree in chemistry from Florida A & M University in Tallahassee, Florida. She received her Master of Arts degree in education from American University in Washington, D.C., in 1960. Her masters thesis was entitled, Some Effects of the Atomic Era on the Teaching of High School Chemistry in the United States.

== Breaking racial barrier at Sarasota library ==
In 1957, while she was on a vacation in her hometown of Sarasota and researching materials for completion of her master's degree, Ruby Woodson was refused entry to the public library in Sarasota. She made a formal objection to her treatment that she took to city and county government officials. Her efforts led to the elimination of racial barriers to community services paid for by the taxation of all residents. Soon the vestiges of segregation began to fall in Sarasota and all residents were granted access to the library.

== Cromwell Academy founded ==
Memorial resolution honoring the contributions and achievements of Ruby Garrard Woodson

She spent thirteen years teaching chemistry and physics in the Washington, D.C. public school system before founding Cromwell Academy, a private secondary school to serve gifted minority students in the district. The academy was founded in 1973 in a church annex and soon was sending many of its students to classes at Georgetown University and Howard University for credits toward their secondary diplomas. The inspiration for the name of the academy was Otelia Cromwell, an educator who was the first black woman awarded a Ph.D. by Yale University. A reputation developed quickly by the academy for its academic achievements, attracting the enrollment of their children by prominent people as well as the gifted and aspiring members of disadvantaged groups whose teachers advised application to the academy. Bill Cosby sent his son, Ennis, and the president of Venezuela sent his daughter.

Woodson was a pivotal figure in the day-to-day administration of the academy and fulfilled many other roles such as college placement adviser, guidance counselor, as well as instructor. Initial difficulties encountered in operating expenses often were resolved by donations from Woodson's personal savings.

The student body of the academy was small and familial. Often, instruction in life skills also fell to Woodson, who helped the students with financing as well as handling personal issues and later, negotiating such things as the purchase of automobiles and houses. Donations were sought to develop a scholarship program to assist many of the students. Woodson had overcome dyslexia in her efforts to excel and was able to provide special insights to children coping with similar hurdles. She inspired the students with her own high standards of ethics and morality and helped them develop personal discipline and self-respect. She taught them how to make applications to colleges appropriate to their interests and abilities and to apply for scholarships.

The students from the academy gained entrance to the best academic institutions in the country and soon Woodson's students were awarded baccalaureate and advanced degrees form Columbia University, Mount Holyoke College, Smith College, Yale University, and Vassar College. The academy became recognized for academic excellence.

One 1979 graduate of the academy, Lisa S. Martin, later graduated from Yale University and Emory University and is a practicing psychologist in Maryland. She attests to the power Woodson had to inspire her students, making them feel able to meet any type of academic challenge and motivating them to win acceptance at the institutions of their choice, namely Ivy League, the big ten, or top southern colleges. Woodson's achievements were lauded in the Washington Post and by the United States Department of Education.

== Retirement to Sarasota ==
In 1989 Ruby Woodson retired to Sarasota, but immersed herself in the affairs of the community. She participated in many cultural and civic activities, from the Asolo Center for the Performing Arts and Habitat for Humanity to the United Way as well as in local and regional long-range planning charrettes. She ultimately was moved to found the Florida Academy for African-American Culture (FAAC), an institution dedicated to educational advancement and cultural preservation with a special emphasis on children from pre-school through high school.

She was appointed to the county library advisory board and was among those who brought a branch of the library to the Newtown neighborhood, the section of the city where she had been raised, so a library would be within walking distance for the children of that area. The United Way named Ruby Woodson among the twelve Women of Community Impact in Sarasota County.

== Florida Academy for African American Culture founded ==
After her return to Sarasota, Woodson founded another educational institution in that community, the Florida Academy for African American Culture.

The home of a prominent photographer, the Pearl and Grover Koons House, was purchased, listed on the National Register of Historic Places, and developed as a museum with a library, the African-American Culture Research Center and Library, to enhance the educational opportunities of the children of the community. It had classrooms for gifted pre-school and school-age students in an adjacent building.

The academy sponsored oratory and essay contests, awarding prizes to students participating in its Black History events. Its library donated books to local students, churches, and day-care centers. Every Saturday free books were given to interested children coming to the academy.

== Focus on reading to inspire children ==
An avid reader from her youth, Ruby Woodson emphasized the importance of developing reading skills in children and encouraging them to read about all things that interest them. She credited her father and Ethel Reid Hays, her first teacher, for encouraging her interest in reading.

I believe that learning to read at a young age and reading everything (as I did) makes all of the difference in the life of a child.

— Ruby G. Woodsen

The quote above is from a biography of Ruby Woodson assembled and kept on file by the Family Heritage House Museum in Manatee County, Florida; the museum is on the campus of the State College of Florida (formerly Manatee Community College). The file includes an undated article published by the United Way of Sarasota County entitled, Ruby Woodson, that contains this quote.
