= Frays River =

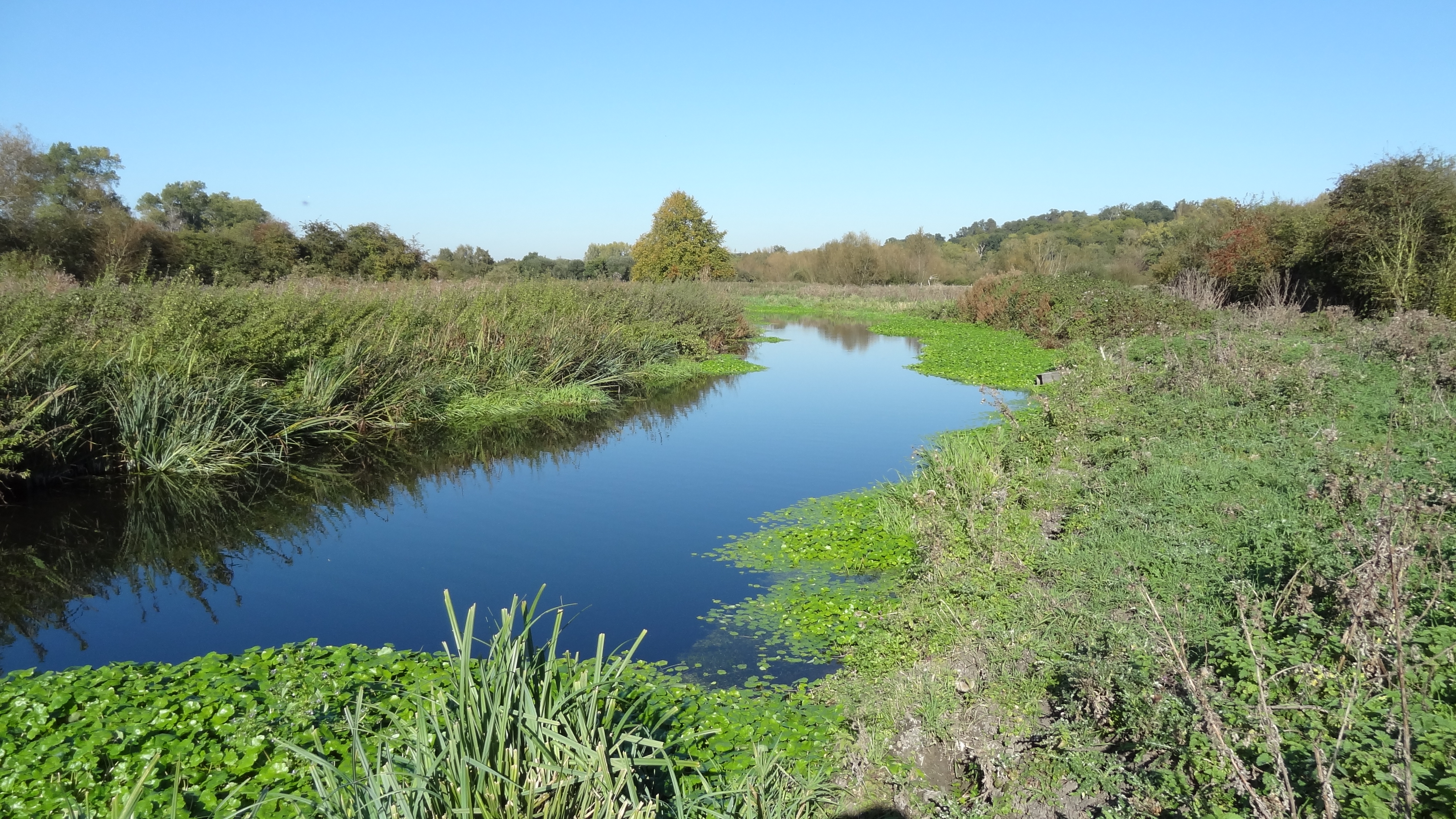
- Frays River in Frays Farm Meadows

Location
- Country: England
- County: Buckinghamshire, London Borough of Hillingdon

Physical characteristics
- Source
  - location: River Colne, Denham Weir, Buckinghamshire
  - coordinates: 51.5661°N 0.4832°W
  - elevation: 35 m (115 ft)
- Mouth
  - location: River Colne, West Drayton
  - coordinates: 51.4995°N 0.4848°W
  - elevation: 24 m (79 ft)
- Length: 5.5 mi (8.9 km)

Basin features
- Tributaries
  - left: River Pinn

Frays River is a semi-canalised short river in England that branches off the River Colne at Uxbridge Moor and rejoins it at West Drayton. It is believed to be a mainly man-made anabranch north of the confluence with the River Pinn to feed watermills in the Parish of Hillingdon. The river is believed to be named after John Fray who owned Cowley Hall in the fifteenth century. Other names for the river are the Uxbridge and Cowley Mill Stream, the Cowley Stream or the Colham Mill Stream. Two of the three mills in Hillingdon Parish recorded in the Domesday Book are believed to have been located on the southern section of the river.

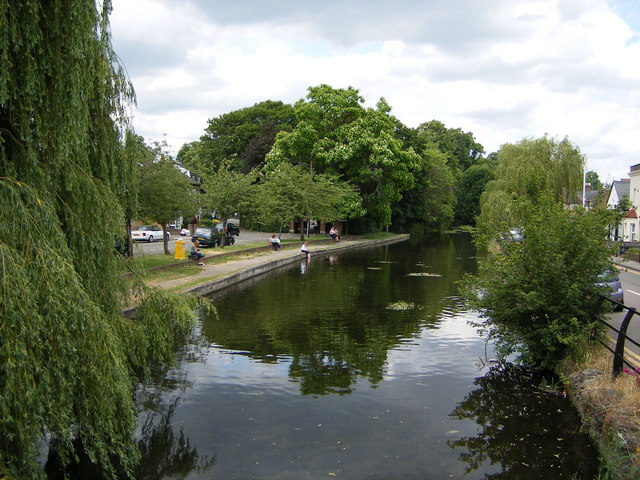
The river in Uxbridge

== Course ==
The Frays River leaves the River Colne east of Denham, Buckinghamshire at Denham Weir. It passes through Frays Farm Meadows, Uxbridge, Cowley, Yiewsley and West Drayton. At Cowley the Grand Union Canal mainline is carried over the river in an aqueduct at Cowley lock. The Frays continues south, flowing past Little Britain Lake on its western side before crossing under the Slough Arm of the Grand Union Canal which is also carried above it in an aqueduct. In Yiewsley it is joined on its east bank by the River Pinn. It then re-joins the River Colne at Drayton Point in West Drayton.

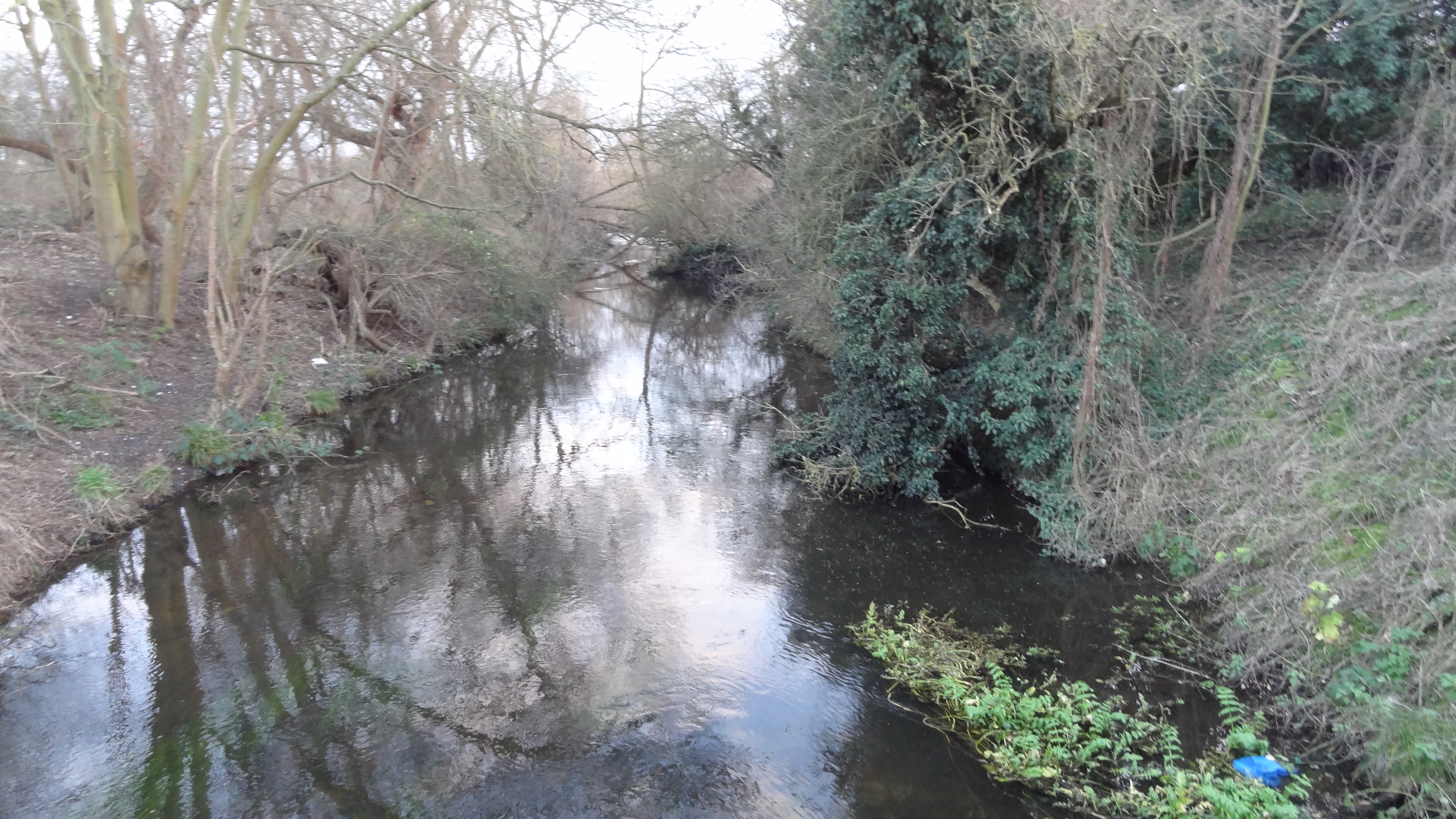
View of the river from the aqueduct on the Slough Arm of the Grand Union Canal in Yiewsley

== Ecology ==
The river flows through two Sites of Special Scientific Interest managed by the London Wildlife Trust: Frays Farm Meadows and Denham Lock Wood. Frays Island, at the confluence of the Fray and the River Colne in West Drayton, is a Site of Metropolitan Importance for Nature Conservation and is also managed by the trust.

== Literary connections ==
George Orwell once taught at Frays College, Uxbridge, which was on the banks of the river.

== See also ==
- List of rivers of England
