= PINN =

PINN may stand for:

- Proposed International nonproprietary name
- Physics-informed neural networks

== See also ==
- Pinn (surname)
