= Paddington Arm =

Canal in London

Coordinates: 51.4997°N 0.4067°W

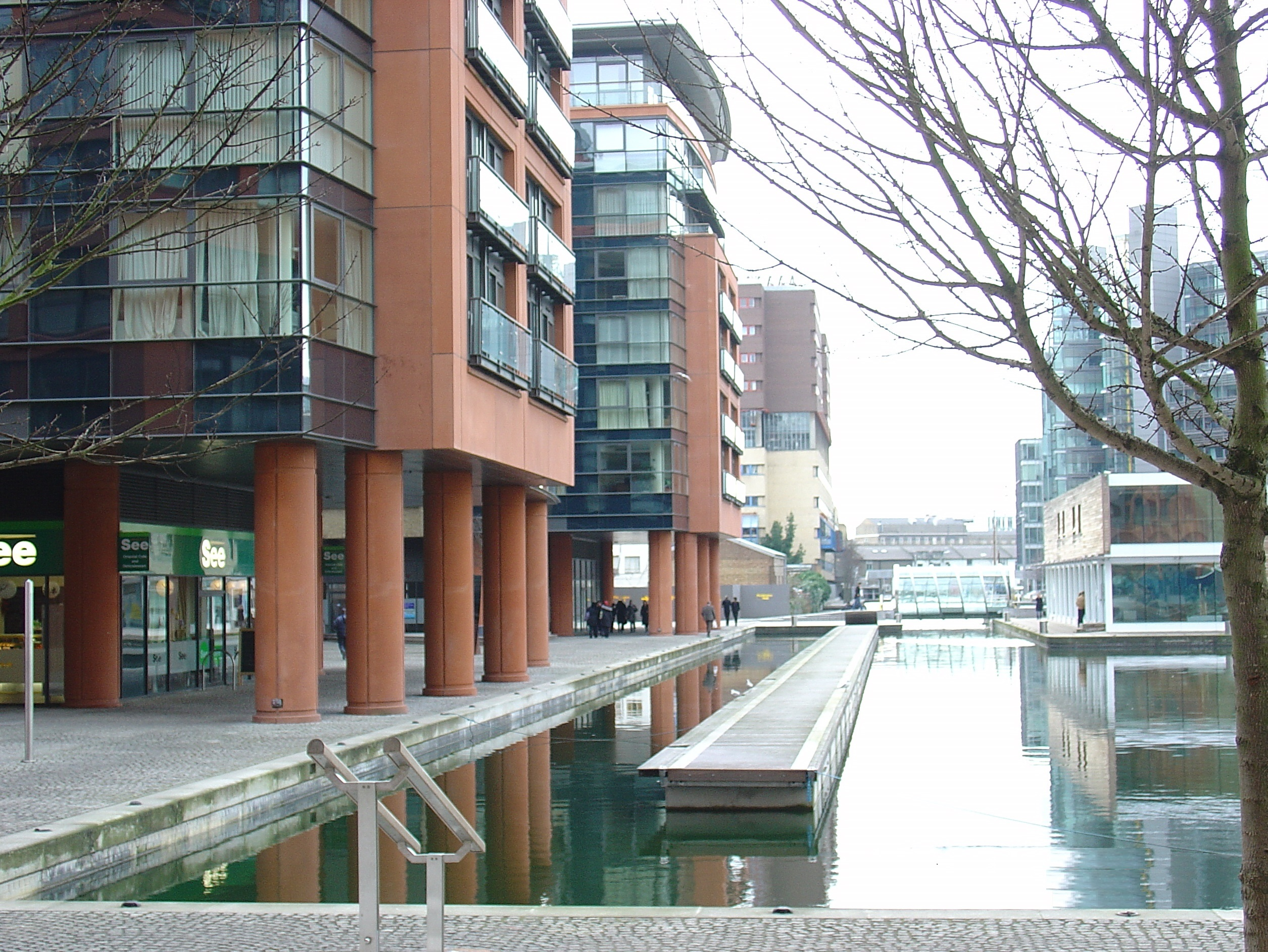
Paddington Basin

The Paddington Canal or Paddington Arm (also known as Paddington Branch) of the Grand Union Canal is a 13 1/2-mile (22 km) canal from Bull's Bridge in Hayes, west London, to Paddington in central London, England. Little Venice — its only junction — is with the Regent's Canal to the North, and Limehouse Basin to the east. The arm and the two canals it links are fed by water from the Brent Reservoir. The Paddington Arm is part of a long pound that stretches for nearly thirty miles.

== History ==
=== Transport and the economy ===
The canal was authorised by an act of Parliament of April 1795, later called the Grand Junction Canal (No. 2) Act 1795 (35 Geo. 3. c. 43). At the time the Industrial Revolution was advanced. Promoters saw a purpose in opening a water-transport route between two divergent economies. London had many niche industries and global imports added to which from the late 1830s was added almost direct access to the western rail terminus. The Midlands had mass-manufactured goods, raw and processed commodities such as coal, bricks, wood, steel and iron and remains the main destination from the western end of this canal. It was later extended towards the City of London by construction of the Regent's Canal which ran from a junction at Maida Vale to the River Thames at Limehouse, via the City Road Basin and five others.

=== The Paddington Basin and Little Venice, Maida Vale ===
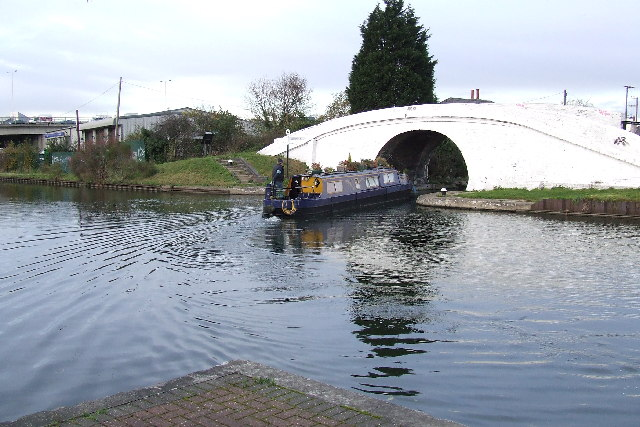
Bull's Bridge junction on the Grand Union Canal

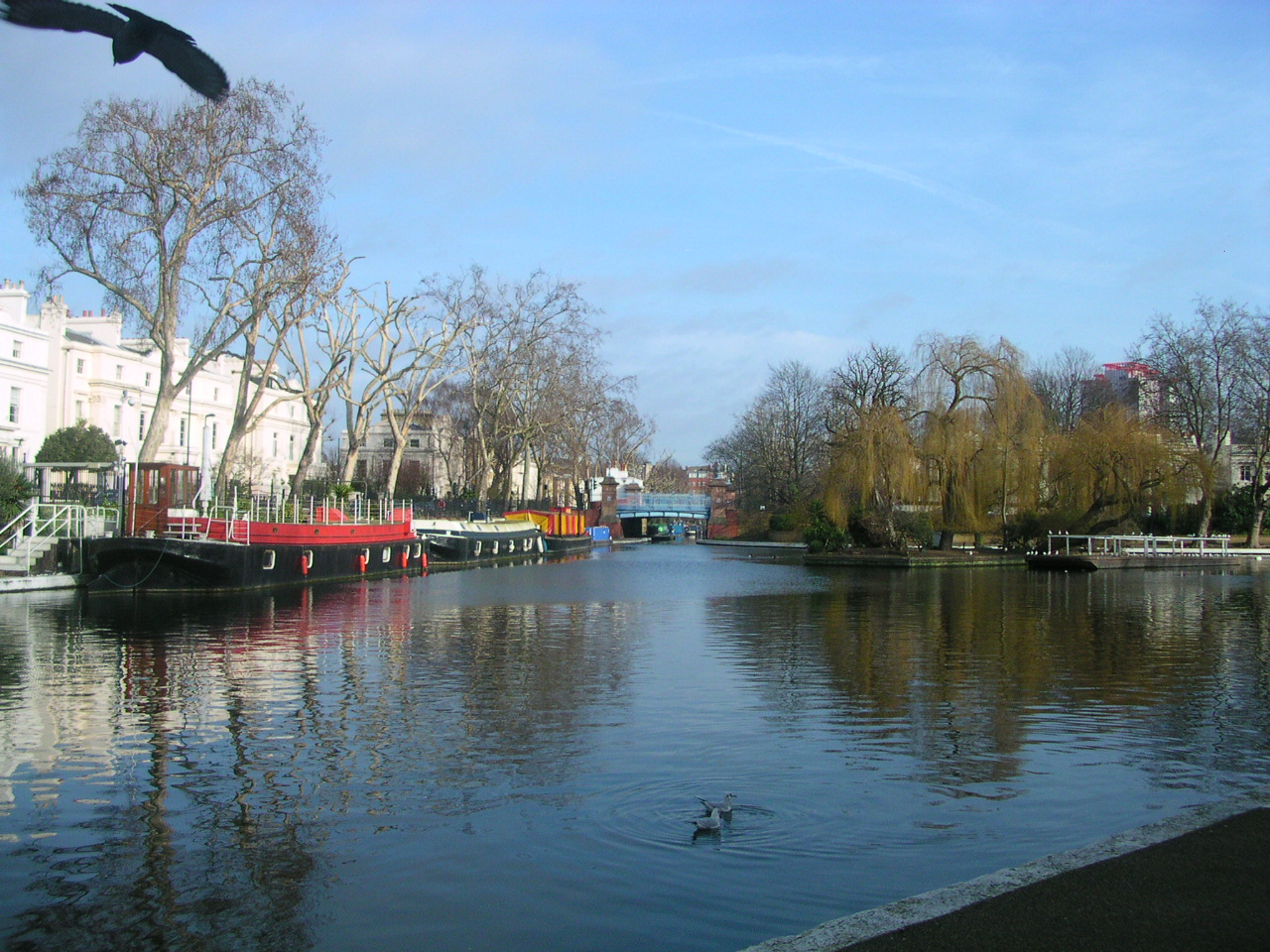
The canal junction at Little Venice

The Paddington canal was opened on 10 July 1801, when 20,000 people were reported to attend. Paddington was in 1801 a village buffered by a small line of fields from the closest parts of the rapidly expanding conurbation of London. It was said in 1853 that at the beginning of the 1700s "next to the beautiful fields and quiet village, the gallows and the gibbet were the principal attractions in Paddington" in Robins' Paddington Past and Present, written by a writer who lived in the area in the 1830s and 1840s. Robins records the banks near to Paddington for many early decades were refuse transfer yards, i.e. onward dumping grounds for London dustmen and to an extent night soilmen:

...Immense heaps of dust and ashes towered high above the house-tops; and these artificial mountains are said to have been worth £10,000 a piece ...

Not only the dust and ashes but the filth of half London were brought to "that stinking Paddington" (as it was now called) for convenience of removal.

By the mid-19th century, refuse stations were moved elsewhere and grand mansions were built alongside the closing mile of banks, including Beauchamp Lodge, the home of poet Robert Browning, 1862–1887. Bazalgette's Northern Outfall Sewer — specifically two of its five interceptor sewers — has taken the sewage of surrounding areas since their completion in the 1870s.

== Part of a large pound ==
The Paddington Arm is part of a large canal pound. The pound stretches from the Hampstead Road Lock in Camden (lock number 24 on the Regent's Canal) into Little Venice, along the full length of the Paddington Arm to the Main Grand Union Canal at Bulls Bridge. It continues about two miles south from there to the Norwood Top Lock (lock number 90 on the Grand Union) and north about five miles to Cowley Lock (number 89 on the Grand Union). About a mile south of Cowley Lock, at Peachy Junction, the Slough Arm branches off the Grand Union and heads west for five miles to terminate at Slough Basin. It too is part of the same pound.

The size of the pound means that a boat can travel from Slough Basin along the Slough Arm, south along the Grand Union to Bulls Bridge, along the Paddington Arm through Little Venice and along the Regents Canal (through the Maida Hill Tunnel) to the Hampstead Road Lock in Camden without going through a lock. The Nicholson guide states that the pound is 27 miles long.

In addition to waterways mentioned above, the pound also encompass the Paddington Basin and a private arm off the Grand Union main line, located just north of Norwood Top Lock, that connects Maypole Dock to the Grand Union main line (the canal arm, about 600 metres (660 yd) long, and dock were built in 1912–1913 at a cost of £27,670).

== Tourism ==
In other use since the outset, the canal, for some Londoners together with the Regent's Canal provided an easy way to embark on a holiday to the countryside within a mile of many Londoners who could afford the hire of a narrowboat. The Paddington Arm retains a present tourist function. These facilities in marinas and basins also support London's communities living on narrowboats. Some facilities are provided by the Canal and River Trust which administers many British canals.

== Developments and parks surrounding ==
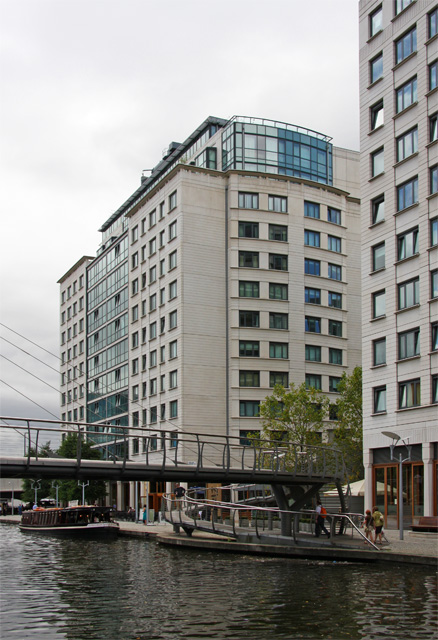
Sheldon Square, on the towpath side of the canal from Paddington Basin to Little Venice, and adjacent to Paddington Station

The London terminus, Paddington Basin, has public access integrated within a set of mainly commercial, high-rise, turn of the 21st-century buildings and immediate grounds which has received national awards for architecture; some are luxurious residential use. Buildings include the Queen Mother Wing of St Mary's Hospital and the headquarters of Marks & Spencer. The similar length 500 m channel to Little Venice is for more than a quarter of its length lined by the shops and apartments of luxury development Sheldon Square.

In places the canal forms the edge of public parks, between Greenford, Yeading, Northolt and nearest the city at Meanwhile Gardens, North Kensington (a part also known here as "Kensal Vale"). The largest park adjoining is Horsenden Hill, Sudbury. It forms one long boundary of elongated Kensal Green Cemetery, a Grade I diversely wooded site of 72 acres (0.29 km^{2}) featuring two conservation areas and grave memorials such as to Brunel and two British Princes; this continues with St Mary's Catholic Cemetery, Kensal Green where the interred include Mary Seacole, two Cardinals, a Bonaparte and two Polish leading spies against Nazi Germany: Andrzej Kowerski (aka Andrew Kennedy) and Krystyna Skarbek (aka Christine Granville). The cemeteries front the canal with a wall since the era of urban grave robbing in the 19th century and a disused gate. The opposite (south) bank is the towpath side which provides canal views from many buildings and those visiting.
