= The People's Advocate =

Nineteenth-century African American owned and operated newspaper

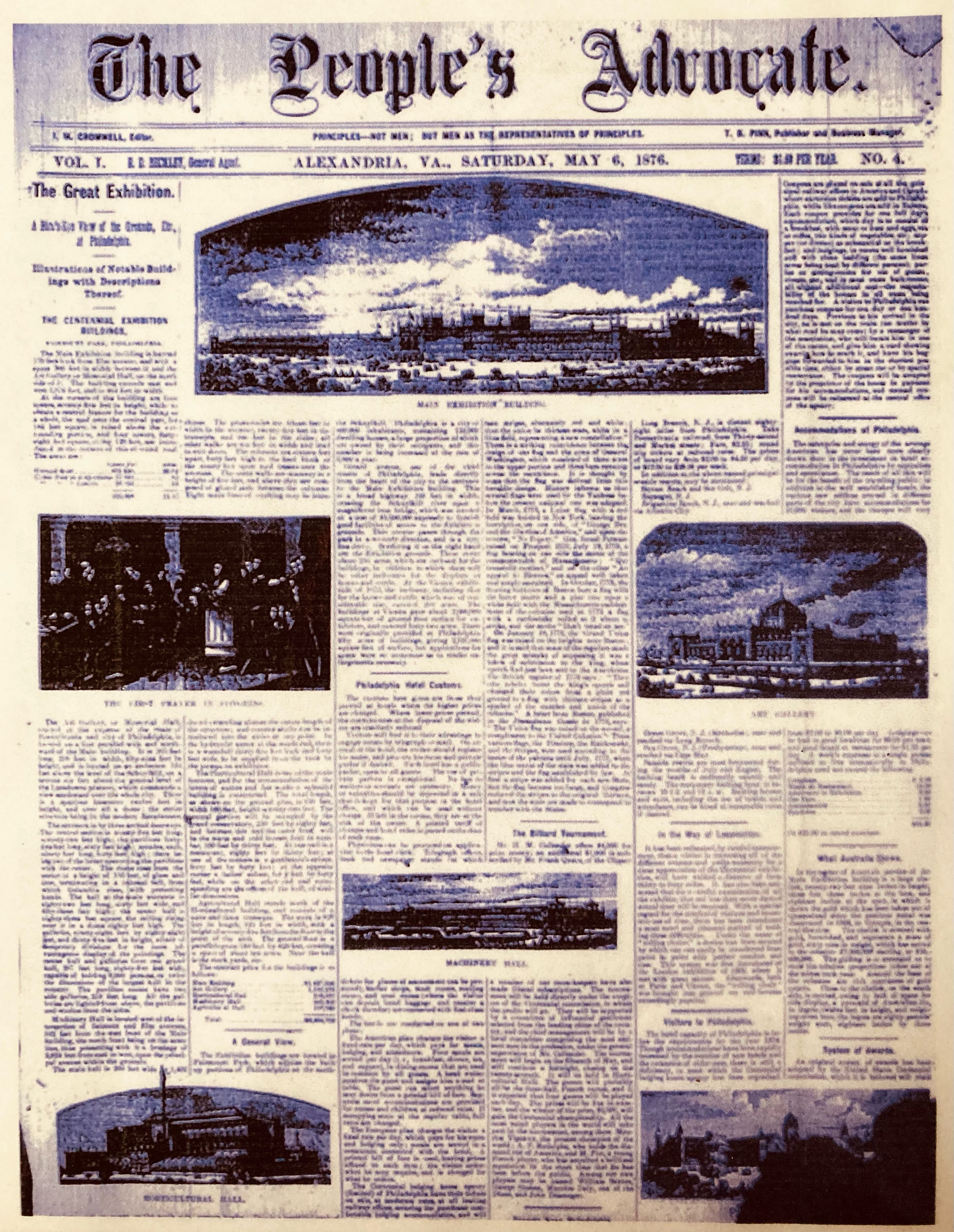
- The People’s Advocate Vol 1-No 4 May 6, 1876
- Type: Weekly newspaper
- Format: Tabloid
- Owner(s): Traverse Benjamin Pinn, Sr; John Wesley Cromwell
- Publisher: Traverse Benjamin Pinn
- Editor: John Wesley Cromwell
- Founded: 1876
- Ceased publication: 1890
- Language: English
- Headquarters: Alexandria, Virginia and Washington DC
- OCLC number: 10587978

The People's Advocate was among the first weekly African American owned and operated newspapers in the state of Virginia. It was the first African American newspaper in the city of Alexandria, Virginia. The People's Advocate moved its operation to Washington D.C. in 1878 and was published until 1890.

== History ==
The People's Advocate was a newspaper founded in 1876 by Traverse B. Pinn Sr. (1840-1888) who served briefly as its first publisher and business manager, and John Wesley Cromwell (1846–1927) who served as its editor. It was among the first weekly newspaper created for and operated by African Americans in the state of Virginia. Its motto was "Principles, not men, but men as the representatives of principles." In addition to the standard day-to-day news stories, it also reported on education, water rights, zoning laws, public transportation, and voting rights for the underserved and underrepresented African American communities. It was considered as an alternative to the often-biased news coverage of the dominant white conservative papers of the region such as the Alexandria Gazette.

In its early months of operating, it was endorsed by the Virginian Republican State Convention and widely distributed across the state. It was also funded and supported by the local Republican clubs in the city of Alexandria including the 4th Ward Republican Club Across the state, it received high praise for its coverage of issues pertinent to Black Virginians and for its elevated discussions of those issues. John Cromwell moved operations to Washington D.C. in 1878 and continued to serve the African American communities of DC until at least 1891.

The following is a quote from an early publication of The People’s Advocate: "Now that the pistol and bowie knife have begun again their murderous work in Mississippi and Louisiana, we may expect again to see the independent press crammed with sensational and unreliable stories about the general uprising of the Negroes to exterminate the whites. These outrageous lies at the beginning of each election year are manufactured to conceal their murderous outrages.”
