= Slough Arm =

Arm of the Grand Union Canal in the United Kingdom

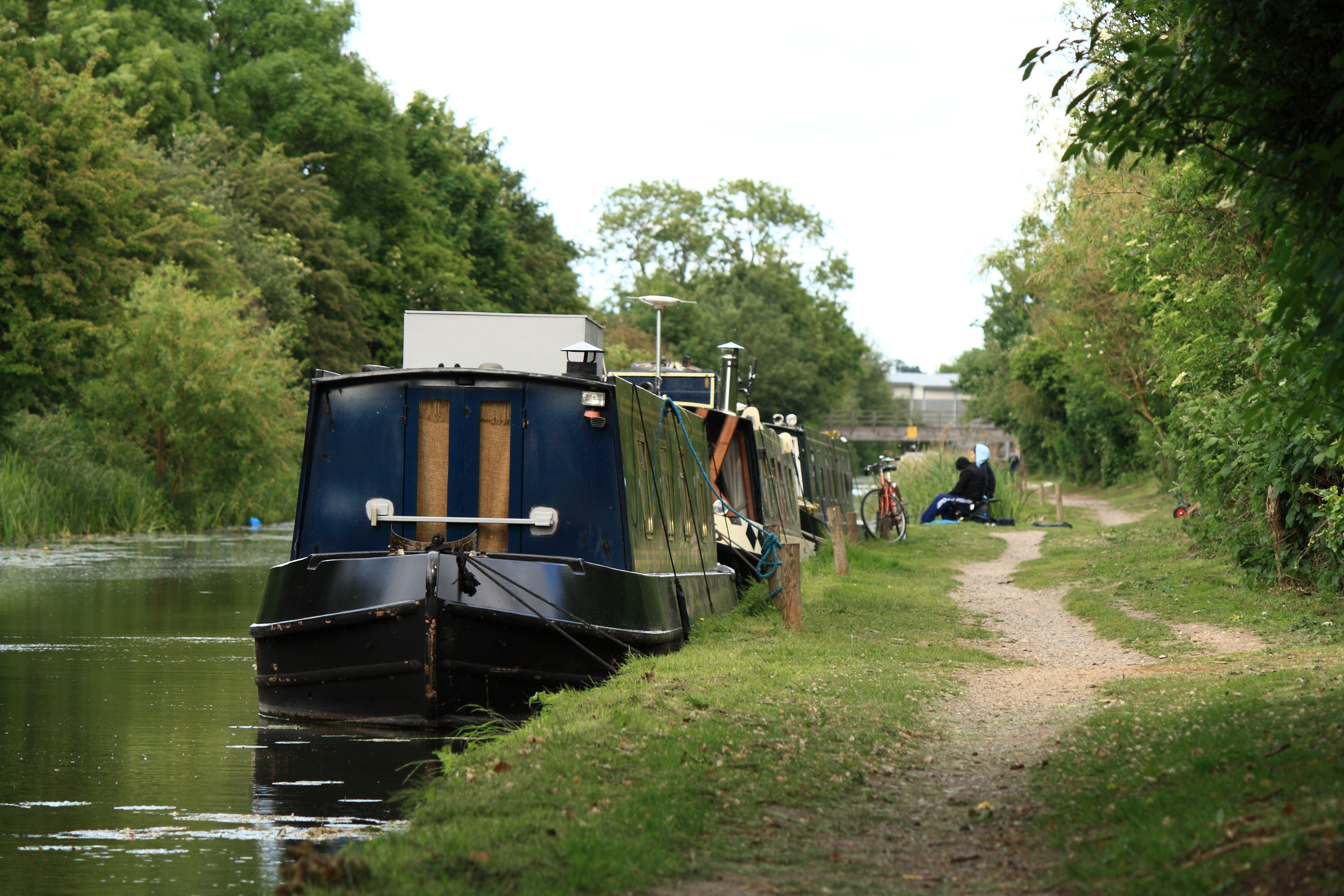
- The Slough Arm towpath at Yiewsley

Specifications
- Locks: 1 stop gate
- Status: navigable

History
- Principal engineer: Alfred Walker
- Date of act: 1879
- Date completed: 1882
- Date closed: 1960
- Date restored: 1975

Geography
- Start point: Slough
- End point: Cowley Peachey
- Connects to: Grand Union Canal

The Slough Arm is a short canal branch from the Grand Union Main Line to Slough in Berkshire (before 1974 in Buckinghamshire), England. It was originally opened to serve the brick-making industry. The last commercial traffic was carried in 1960, but as the plans to fill it in were opposed locally, the stretch was re-opened in 1975 and has remained in use since.

== History ==
Grand Junction Canal Act 1879
- Act of Parliament
- Parliament of the United Kingdom
- Long title: An Act for authorising the Company of Proprietors of the Grand Junction Canal to make a Branch Canal to Slough; and for other purposes.
- Citation: 42 & 43 Vict. c. clxxviii

Dates
- Royal assent: 21 July 1879

Text of statute as originally enacted

With the demand for bricks for the buildings of London continuing to increase, a canal branch to Slough was first proposed in 1878 by Hubert Thomas. It would run from Bulls Bridge on the Grand Union Canal (then the Grand Junction Canal) to Slough, where new brickworks would be opened. Thomas completed a survey in 1879, and the route was altered slightly, with the junction moving to Cowley Peachey. An act of Parliament was sought, which was opposed by the Great Western Railway, but despite this, the Grand Junction Canal Act 1879 (42 & 43 Vict. c. clxxviii) was passed in July 1879, although the Slough end was truncated back to Stoke Road, as the original terminus would have crossed lands owned by the Duke of Leeds and Eton College.

Construction began at the Cowley Peachey Junction in early 1880, overseen by Alfred Walker, who had recently constructed the Melton Mowbray Canal. The route included a major cutting and embankment at Iver, which were started in February and May respectively. By April 1881, work was also in progress at the Slough end. The major earthworks at Iver were completed in June 1882, and the canal opened throughout on 4 December 1882. It was about 5 miles (8 km) long, and did not require any locks.

Walker remained after the canal opened to oversee the construction of wharves and landing places, to sort out any problems resulting from settlement of the formation, and to ensure that traffic developed in a satisfactory way. This he seemed to achieve, for in 1905 the canal conveyed 192,000 tons of cargo, mainly bricks, sand and gravel, for which the tolls were £7,164. A number of tramways facilitated the carriage of goods to the canal wharves.

From the peak year of 1905, a steady decline set in. Cargoes of bricks and gravel sustained the canal through the 1920s and 1930s but by the 1940s, the deposits of clay and gravel were becoming exhausted. The pits were then used for landfill, which provided some traffic, and there was a trade in timber, which was delivered to Slough Wharf, but the last commercial use of the canal was in March 1960. With the British Waterways Board taking over the canals in the 1960s, the Arm was not considered worth saving.

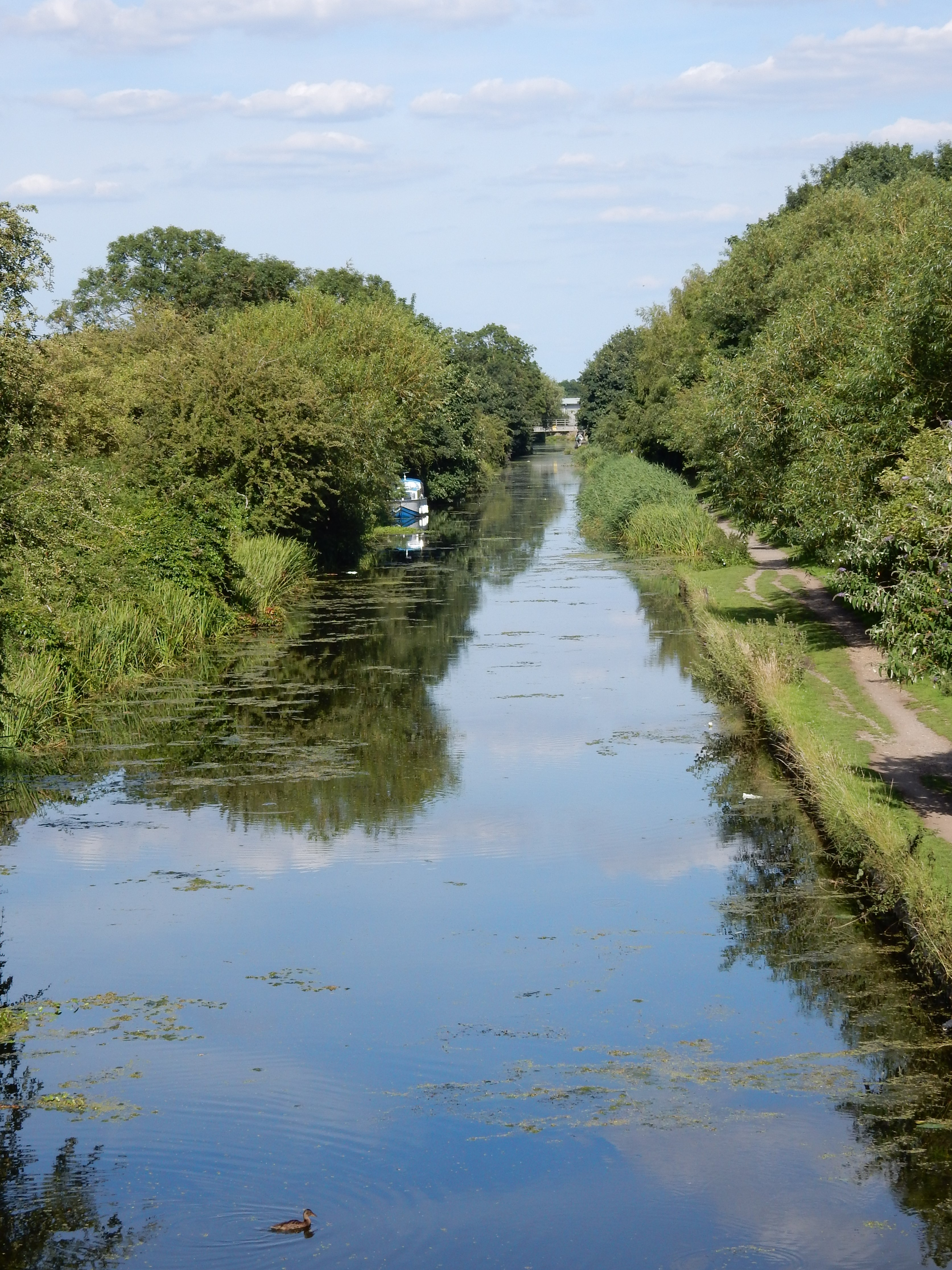
Eastward view from the Trout Lane Bridge, Yiewsley

== Restoration ==
With no likelihood of the canal being used again, Slough Council proposed buying part of it and building an access road for a trading estate along its route. The Slough Canal Group was formed in 1968, and fought a vigorous campaign to save the canal, supported by the local newspaper, the Slough Observer. They were successful, and the canal was re-opened in 1975. The Slough Arm was one of seven stretches of canal, formally designated as remainder waterways, which were re-classified by the British Waterways Act 1983. Under the act, a total of 82 route miles (132 km) were upgraded to Cruising Waterway Standard.

The canal was one of the last to be built in Britain, with only the Manchester Ship Canal and the New Junction Canal, which was opened in 1905, being built at a later date.

== Thames Link plans ==
There have been proposals to build a link from the end of the Slough Arm to join the River Thames, a distance of approximately 2.67 kilometres (1.66 mi) at the closest point in the centre of Slough. British Waterways (BW) have estimated that this would cost about £30 million. The plan was proposed in 2008, and confirmed in 2012 as a long-term objective when the economic climate allows.

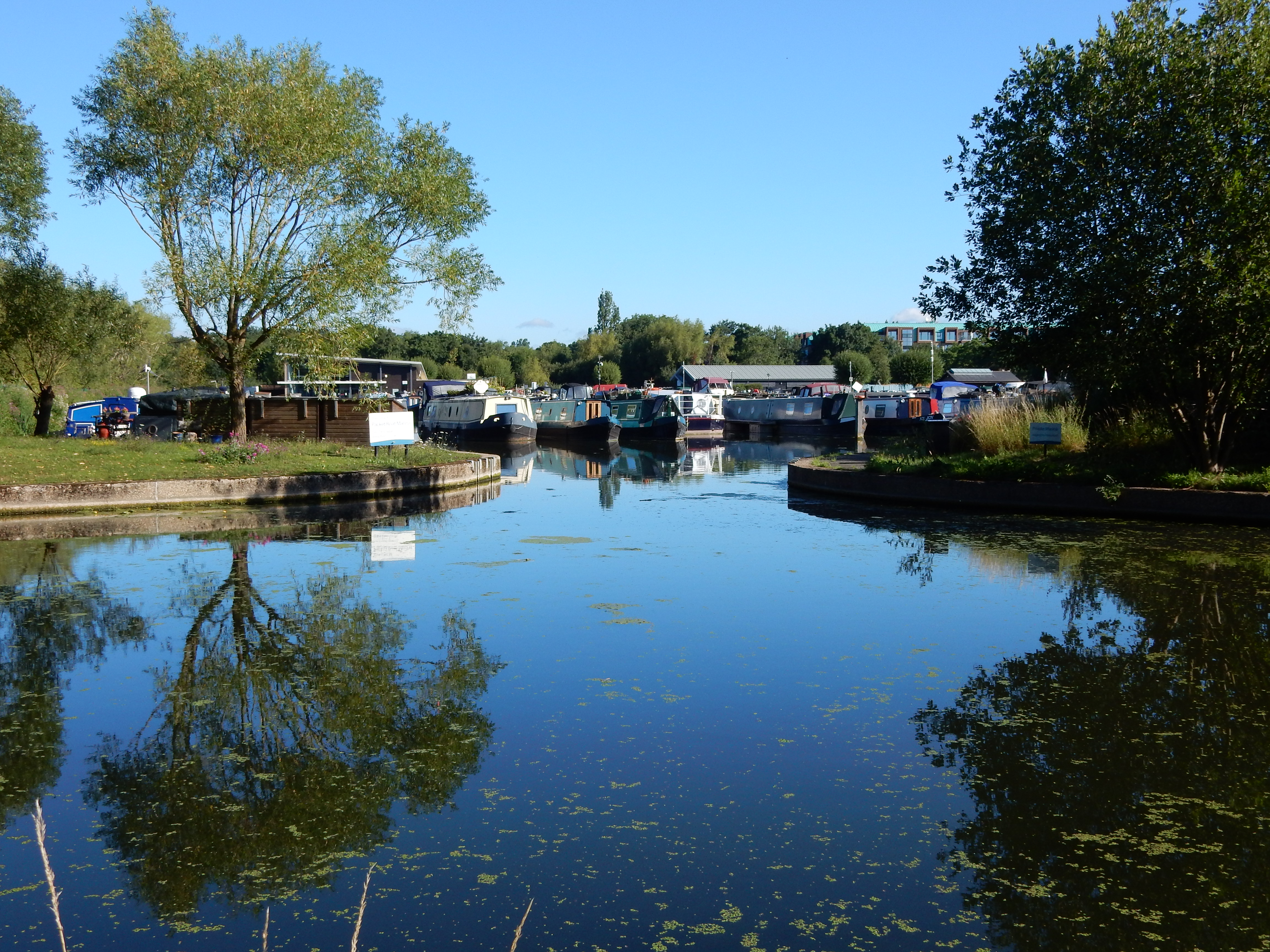
The Packet Boat Marina at Cowley Peachey Junction

== The route ==
The route of the canal starts at its junction with the Grand Union Canal, where there are a set of stop gates, and immediately crosses over the Frays River, the River Colne and the Colne Brook in three aqueducts. Passing under the M25 motorway, it enters the Iver cutting, to emerge near the main line railway from Paddington. The two routes pass along the northern edges of Slough, and then the canal diverges northwards, to end at Stoke Road. Apart from the last mile, it is rural in nature.

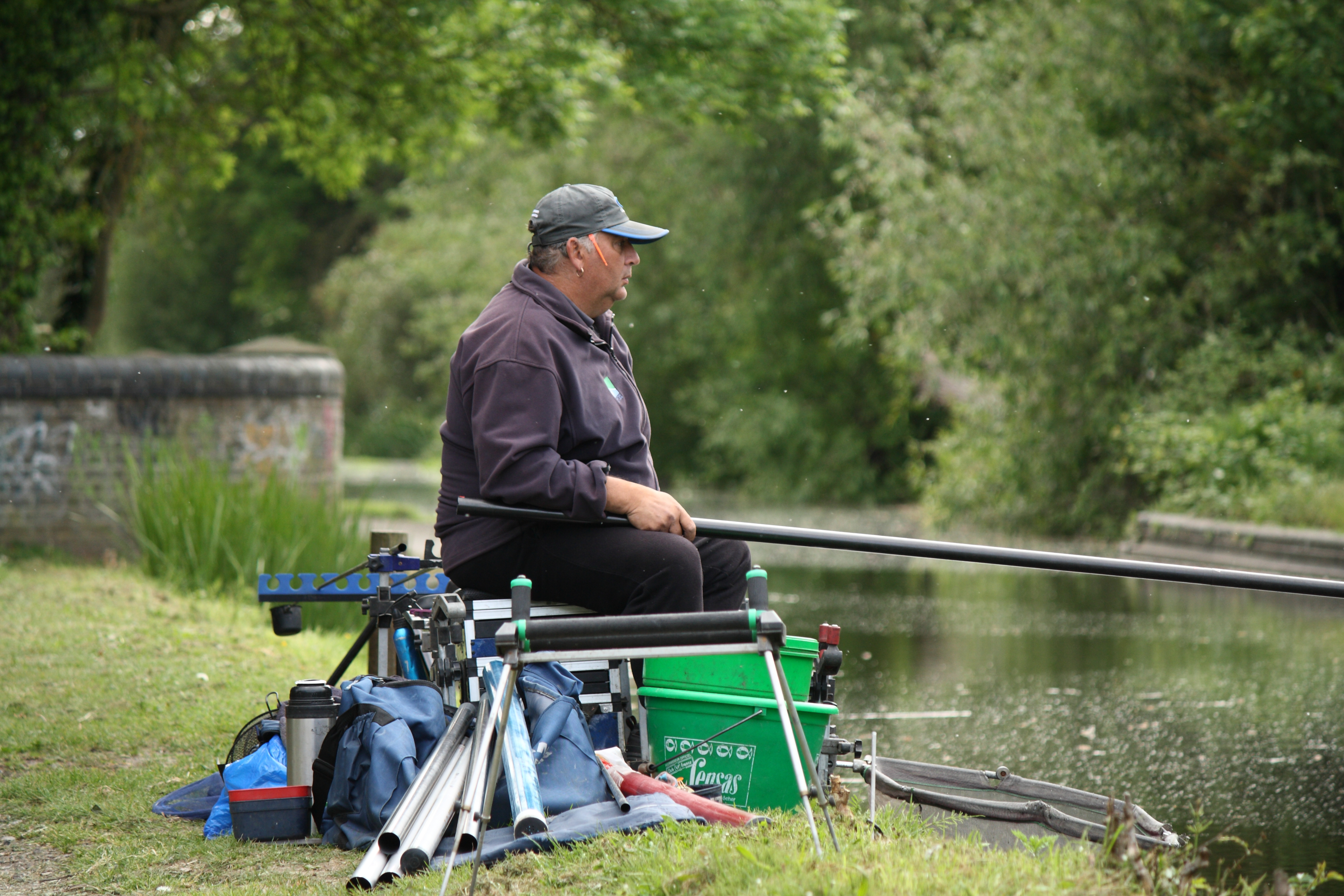
Angler on the Slough Arm

== Points of interest ==
Point	Coordinates (Links to map resources)	OS Grid Ref	Notes
Slough basin	51.5172°N 0.5892°W	SU979807	Terminus
A412 Uxbridge road bridge	51.5131°N 0.5740°W	SU990803	
M25 motorway bridge	51.5140°N 0.5014°W	TQ040805	
Cowley Peachey junction	51.5175°N 0.4802°W	TQ055809	Grand Union main line

== Bibliography ==
- Edwards, Lewis A. (1985). Inland Waterways of Great Britain (6th ed.). Imray Laurie Norie & Wilson. ISBN 978-0-85288-081-4.
- Hill, Richard (Spring 2003). "The Final Cut" (PDF). Canal and Riverboat (magazine). Archived from the original (PDF) on 6 October 2011.
- Nicholson (2006). Nicholson Guides Vol 1: Grand Union, Oxford & the South East. Harper Collins. ISBN 978-0-00-721109-8.

== See also ==
Media related to Slough Arm (Grand Union Canal) at Wikimedia Commons

- Canals of Great Britain
- History of the British canal system
- Friends of Slough Canal
