= Traverse Benjamin Pinn Sr. =

Civic leader and inventor (1840–1888)

Traverse Benjamin Pinn Sr. (November 6, 1840 - March 26, 1888) was an African American politician, civic leader, and entrepreneur. He served as a farmer, teamster, baseball player, barber, politician, storekeeper, clerk, messenger, businessman, journalist, inventor, and watchman. He co-founded The People’s Advocate, the first weekly newspaper in Virginia owned and operated by African Americans. Pinn also invented and received a patent for the wooden file holder, predating the metal filing cabinet by 20 years. Pinn died of a suspected homicide on March 26, 1888.
