= Yeading Brook =

Yeading Brook Upper part of the River Crane system.
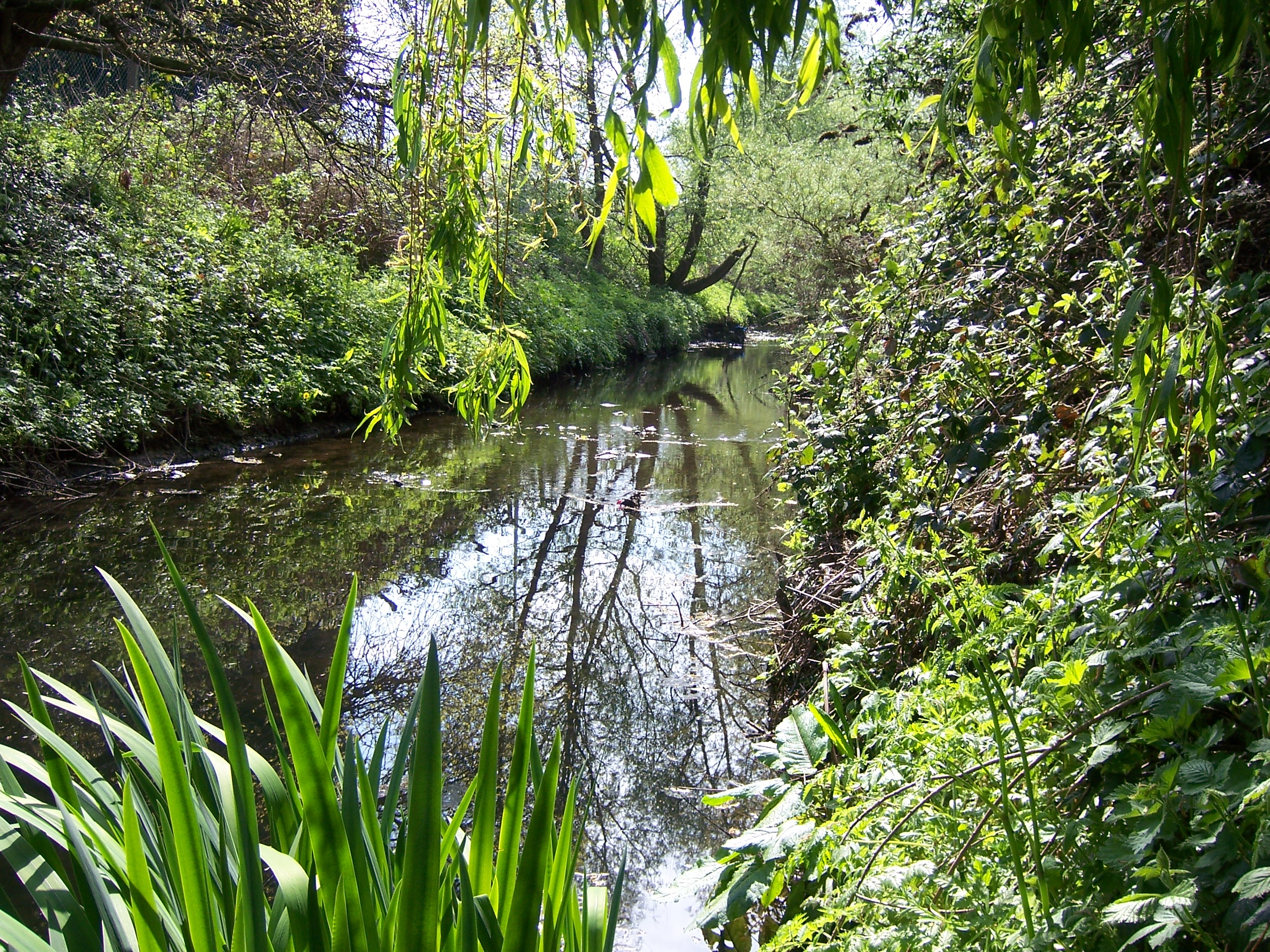
- The Yeading Brook flowing through Ruislip Gardens

- Point of the nominal transition into becoming the River Crane, London. The pale zone in which most of the water lies is the London Borough of Hillingdon. Note the apparent source in the London Borough of Ealing to the northeast is the unconnected Paddington Arm, a notable canal linked to another that passes over the brook.
- Etymology: The manor of Yeading

Location
- Country: United Kingdom
- Constituent country: England
- City: London

Physical characteristics
- Source: Headstone Manor
  - location: London Borough of Harrow
  - coordinates: 51°35′41″N 0°21′15″W
- Mouth
  - location: River Crane, Greater London
  - coordinates: 51°29′53″N 0°24′39″W
  - elevation: Not applicable
- Length: 25.8 km (16.0 mi)

Basin features
- Progression: Yeading Brook (east and west arms)
- River system: River Crane system
- Tributaries
  - left: Roxbourne Brook

Yeading Brook is the dominant source of the River Crane, in outer North West then West London. The western branch flows 25.8 km (16.0 mi) south. It rises in the far south of suburban Pinner and drains all of the western suburbs of Harrow, insofar as they have not been by historical practice connected into sewers.

Rapidly the brook coalesces at sports grounds associated with and including Headstone Manor, where there is a surviving medieval moat, and leaving the far west of Harrow it makes a large curve to adjoin southern parts of Ruislip then Ickenham Marsh nature reserve, before finishing the more than three-mile sharp curve on the south side of Northolt Aerodrome 1 mile (1.6 km) southwest of South Ruislip railway station. At this point the Yeading Brook's eastern branch feeds in as others have already from South Harrow. The brook bisects Yeading and then forms the traditional border between Hayes and Southall, being superseded by the unlinked Paddington Arm a few metres to the east.

The Crane has no authoritative source of its own and so the Yeading Brook – about double the length – forms the upper part of the Crane's river system.

== Detailed course ==
Yeading Brook rises

- By far most distantly as the West Arm. Headstone Manor house moat and its tiny feeder is its first visible section. This is within metres followed by other culverts in the associated sports grounds, draining a tiny copse and Victor Road.
  - The moat is fed from the west by 300-metre-long Melbourne Avenue, thus including the south-east corner of Pinner Park – the southwest of which has a small source of the Pinn and northwest of which briefly hosts its main headwater. The Pinn is a separate river system. The roofs, gardens and roads of the southern half of Headstone Lane also drain naturally into the moat or this short feeder.
- About 350 metres south of the moat in a cemetery the West Arm receives the local suburban road network's surface water drains as exposed as a garden feature of Brook Drive (north side houses) and now culverted as such for Moat Drive (south side houses). The east end of gardens on that side of Walton Road has two discreet sources of these minor flows.
- About 540 metres SSW a fresh water flow from Harrow Recreation Ground and all nearby streets is received.
  - 1.3 miles (2.1 km) (or 1.6 miles (2.6 km) in flow) southwest is sometimes comparable inflow to the above three sources, Roxbourne or Roxbourne Brook which drains central (station areas) of Rayners Lane and West Harrow.
- About 2.5 miles (4.0 km) (or 3.5 miles (5.6 km) in flow) southwest is the East Arm, which drains all of South Harrow and surface from Brook Retail Park.

The west arm thus sweeps the Brook's main curve, from which many tiny meanders have been lost through North Harrow, the west of Rayners Lane i.e. east Ruislip boundary, then the South Ruislip-Ickenham boundary (skirting RAF Northolt (former Hill Farm, Ickenham and Hundred Acres Farm, Ruislip) by an abrupt direction change from south-west to eastwards). Failing to drain to the site's south-east corner it is fed by the East Arm having passed there. The brook then settles on a south course. It bisects Yeading then forms the long Southall-Hayes boundary exactly, traditionally.

In its final reach it is directly west of the generally naturally elevated A312 "The Parkway" and of a notable point of a canal, the network of which is unlinked, due to overshoot by a canal aqueduct. This is Bull's Bridge (canal) junction of the Grand Union Canal and its Paddington Arm.

The river becomes the Crane at the bridge of North Hyde Road, which marks the straight northern boundary of the dominant manor and former medieval parish (and still of the Church of England ecclesiastical parish) of Cranford.

== Amenity to residents and visitors ==
It is 16 miles (26 km) long and walkable along most of its length.

It passes through or skirts eight green spaces, a mixture of parks, nature reserves and small open spaces. These comprise Yeading Brook open space, North Harrow, Roxbourne Park, Ruislip Gardens open space, Ickenham Marsh (where it joins the Hillingdon Trail), Gutteridge Wood and Meadows, Ten Acre Wood, Yeading Brook Meadows, where it augments the Grand Union canal walk and Minet Country Park, which has two very minor tributaries and their sources.

== Added tributary ==
- The Ickenham Stream lightly feeds the Yeading Brook directly upstream of the A40 Western Avenue. This was dug and lined in the early 19th Century to convey water from a Grand Junction Canal-feeder reservoir which in the 1930s became Ruislip Lido.
