= Spencer Road =

Spencer Road may refer to:

- Spencer Road Halt railway station, Croydon, London
- Spencer Road Wetlands, a nature reserve in Mitcham, London
