= Birdbrook (nature reserve) =

Nature reserve in Greenwich, UK

Coordinates: 51.4613°N 0.0333°E

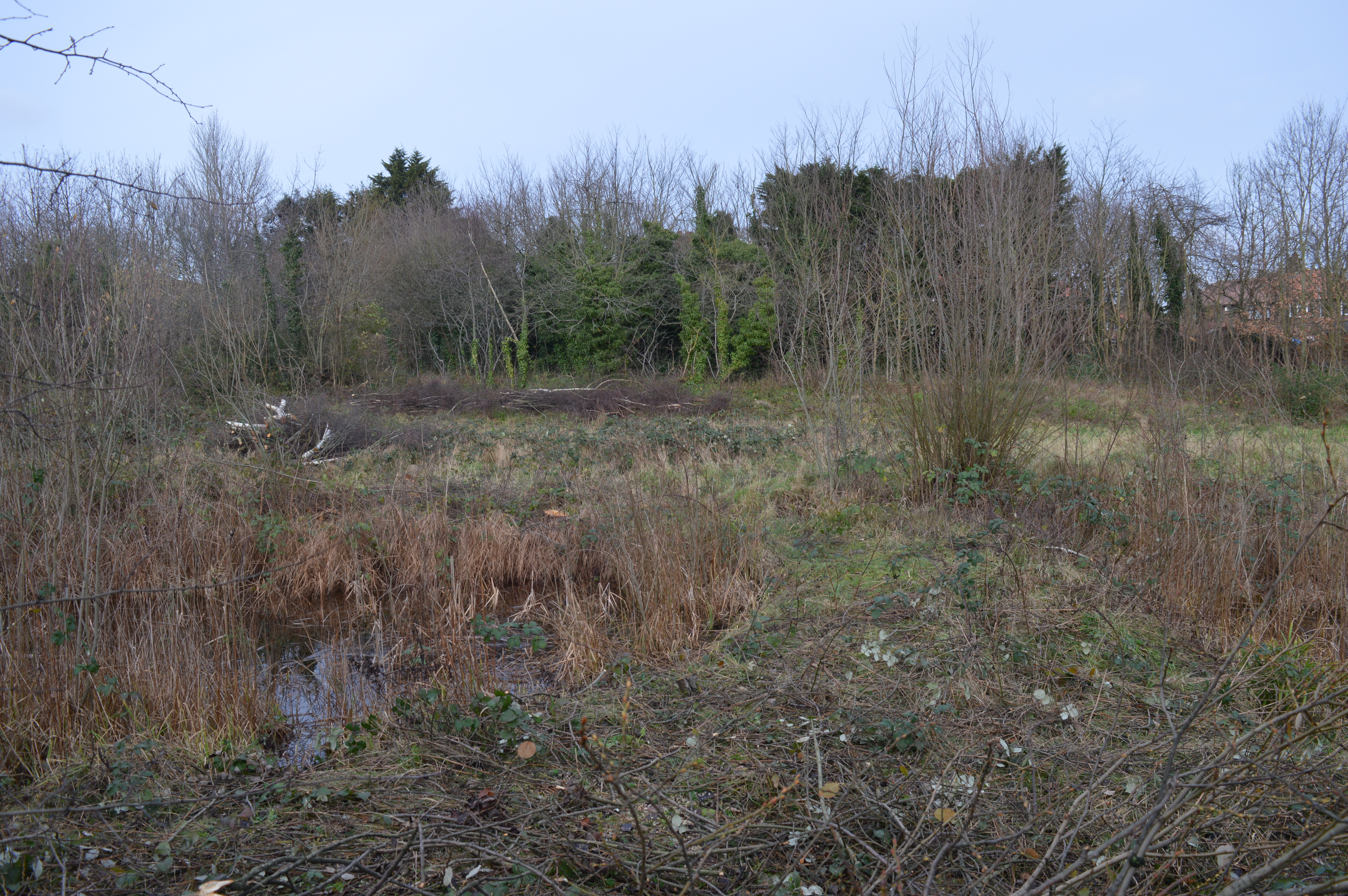
Birdbrook Road Nature Reserve

Birdbrook is a small nature reserve in Kidbrooke in the London Borough of Greenwich, which is managed by the London Wildlife Trust (LWT). It is a Site of Metropolitan Importance for Nature Conservation, and was considered for designation as a Site of Special Scientific Interest.

In the 1970s the site was a focus for the introduction of non-native amphibians and reptiles, and the LWT aimed to introduce native species. The site is described in 2015 by the LWT as one of London's most important refuges for amphibians. It has four ponds, grassland and scrub. Banks of broken concrete slabs, which are a remnant of the site's industrial past, provide a habitat for basking lizards. Other species include grasshoppers, bush crickets, dragonflies and butterflies.

There is no public access.
