= Redbridge Cycling Centre =

Cycle circuit near Hainault Forest in London, England

Coordinates: 51.606°N 0.127°E

Redbridge Cycling Centre is a road cycle circuit and mountain bike course at Hog Hill – near Hainault Forest Country Park and directly opposite the Forest Cemetery and Crematorium. The £5m cost of the facility was funded by the London Development Agency (LDA) as a replacement the former Eastway cycle facilities that were redeveloped for the London Olympic Park. The LDA funded the facility up to the completion of the legacy London Velopark. It was opened by Boris Johnson in August 2008.

In 2014, Redbridge Council agreed to purchase Redbridge Cycling Centre from the Crown Estate using a grant from the London Marathon Charitable Trust.

== See also ==
- Crystal Palace (circuit)
- Betteshanger Park
- Hillingdon Cycle Circuit
- Cyclopark
