= Hillingdon Cycle Circuit =

Road cycling circuit in London, England

Coordinates: 51.513°N 0.401°W

The Hillingdon Cycle Circuit is a purpose-built road cycling track located in Minet Country Park in Hayes, west London. The circuit, measuring 0.93 miles in length and 6 metres in width, is used throughout the year for racing, training, and recreational cycling.

== History ==
In the 1990s, Chas Messenger, the local British Cycling Facilities Officer, organised cycle racing on the unopened Hayes Bypass. It was on this temporary circuit that triple Olympic champion and Tour de France winner Bradley Wiggins began his racing career as a schoolboy.

When the bypass was eventually opened to traffic, Messenger and Bill Bannister sought an alternative closed road circuit in the area. After several unsuccessful options were considered, Minet Park was identified as a potential site. The park had previously been used to dump waste earth from the construction of the bypass but was designated for sports activities and community use.

Paul Barker, a member of the Westerley Cycling Club and a councillor for the London Borough of Hillingdon, played a crucial role in bringing the project to fruition. The circuit was designed by Don Wiseman to be fast and easy to ride, allowing cyclists to pedal through all the corners. It officially opened to riders in 1997.

Initially, the circuit's headquarters consisted of temporary huts. Over time, permanent storage facilities were established, partly funded by the Kenton Road Club. In 2010, a clubhouse was opened next to the track, offering meeting rooms, catering facilities, and a classroom.

== See also ==
- Redbridge Cycling Centre
- Crystal Palace (circuit)
- Betteshanger Park
- Cyclopark
