= Cyclopark =

Cycling facility in Gravesend, Kent, England

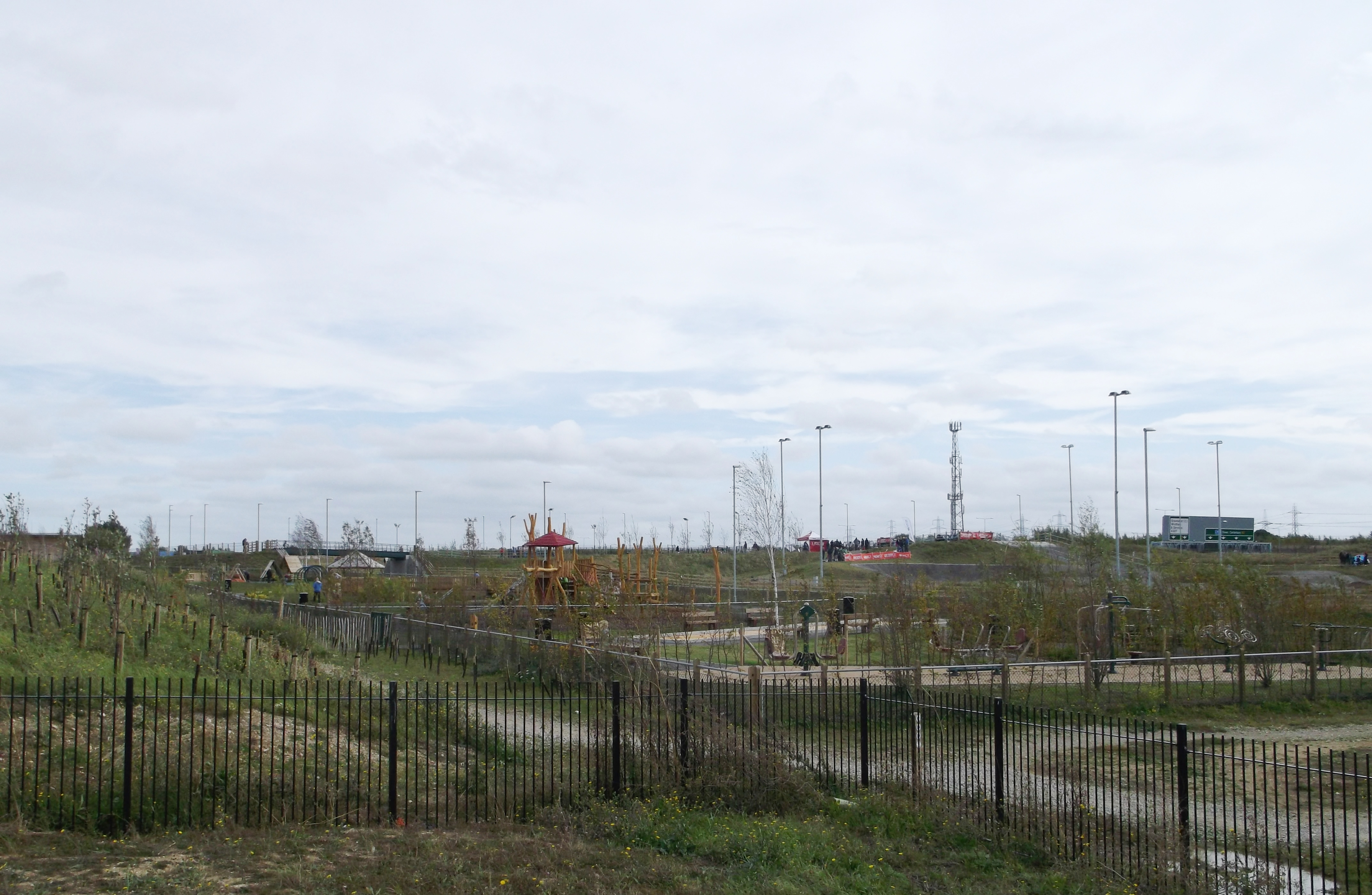
- Interactive map of Cyclopark
- Location: South Gravesend, Kent, England
- Coordinates: 51.4189°N 0.3524°E
- Type: Cycling and outdoor activity park

Construction
- Groundbreaking: January 2011
- Built: 2011–2012
- Opened: Early 2012

Website
- www.cyclopark.com

Cyclopark is a purpose-built facility for cycling and other outdoor activities, located on the south side of Gravesend, north Kent in south-east England, adjacent to the A2 dual carriageway.

== History ==
The site of Cyclopark is on the old re-routed A2 road near Gravesend. The redundant A2 route between Pepperhill (suburb of Gravesend) and Marling Cross (near Cobham) was developed into a safe pedestrian, cycle and equestrian route, which also passes Cyclopark, linking it to National Cycle Route 1.

Construction of Cyclopark began in January 2011 and took approximately 10 months, with the site opened officially in early 2012. Funding was provided by Kent County Council, Sport England, the Colyer-Fergusson Trust, British Cycling and the Homes and Communities Agency. It is situated in the area covered by the Thames Gateway development plan.

Early test events included the Southern Area BMX Championships (15-16 October 2011), and a visit from the US Olympic BMX team.

In 2014, it was on the shortlist for the 2014 Kent Design Awards.

== Facilities ==
In 43 ha of landscaped parkland, the Cyclopark facilities include:

- 6 km of off-road trails (graded to provide separate routes for different abilities)
- a 2.9 km long, 6 m wide tarmac circuit (capable of being extended to 5.3 km)
- a 340 m BMX track
- children's playground
- skate park

== See also ==
- Crystal Palace (circuit)
- Betteshanger Park
- Hillingdon Cycle Circuit
- Redbridge Cycling Centre
