= Yeading Brook Meadows =

UK nature reserve

Coordinates: 51.5288°N 0.4113°W

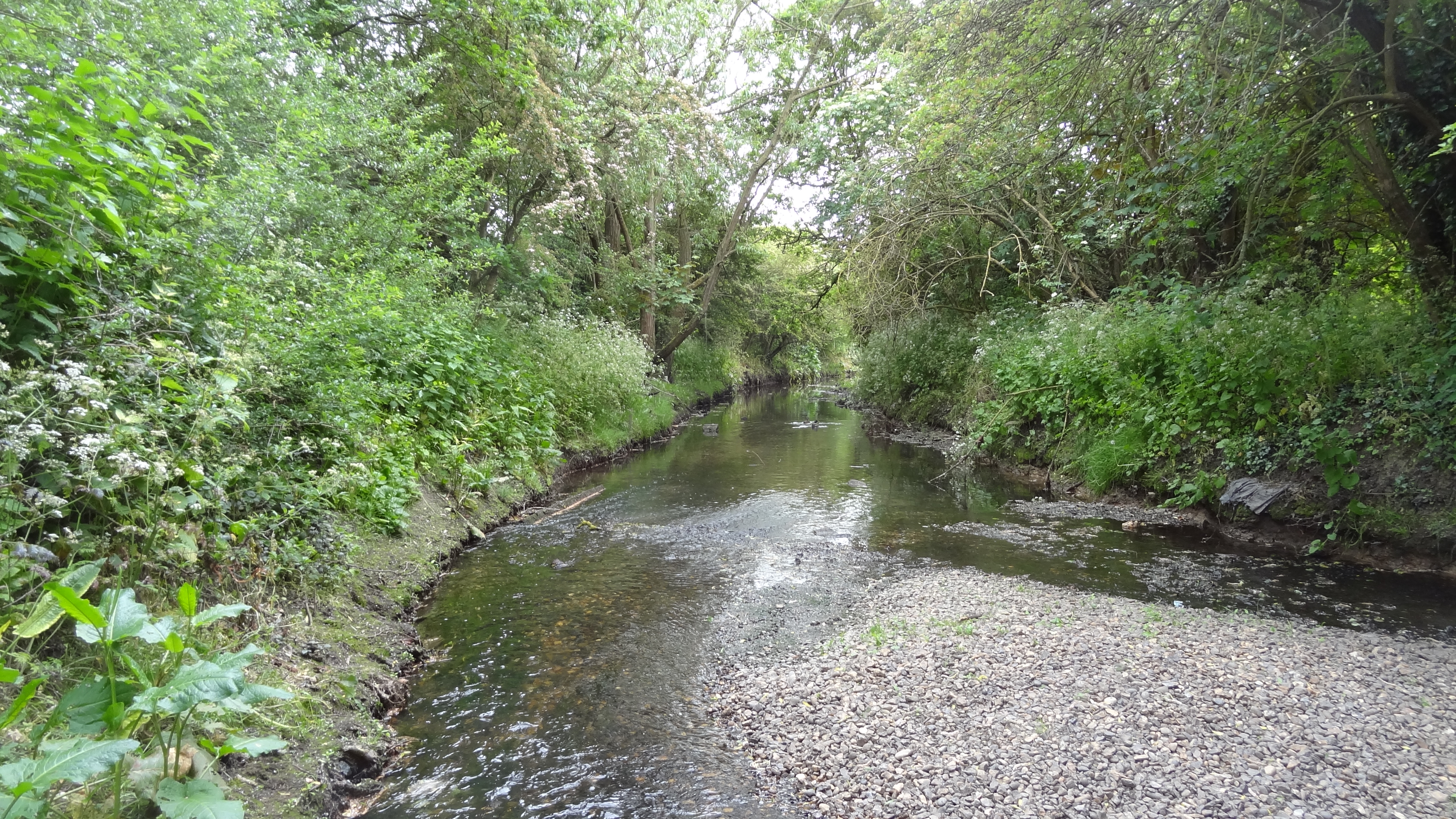
Yeading Brook in Yeading Brook Meadows

Yeading Brook Meadows is a 17 hectare Local Nature Reserve (LNR) in Yeading in the London Borough of Hillingdon. It is owned by Hillingdon Council and managed by the London Wildlife Trust (LWT). In the north it adjoins Ten Acre Wood across the Golden Bridge (over Yeading Brook) and Charville Lane; it then stretches south along the banks of the Yeading Brook to Yeading Lane. (Note: The Natural England map shows the site in the wrong area. Between Charville Lane and Kingshill Avenue the Yeading Brook forms the boundary between the London Boroughs of Hillingdon and Ealing. The Natural England map shows the site on the eastern Ealing side of the brook, whereas the LWT map shows the northern section of the site on the western Hillingdon side of the brook. The Natural England map for Ten Acres Wood is also wrong. It is labelled Yeading Meadows and shows the southern part of Yeading Brook Meadows.) The reserve is also part of the Yeading Brook Meadows Site of Metropolitan Importance for Nature Conservation, which includes two neighbouring LNRs managed by the London Wildlife Trust, Ten Acre Wood and Gutteridge Wood and Meadows.

The site is mainly grassland, with a variety of wild flowers such as the narrow-leaved water-dropwort and common spotted orchid. Invertebrates include Roesel's bush-crickets, shield bugs and skipper butterflies, and there are birds such as skylark and snipe.

There is access from a number of points including Charville Lane, Kingshill Avenue and Greenway.
