= New Cross Gate Cutting =

Nature reserve in the London Borough of Lewisham, England

Coordinates: 51.470°N 0.039°W

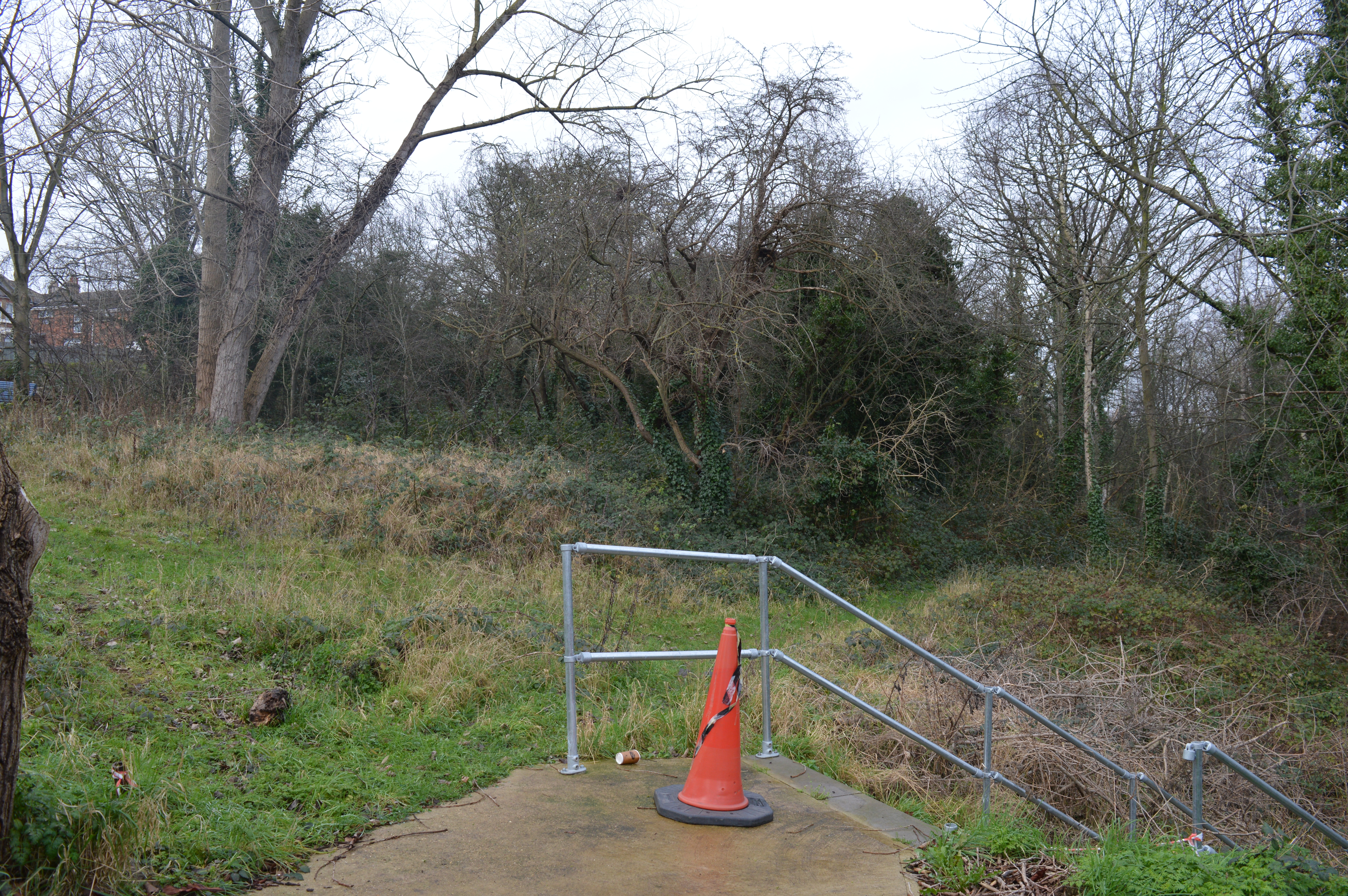

New Cross Gate Cutting is a 4.2 hectare nature reserve in Brockley in the London Borough of Lewisham. It is a Site of Metropolitan Importance for Nature Conservation managed by the London Wildlife Trust. This designated green space runs alongside the London Bridge branch of the Brighton Main Line between Brockley and New Cross Gate, on the forest site that once lay on the Kent and Surrey border known as Hatcham Wood. The entrance is on Vesta Road situated between Barriedale in Brockley and Sandbourne Road, Telegraph Hill.

The wood is a remnant of The Great North Wood and is currently managed by The London Wildlife Trust.

The reserve sustains a natural rare habitat for flora, fauna and wildlife including deer, however, it is mostly characterised by woodland such as sycamore, English & Turkey Oak, hawthorn and silver birch.

The site is generally closed to the public but there are regular open days and volunteer workdays facilitated by London Wildlife Trust.
