= Park Road Pond =

Pond in London, United Kingdom

Coordinates: 51.5508°N 0.4704°W

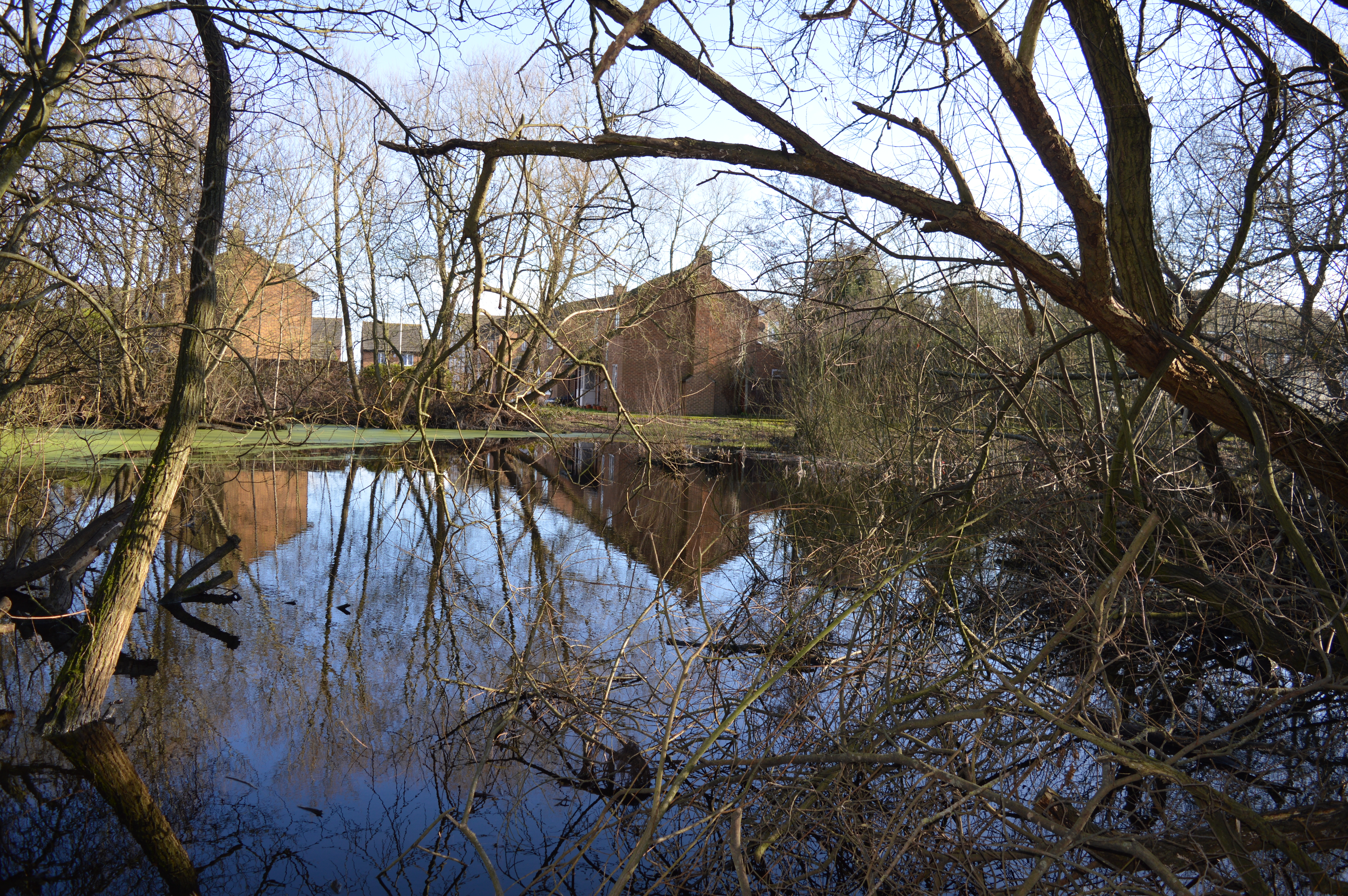

Park Road Pond is a pond in Uxbridge in the London Borough of Hillingdon. It is managed as a nature reserve by the London Wildlife Trust (LWT), and is a Site of Borough Importance for Nature Conservation, Grade I.

The pond is surrounded by willow trees, oaks and alders. Aquatic plants include yellow flag, water mint and gypsywort. It has many species of water invertebrates, such as pond skaters and whirligig beetles. It is described by the Trust as one of the most important sites in the borough for amphibians, especially great crested newts.

There is access from Brearley Close.
