= Wilderness Island =

Nature reserve in Carshalton, London, England

Coordinates: 51.3736°N 0.1578°W

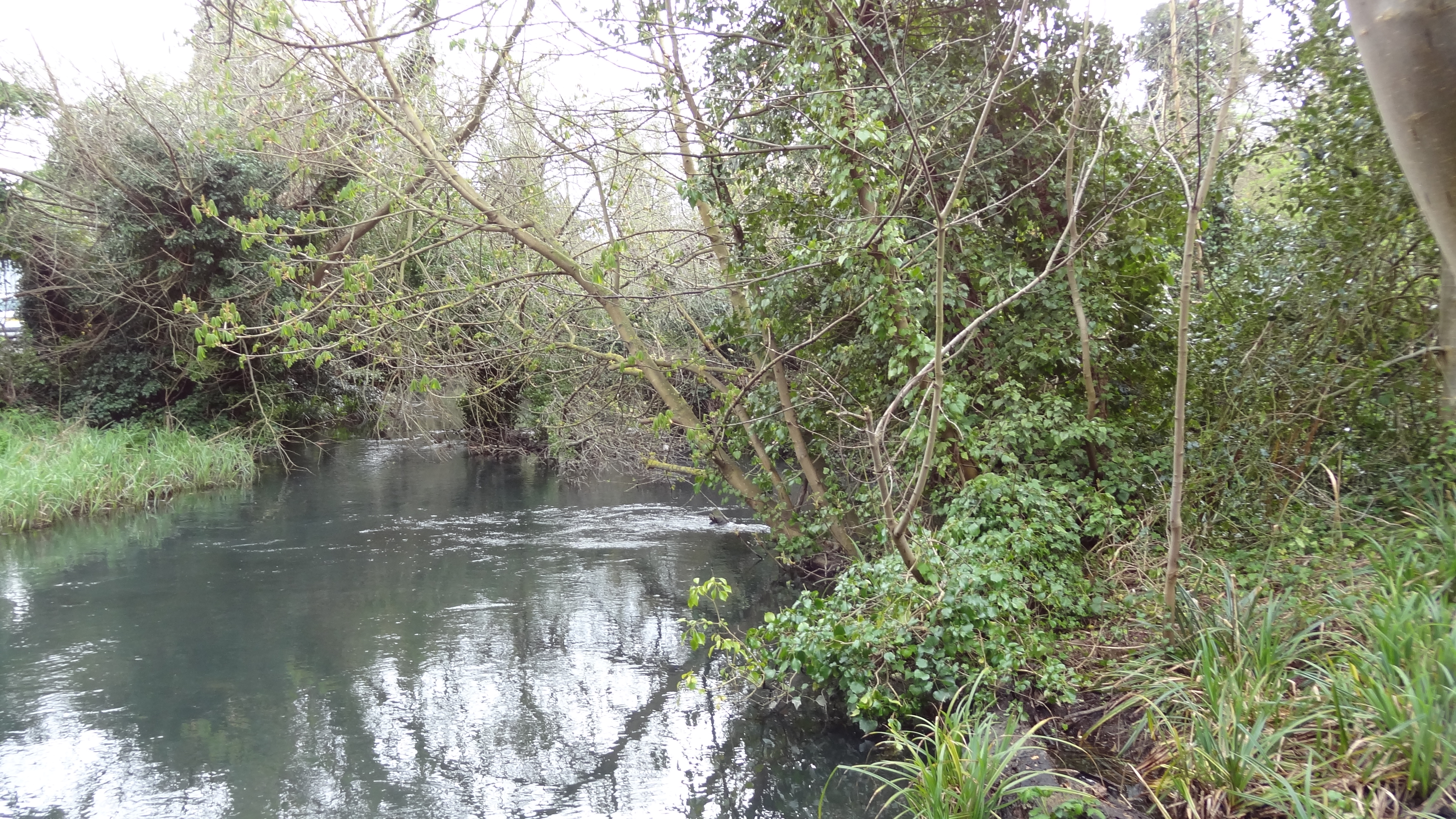
The River Wandle with Wilderness Island on the right

Wilderness Island is the 2.7 hectare island between the Wandle and Wrythe in Carshalton in the London Borough of Sutton. It is designated a Local Nature Reserve and a Site of Metropolitan Importance for Nature Conservation, is owned by Sutton Council and is managed by the London Wildlife Trust.

== Features ==
A fish pond still remains from a former public garden on the site. Other habitats are woodland, meadows and river. Trees include a black poplar, and there are birds such as the woodpecker, kingfisher and grebe. Butterflies/moths include the speckled wood, holly blue, and the rare hornet clearwing moth. The ponds are an important habitat which have a variety of wetland plants.

== History ==
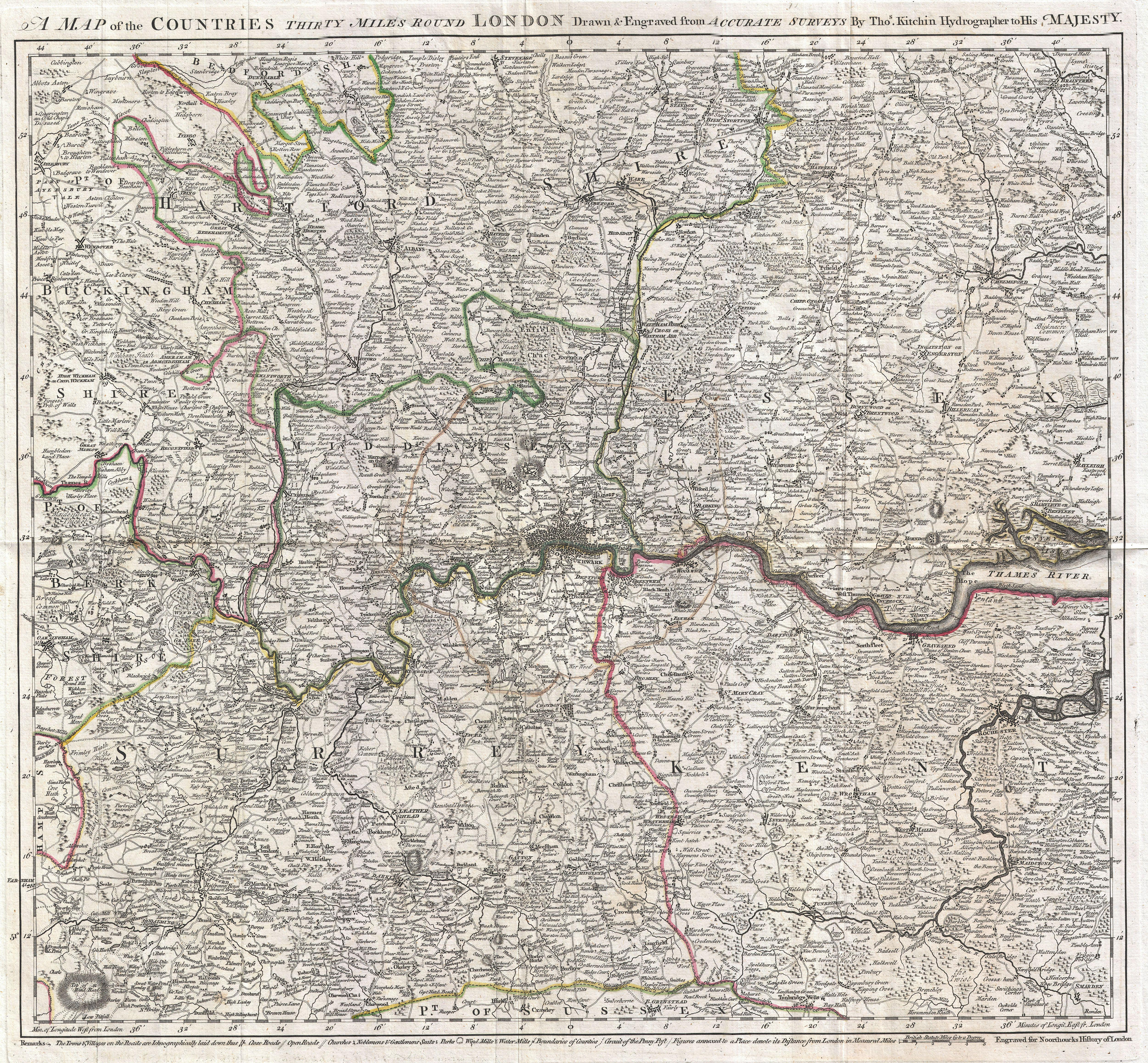
Extract from Kitchen's Map of the country 30 miles around London, 1773; its symbol denotes water mill per the legend below; the description of the site given is Copper Mills.

The island from the seventeenth century was the site of copper mills. It was later the site of a pleasure garden.
