= Huckerby's Meadows =

Nature reserve in London, England

Coordinates: 51.4736°N 0.4154°W

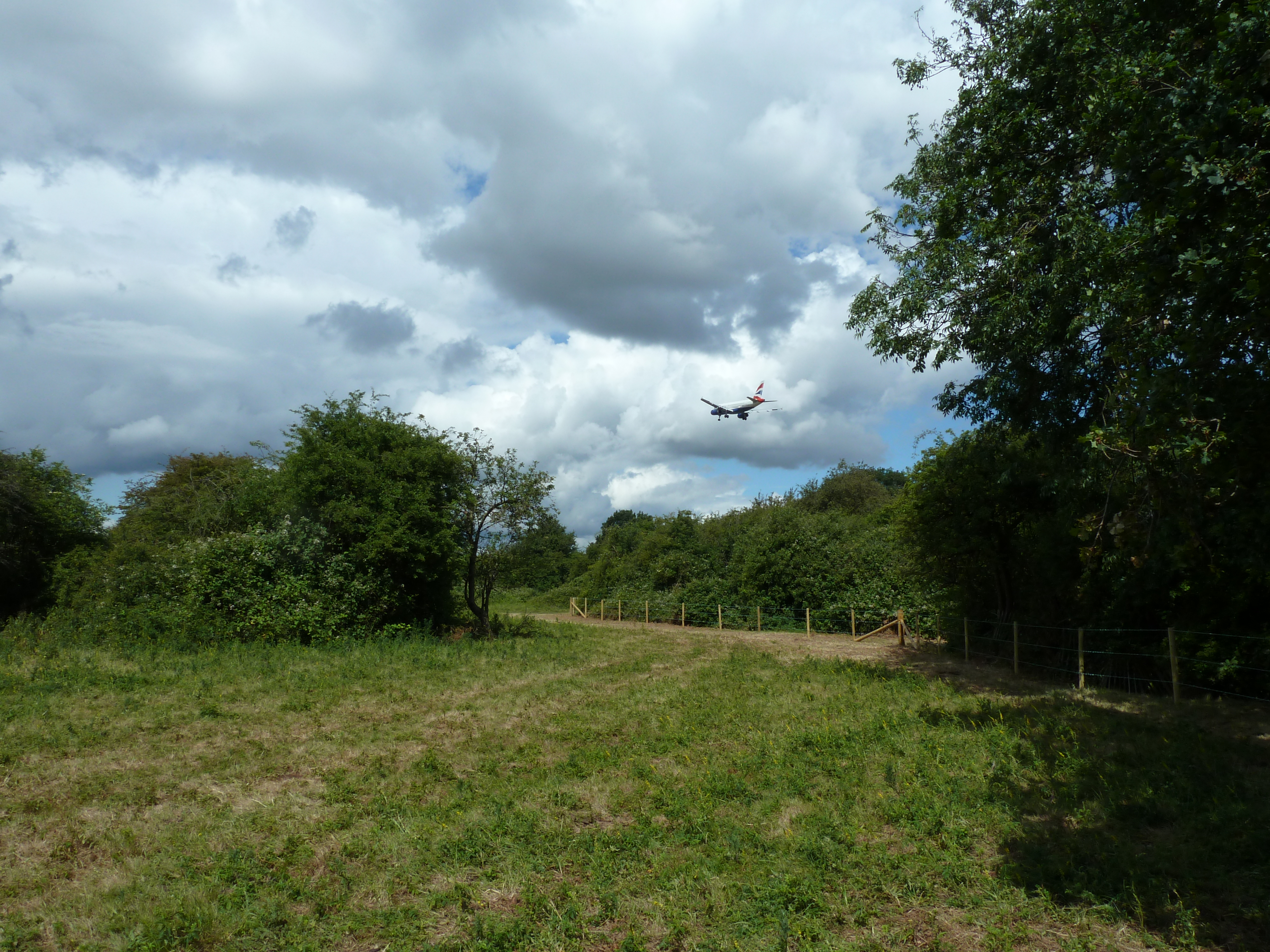

Huckerby's Meadows is a 13 hectare nature reserve adjacent to Heathrow Airport in the London Borough of Hillingdon. It is managed by the London Wildlife Trust, and is part of the Crane Corridor Site of Metropolitan Importance for Nature Conservation.

The site is located at the end of a Heathrow Airport runway, and on the west bank of the River Crane. The Trust aims at meadow management with the aid of cows which have been raised next to an airport, and so are used to airport noise. Wildlife include plants such as bugle, water-pepper and ragged robin, and small heath butterflies. Much of the site is open to the public.
