= Gutteridge Wood and Meadows =

Nature reserve in Yeading, London, England

Coordinates: 51.5461°N 0.4280°W

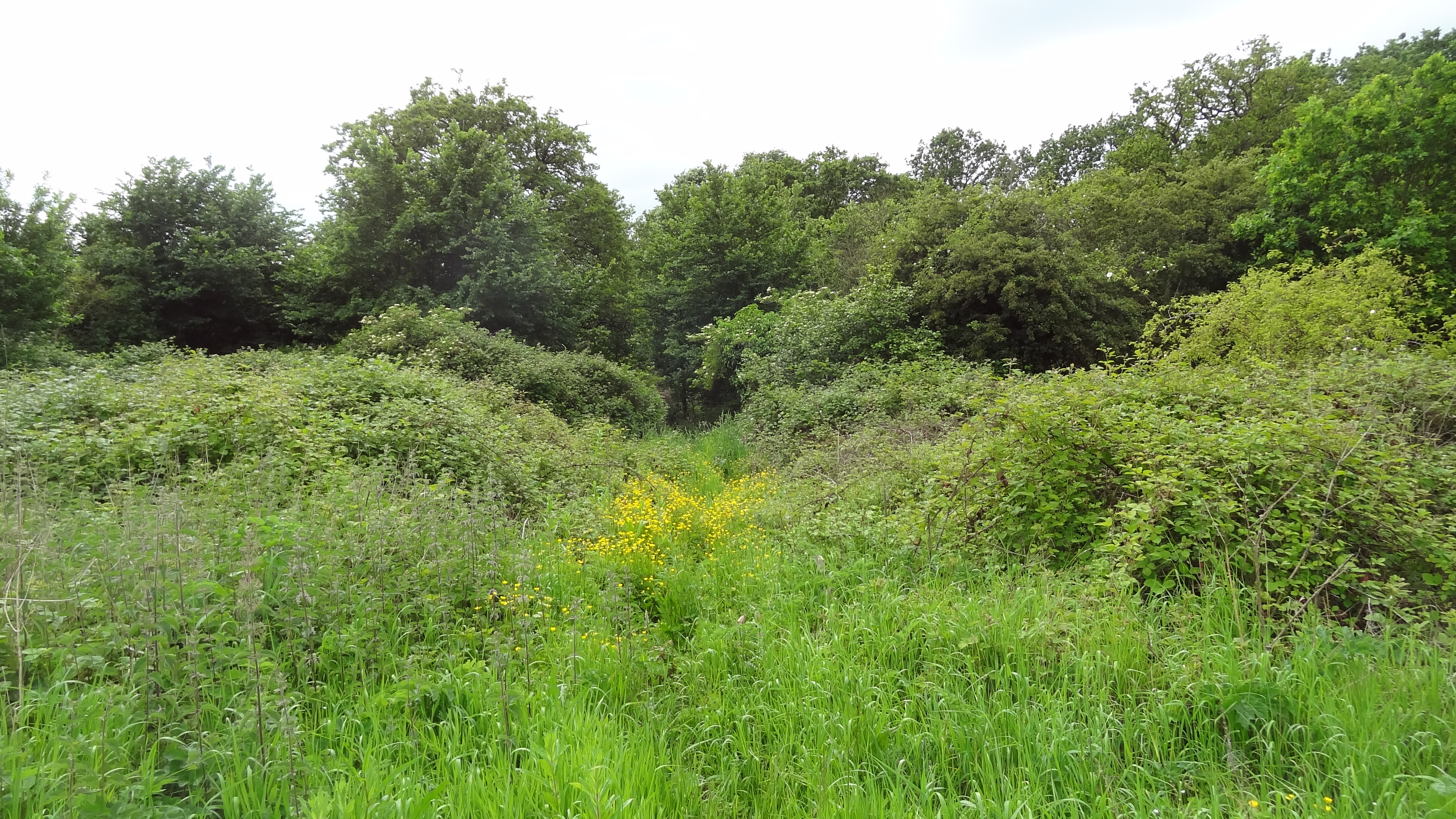
Gutteridge Wood and Meadows

Gutteridge Wood and Meadows is a Local Nature Reserve (LNR) in Yeading in the London Borough of Hillingdon, which is owned by Hillingdon Council and managed by the London Wildlife Trust (LWT). It is also part of the Yeading Brook Meadows Site of Metropolitan Importance for Nature Conservation, which includes two neighbouring reserves managed by the LWT, Ten Acre Wood and Yeading Brook Meadows LNRs.

The site is a mosaic of woods and meadows, bisected by Yeading Brook. The trees are principally oak, with some ash and silver birch. The northern edge of the meadow has a variety of wild flowers. Birds include kestrels, great spotted woodpeckers and kingfishers.

The boundary of the LNR is unclear. The LWT map and one on the Natural England information page show an area east of Lyndhurst Crescent and south of Western Avenue, consisting of 25 hectares (62 acres); however, the Natural England 'MAGIC' map shows the site as 'Yeading Woods LNR', and includes part of Ten Acre Wood, consisting of 31.59 hectares (78.1 acres) total.

There is access to the part of the site south of Yeading Brook from Lynhurst Crescent and by a footpath from Ten Acre Wood.
