= Centre for Wildlife Gardening =

Nature reserve in Peckham, London, England

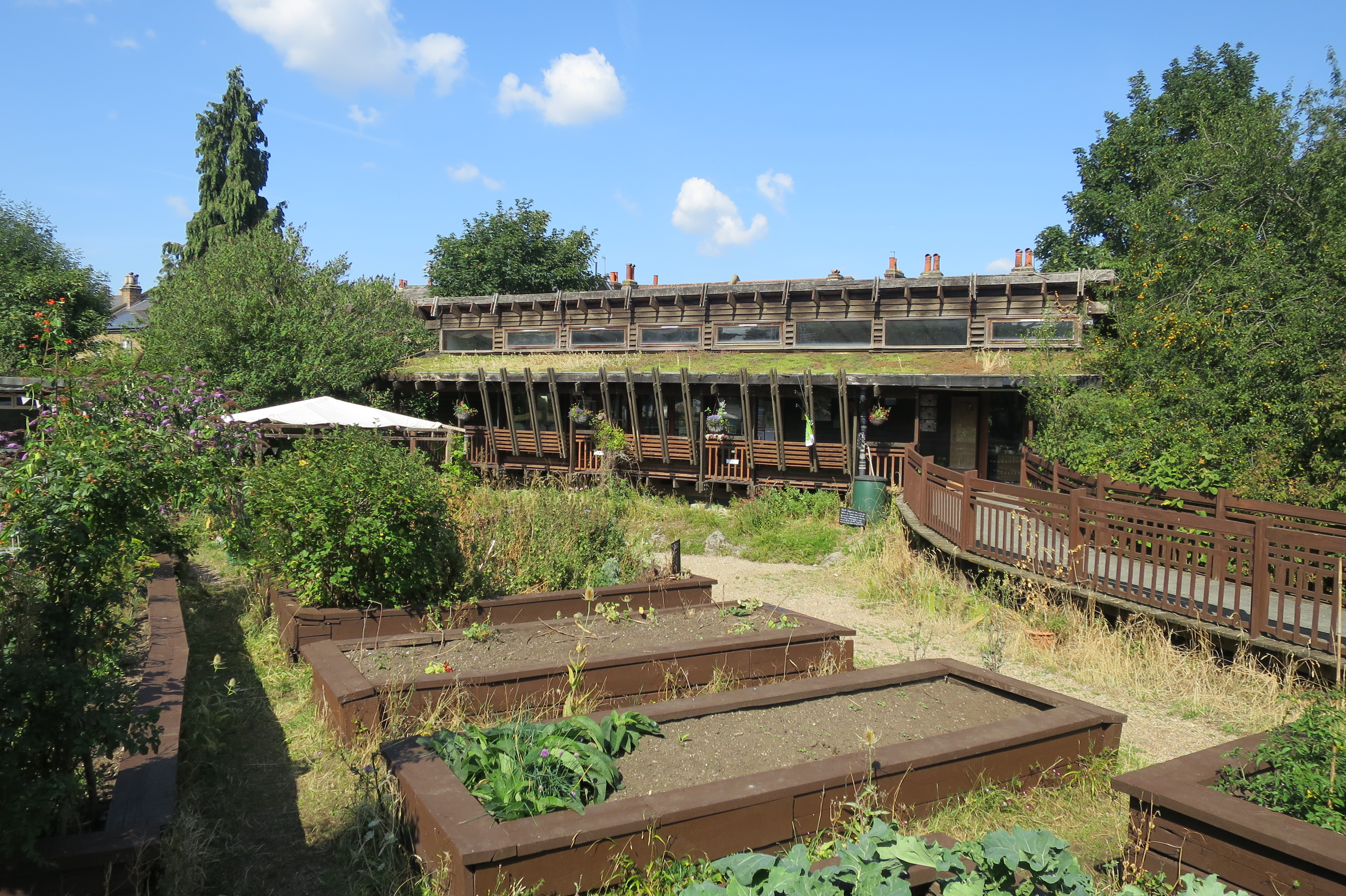
- Interactive map of Centre for Wildlife Gardening
- Location: 28 Marsden Rd, London, United Kingdom
- Nearest city: London
- Coordinates: 51.4629°N 0.0752°W
- Area: 0.22 ha (0.54 acres)
- Created: 1989
- Operator: London Wildlife Trust

The Centre for Wildlife Gardening is a 0.22-hectare (0.54-acre) nature reserve and educational facility in Peckham in the London Borough of Southwark. It is owned by Southwark Council and managed by the London Wildlife Trust. It is a Site of Borough Importance for Nature Conservation, Grade I.

Formerly a council depot for the parking of utility vehicles, the centre was organized in 1989 by the London Wildlife Trust. It comprises a wildlife garden with a range of habitats, a nursery for wild flowers and raised beds for community use. It hosts other habitats such as a chalk bank with wild flowers, meadows, a woodland copse, a bog garden, a roof garden, and two ponds with frogs, newts and dragonflies. It has been popular with those interested in native species, with local residents and with students. It hosts educational and entertainment events for adults and children. The centre has received multiple awards.

In 2010, it began operating the Bellenden Road Nature Garden.
