= Ten Acre Wood =

Nature reserve in London, England

Coordinates: 51.5428°N 0.41652°W

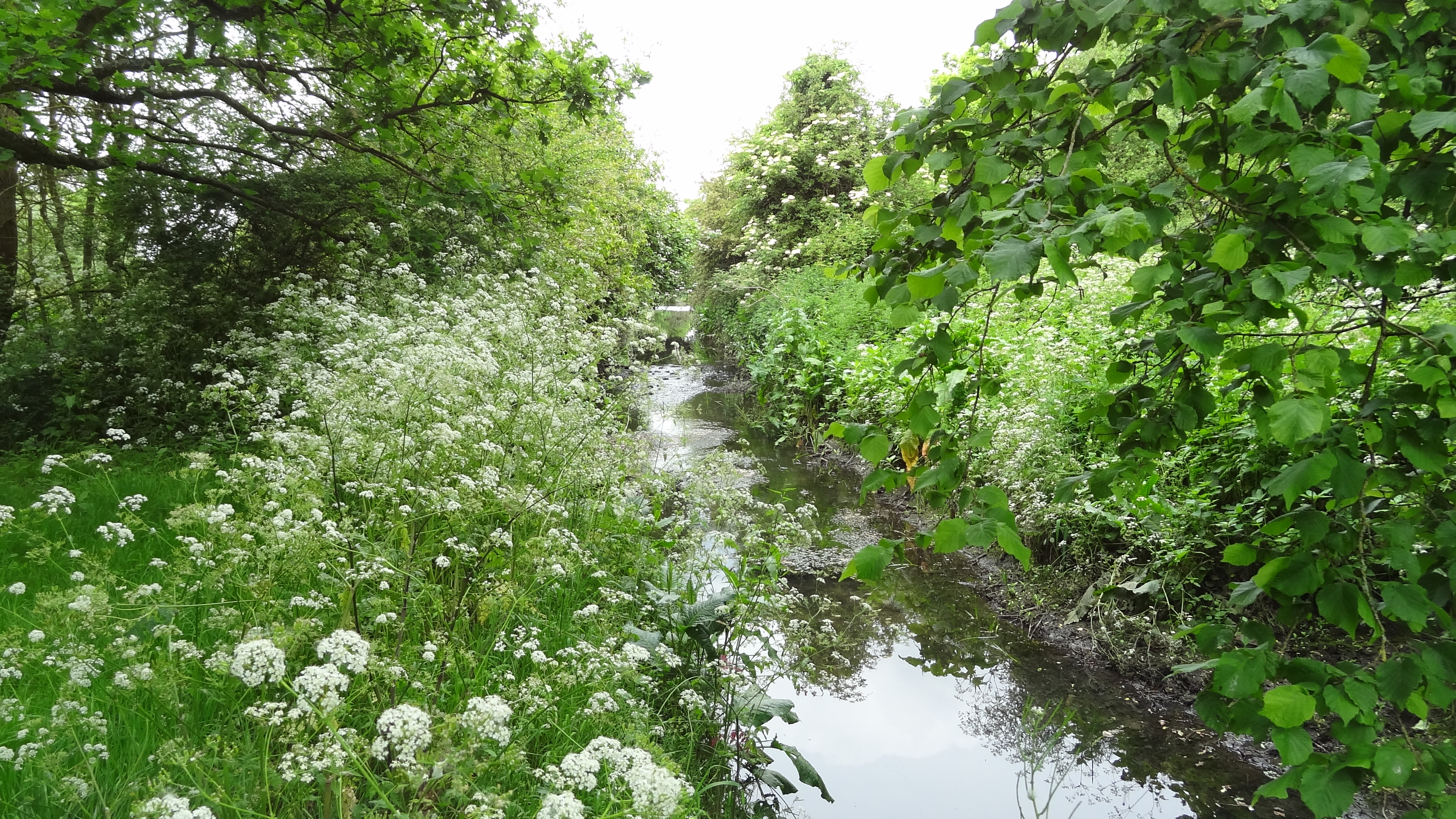
Yeading Brook in Ten Acre Wood

Ten Acre Wood is a Local Nature Reserve (LNR) in Yeading in the London Borough of Hillingdon, which is owned by Hillingdon Council and managed by the London Wildlife Trust (LWT). It is also part of the Yeading Brook Meadows Site of Metropolitan Importance for Nature Conservation (SINC), which includes two neighbouring LNRs managed by the LWT, Gutteridge Wood and Meadows and Yeading Brook Meadows LNR. (Note: Yeading Brook Meadows is the name given both to the large SINC and the smaller LNR within it. Greenspace Information for Greater London describes the reserves as three separate LNRs. Natural England appears to say that Ten Acre Wood and Gutteridge Wood are one LNR called Yeading Woods, but their information is confused. The map for Yeading Woods includes part of Ten Acre Wood, while the Ten Acre Wood details page links to a map of the wrong site (showing part of Yeading Brook Meadows and labelled Yeading Meadows).)

The site is composed of two areas of woodland adjoining at one corner. It is a hundred year old oak plantation with an underlayer of hawthorn and blackthorn. Yeading Brook runs through the wood, and it has areas of marsh and meadow. Birds include hobbies and kingfishers, and there are invertebrates such as Roesel's bush crickets, long winged coneheads and gatekeeper butterflies.

The site adjoins Yeading Brook Meadows to the south across Charville Lane and the Golden Bridge across the brook. In the north of the wood a footpath leads west across the brook to Gutteridge Wood and Meadows.
