= A312 road =

Road in London

Coordinates: 51.4960°N 0.4096°W

A312

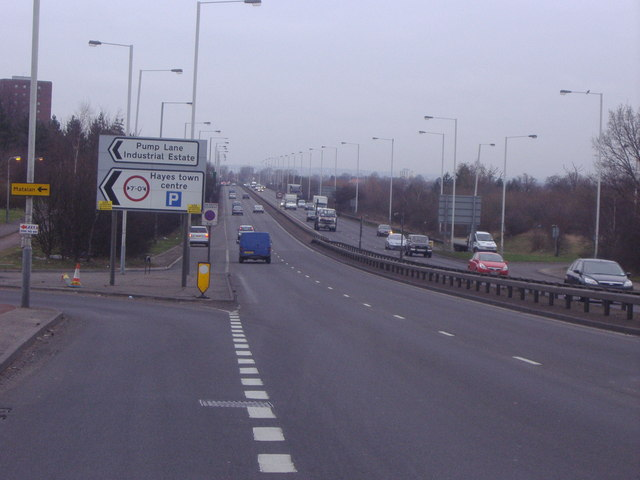
- View of the A312 road ('The Parkway') in Hayes

Route information
- Length: 13.5 mi (21.7 km)

Major junctions
- North end: Harrow
- A404 A4005 A4090; A40 A4180 A4020 A437 M4; A4; A30 A315 A244 A314 A316 A305 A313 A311
- South end: Hampton

Location
- Country: United Kingdom
- Primary destinations: Heathrow Airport

Road network
- Roads in the United Kingdom; Motorways; A and B road zones
← A311	→ A313

The A312 is an A road in England, running across west London from Hampton to Harrow. Its status varies from a local urban street to a major dual carriageway in Hayes. Part the road has been diverted to make way for Heathrow Airport, while another stretch was originally planned to be Ringway 3, one of four major ring motorways around London.

== Route ==
The road is part primary, part non-primary, which reflects its status as a mix of local and regionally important traffic. The primary section of the road, under the name The Parkway (and part of it as Hayes Bypass), is a 5-mile dual carriageway trunk road with speed limits of 30 to 50 mph, running north–south from Northolt's Target Roundabout to the A30 interchange in Hatton.

The non-primary section is mostly a single carriageway and consist of urban roads, particularly the northern part, where it serves as the main road through Northolt and South Harrow. The southern end goes through more residential areas and ends at the foot of Bushy Park. The A308 to Hampton Court Palace and Sunbury-on-Thames is a short distance to the south.

== History ==
Originally, the middle section from Hatton to Hayes ran via Harlington. This road from Hatton to Harlington (then a country road) was demolished in the 1940s during the construction of Heathrow Airport - the northern half of the road in Harlington remains today as the A437, High Street. The A312 itself was rerouted from Hatton via a new road through Cranford to Hayes which opened c. 1959, again via today's A437 (North Hyde Road).

Later, a new road called The Causeway was built, cutting between the two balancing reservoirs of Heathrow's water pollution control. The A312 no longer went via the centre of Hatton (by Hatton Cross tube station) and joining the A30, instead going straight from Faggs Road via The Causeway to The Parkway.

=== London Ringways ===
The section of the road between Heathrow and Hayes was originally planned to be part of the Ringway 3 scheme, one of four concentric ring roads around London as part of the London Ringways project. In 1969, the Greater London Council widened the A312 north of the A30 near Heathrow to dual carriageway. Named The Parkway, it was intended to eventually become Ringway 3. In November 1975, the Transport Minister John Gilbert announced that the sections of Ringway 3 in south and west London, including the Parkway, were cancelled. They would be replaced by the M25, running further away from London.

=== Hayes Bypass ===
The Hayes Bypass section of The Parkway was opened, after long delay, in September 1992, cutting through Bulls Bridge, Pump Lane Industrial Estate and Yeading. The A312 thus also no longer went through Yeading Lane, the main road of Yeading, and that was afterwards changed to a local road. The bypass also led to the creation of White Hart Roundabout, named after a pub nearby.

At the time, the town centre of Hayes and Old Southall were heavily congested beyond its supply. This was partly because there was no direct link between the A40 Western Avenue at Northolt and the M4 motorway (which leads to Heathrow). Although supported by the local councils (Hounslow, Hillingdon, Ealing) and the Greater London Council, the Hayes Bypass was long delayed, and construction would not start until the late 1980s.

The new trunk road provided relief to Hayes town centre and eventually led to it to be pedestrianised.

== Gallery ==
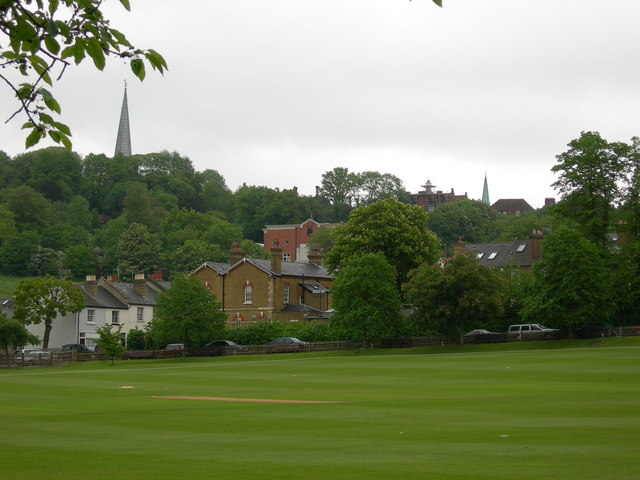
A312 Lower Road, looking east towards West Street and Harrow on the Hill

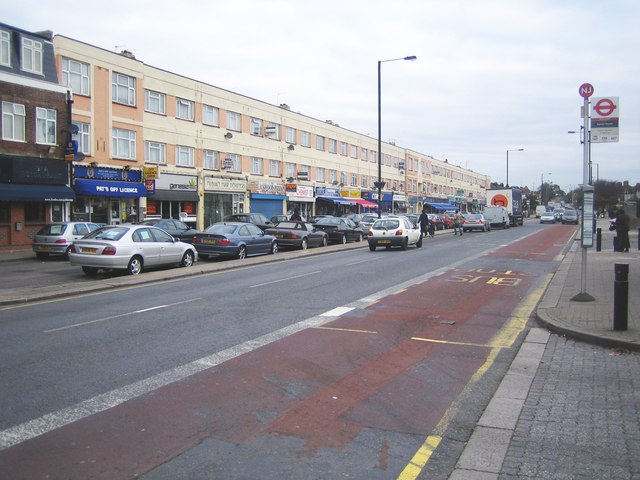
A312 Northolt Road in South Harrow

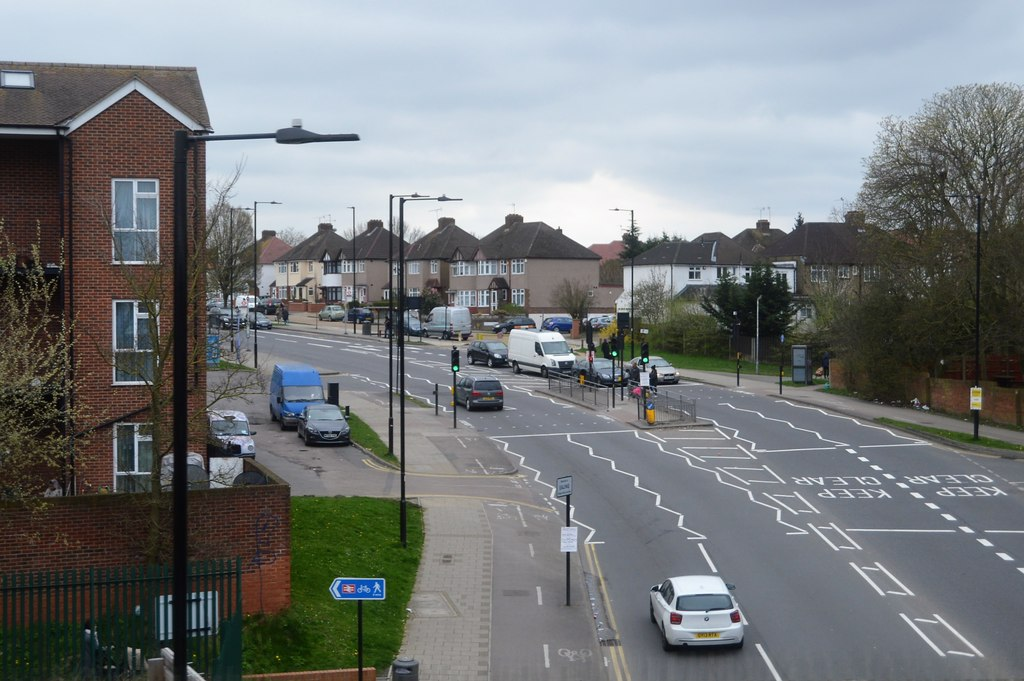
A312 Petts Hill, in Northolt

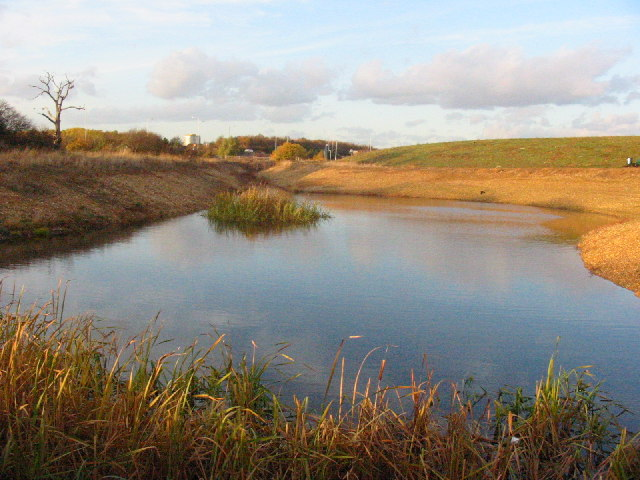
Minet Country Park just off The Parkway in Hayes

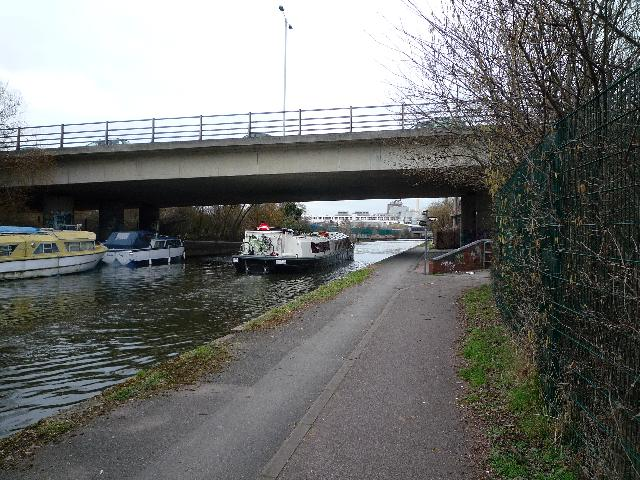
The Parkway bridge running over the Grand Union Canal near Hayes

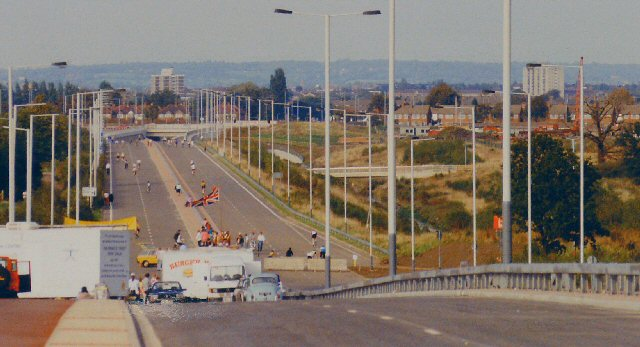
The Hayes Bypass shortly before its opening in 1992, when the completed road was in use for the Hillingdon Cycle Circuit

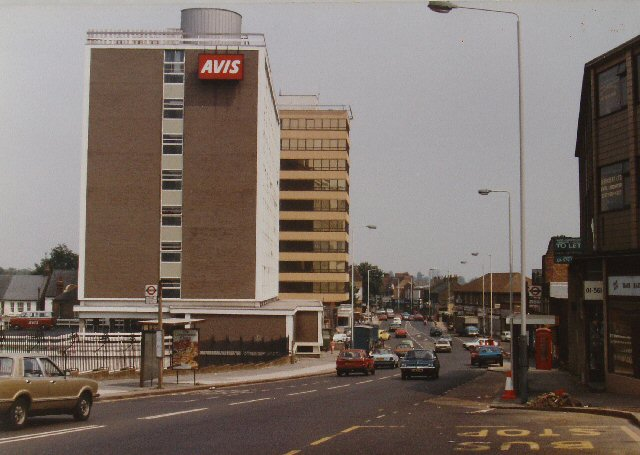
The A312 running through Hayes town centre in 1981, before the creation of the bypass to the east

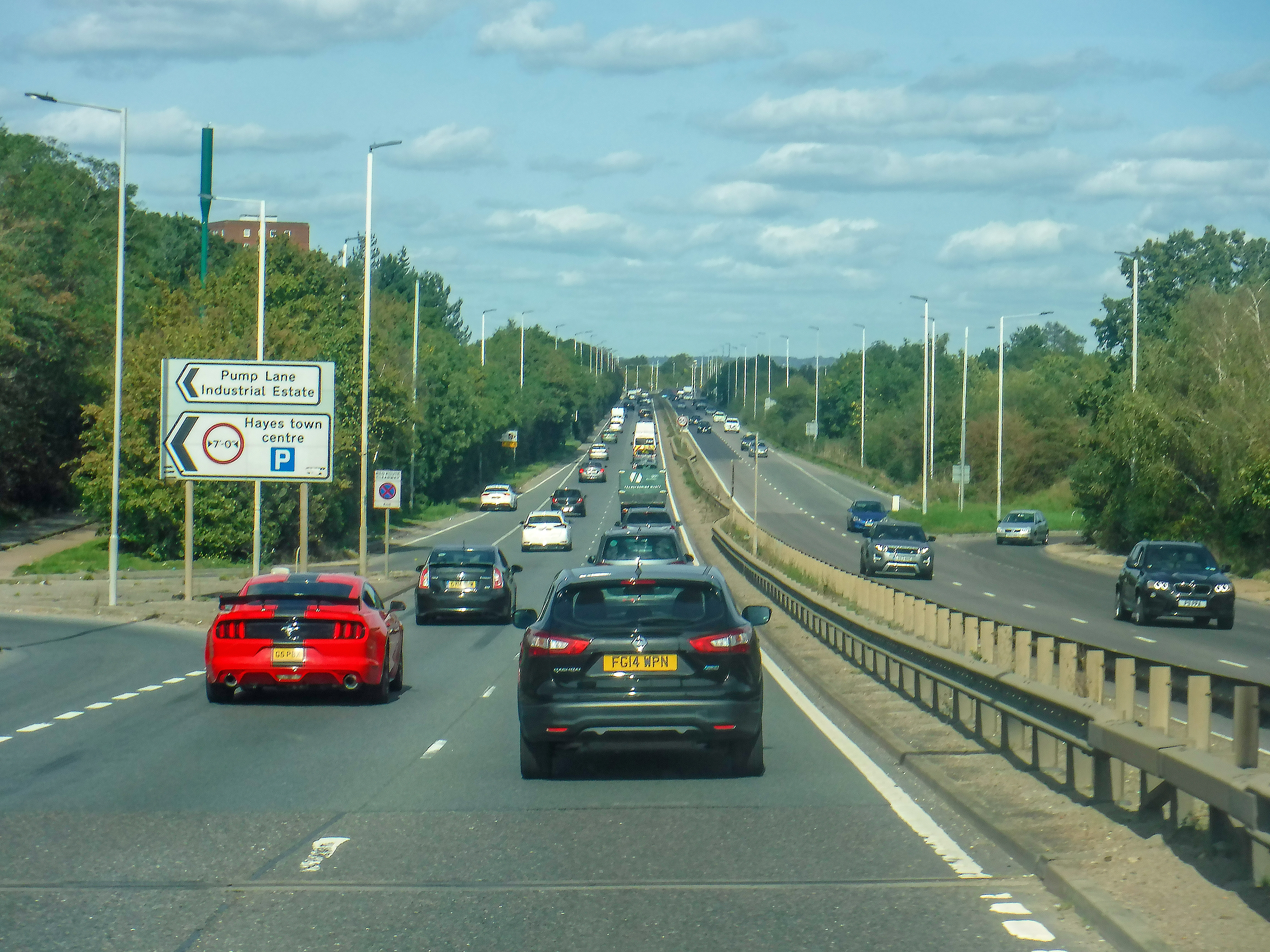
View of The Parkway in Hayes

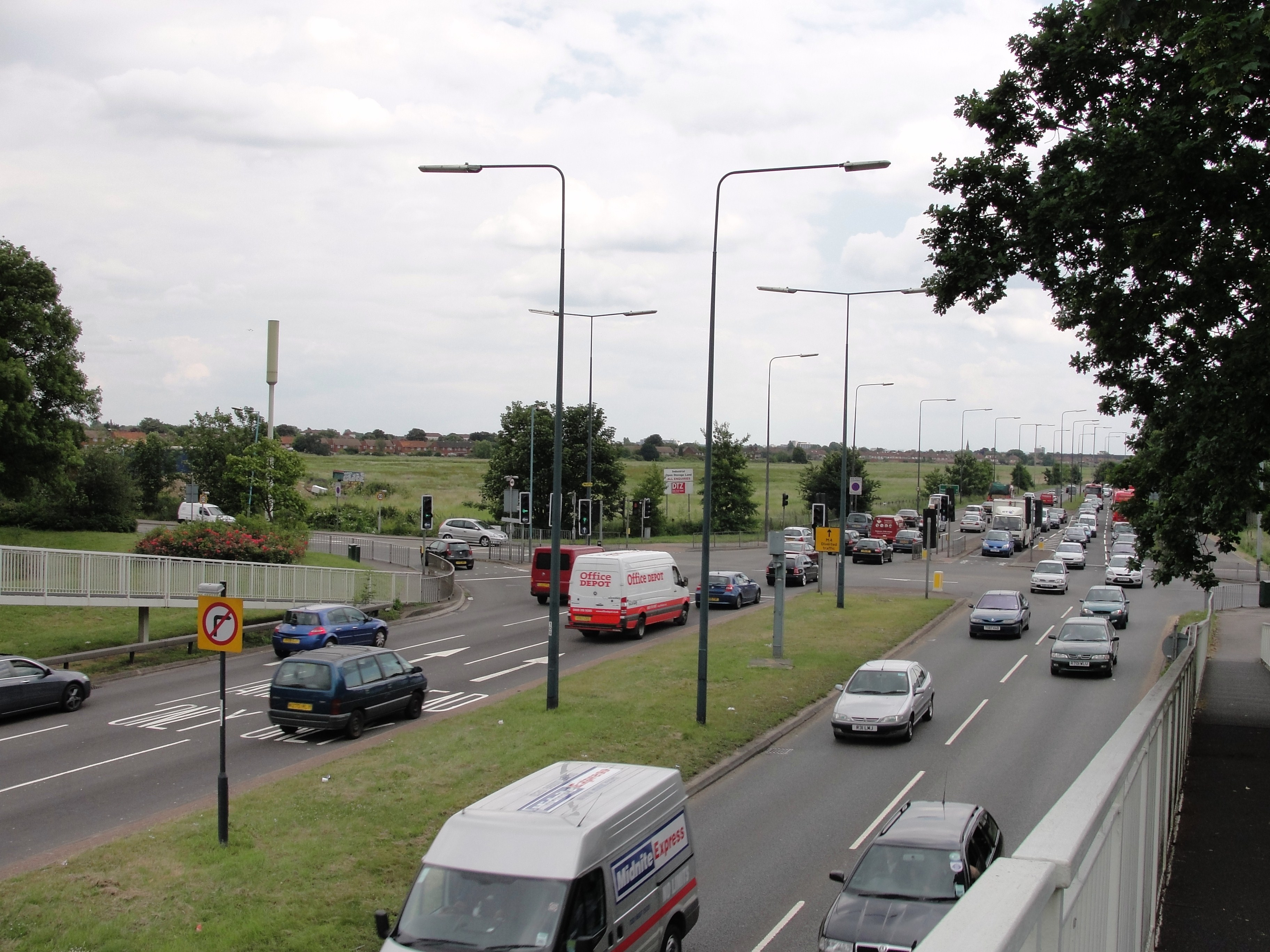
View of The Parkway near Cranford

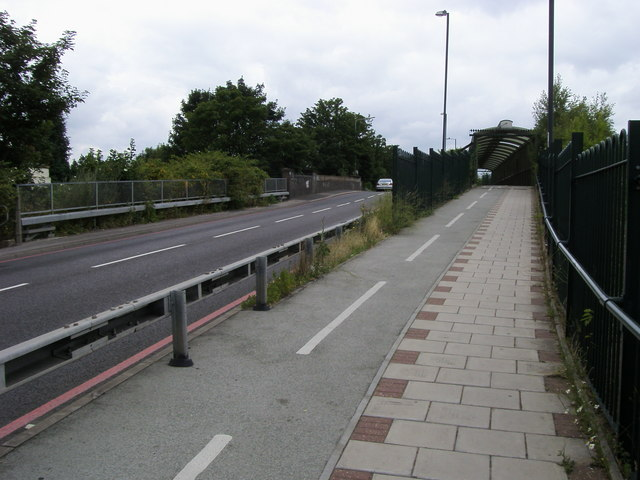
The A312 Harlington Road East and a walkway running over the Waterloo-Reading rail line near Feltham

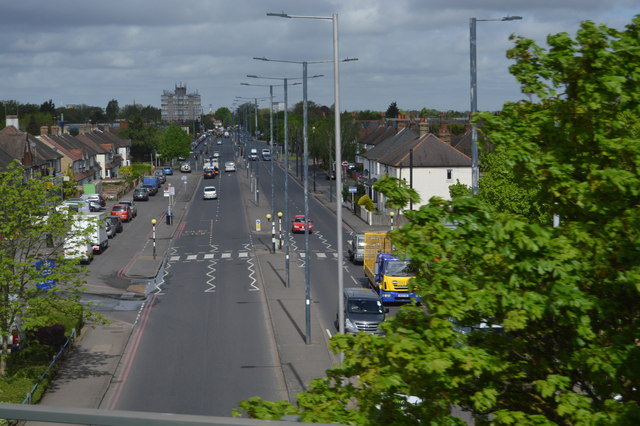
A312 Hampton Road West in Hanworth

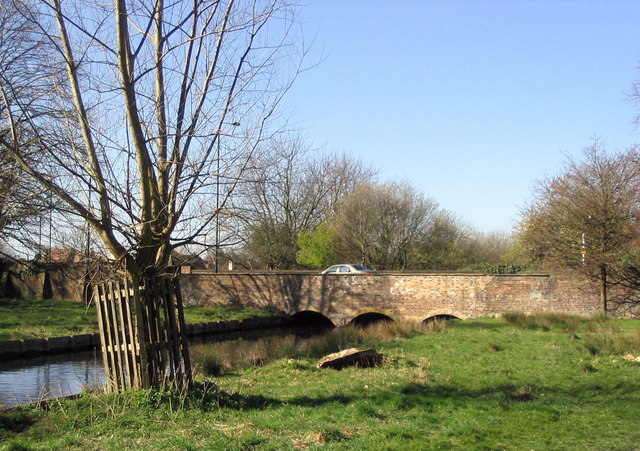
The Pantile Bridge crossing the Longford River, across the very southern end of the A312 in Hampton

== See also ==
- RAF Northolt
- Northala Fields
- Heston services
- Hanworth Air Park
