= West Kent Golf Course nature reserve =

Nature reserve in Greater London, England

Coordinates: 51.3297°N 0.0490°E

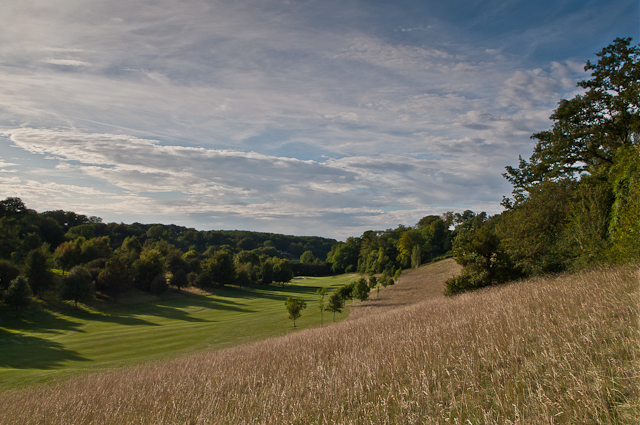

West Kent Golf Course is located in Downe in the London Borough of Bromley. Three areas totalling 9.2 hectares within the golf course, owned by the golf club, are managed by the London Wildlife Trust (LWT) as a nature reserve. The site is close to Down House, the former home of Charles Darwin. It is part of Darwin's Landscape Laboratory, which was the UK's unsuccessful 2010 nomination as a World Heritage Site, and is (as of 2016) on the Tentative List of World Heritage Sites. The nature reserve is also part of the West Kent Golf Course and Down House Site of Metropolitan Importance for Nature Conservation.

According to the Trust, the most important part of the reserve is chalk grassland in a dry valley, and it "was crucial to Charles Darwin’s study of local wildlife that appeared in The Origin of Species and his later botanical books especially his study of orchids." It has a number of scarce orchids, including the nationally rare man orchid. Other wild flowers include wild thyme and yellow rattle, and over 28 species of butterfly have been recorded, such as the increasingly scarce small blue.

A public footpath from Milking Lane in Orpington crosses the site.
