= The Warren, Bromley =

Nature reserve in St Mary Cray, London, England

Coordinates: 51.3929°N 0.1352°E

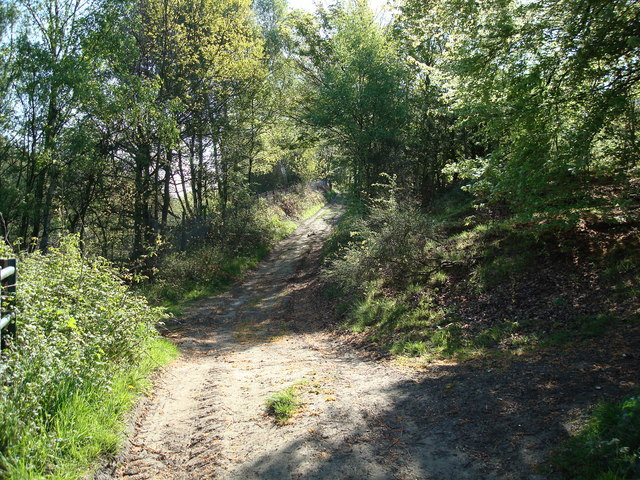

The Warren is a 13.5-hectare (33-acre) nature reserve in St Mary Cray in the London Borough of Bromley. It is a Site of Borough Importance for Nature Conservation, Grade I, and is managed by the London Wildlife Trust.

The site is mainly ancient oak and silver birch woodland with a ground flora of bracken, foxgloves and bluebells. The wood is open, with grass clearings, and there is a pond which has rare London plants such as blue fleabane and hare's-foot clover. Birds include green woodpeckers and nuthatches, and there are many bees and butterflies.

There is access from Sheepcote Lane.
