= Dews Farm Sand Pits =

Nature reserve in West London, England

Coordinates: 51.584°N 0.4736°W

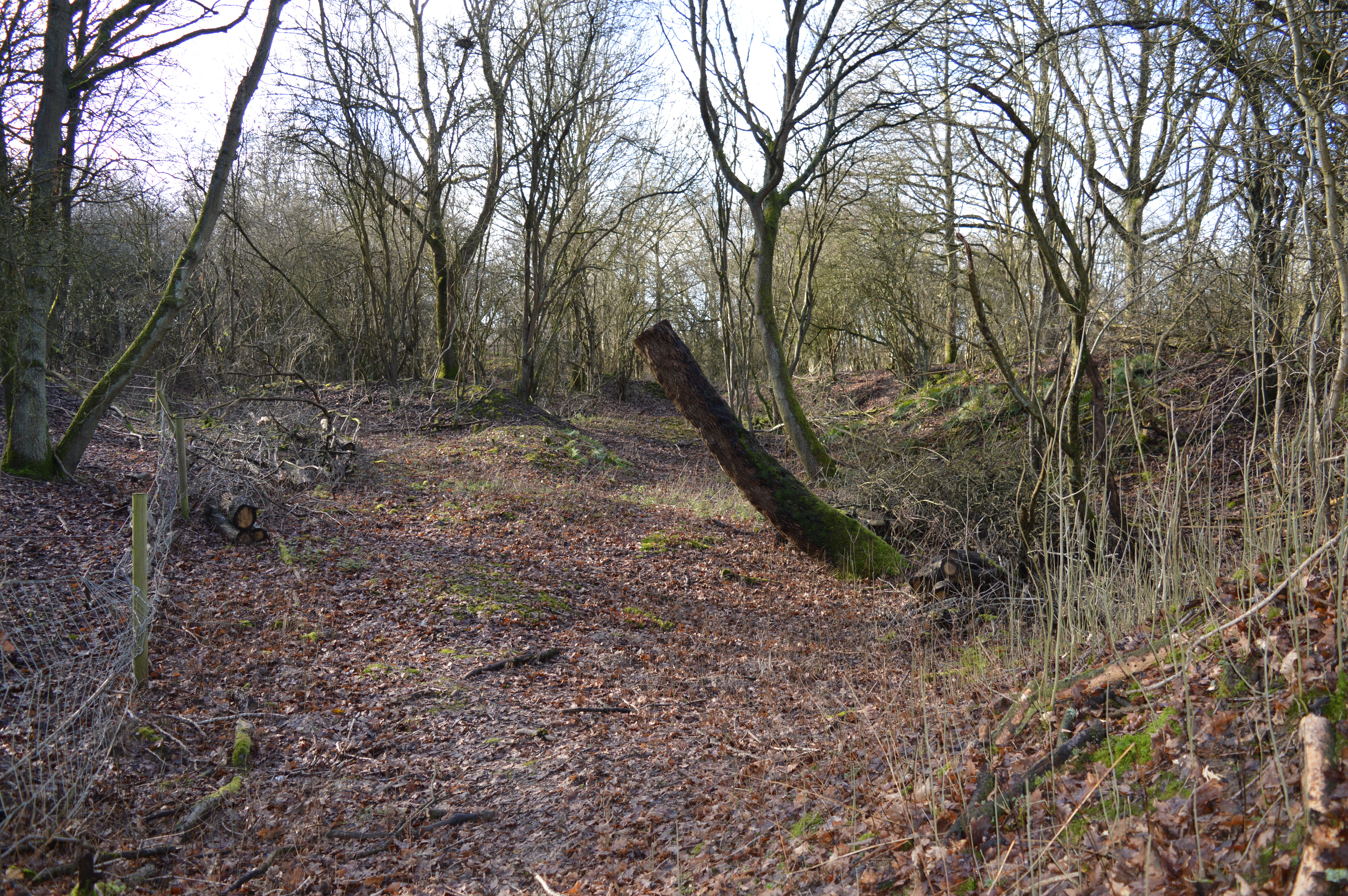

Dews Farm Sand Pits is a 1.2-hectare (3.0-acre) nature reserve near Harefield in the London Borough of Hillingdon. It is managed by the London Wildlife Trust, and is a Site of Borough Importance for Nature Conservation, Grade I.

The site is an old quarry which has been reclaimed by nature. It has areas of woodland, dominated by pedunculate oak and ash. In drier grassland areas, there is common knapweed, agrimony and ox-eye daisy.

There is access from Harvil Road near Newyears Green Lane.
