= Bramley Bank =

Nature reserve in Croydon, England

Coordinates: 51.354°N 0.058°W

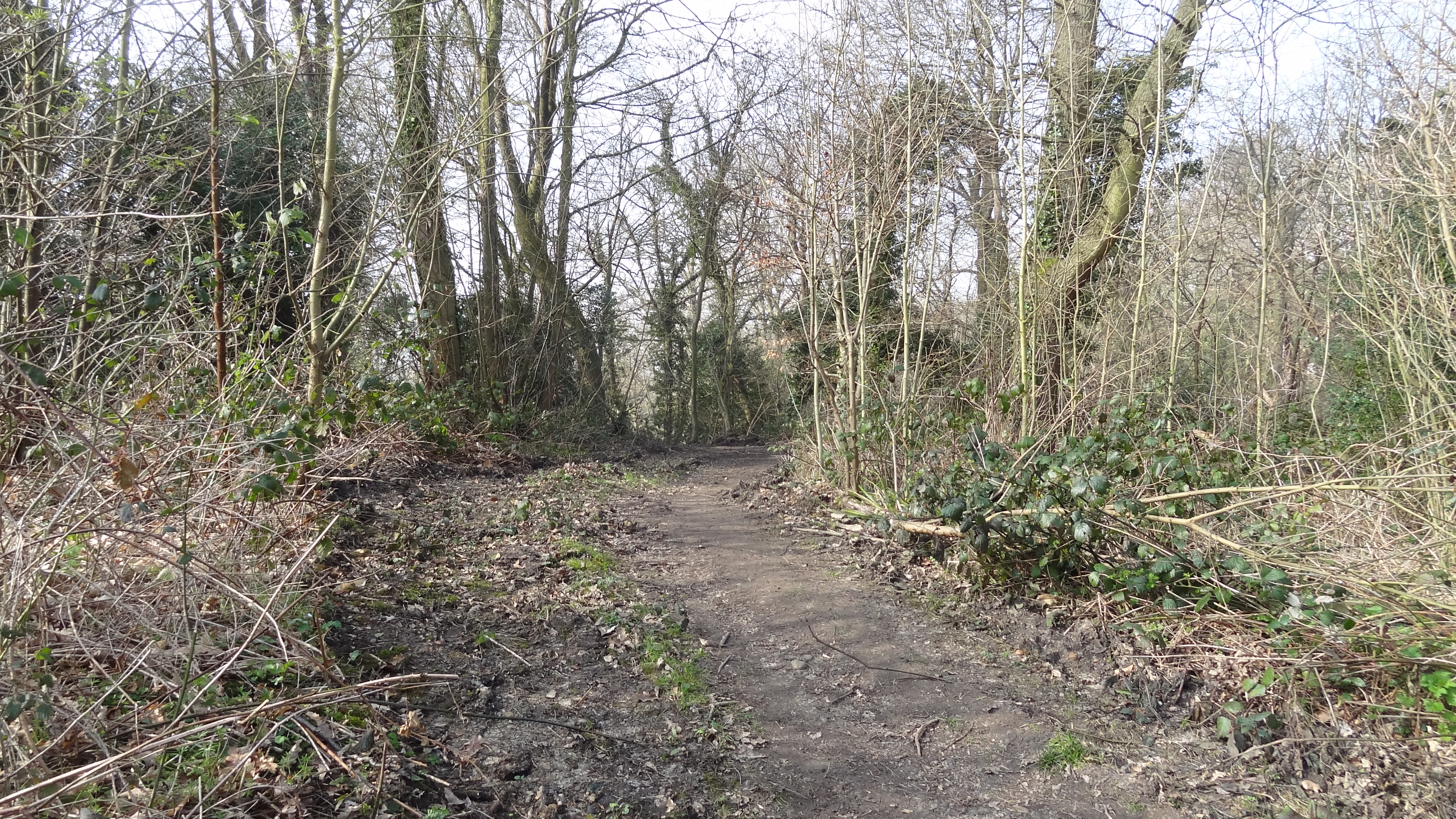
Path in Bramley Bank

Bramley Bank is a 10.3 hectare local nature reserve in Upper Shirley in the London Borough of Croydon. It is owned by Croydon Council and managed by London Wildlife Trust.

The site has acid grassland, woodland and a pond. Flowers include common violets and enchanter's nightshade, and there are displays of bluebells in the spring. The woodland is mainly oak, ash and sycamore. The margin of the pond has yellow flag and flote grass. Wildlife includes nuthatches, song thrushes, purple hairstreak butterflies, yellow meadow ants and pipistrelle bats.

There is access from Riesco Drive and Broadcombe.
