= Westerley Cycling Club =

Club based in Ealing, West London

- Founded: 1924
- President: Keith Shorten
- Members: 150
- Website: www.westerley.cc

The Westerley Cycling Club is based in Ealing, West London. It was founded in 1924, and has played a prominent role in the development of time trialling in the United Kingdom.

== History ==
=== Early ===
'The Westerley' as it is known today was originally formed as a racing subset of the Western Section of the CTC (Cyclists' Touring Club), now the Ealing section of the West London DA. This was intended to allow members of that CTC section to form a racing club without ultimately disentangling themselves from the then hugely popular CTC.

The "Western Wheelers" was therefore formed for the use of regular riding male members of the local CTC section. Women were admitted in 1927, by which point it had emerged that there was already a club named "Western Wheelers", and so the name "Western Elite" was briefly adopted, eventually becoming the "Westerley Road Club". The close connections to the CTC can still be seen in the club logo, which is clearly influenced by the CTC logo comprising a bicycle wheel with concentric star of three wings. The colours - purple, white and black - are those of the founding CTC section.

1925 was the first fully active year for the Westerley Road Club, which, led by its president Will Townsend OBE (d.2007), promoted a programme of time trials. These consisted of the standard distances; 10, 25, 50 and 100 miles, as well as a 12-hour event and a hill climb.

The Second World War brought several casualties for the club, although it survived and returned to its previous strength during the late 1940s and early 1950s.

Members of the Westerley have, during the 20th Century, enjoyed considerable success in many types of racing, in particular tricycling and RRA (Road Records Association) records.

=== Modern ===
In 2003, the name "Westerley Road Club" was updated to the "Westerley Cycling Club". This change denoted a response to the dwindling profile of traditional time trialling clubs in the UK. The Westerley now promotes a set of spring criterium races at the Hillingdon Cycle Circuit in West London, in addition to a reduced time trial programme.

The Westerley Cycling Club is affiliated to British Cycling and Cycling Time Trials.

Westerley also organise annual Audax events from Ruislip.
