= Minet Country Park =

Park in Hillingdon, London

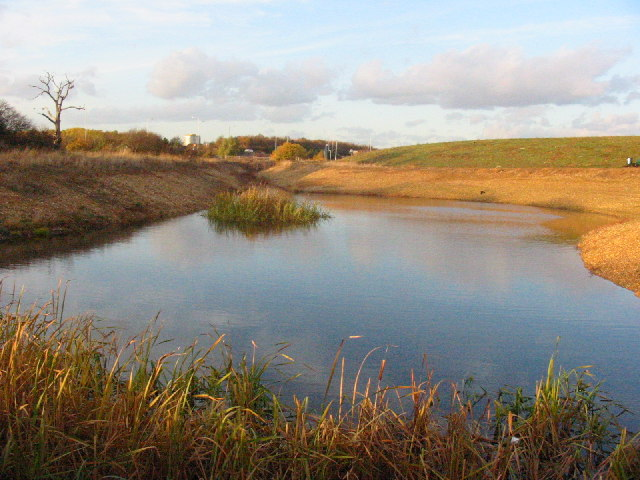
- Pond in the park
- Interactive map of Minet Country Park
- Type: Public park
- Location: Hayes, Hillingdon, Greater London
- Coordinates: 51°30′33″N 0°24′8″W
- Created: 2003
- Operator: London Borough of Hillingdon
- Status: Open year round

Minet Country Park is a 36-hectare park on Springfield Road, Hayes in the London Borough of Hillingdon; it is situated between the A312 (Hayes by-pass) and the Uxbridge Road.

== History ==
Awarded a Green Flag for the first time in 2009, Minet Country Park was opened to the public in 2003. The park was originally part of the Coldharbour Estate, owned by the Minet family from 1766 to the mid-twentieth century.

== Flora and fauna ==
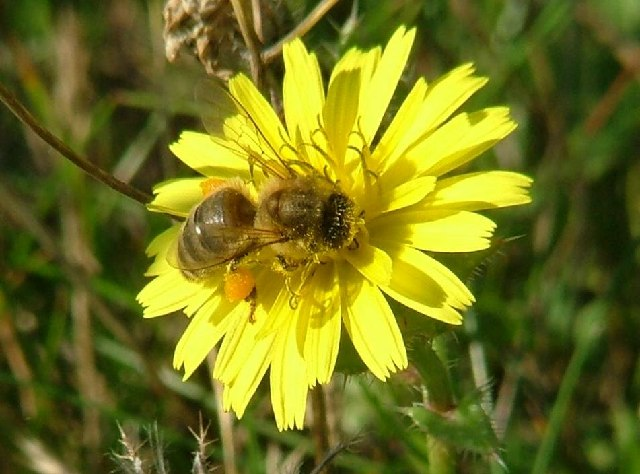
Honey bee on bristly oxtongue at Minet Country Park

The country park is a mosaic of habitats, connected by a network of hedges, waterways and grassland corridors, which are home to numerous species of wild plants, birds and insects. It is part of the 'Yeading Brook, Minet CP and Hith' Site of Borough Importance for Nature Conservation, Grade I.

== Facilities and features ==
On site is a children's play area, meadows, and hedgerows with ponds and mature oaks. There are picnic areas with tables, a network of footpaths, benches and a car park.

Hillingdon Cycle Circuit is part of Minet Country Park and can be used free of charge by the public.

All pedestrian entrances have wheelchair- and pushchair-friendly gates.

== Transport ==
=== Bus ===
There are bus-stops (427) at the north-end of Minet Country Park.

=== Train ===
The closest train station is Hayes and Harlington.

== Management ==
Minet Country Park is owned by Hillingdon Borough Council, and managed in partnership with A Rocha Living Waterways. All events and activities are listed on the borough website.
