= Spencer Road Wetlands =

Nature reserve in Mitcham, London, England

Coordinates: 51.3847°N 0.1626°W

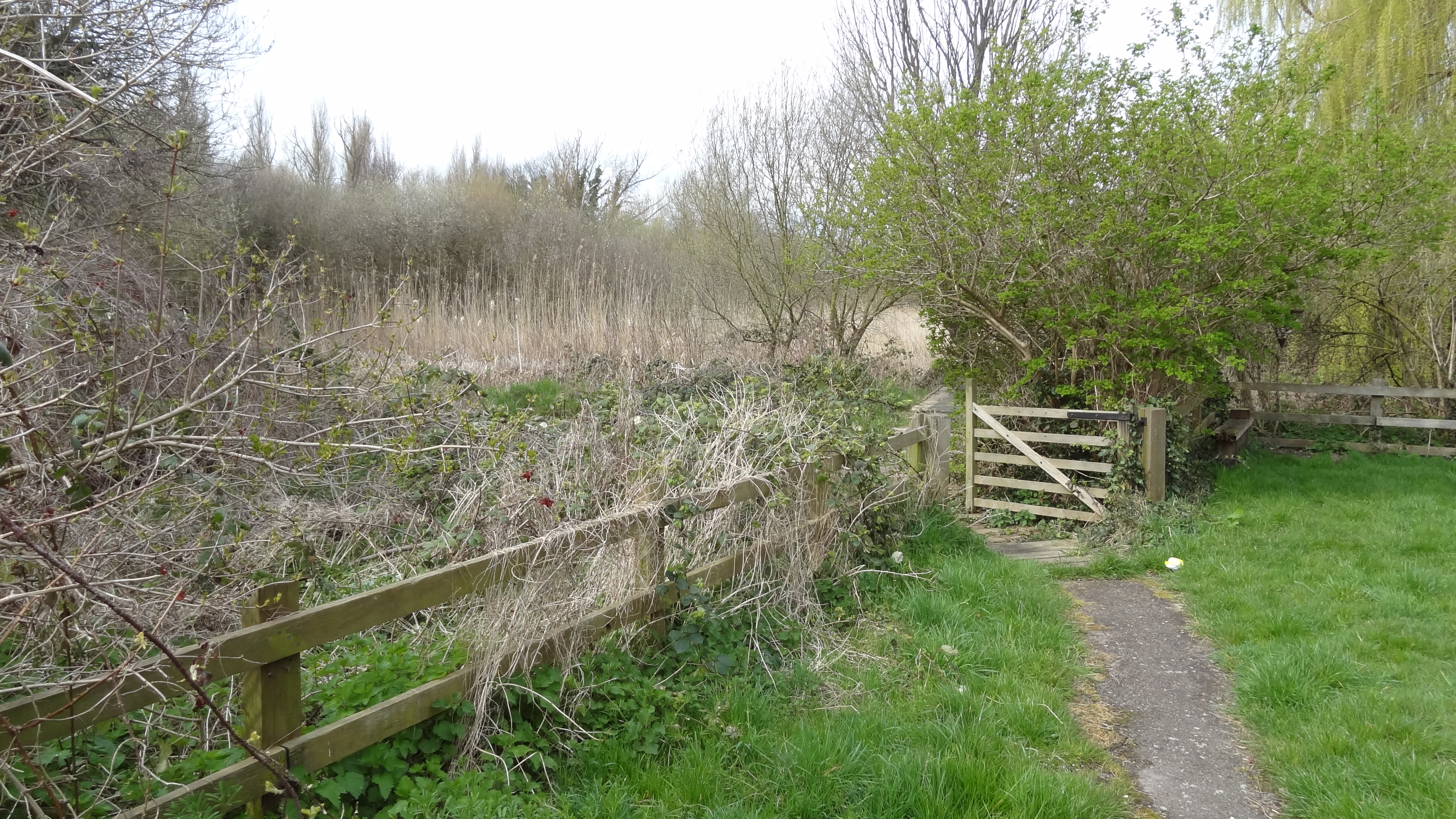
The entrance to Spencer Road Wetlands

Spencer Road Wetlands is a one hectare Local Nature Reserve in Mitcham in the London Borough of Sutton. It is owned by Sutton Council and managed by the London Wildlife Trust.

From about 1895 to 1959 the site was subject to controlled flooding for watercress production. It was left then unmanaged, and colonised by willow woodland, until the late 1980s, and in 1991 the London Wildlife Trust took over the management. The site has reed swamps with wetland vegetation, woodland, a sedge-bed and a pond. Insects include the twin-spotted wainscot and crescent moths, and there are birds such as grey heron, Eurasian reed warbler and kingfisher.

The entrance at the corner of Spencer Road and Wood Street is kept locked and public access is limited to monthly open days, normally on the first Saturday of each month.
