= London Wildlife Trust =

English nature conservation charity

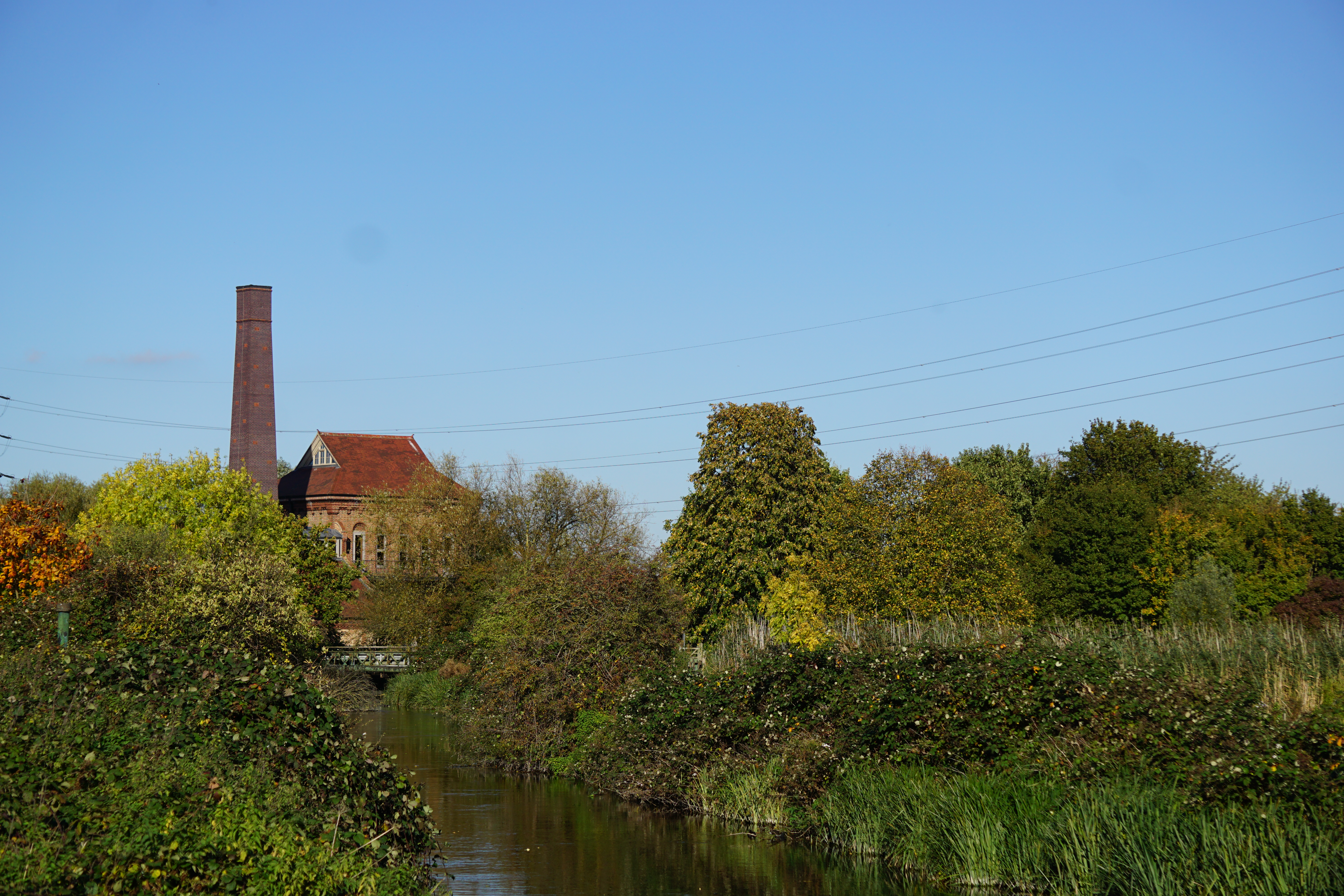
- View of the Engine House building at London Wildlife Trust's Walthamstow Wetlands Nature Reserve
- Formation: 1981
- Type: Charitable organization
- Purpose: Nature recovery
- Headquarters: Fivefields, 8-10 Grosvenor Gardens, Victoria, London, SW1W 0DH
- CEO: David Mooney
- Chair: Rufus Radcliffe
- Key people: Sam Davenport (Director of Nature Recovery), Mathew Frith (Director of Research), Charlie Sims (Director of Visitor Experience)
- Staff: 50+
- Volunteers: 700+
- Website: https://www.wildlondon.org.uk

London Wildlife Trust is an English wildlife charity based in London.

Founded in 1981, London Wildlife Trust is one of 46 members of the Royal Society of Wildlife Trusts (known as The Wildlife Trusts), each of which is a local nature charity for its area. The Trust manages 36 nature reserves in Greater London and provides education services for schools, events for nature enthusiasts, and information on how to help London's wildlife.

The Trust pioneered the systematic recording of data on wildlife and the environment in the capital. Its "Biological Recording Project" became the semi-independent "Greenspace Information for Greater London", known as GIGL.

The Trust has more than 50 members of staff and 700 volunteers, and is supported by over 12,000 members. Its reserves receive over 1 million visits per year.

In its 2024 strategy document the Trust sets out its vision and mission, as well as plans for a five-year period. The trust states its vision is to be "a London alive with wildlife, nature in everyone's neighbourhood."

== Nature reserves ==
=== Sites ===
| Site | Location (Note: The location and public access are taken from the London Wildlife Trust page for each site.) | Public access | Description |
|---|---|---|---|
| Birdbrook Road Nature Reserve | Kidbrooke | No | A reserve in Kidbrooke and one of London's most important strongholds for newts. |
| Braeburn Park | Crayford | Yes | A former orchard, quarry and landfill site reclaimed by nature and now managed in partnership with the Land Trust. |
| Bramley Bank | Croydon | Yes | Restored woodland and heathland in Croydon which typifies London's semi-natural habitats, providing a home for stag beetles and woodpeckers. |
| Camley Street Natural Park | King's Cross | Yes | Camley Street Natural Park is in central London – between King's Cross and St Pancras. |
| Centre for Wildlife Gardening | East Dulwich | Yes | Wildlife garden and visitor centre in a residential street in East Dulwich. |
| Chapel Bank | Croydon | Yes | A chalk grassland reserve with butterflies. |
| Crane Park Island | Whitton | Yes | A variety of habitats including woodland, reedbed, ditches, ponds and river. On a site formerly used for gunpowder production in Whitton. |
| Denham Lock Wood | Hillingdon | Yes | An example of wet woodland in London, designated as a Site of Special Scientific Interest (SSSI) in the Colne Valley. |
| Dews Farm Sand Pits | Hillingdon | Yes | A combination of acid grassland and young woodland habitats in Harefield, Hillingdon. |
| Farm Bog | Wimbledon | Yes | One of the largest of London's six remaining lowland bogs on Wimbledon Common. |
| Frays Farm Meadows | Uxbridge | Yes | One of the rare wet grazing meadows in London and part-designated Site of Special Scientific Interest (SSSI), near Uxbridge, Hillingdon. |
| Frays Island and Mabey's Meadow | West Drayton | Yes | Alder and willow woodland set between the Rivers Colne and Frays in West Drayton. |
| Gunnersbury Triangle | Chiswick | Yes | A reserve framed by intersecting railway lines, close to Chiswick Park Station. |
| Gutteridge Wood and Meadows | Hillingdon | Yes | An ancient oak and hazel coppice woodland and adjacent associated meadows in North Hillingdon. The woodland has bluebells in spring and a year-long haven for birds and wildflowers. |
| Huckerby's Meadows (Note: This site is indexed by the London Wildlife Trust as Huckerby's Meadows, but the information page is headed Crane Meadows.) | Hillingdon | Yes | Wildlife reserve beneath the flight approach to Heathrow Airport. |
| Hutchinson's Bank | Croydon | Yes | An area of chalk grassland and woodland, supporting rare plants and insects. |
| Ickenham Marsh | Ickenham | Yes | An array of wetland plants dominate this riverside site. |
| Isleworth Ait | Isleworth | No | An sanctuary for birds, beetles and rare molluscs on an island in the middle of the River Thames. |
| New Cross Gate Cutting | Brockley | No | An area of woodland in South London set on the slopes of a deep railway cutting, which supports 170 species of flowering plants |
| Oak Hill Wood | Barnet | Yes | This steeply-sloping medieval woodland in East Barnet is home to bats, rare trees and flowers. |
| Park Road Pond | Hillingdon | Yes | A site with amphibians in Uxbridge. |
| Riddlesdown | Croydon | Yes | A chalk grassland and yew woodland in North Downs. |
| Saltbox Hill | Greater London | Yes | This rare fragment of surviving downland in Biggin Hill is said to have inspired a local man called Charles Darwin. |
| Spencer Road Wetlands | Beddington Corner | No | An area of wet willow woodland and reed swamp next to south London's River Wandle. |
| Sydenham Hill Wood and Cox's Walk | Sydenham Hill | Yes | A mix of new and ancient woodland in Dulwich, with remnants of Victorian gardens. The Trust's oldest nature reserve. |
| Ten Acre Wood and Meadows | Hillingdon | Yes | A century-old oak plantation over hazel coppice in Hillingdon. |
| The Grove | Hillingdon | Yes | A remnant of an old Victorian garden in Hillingdon, the site is aided by the presence of wetland areas. |
| The Warren | Kevington | Yes | This mixed woodland reserve close to the Cray Valley on London's Kent border was formerly part of the estate of a Georgian manor house. |
| Threecorner Grove | Croydon | Yes | A chalk woodland on London's southern extremity. |
| Totteridge Fields | Barnet | Yes | Traditional English countryside within London's northern fringe in Barnet. |
| Walthamstow Wetlands | Walthamstow | Yes | 15 minutes from central London. |
| West Kent Golf Course | Downe | Yes | In the rough grass, a natural habitat with butterflies and orchids. |
| Wilderness Island | Carshalton | Yes | Where two arms of the River Wandle meet in South London. |
| Woodberry Wetlands | Hackney | Yes | Woodberry Wetlands is in Hackney: 11 hectares of reed-fringed ponds and dykes. |
| Yeading Brook Meadows | Hillingdon | Yes | Wild flowers and grasses dominate this meadow in West London's Yeading Valley, hosting insect life. |

== See also ==
- List of Local Nature Reserves in Greater London
- List of Sites of Special Scientific Interest in Greater London

== Sources ==
- London Wildlife Trust (2015). For a Wilder City. London Wildlife Trust 2015–20. London Wildlife Trust.
- Frith, Mathew (2012). Sands, Tim (ed.). London. The Wildlife Trusts. pp. 388–397. ISBN 978-1-908739-49-0.
