= Ickenham Marsh =

Nature reserve in London, England

Coordinates: 51.5552°N 0.4335°W

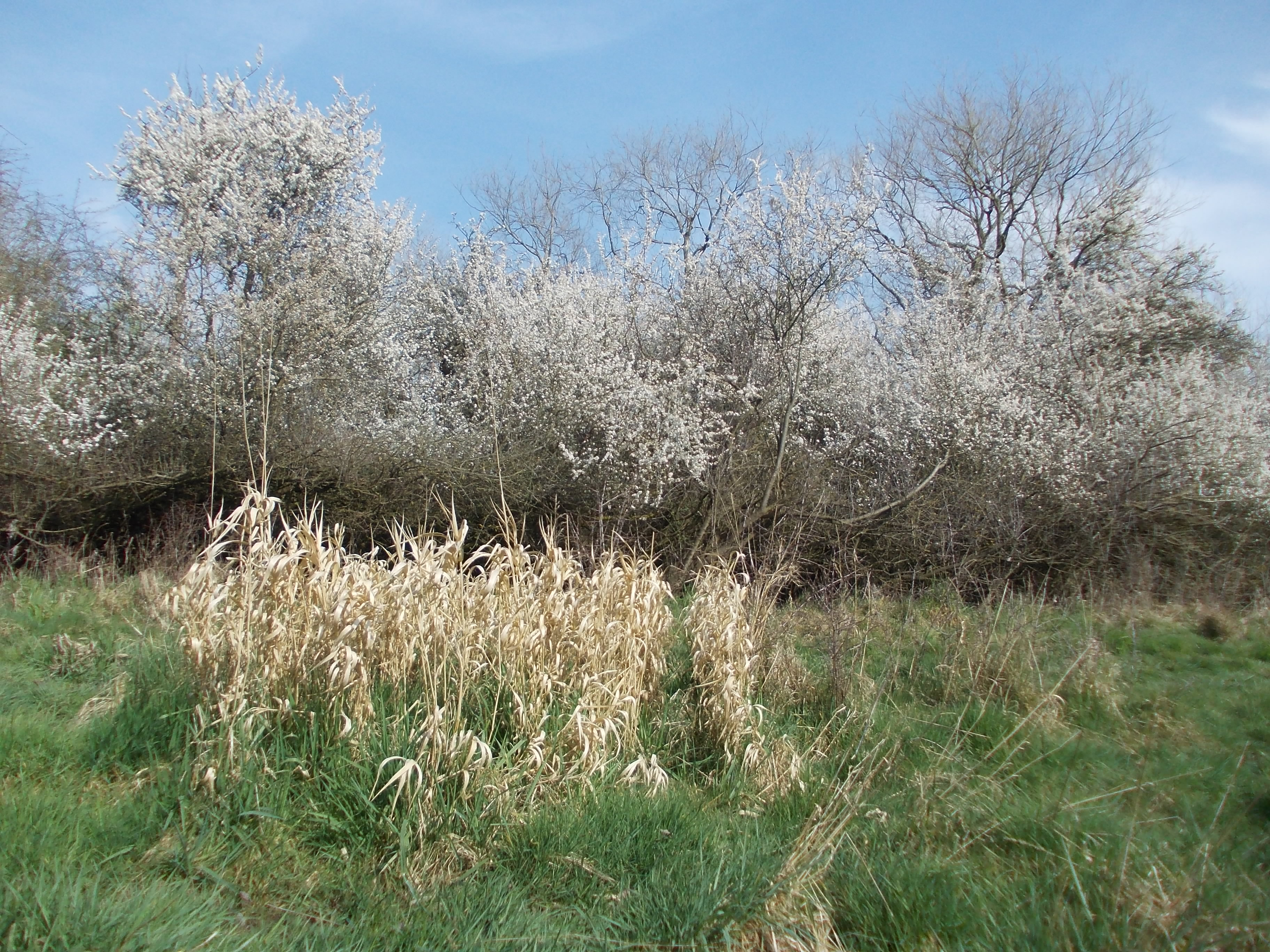
Blackthorn on Ickenham Marsh

Ickenham Marsh is an area of grassland and marsh in the London Borough of Hillingdon. It is managed as a nature reserve by London Wildlife Trust.
