= Yeading =

Area of West London, England

Coordinates: 51.5303°N 0.3916°W

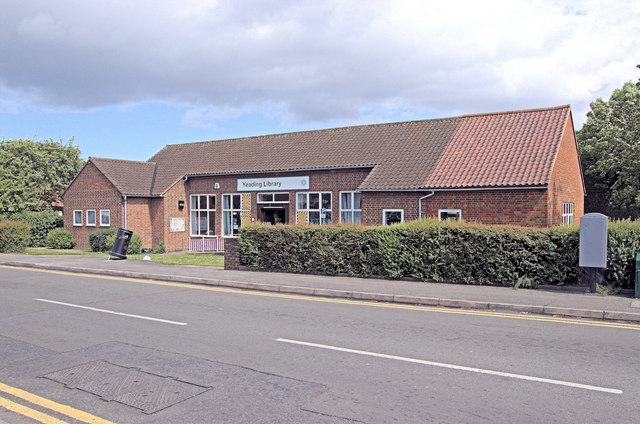
- Yeading Library

- Location within Greater London
- Population: 13,586 (2011 Census. Ward)
- OS grid reference: TQ115825
- London borough: Hillingdon
- Ceremonial county: Greater London
- Region: London
- Country: England
- Sovereign state: United Kingdom
- Post town: HAYES
- Postcode district: UB4
- Dialling code: 020
- Police: Metropolitan
- Fire: London
- Ambulance: London
- UK Parliament: Hayes and Harlington
- London Assembly: Ealing and Hillingdon

Yeading (/ˈjɛdɪŋ/ YED-ing) is a settlement in west London, forming part of the London Borough of Hillingdon, having been developed after the Second World War.

== Etymology ==
Yeading is very early Saxon and was originally Geddingas or Geddinges, meaning "the people of Geddi".

== History ==
The earliest surviving documented allusion to Yeading dates from 757 AD, in which year Æthelbald of Mercia made a land grant which mentioned Geddinges (Yeading) and Fiscesburne (Crane or Yeading Brook). The first land grant including Yeading was made by Offa in 790 to Æthelhard, Archbishop of Canterbury: "in the place called on linga Haese [Hayes] and Geddinges [Yeading] around the stream called Fiscesburna [Crane or Yeading Brook]."

Anglo-Saxon settlement in Yeading therefore seems probable, but the history of Yeading in subsequent centuries is not as clear as that of Hayes. Details including the names of many Yeading manor holders remain unknown.

Yeading Dock was one of many canal docks built along the Grand Union Canal in the 19th and early 20th centuries. The main industry in Hayes and Yeading at this time was brickmaking, and the canal provided a reliable way of transporting large numbers of bricks. Yeading's brickworkers were known to keep pigs as a second source of income. A bourgeois writer, Elizabeth Hunt, wrote in 1861 that in "Yeading dirt, ignorance and darkness reign supreme." In 1874, however, James Thorne wrote that the inhabitants of Yeading were "always found civil".

Yeading was still not developed in the 1920s. Yeading Lane was often flooded, and access beyond Yeading to Northolt seems to have been by footpath only before the First World War. During the War, a properly constructed road was built linking the Great Western Railway station at Hayes with the L.N.E.R. line at Northolt. Yeading was still mainly a rural area.

After the Second World War, a large prefab estate was erected in Yeading. By 1956, Yeading's Tilbury Square was still without gas and electricity, and oil stoves and open fires were still used; the public house The Willow Tree, reputedly some 400 years old (demolished in 2009), was lit by three cylinders of calor gas. The Yeading Lane estate underwent largescale development in the late 1960s and 1970s.

== Politics ==
Yeading is part of the Hayes and Harlington constituency for elections to the House of Commons of the United Kingdom.

Yeading is part of the Yeading ward for elections to Hillingdon London Borough Council.

== Education ==
Schools in Yeading include:

- Barnhill Community High School
- Yeading Infant and Nursery School
- Yeading Junior School
- Brookside Primary School
- Belmore Primary School

== Demographics ==
The largest ethnic group in the Hillingdon ward of Yeading in the 2011 Census was White British with 28.3%. This was followed by Indians (20.3%), Other Asians (11.5%) and Black Africans (8.1%).

56.3% of people living in Yeading were born in England according to the 2011 census. Other popular places of birth included India (10.6%), Sri Lanka (3.2%), Pakistan (2.8%) and Somalia (2.6%).

The most popular religious affiliation in Yeading is Christianity at 37.1%. Other common religious include Islam (18.3%), Sikhism (14.1%), Hinduism (11.8%), and those of no religion (11.3%).

== Transport and locale ==
=== Buses ===
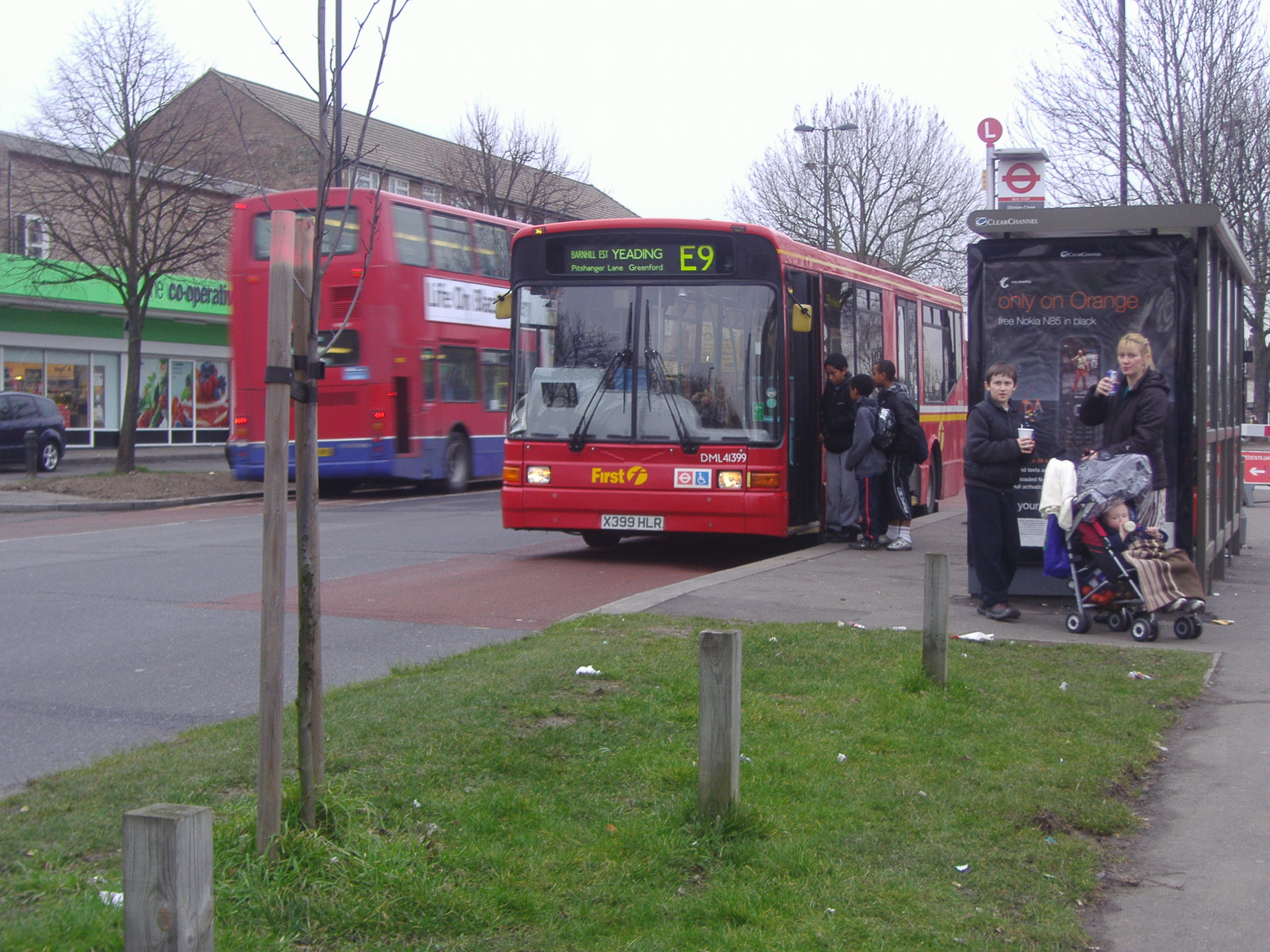
A local bus on Yeading Lane

Yeading has the following bus routes travelling through it: 90, 120, 140, 282, 696, 697, E6, E9, SL8, and N7, N140.

=== Library ===
Yeading Library, Yeading Lane, UB4 0EW.

=== Churches ===
- St Edmund of Canterbury, 12 Edmunds Close, UB4 0HA.
- St Nicholas,106 Raynton Drive, UB4 8BG.
- St Raphael Catholic Church, Morrison Road, UB4 9JP
- Grange Park Baptists, 217 Lansbury Drive, UB4 8RS.

== Sport and recreation ==
Football team Hayes & Yeading United F.C. was assembled from the former Hayes F.C. and Yeading F.C.

There are three Local Nature Reserves, Yeading Brook Meadows, Ten Acre Wood and Gutteridge Wood and Meadows.

A community radio station, 91.8 Hayes FM, serves Yeading.

== Nearest places ==
- Hayes
- Ealing
- Greenford
- Hanwell
- Harrow
- Northolt
- Southall
- Sudbury
