= Betteshanger Park =

Park in Kent, England

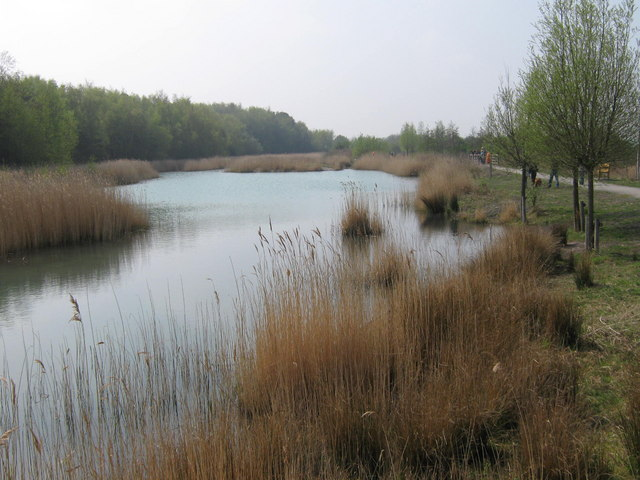
- Fowlmead Lake in Betteshanger Park
- Interactive map of Betteshanger Park
- Coordinates: 51°14′12″N 1°22′06″E
- Area: 250 acres (1,000,000 m^{2})
- Created: 2007
- Operator: Quinn Estates
- Status: Open 7 days a week
- Website: www.betteshanger-park.co.uk

Betteshanger Country Park shown within Kent (grid reference TR35285399)

Betteshanger Park (formerly Fowlmead Country Park and Betteshanger Country Park) is a park near Deal, in Kent, England. It covers the site of a former colliery spoil tip.

== History ==
This 365-acre (1,480,000 m^{2}) park is situated on the site of a former spoil tip of the former Betteshanger Colliery, one of the largest collieries in Kent. The colliery opened in 1924–30 and closed in 1989. The spoil tip was located to the north east of the former colliery.

The original area (before the spoil tip) was known as Foulmead Marsh and the community (with help from Dover District Council) chose the name of the new park to be Fowlmead (Fowl – "bird", Mead - "meadow"). In May 2015, it was announced that the Hadlow Group had acquired Fowlmead and would be rebranding the park as Betteshanger Country Park, as part of the wider Betteshanger Sustainable Parks regeneration program. As of 2017 the organisation's website gives the name of the park as Betteshanger Park.

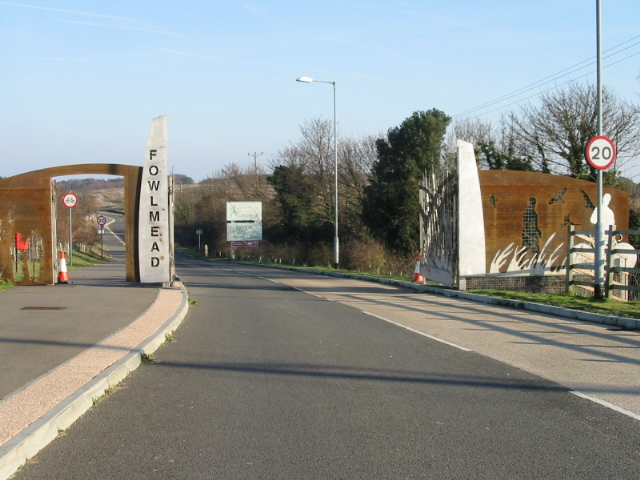
Entrance to Betteshanger

Fowlmead Country Park and Nature Reserve was initially developed under the management of the South East England Development Agency (SEEDA) with £18.8 million funding from English Partnerships, as part of the National Coalfields Programme (NCP). It was opened in May 2007 by Sir David Bellamy, in association with Sport England. Before then, however, (around 1960) Kent County Council was involved in planting the older parts of the spoil tip with non-native evergreen trees including Holm Oak which formed a woodland over areas of loose tipped spoil. In 1990 the tip was surveyed as part of the Kent Wildlife Habitat Survey and from 2001 on, Dover District Council oversaw the Environmental Impact Assessment carried out for SEEDA which led to a Council decision (unfulfilled) to declare the site a Local Nature Reserve.

The existing visitor centre was part-funded by SEEDA and Sport England. The surface material of a portion of the park (shale from the colliery) had mixed with recycled green waste and fertiliser to create a topsoil and 130,000 shrubs and trees were planted. The remainder was destined for natural colonization.

Hadlow Group went into educational administration in 2019, and the Park was then acquired by Quinn Estates. The housing and social building developers also have planning consent for considerable changes to the park and as late as January 2026 have closed the pedestrian access from North Deal. Quinn Estates helped finish the delayed construction works, including the Kent Mining Museum and Visitor Centre. The museum which was constructed in partnership with the Kent Mining Heritage Foundation (KMHF), cost £1.7 million to construct and is dedicated to Kent's mining heritage. It opened in April 2022. It is part of the newly built visitor centre which cost £6m to construct.

== Wildlife ==
There is already an abundance of wildlife (including short-eared owl, marsh harrier, kingfisher and various species of dragonflies), which can be seen within the park's developing natural habitat (beyond the cyclists' middle section), including a lake.

Summary of the Biodiversity Interest.

1. The second most important colony of Lizard Orchids in the Country
2. Significant numbers of rare invertebrates including the endangered Fiery Clearwing moth
3. Exceptional population of Common Lizards plus Grass Snakes and Slowworms
4. At least 7 species of Bat
5. Beavers and Badgers
6. Water Voles – an endangered species
7. Turtle Doves the UK’s fastest declining bird located in 5 different sites on the edge of the Park
8. Red listed birds including Skylark, Linnet, Cuckoo, Yellow Hammer, Starling, Mistle Thrush, Turtle Dove
9. Over 130 fungi species, several of which are rare

Further details on Species. Plants. Over 330 native plant species have been recorded at Betteshanger Country Park including 20 on the Kent Rare Plant Register. This includes the second most important colony of Lizard Orchids in the UK. Protected under schedule 8 of the Wildlife and Countryside Act Lizard orchids are a rare species in the UK and are listed as Near threatened on the Red Data list. See plan 6535/EC04-W Update Ecological Appraisal Seahive Jan 2023 for Locations and numbers of Lizard Orchids at the Park. Invertebrates. Over 20 species of invertebrate with a conservation designation have been recorded at the Park in surveys carried out by Aspect Ecology.10 In addition the Norfolk Hawker dragon fly has been recorded and three rare moth species have been identified:

- The Bright Wave moth Listed as Rare under the GB Red list (based on pre 1994 guidelines) and Endangered under the Kent Red Data Book (Kent RDB1)11.
- The Fiery Clearwing moth. Only found in Kent. (protected under schedule 5 of the Wildlife and Countryside Act) Very Rare and Endangered. (UK Moths)11
- The Sussex Emerald. Photographed at Betteshanger Country Park and recorded on irecord. (Protected under schedule 5 of the Wildlife and Countryside Act. Confined as a breeding species to a small area of south east England. A red Data book species)12.

Reptiles Betteshanger Country Park is an exceptional site for Common Lizards according to criteria in Froglife’s Reptile Advice Sheet no.10. In 2016 over 1,300 Common Lizards were moved from the Discovery Park in Sandwich to Betteshanger for their long term protection.(see planning application 14/00058.Condition 55) Protected under the Wildlife and Countryside Act 1981 and a priority species in the Kent Biodiversity Strategy 2020-2045) Grass snakes and Slowworms are also present. (Protected under the Wildlife and Countryside Act. Grass snakes are also a priority species in the Kent Biodiversity Strategy.) This makes the site a Key Reptile Site and it should be included in the Key Reptile Site Register which is designed to promote and safeguard important Reptile sites. Amphibians. Common Toads and smooth newts have also been recorded by local naturalists. Protected under the Wildlife and Countryside Act 1981. Mammals. Water Voles. Evidence recorded by Aspect Ecology on the proposed hotel site. Water Vole are an endangered species having disappeared from 94% of their previous habitats13. Protected under the Wildlife and Countryside Act and a target species in the Kent Biodiversity Strategy 2020-2045. Beavers. Evidence shows Beavers are present in the Park. (Recorded by local naturalists and Aspect Ecology) They are a European Protected species. No survey has been carried out to determine how significant the Beaver population is. Badgers. Badgers have been recorded at the Park by Aspect Ecology. Badgers are protected by the Badger Act. Bats. At least 7 species of Bat have been recorded by Aspect Ecology at Betteshanger Country Park in good numbers. All are European protected species. Birds. Turtle Doves have been recorded by Aspect Ecology at 5 locations on the edge of the Park. Turtle Doves are the UK’s fastest declining bird species and are vulnerable to extinction their numbers having dropped by 98%.7 Other Red Listed species include: Skylark, Linnet, Yellow Hammer, Mistle Thrush, Cuckoo, Starling Fungi. Over 130 species of fungi have been recorded at Betteshanger Country Park by local enthusiasts.These include rare species such as Pterula Multifida (Coral Pterulaceae) and Barometer Earthstar (Astraeus hygrometricus) Bloody Milkcap (Lactarius sangilfluus) Toads Ear (Otidea bufonia) and Weeping Bolete (Suillus granulatus)

Priority Habitats at the Park include Reedbeds and Open Mosaic Habitat on Previously developed land. This is a scarce habitat in the Dover District and supports Lizard Orchids and a wide range of other plants and invertebrates.. Other important habitats include ponds, scrub, hedgerows and trees.

== Activities ==
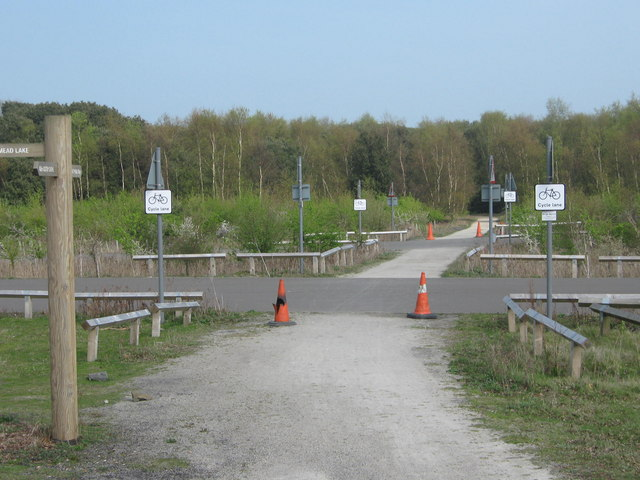
Cycle Paths and Footpaths

The park provides many activities including walking, cycling, fossil hunting, duathlon (running and cycling), orienteering and geocaching. Families can also enjoy the play area (close to the visitor centre and car park).

The park has a smooth 3.5 km tarmac road race/time trial cycle circuit which can be divided into a 1.5 km circuit, a two kilometre circuit or the full 3.5 km circuit. The circuit is six metres wide and eight metres wide on its finishing straight. British Cycling, the UK's national governing body for cycling have described the circuit as among the best outdoor tarmac road cycle circuits in the UK. There is also a long mountain biking track around the park. Various cycling and running competitions are held at the Country Park including a Guinness Book of Records record attempt twenty-four-hour Mobility Scooter Endurance Challenge by the Red Wheelies (Mobility Scooter Formation Team). They completed 77 laps (154 miles), smashing the previous record of 88 miles.

In 2022, the park became the only location in the UK, to hire an off-road electric vehicle called the 'e-Spider' with unique pendulum suspension by the French designed and manufactured Swincar. It is an all-terrain one-sitter leisure electric vehicle that does an hour long tour of the park.

At July, 29th 2023 the first british Ultraskate will take place at the Betteshanger Park. An Ultraskate is an event where riders try to achieve as many miles within 24h. This event is limited to longboard and skateboard riders.

== Waiting Miner Campaign ==
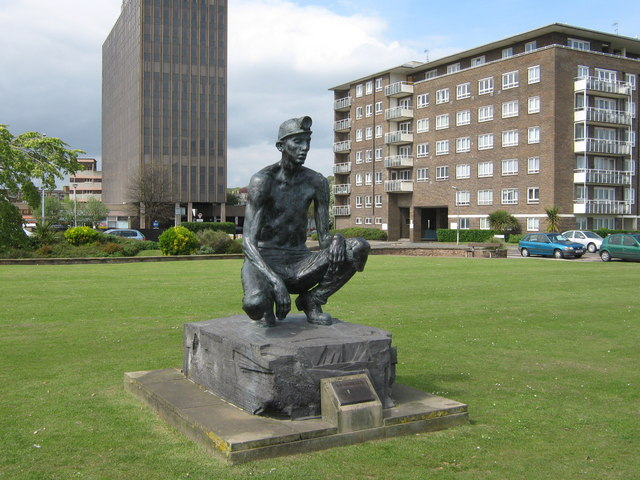
Waiting Miner in Dover before the move

The "Waiting Miner" statue was commissioned by the Central Electricity Generating Board and was moved from its original site (outside Richborough power station) when the coal-fired plant was decommissioned. Each of Kent’s mining communities (Betteshanger, Chislet, Snowdown and Tilmanstone), had their own recommendations for a new site for the statue, but these were ignored and eventually it was resited outside the National Coal Board’s office in Dover. The Coal Board Offices eventually closed down in 1987, leaving the statue isolated on the seafront in Dover.

In 2001, Dover District Council launched the Coalfields Heritage Initiative Kent (CHIK) project, in order to record and preserve the mining heritage of Kent. It included the creation of the Miner's Way Trail (a 30 mile cycle-route linking all the coal mining villages in East Kent).

In September 2006, the "Move The Miner" campaign was launched. The campaign committee considered Aylesham Village Square (another former mining community) or on the A258 highway at the entrance to Betteshanger Park. The Country Park on the coal field spoil heap was chosen as the new site. The next stage was to obtain planning permission and persuade everyone to agree to the new site.

The statue was moved in July 2010. The campaign group then were granted £5000 in funds from the Coalfields Regeneration Trust for seating, information boards and the plinth around the statue. The park then held the Kent Miners Festival, which took place over the Sunday and Monday of the bank holiday weekend, 29–30 August 2010. The event was so popular that it has become an annual event with the venue changing from year to year. In 2015 the festival returned to Betteshanger.
