= Parks and open spaces in the Royal Borough of Kingston upon Thames =

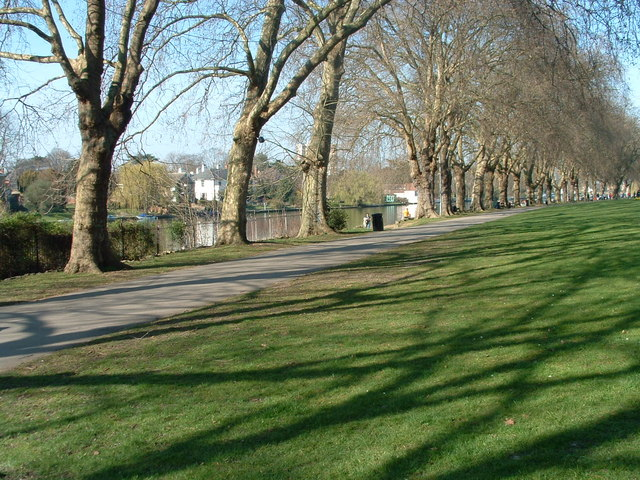
Canbury Gardens

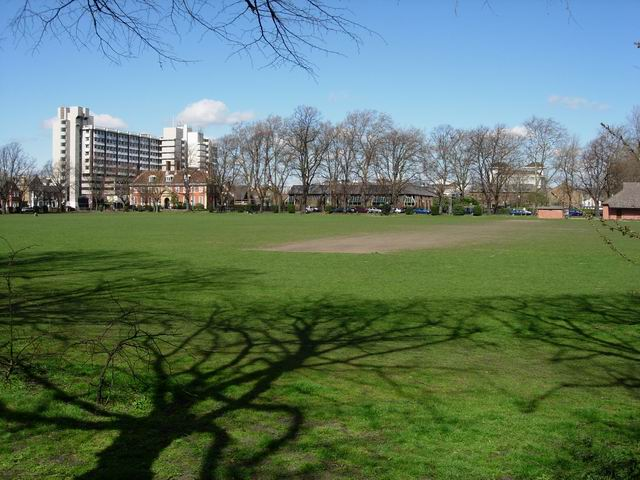
The Fairfield in Kingston

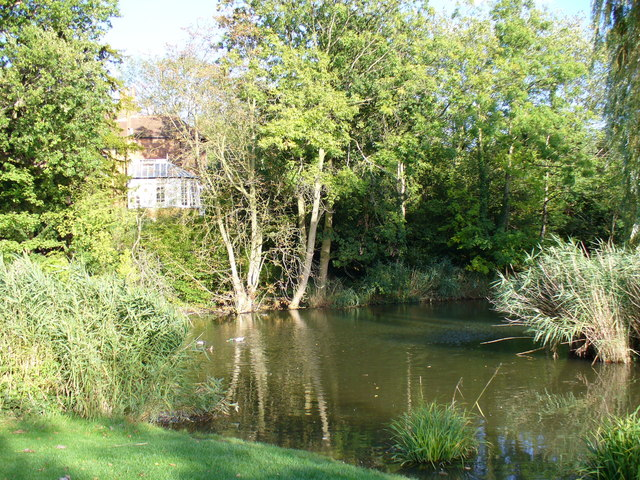
Fishponds Park, Tolworth

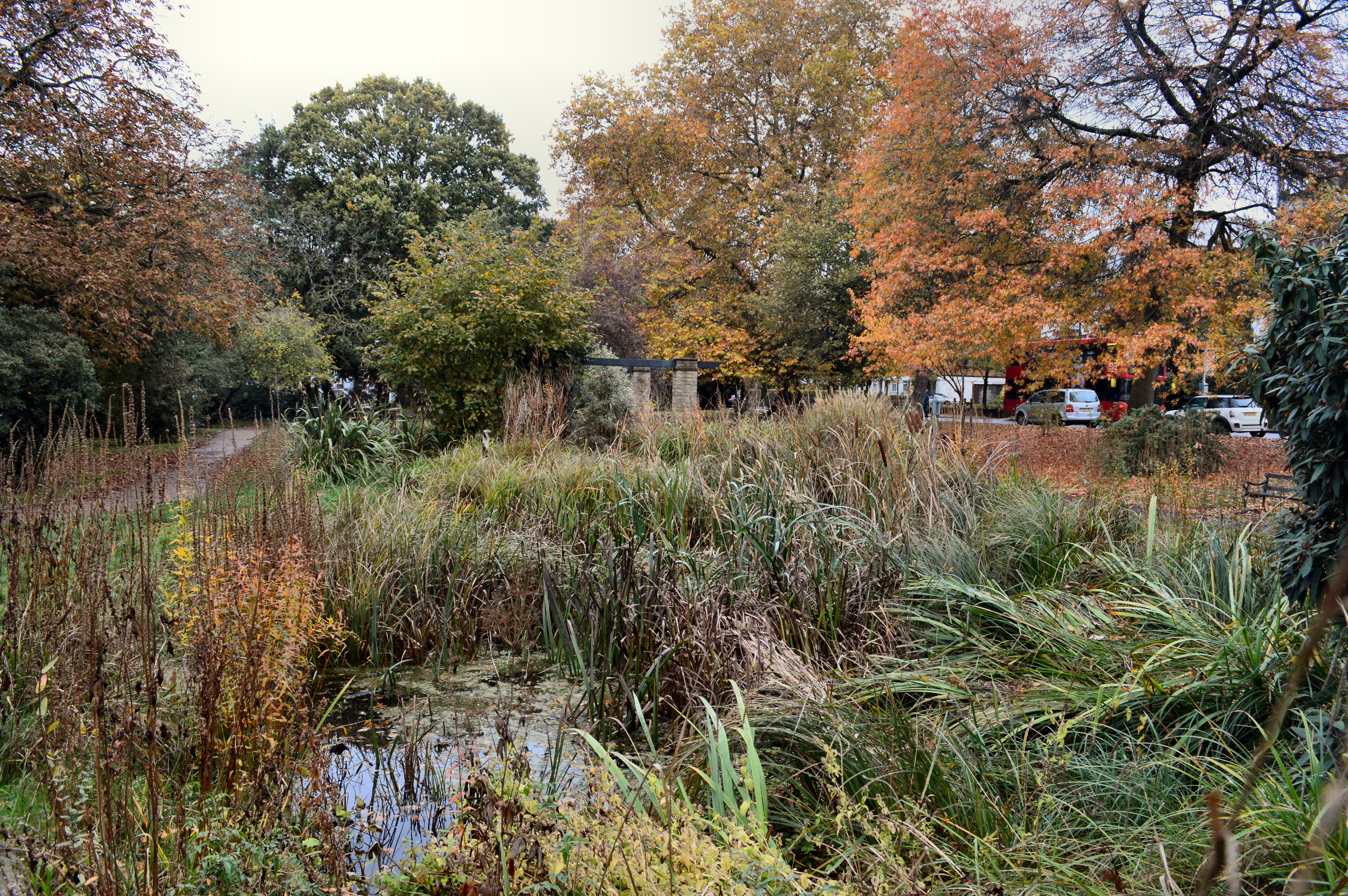
Claremont Gardens, Surbiton

The Royal Borough of Kingston upon Thames is located along a stretch of the River Thames where the Hogsmill River joins the former at the town of Kingston. The Borough contains over 30 parks, 24 playgrounds, sports grounds and open spaces. There are also over 20 allotments sites which are either self-managed or run by the local council. An assessment conducted in 2006 identified 165 hectares (410 acres) of park and 340 hectares (840 acres) of other open spaces in the borough.

Much of the borough's Thames river frontage is open and accessible to the public. To the north of the town centre Canbury Gardens extends to the Lower Ham Road beyond which the Dysart open space, Royal Park Gate recreation ground and the adjacent Hawker Centre sports ground form a continuation of Ham Lands in the neighbouring London Borough of Richmond upon Thames. To the south of the town centre Queens Promenade provides open river frontage as far as Surbiton. Pedestrian access to the course of the Hogsmill River leads from its mouth at the Thames, south of the town centre, to the Hogsmill River Park and beyond.

Other open spaces include the western half of Beverley Park and the University of London Athletic Ground and the BBC Sports Ground, Motspur Park.

Historically, the southern tip of Richmond Park fell within the borough boundaries but it was incorporated into Richmond upon Thames in 1994.

The local authority's approach to managing its parks and open spaces are set out in its Green Spaces strategy, 2015–2021.

The main parks and open spaces managed by Kingston upon Thames Borough Council are:

Name	Locality	Notes
Alexandra Recreation Ground	Surbiton	
Athelstan Recreation Ground	Kingston	
Barton Green	New Malden	
Beverley Park	New Malden	
Blagdon Road Recreation Ground	New Malden	
Canbury Gardens	Canbury	
Castle Hill Local Nature Reserve	Chessington	
Churchfields Recreation Ground	Chessington	
Claremont Crescent Gardens	Surbiton	
Cromwell Open Space	New Malden	
Dickerage Recreation Ground	New Malden	
Dysart open space	Canbury	Contiguous part of Ham Lands
Elmbridge Meadows	Berrylands	Hogsmill Valley
Elm Road Recreation Ground	Kingston	
Fairfield Recreation Ground	Kingston	
Fishponds Park	Surbiton	
Green Lane Recreation Ground	New Malden	Hogsmill Valley
King Edwards Recreation Ground	Chessington	
King George's recreation Ground	Chessington	
Kingston Road Recreation Ground	New Malden	
Latchmere Recreation Ground	Canbury	
Long Meadows	Old Malden	Hogsmill Valley
Manor Park	Old Malden	
Memorial Gardens	Kingston	
Queens Promenade	Kingston to Surbiton	
Raeburn Avenue Open Space	Berrylands	
RAF Chessington	Hook	
Royal Park Gate Open Space	Canbury	
Rose Walk	Berrylands	Hogsmill Valley
Sir Frances Barker Recreation Ground	Chessington	
Southwood Open Space	Old Malden	Hogsmill Valley
St Andrews Square	Seething Wells	
Tolworth Court Farm Fields Local Nature Reserve	Tolworth	
Woodgate Avenue	Chessington	
The Wood and Richard Jefferies Bird Sanctuary	Surbiton	
