= List of common land in London =

This is a list of common land in London, England. Most common land in England is registered for the purposes of the Commons Act 2006, but some commons are protected under separate local acts, such as Wimbledon and Putney Commons, which are protected under the Wimbledon and Putney Commons Act 1871.

== Registered land ==
The following are common lands registered for the purposes of the Commons Act 2006.

Name	Borough	Area (hectares)
Acton Green	Ealing	5.9
Back Green	Kingston upon Thames	0.7
Barnes Common and Barnes Green	Richmond upon Thames	49.55
Biggin Hill Green	Bromley	0.17
Blackheath	Lewisham/Greenwich	85.58
Bostall Heath	Greenwich	29.88
Bradmore Green	Croydon	1.5
Broadstreet Green	Bromley	1.65
Brook Green	Hammersmith and Fulham	2.05
Broomhill Common	Bromley	0.71
Castlebar Green	Ealing	0.1
Chiswick Common	Hounslow	3.2
Cholmondeley Walk	Richmond upon Thames	0.24
Clapham Common	Wandsworth/Lambeth	78.01
Clapham Common (part)	Wandsworth	0.16
Clapton Common	Hackney	2.58
Cuckoo Green	Ealing	0.1
Darrick Common	Bromley	0.9
Drayton Green	Ealing	1.2
Ealing Common	Ealing	15.65
Ealing Green	Ealing	1.3
East Acton Green	Ealing	0.3
East Sheen Common	Richmond upon Thames	21.29
Eel Brook Common (Note: Listed on register as Eelbrook Common)	Hammersmith and Fulham	6.09
Eltham Common	Greenwich	13.02
Farnborough Common	Bromley	4.97
Friars Place Green	Ealing	0.1
Frogmore Green	Ealing	0.1
Garratt Green (Note: Listed on register as Garrett Green)	Wandsworth	3.2
Goose Green	Southwark	2
Green Street Green	Bromley	3.94
Gumping Common	Bromley	0.4
Hackney Downs	Hackney	16.48
Hackney Marsh	Hackney/Waltham Forest	136.01
Hainault Forest, known as Lambourne Common	Redbridge (extends into Epping Forest District)	79.92
Ham Common	Richmond upon Thames	48.69
Hammers Hill Waste (part of the waste of the Manor of Hendon)	Barnet	0.5
Hampstead Heath	Camden	144.93
Harrow Weald Common	Harrow	19.55
Haven Green	Ealing	0.83
Hayes Common	Bromley	91.1
Ickenham Green	Hillingdon	6.5
Ickenham Marsh	Hillingdon	7.62
Keston Common	Bromley	21.48
Kew Pond	Richmond upon Thames	0.18
Kidbrooke Green	Greenwich	1.37
Lacey Green	Croydon	0.42
Land at junction of Tudor Gardens and Prince's Gardens	Ealing	0.04
Land between Church Street and The Thames	Hounslow	0.02
Land called Broadwalk	Camden	0.1
Land either side of Bird Lane and Hall Lane	Havering	3.29
Land in Accommodation Lane	Hillingdon	0.14
Land in Bath Road	Hillingdon	0.1
Land in Bath Road	Hillingdon	0.09
Land in Bird Lane	Havering	3.38
Land in the London Borough of Southwark	Southwark	0.6
Land in front of Dulwich College	Southwark	0.5
Land in front of 11–25 and 33–41, College Road	Southwark	0.5
Land in front of 93–115, Dulwich Village	Southwark	0.3
Land in Hall Lane	Havering	2.54
Land in Moor Lane	Hillingdon	0.07
Land in Moor Lane	Hillingdon	0.12
Land in Moor Lane	Hillingdon	0.04
Land on Colnbrook by-pass	Hillingdon	0.19
Land opposite Turnham Green Post Office	Hounslow	0.03
Large Poor's Field, Ruislip Common	Hillingdon	16.38
Leaves Green	Bromley	7.52
Little Common	Harrow	2.5
Little Eltham Common (King George's Fields/Kidbrooke Common)	Greenwich	1.99
Little Wormwood Scrubs	Hammersmith and Fulham	8.42
London Fields	Hackney	12.84
Malden Green	Kingston upon Thames	2.11
Mattock Green	Ealing	0.4
Milespit Hill Waste (part of the waste of the Manor of Hendon)	Barnet	0.9
Mitcham Common	Merton	182
Mitcham Common & Surrounding Green Spaces	Merton/Sutton/Croydon	448
Monken Hadley Common	Barnet	73.49
No Man's Land	Hillingdon	1.4
North Millfields	Hackney	9.94
Northolt Village Green	Ealing	0.8
Nunhead Green	Southwark	0.18
Old Hill	Bromley	0.83
Old Oak Common (Note: Listed on register as Old Oaks Common)	Ealing	3.92
Palewell Common	Richmond upon Thames	5.83
Parsons Green	Hammersmith and Fulham	1.03
Peckham Rye Common	Southwark	22.5
Pesthouse Common	Richmond upon Thames	0.93
Petersham Common	Richmond upon Thames	7.01
Pickhurst Green	Bromley	3.16
Plough Green	Kingston upon Thames	0.21
Plumstead Common (Note: Listed on register as Plumstead Green)	Greenwich	40.83
Poor's Field	Hillingdon	5.08
Pratt's Bottom Green	Bromley	0.6
Public footpath alongside 3, St Mary's Grove	Hounslow	0.01
River Wandle (part)	Sutton	0.12
Rowley Green	Barnet	8.8
Rushett Common	Kingston upon Thames	7.2
Shepherds Bush Common	Hammersmith and Fulham	3.13
Short Lots	Richmond upon Thames	0.55
Shoulder of Mutton Green	Bexley	1.5
South Millfields	Hackney	14.99
Sparrow Common	Bromley	0.2
Stamford Brook Common	Hounslow	1.02
Stanmore Common	Harrow	48.15
Stanmore Marsh	Harrow	3.91
Stoke Newington Common	Hackney	2.15
Streatham Common	Lambeth	23.93
The River Walk and Towpath	Richmond upon Thames	2.56
The Rookery	Lambeth	3.88
Tooting Bec Common	Wandsworth/Lambeth	58.12
Tooting Graveney Common	Wandsworth	22.13
Totteridge Common and Totteridge Green	Barnet	13.92
Turnham Green Common	Hounslow	2.98
Tylers Common	Havering	32.06
Tylers Common (part)	Havering	0.19
Tylers Common (part)	Havering	0.53
Uxbridge Common	Hillingdon	5.63
Uxbridge Common (part)	Hillingdon	5.69
Wandsworth Common	Wandsworth	69.43
Watts Common	Hillingdon	2.27
Well Street Common	Hackney	8.66
Westerley Ware	Richmond upon Thames	1.11
Winn's Common	Greenwich	?
Wise Lane Waste (part of the waste of the Manor of Hendon)	Barnet	0.66
Woolwich Common	Greenwich	60
Wormwood Scrubs	Hammersmith and Fulham	73.47
