= Raeburn Open Space =

Local nature reserve in London

- Berrylands Nature Reserve
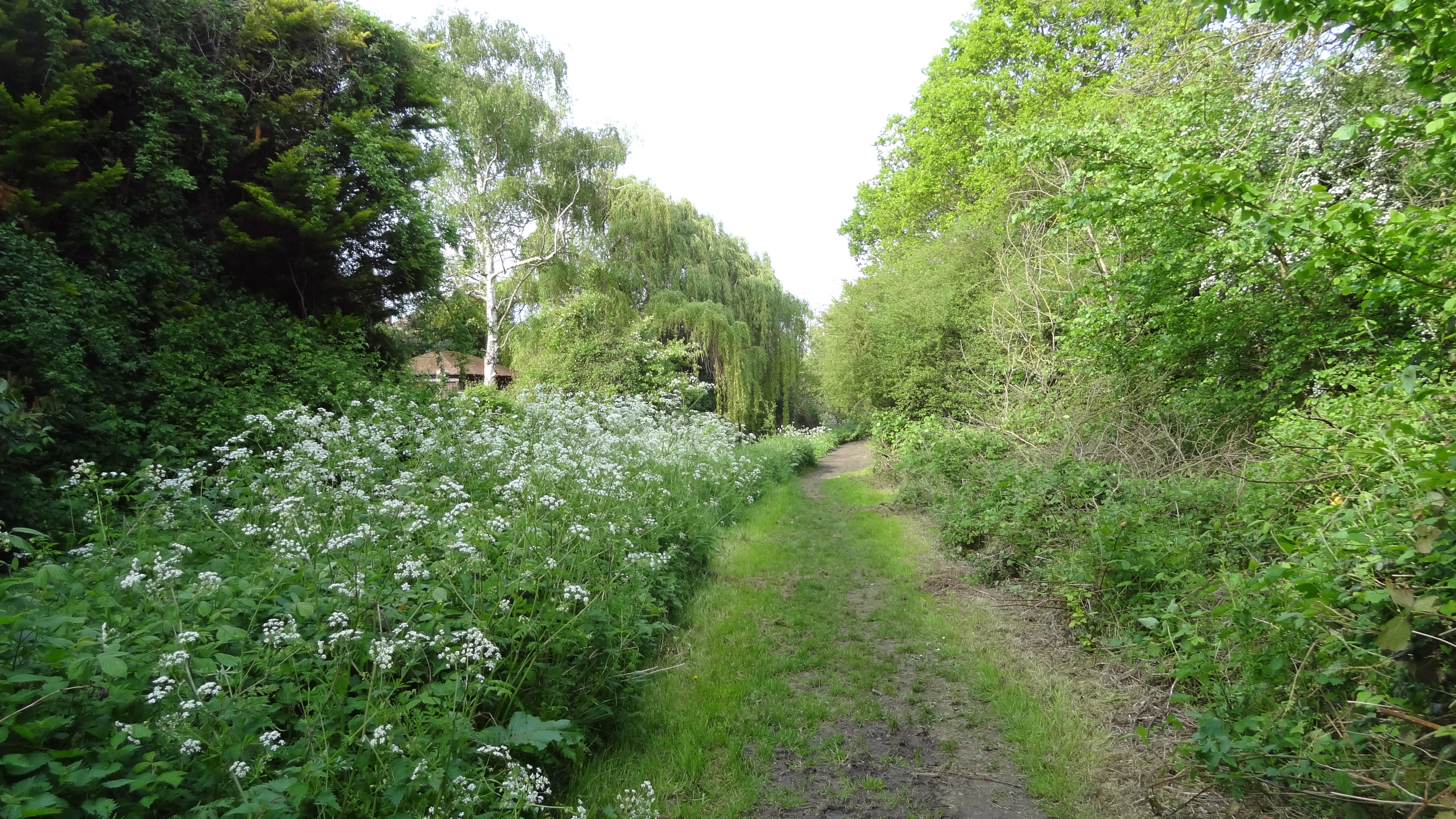
- Path through Berrylands Nature Reserve along the Surbiton Stream

- Location within Greater London
- Type: Local Nature Reserve
- Location: Berrylands, Kingston
- Coordinates: 51.3931°N 0.27954°W
- Area: 5 hectares (12 acres)
- Designated: 1992
- Operator: Kingston Council
- Open: All year
- Website: berrylandsnaturereserve.org

Raeburn Open Space, locally known as Berrylands Nature Reserve, is a 5-hectare Local Nature Reserve and Site of Borough Importance for Nature Conservation, Grade 1, in Berrylands in the Royal Borough of Kingston upon Thames in London, England. It is owned and managed by Kingston Council. but is mainly maintained by local community volunteers. Officially declared a nature reserve in 1992, little was done to manage it as a nature reserve until 2017 when a community initiative began.

The site is a linear park along the Tolworth Brook (also known as the Surbiton Stream), a tributary of the Hogsmill River, which is the life blood of the nature reserve. It has areas of mown grass, unmanaged grassland, scrub and woods, together with ancient hedgerows which have a variety of native plants. Birds include jays, stock doves, great spotted woodpeckers and kingfishers, and there are invertebrates such as the ringlet butterfly.

The park adjoins the former Surbiton Lagoon, now Berrylands Park, to the south. Rose Walk is to the north and Elmbridge Open Space to the east. There are four main access points: off Elmbridge Avenue, from either end of Stirling Walk off Grand Avenue and Raeburn Avenue, and from Meldone Close.

In 2017, the Environment Trust successfully bid for a grant from Thames Water which was to restore and enhance the nature reserve over three years. This project has been a great success and has attracted many locals to support the nature reserve. Work completed has included removing sections of concrete channelling from the stream sides and base, naturalising it instead, building a new wooden bridge to create a trail on the far side of the stream linking to the old concrete bridge, digging a new wildlife pond, clearing invasive plants, regular litter picking and other general conservation work.

== Friends of Berrylands Nature Reserve ==
In September 2018, as a continuation of the community support built up during the restoration project, the "Friends of Berrylands Nature Reserve" community group was formed with the aim “to improve Berrylands Nature Reserve for the benefit of both wildlife and the local community, and where possible support other local green spaces.”

This group now coordinates conservation activity and other community events at the site, and helps to look after both the nature reserve and other local green spaces.
