= Bonesgate Stream =

River in London, England

Coordinates: 51°21′09″N 0°18′06″W

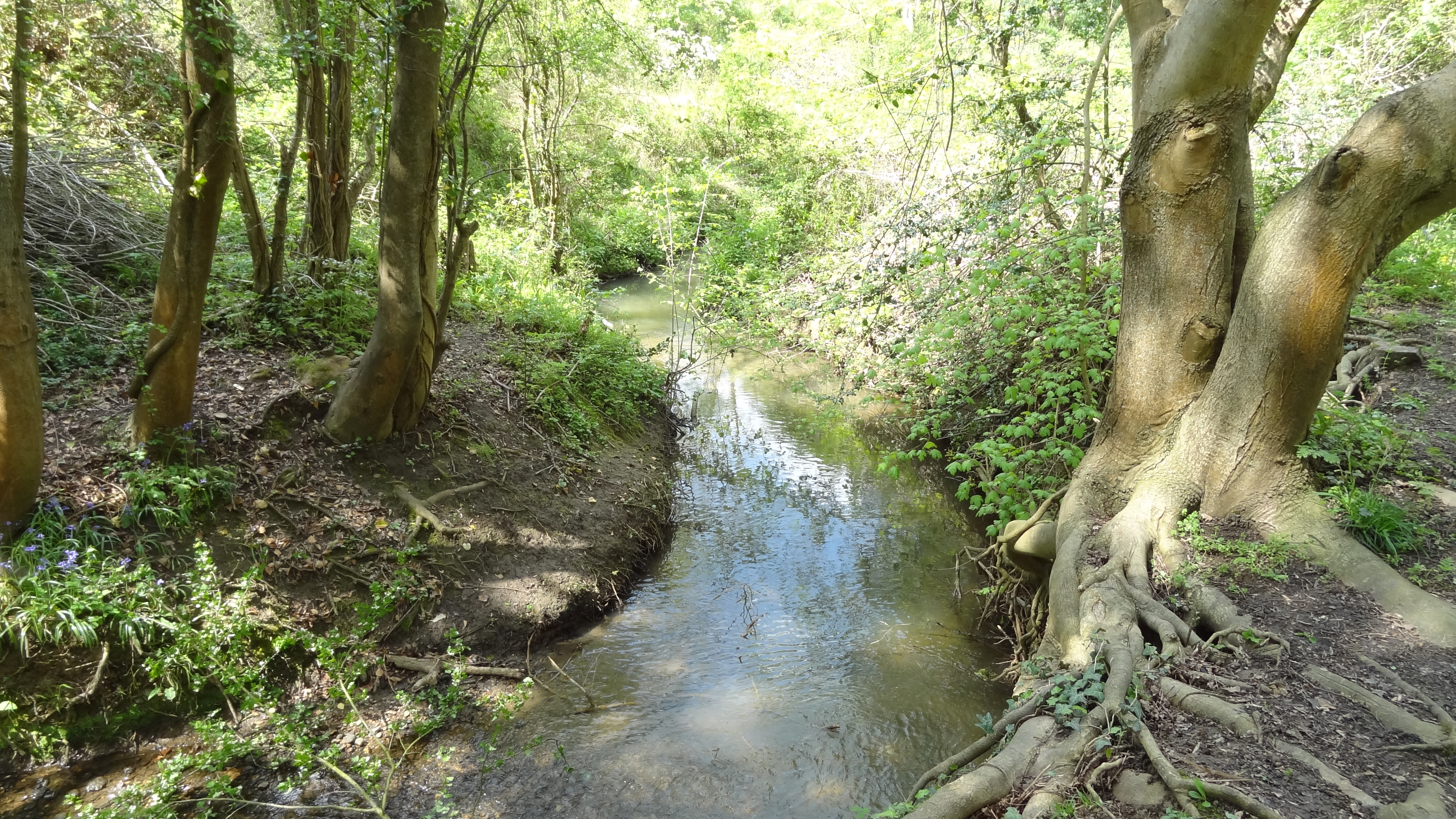
Bonesgate Stream in Castle Hill

Bonesgate Stream is a brook in Chessington in Kingston upon Thames in London and Epsom and Ewell in Surrey. It is a tributary of the Hogsmill River, which, in turn, is a tributary of the River Thames.

== Course ==
One arm rises in Horton Country Park, the other in Chessington Wood, joining at TQ 18362 62850 east of Chessington Golf Course. The brook then flows north-east through Castle Hill and Bonesgate Open Space Local Nature Reserves via Filby Road to Chessington Road. The stream continues north-east into the Hogsmill Open space, where it serves as the Greater London/Surrey boundary. It skirts the northern edge of West Ewell, passing between the Wateredge Estate on one side, and Tolworth Court Farm Fields on the other. It joins the Hogsmill near Tolworth Court Bridge, at the junction of Kingston Road and Worcester Park Road.
