= Parks and open spaces in the London Borough of Ealing =

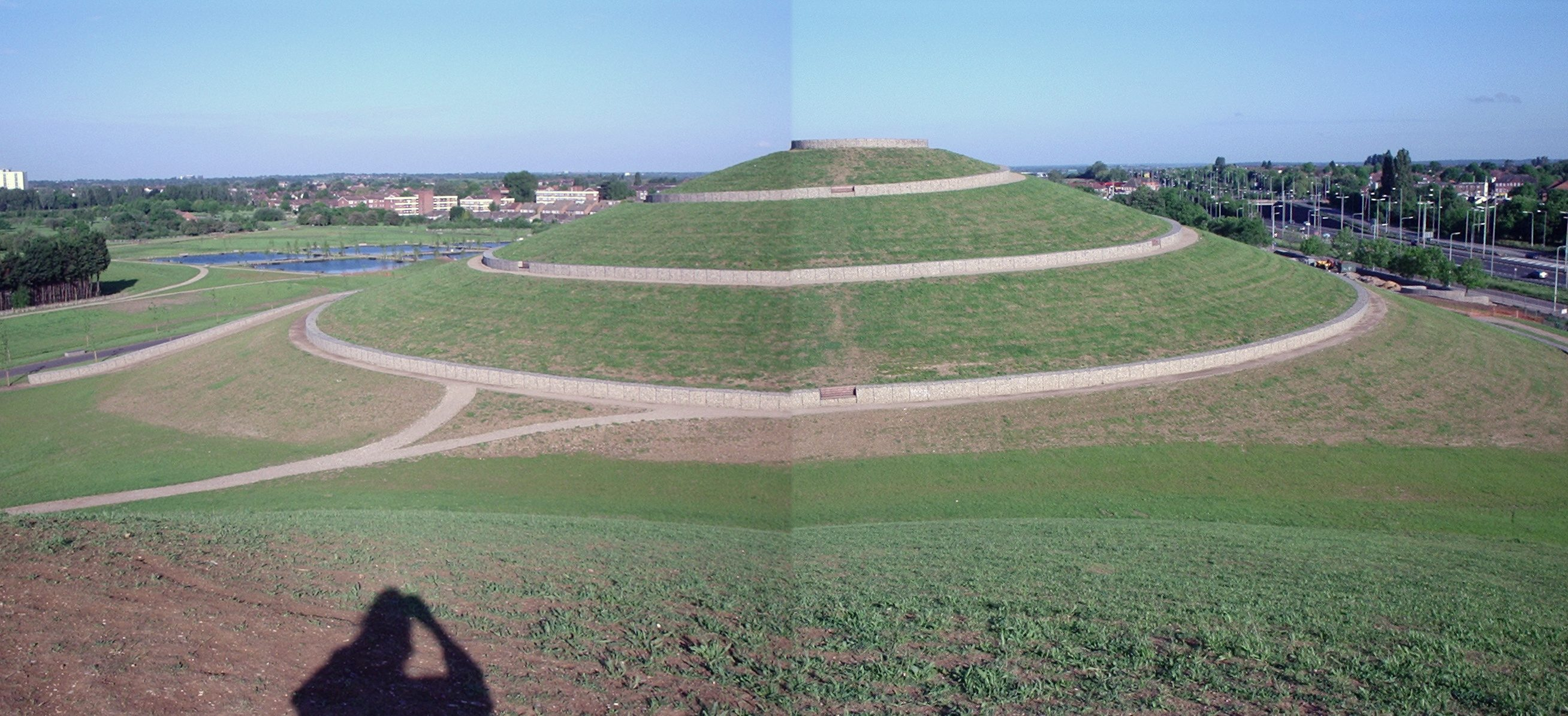
One of the four hills in Northala Fields

The London Borough of Ealing, one of the outer London boroughs although not on the periphery, has over 100 parks and open spaces within its boundaries. These include allotments, cemeteries, playgrounds, and golf courses in addition to the larger open spaces such as nature conservation areas.

== Parks ==
- Acton Green Common – small open space with children's play area adjacent to Chiswick Common on the Hounslow side of the municipal boundary.
- Acton Park – a Victorian park opened in 1888.
- Blondin Park – includes a small nature area. This was officially opened by Gavin Redman who is the great-great grandson of Blondin. ^{[a]}
- Bramley Gardens – Built on top of a landfill site, the park was reopened in 2012.
- Brent Lodge Park – Sometimes known locally as Bunny Park, the large area of land contains the Millenium Maze, sports area, child play areas, cafe as well as Hanwell Zoo. There are large expanses of meadow and green areas with the River Brent also accessible.
- Cuckoo Park – A horseshoe shape park in Hanwell containing a children play area.
- Dean Gardens – Small park in West Ealing used as allotments until 1909. Contains a children's play area.
- Drayton Green – Green open space with children's play area in West Ealing.
- Down Way – Small area of land that contains a multi-use games area (MUGA).
- Ealing Central Sports Ground - located in Perivale, the park has a child’s play area as well as cricket and football pitches.
- Ealing Common – Large area of flat, open grassland ringed by mature roadside trees. Used for grazing animals in the last century, it is still possible to see the occasional rider. Stages circuses and fairs.
- Glade Lane Canal-side Park – Near to the grand union canal this park includes a children play area as well as nature conservation areas. There is also a BMX track.
- Gunnersbury Park – while located on the Hounslow side of the Ealing/Hounslow boundary, Gunnersbury Park is jointly owned by Ealing and Hounslow and administered by a joint committee of the two councils.
- Hanger Hill Park – includes a fragment of oak woodland (Fox Wood) to the west, now a Fox Wood Nature Reserve.
- Hanger Hill Wood – there are many interesting native trees to enjoy on this walk, and there may be woodpeckers or red foxes to spot.
- Horsenden Hill – Large area for nature conservation that contains woodland, grassland, wetland and meadows.
- Islip Manor Park – located in Northolt part of which is used for the conservation of nature.
- Jubilee Park – Located in Southall, this park has a children play area and large open area of grass.
- King George Playing Fields – located in Hanwell.
- Lammas Park – 25 acres (10 ha). The name derives from 'Lammas lands', which were used for grazing cattle in medieval times. Bowling green, croquet pitch, tennis courts, children's playground and playcentre. The park nearly adjoins Walpole park mentioned below.
- Lime Tree Park – located in Northolt the park contains a pond.
- Montpelier Park – On the site of a previous girl school (Princess Helena College).
- Northala Fields – a development of derelict land adjoining Rectory Fields in Northolt.
- Norwood Green – triangular expanse of village green with a child play area and walking path.
- Ravenor Park – Mostly formal park located in Greenford that contains a children play area as well as a section used for nature conservation.
- Southall Park – The park contains a children play area, as well as MUGAs including tennis courts.
- Spikes Bridge Park – Located in Southall, this park has MUGAs, play area and a pond.
- Three Bridges Park – a small area of greenery located next to the Three Bridges and Grand Union Canal opened in 2013.

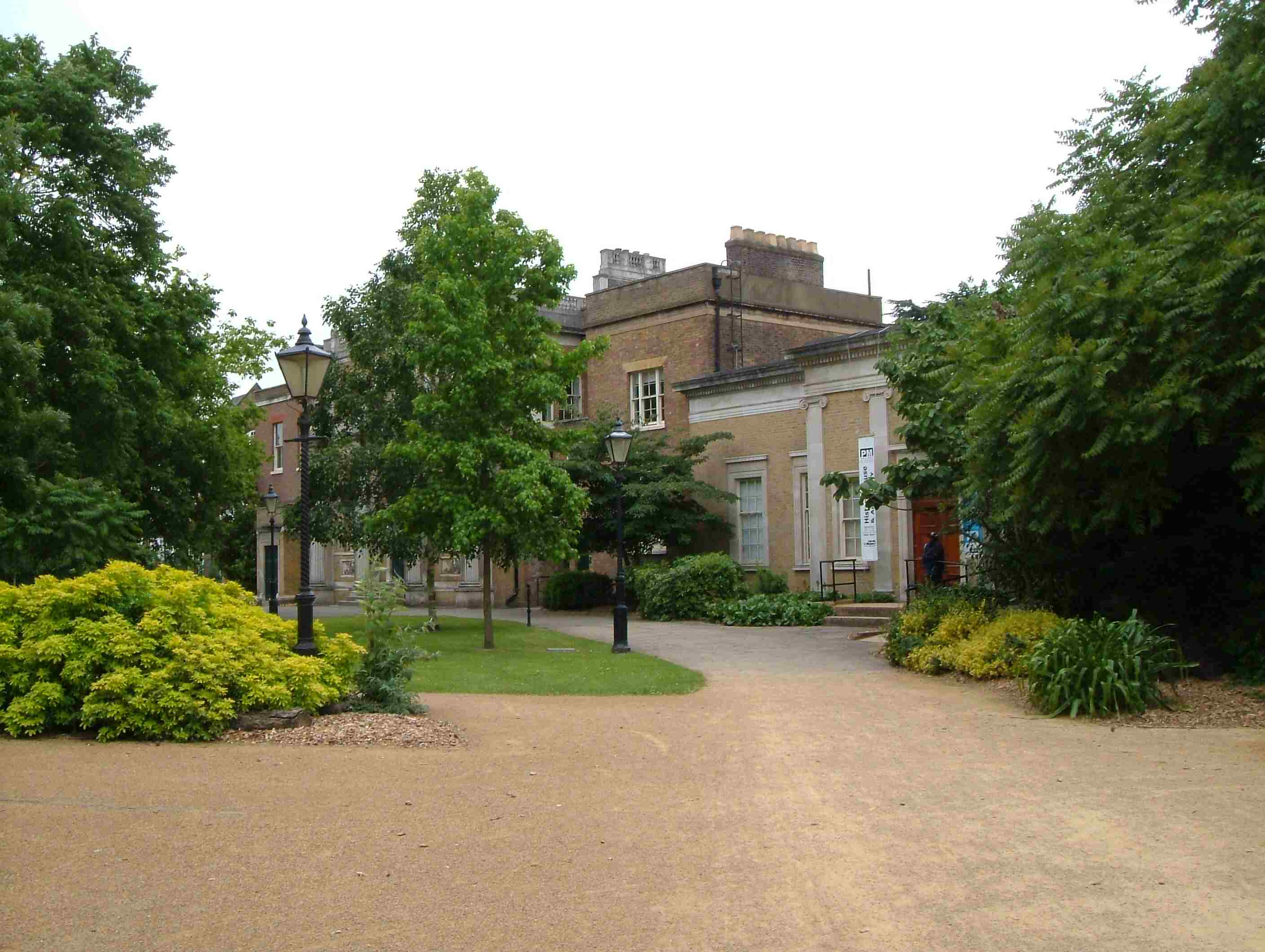
Walpole park museum

- Walpole Park – Ealing's "premier park". Hosts a jazz and comedy festival in the summer, and also contains the Pitzhanger Manor museum. Contains a walled rose garden, semi-formal rest garden with wildlife pond, larger pond with fountain, open grass areas for games. The whole is enclosed either by railings and planted screening or surrounding houses. The park is closed at nights.
- Wolf Fields Park – Located in Southall the park contains a bowling green

== Brent River Park ==
Large areas along the River Brent collectively are known as the Brent River Park with numerous areas containing sports grounds, playing fields and golf courses.^{[b]} 80% is owned by the council, while only 5% is privately owned (with the rest being owned by public bodies). The park is a key nature conservation area.

Some of these areas are below.

- Bitterns Field
- Boles Meadow
- Brent Meadow
- Conolly Den
- Elthorne Park – also contains children play area and bandstand
- Elthorne Waterside
- Fitzherbert Walk
- Hanwell Meadows – contains Jubilee Meadows, Blackberry Corner, Trumpers Field and St Margaret's
- Long Wood – contains ancient woodland
- Perivale Park – a sports park containing football and cricket pitches, tennis and multi-use games area (MUGA) courts and a full size athletics track (with car park), as well as a pocket park featuring an orchard, community raised bed gardening, flower meadows, seating benches and the flagpole for a Green Flag Award. The Capital ring runs through the park and the River Brent runs nearby. There is a Friends group.
- Pitshanger Park – Long meandering park following the river Brent. Tennis courts and bowling greens, selection of football pitches and open grass. Adjacent Golf course and Rugby club. Park remains open at nights, but car park is locked.
- Warren Farm – 61 acres of Metropolitan Open Land. In 2014, the council planned to lease the land to Queen's Park Rangers, for 200 years, to use as a training centre. This caused local protests over the financial terms and a judicial review was held to challenge the deal which found in favour of the Council. The plan was withdrawn and the area is currently (as of June 2022) wildflower meadow.

The Brent River Park was one of 11 parks throughout Greater London chosen to receive money for redevelopment by a public vote in 2009. The park received £400,000 towards better footpaths, more lighting, refurbished public toilets and new play areas for children.

== Other ==
- Berkeley Fields, Greenford – large area including three golf courses
- Ealing Green – a small area of grass and trees close to Ealing's historical centre, occasionally used for small fairs and other events.
- Fox Wood Nature Reserve – part of Hanger Hill Park near Hanger Lane tube station
- Hanger Hill Wood – there are many interesting native trees to enjoy on this walk, and there may be woodpeckers or red foxes to spot.
- Haven Green – Small open green with smattering of mature trees and flowerbeds opposite Ealing Broadway station in the town centre. Popular for lunchtime breaks in the summer.
- West Middlesex Golf Club

== Allotments ==
Across the London Borough of Ealing there are 63 allotments sites. Most are council-owned but a few are independent. The allotments in this part of London dramatically increased during World War II as part of the government effort to feed the nation. To encourage the uptake of allotment plots by people who had no access to a garden themselves, a campaign was waged under the slogan “Dig for Victory”. Towards the later end of the 20th century they became popular again amongst the growing ethnic communities, as a source of some of their more familiar and traditional vegetables which were otherwise unobtainable in British shops. Some local organisations have now formally recognised some of the benefits that come from working on allotments and actively encourage their use. Ealing Council has also signed up to the Unitary Development Plan which it is hoped will safeguard the existing allotments from building developers.

== Notes ==
a. This park is named after the French aerialist Charles Blondin (who was first to cross the Niagara Falls on a tightrope). He once lived in a house on Northfield Avenue, Little Ealing and the park covers what was formerly the western part of its large grounds.

b. The Brent River Park is not only a public amenity but forms an important part of the borough's Green Corridors with which to aid nature conservation. Also, by prohibiting development on what is much of the river Brent's natural flood plain, it provides some measure of flood control.
