= Southwood Open Space =

Nature reserve in London, England

Coordinates: 51.3861°N 0.2693°W

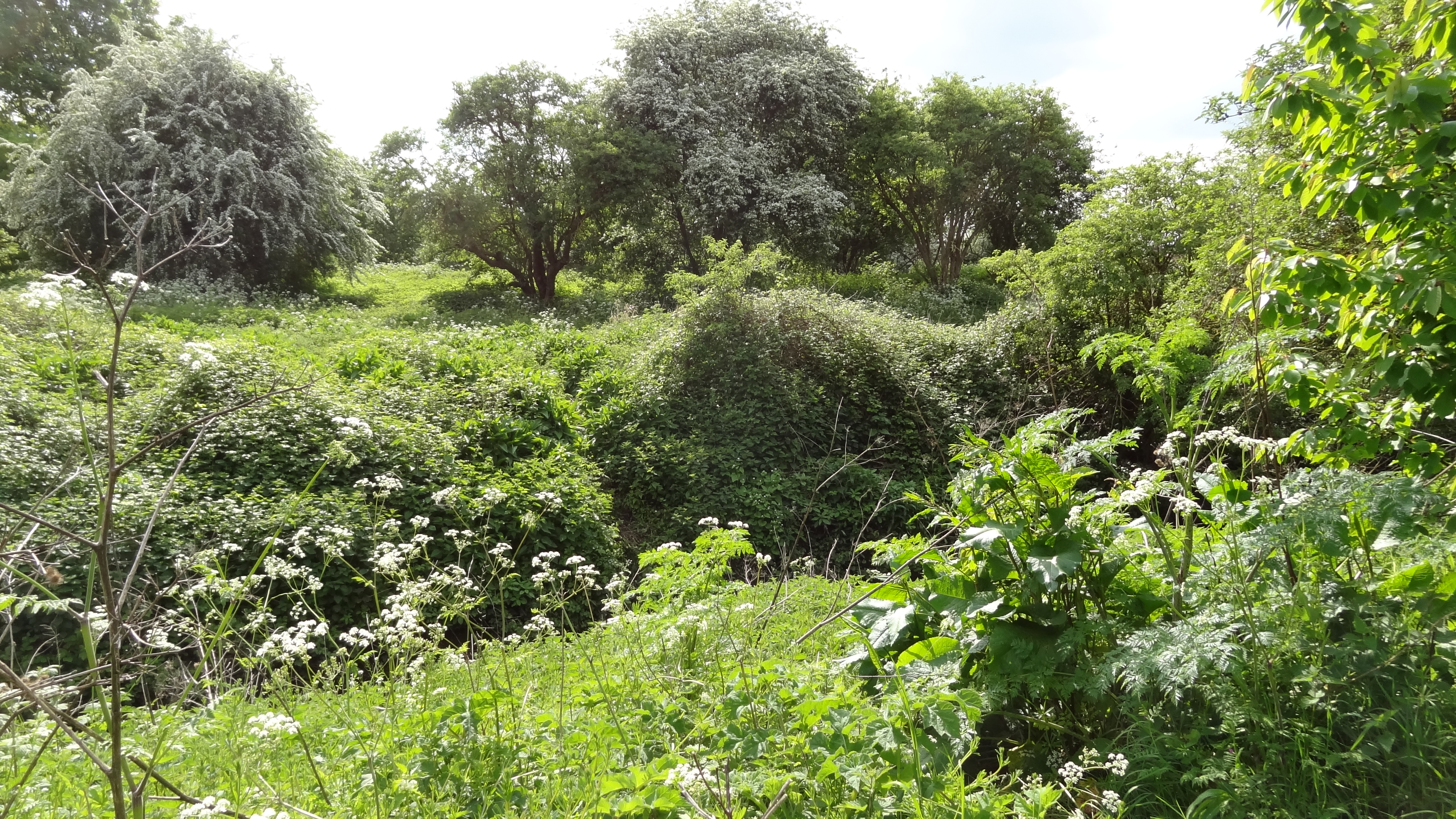
Southwood Open Space

Southwood Open Space is a 12.9 hectare Local Nature Reserve (LNR) in Old Malden in the Royal Borough of Kingston upon Thames in London. It is a linear park along the Hogsmill River, south of the Kingston Bypass.

The open space forms the southern part of the Hogsmill River Park, which extends north to Elmbridge Open Space LNR. Hogsmill Valley is designated a Site of Borough Importance for Nature Conservation, Grade 1.

The site is mainly grassland, with hedgerows of elm scrub. These were mainly dominated by elm trees until they were destroyed by Dutch Elm Disease.

The London Loop long-distance walk goes through the park.
