= Bonesgate Open Space =

Public park in London, England

Coordinates: 51.3608°N 0.29076°W

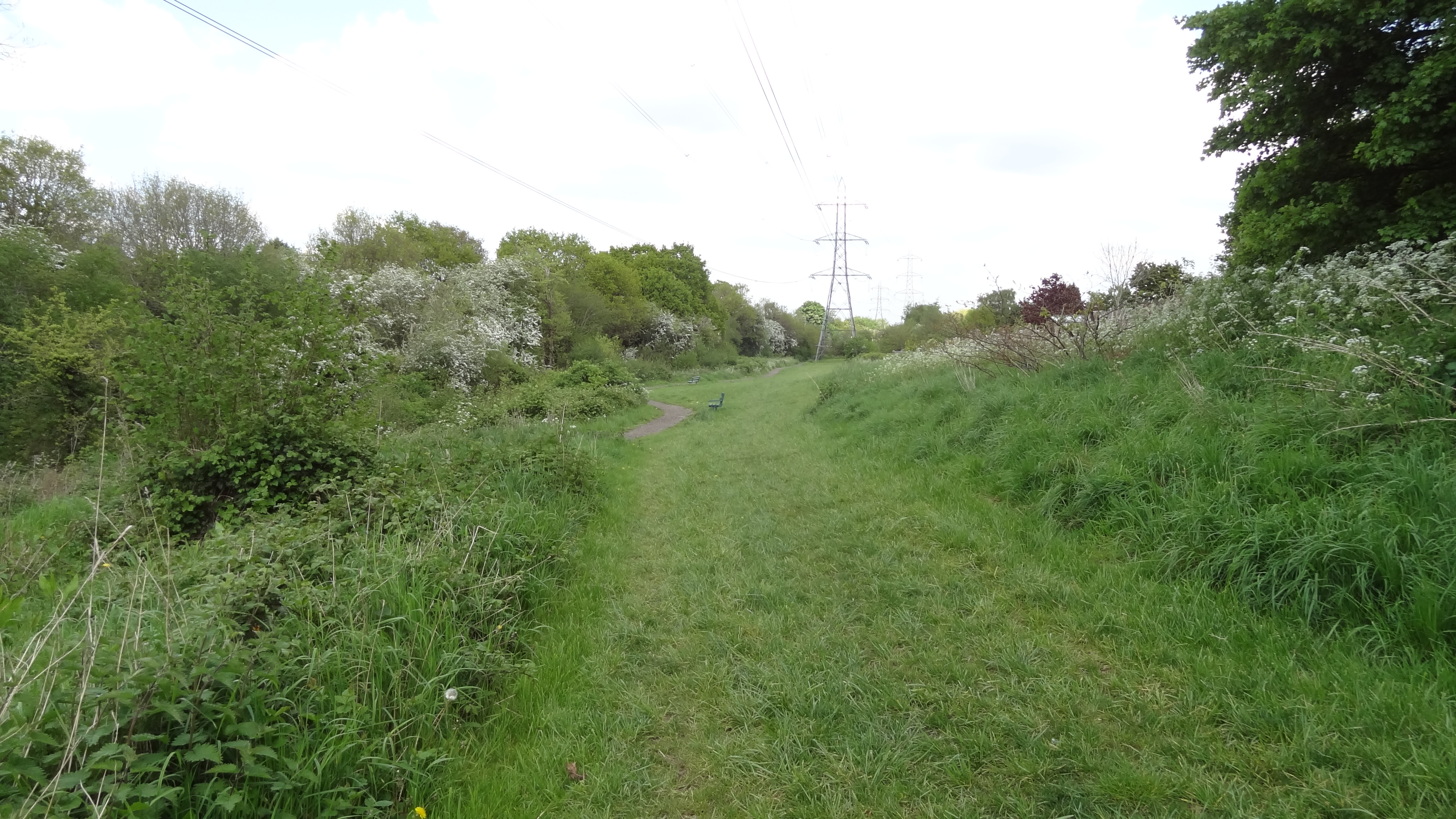

Bonesgate Open Space is a public park, Local Nature Reserve (LNR) and Site of Borough Importance for Nature Conservation, Grade 1, in Chessington in the Royal Borough of Kingston upon Thames in London. It has an area of 5.07 hectares, and was designated an LNR in 1994.

The site is a linear park along the banks of the Bonesgate Stream between Chessington Road and Filby Road. It adjoins Castle Hill LNR to the south and Hogsmill LNR (in Epsom and Ewell) to the north. It is mainly grassland with some coppiced hazel, which has the locally rare goldilocks buttercup. Birds include the great spotted woodpecker, song thrush and lesser whitethroat.
