= Surbiton Lagoon =

Swimming pool in Surbiton, London, England

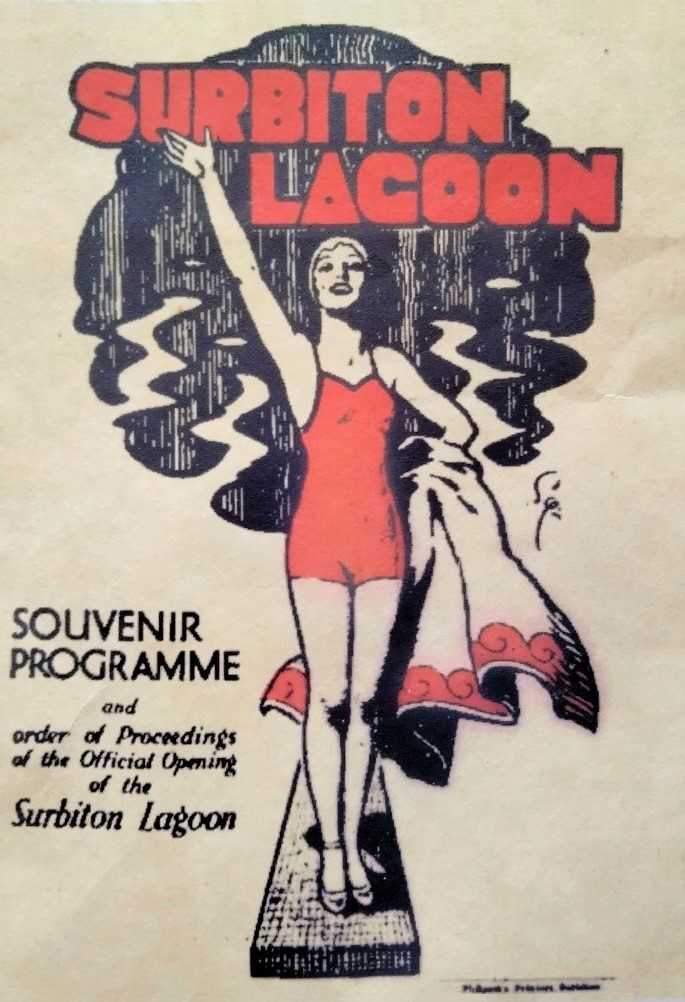
Souvenir programme cover, formal opening, May 1934

Location within Greater London

Surbiton Lagoon was an open air swimming pool located in Surbiton, London, England.

It opened in May 1934 though it had been open for business since April, and was situated in Raeburn Avenue in what was then the Surbiton Urban District of Surrey. It was situated on the 418 bus route of London Transport (London Country Buses from 1 January 1970), and near to Berrylands and Tolworth railway stations.

The lagoon complex was designed by the architect HT Mather. The pool had a maximum depth of 9 feet (2.7 m) and a minimum depth of 3 feet (0.91 m). It was 165 ft (50 m) x 90 ft (27 m) - a huge pool by any standards. The lagoon closed in 1979.

== Opening day ==
The opening ceremony was performed on a Wednesday evening in May 1934 by Mr. H.S. Durbin JP and featured many displays of swimming, including an appearance by Miss Ivy Hawke, the successful 1928 Channel swimmer, who lived locally. A water polo match was held, and the festivities went on into the evening.

== The Lagoon ==
The Lagoon was approached along a grass-lined entrance drive. On the other side of the road is a small stream, a tributary to the Hogsmill, and in front the whitewashed entrance with fittings picked out in bright blue paint. The photo shows the flats in Edith Gardens which are opposite where the Lagoon used to be.

As visitors entered the pool complex through a turnstile they were greeted by an ornamental fountain.

The pool had a full set of diving boards, both springboards and diving platforms at the deep end, and a simple tall slide. At the shallow end was a smaller slide suitable for children. Entry to the water was down a set of submerged stairs, an unusual design feature.

Along the right hand side of the pool was a set of sun terraces, concrete broad stairs with wooden boards on top. There was a lagoon café, and an ice cream booth. Separate ladies' and gentlemen's changing facilities, each with a children's section.

The pool was surrounded by a paved area, with the paving at the edge of the pool somewhat rough, making climbing out of the water without using the stairs an exfoliating experience. Though the water was heated, it was always a bracing experience to get in.

The lagoon had a holiday camp carefree atmosphere:

"Surbiton Lagoon was an awesome place to be in the summer in the 70s. The moment you got through the turnstiles and saw that big fountain you could feel the excitement. It had huge terraces where you could sunbathe all day, the pool was massive with a really deep, deep end, the girls looked great in their bikinis. Baywatch in Berrylands. I know, let's knock it down and build another really boring housing development on it. Yeah, that's much better. Not! Massive, massive shame it was closed down. A shame on Kingston council. I feel it is sorely missed!"
J Tait, New Malden

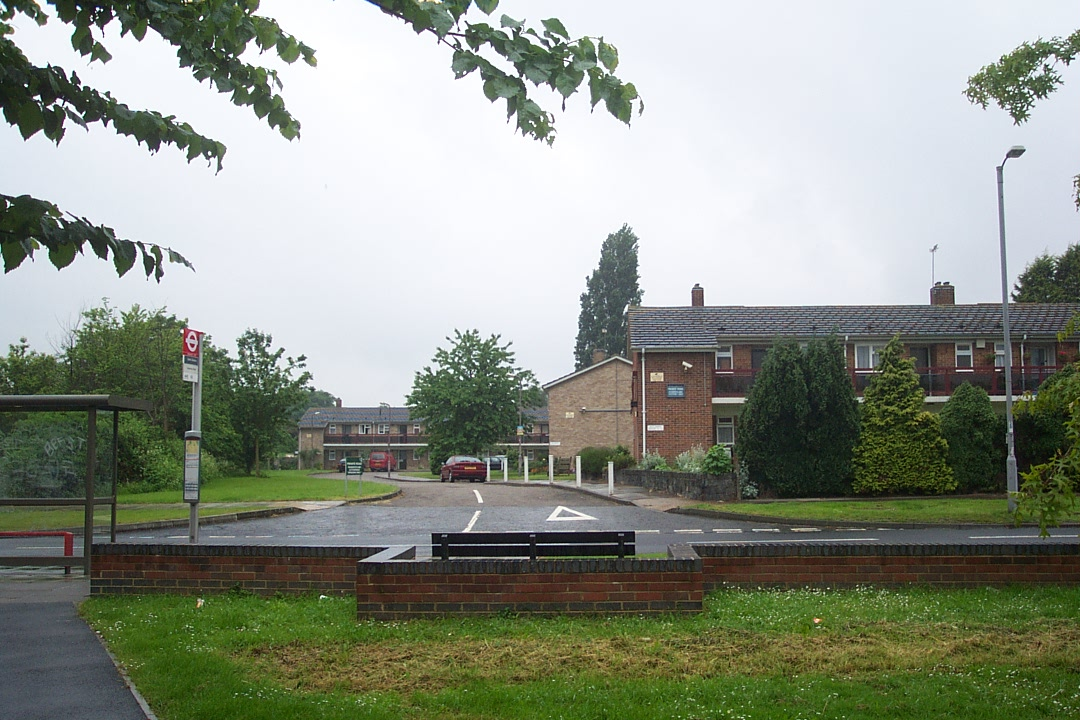
The site in 2006. No trace of the lagoon remains.

The pool closed in 1979 for repairs, and did not re-open after the council decided to build a new indoor pool, part-funded by selling off the site. The tennis courts are now covered by a housing estate, the lagoon itself has been landscaped.

The site was 20 acres, and the development cost was £18,000 in 1934.
