= Hanger Hill Wood =

Nature reserve in the London Borough of Ealing, England

Coordinates: 51.52471°N 0.29113°W

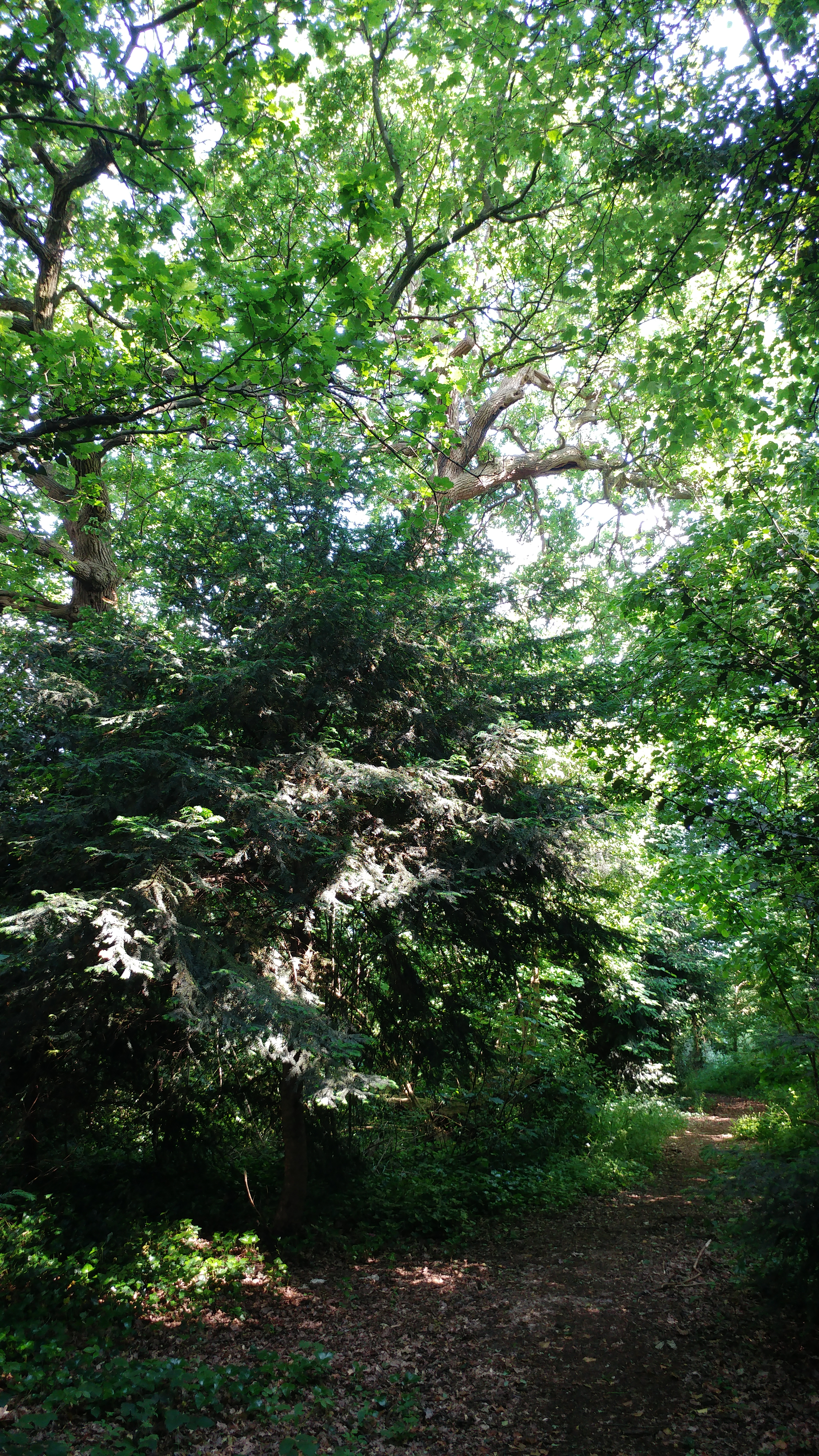
A path in the Hanger Hill Wood

Hanger Hill Wood is a small remnant of ancient woodland to the east of the Hanger Hill Park and North Circular Road at Hanger Lane, in Ealing in the London Borough of Ealing. Named from 'Hangra', the Old English word for wooded slope. There is access from Hanger Lane (at pedestrian crossing by Hillcrest Road), alternative access is at several points on Chatsworth Road.

== Wildlife ==
This site contains a variety of woodland native plants including Pedunculate oaks (Quercus robur), European beech (Fagus sylvatica), European yew (Taxus baccata), European holly (Ilex aquifolium), European ivy (Hedera helix) and other tree species.

Breeding birds include common wood pigeons (Columba palumbus), common blackbirds (Turdus merula), Eurasian blue tits (Cyanistes caeruleus), common starlings (Sturnus vulgaris) and invasive rose-ringed parakeets (Psittacula krameri).

Mammal species include red foxes (Vulpes vulpes), European hedgehogs (Erinaceus europaeus), invasive grey squirrels (Sciurus carolinensis).

== See also ==
- Fox Wood
