= Hogsmill River Park =

Park in London, England

Coordinates: 51.3892°N 0.2708°W

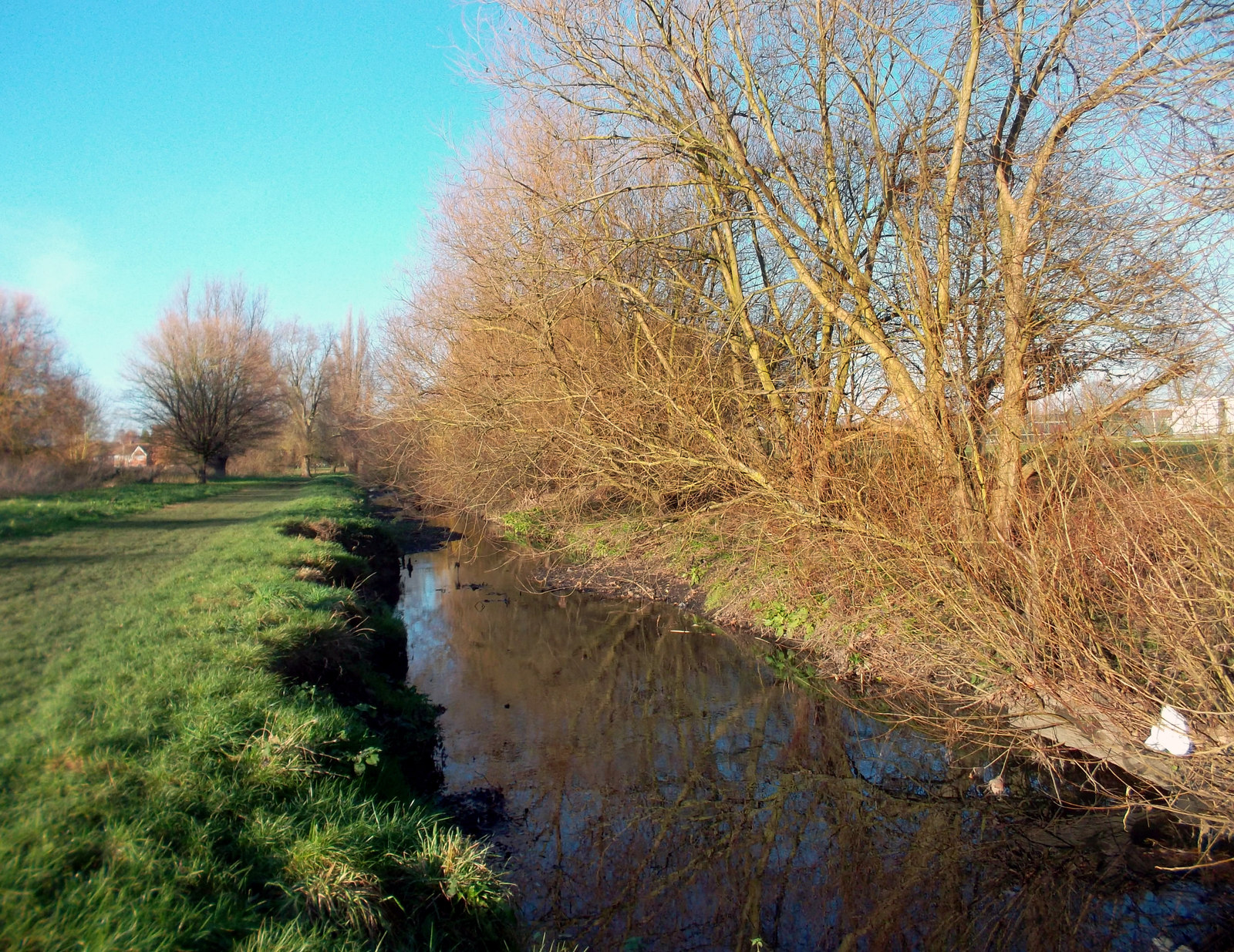
Elmbridge Open Space, part of the Hogsmill River Park

Hogsmill River Park or Hogsmill Valley is a 32.9 hectare linear park along the banks of the Hogsmill River in the Royal Borough of Kingston upon Thames in London. It stretches from the railway line near Berrylands station in the north to Old Malden Lane in Old Malden, on the edge of Kingston borough, in the south.

Most of the site is grassland, which has a rich variety of wildlife, including locally unusual plants such as grass vetchling, devil's-bit scabious and pepper-saxifrage. Birds which breed on the site include bullfinch, spotted flycatcher, lesser spotted woodpecker.

The site is a Site of Borough Importance for Nature Conservation, Grade 1. It contains four Local Nature Reserves (LNRs): Rose Walk, Elmbridge Open Space, Hogsmill Wood (closed to the public) and, south of the Kingston Bypass, Southwood Open Space.

The London Loop walk goes through the park.
