= Rose Walk =

Nature reserve in London

Coordinates: 51.3984°N 0.27786°W

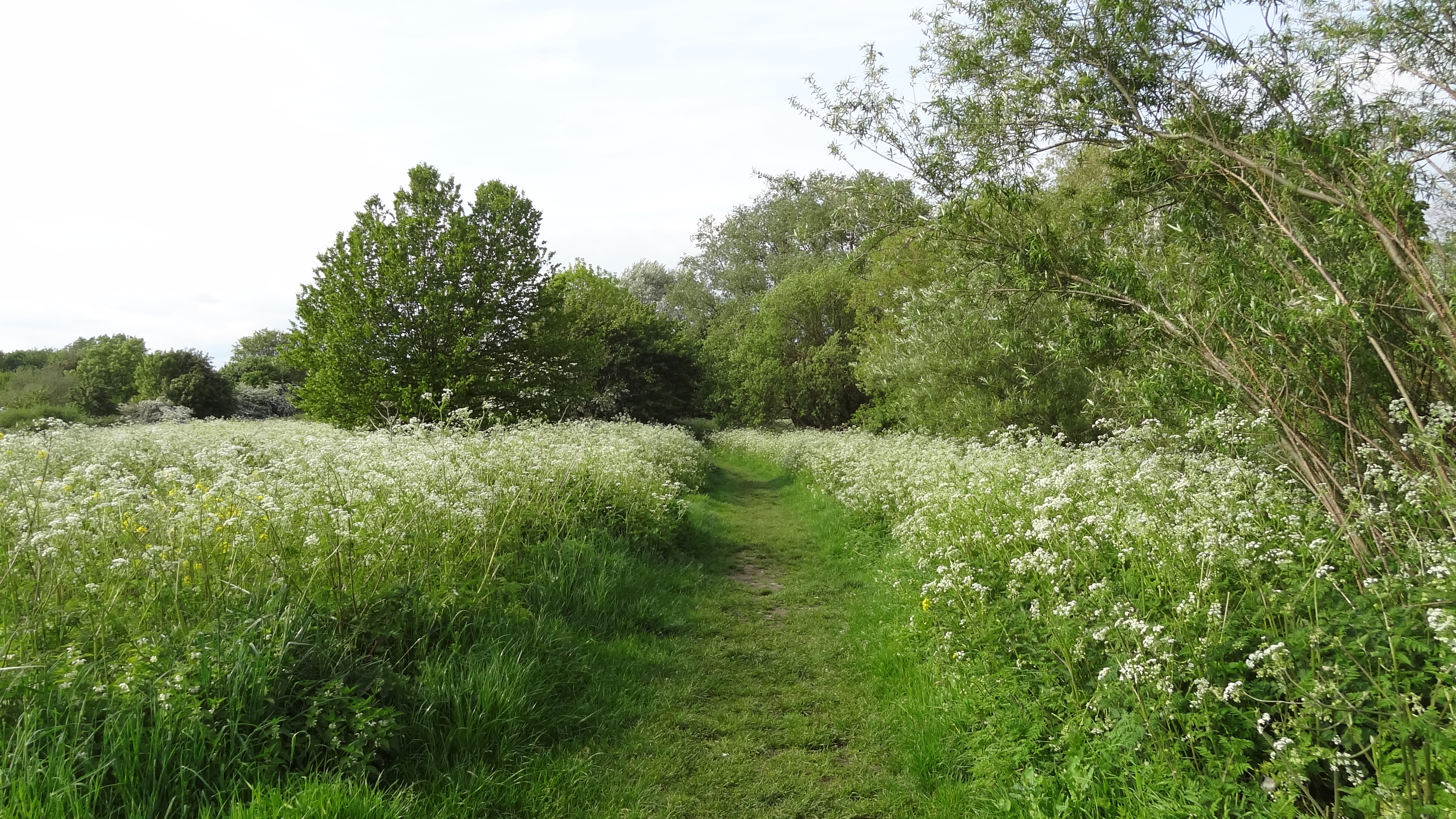

Rose Walk is a 2.7 hectare Local Nature Reserve in Berrylands in the Royal Borough of Kingston upon Thames in London. It is also part of the Hogsmill Valley Site of Borough Importance for Nature Conservation, Grade 1.

The site is unmanaged grassland with scattered wild flowers. The main grasses are oat grass, tall fescue and rye-grass. It is located at the northern end of the Hogsmill River Park, south of the Waterloo to Surbiton railway line, west of the Hogsmill River and north of Elmbridge Open Space. There is foot access at the junction of Surbiton Hill Park and Elmbridge Avenue.
