= Ivy Hawke =

British swimmer (1903–1970)

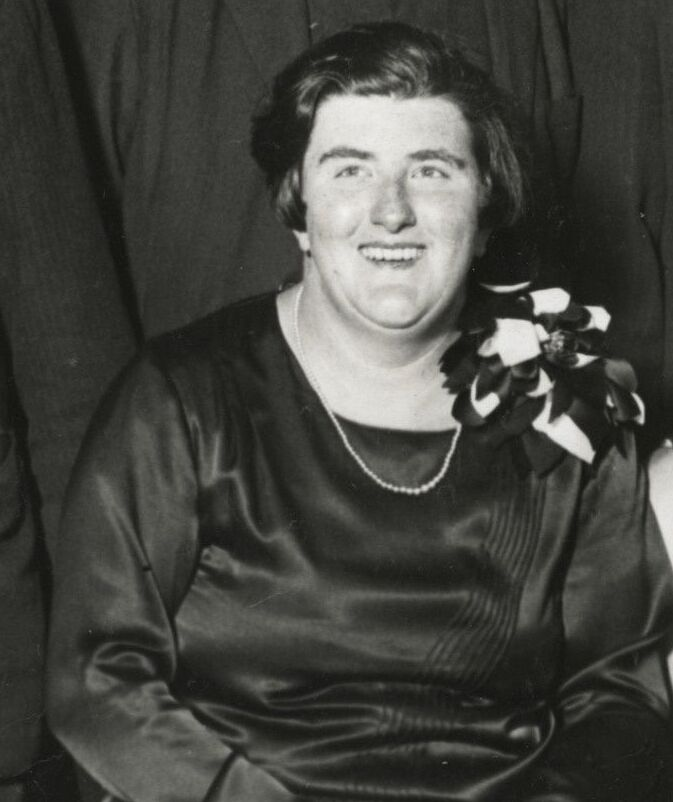
- Ivy Hawke in 1928
- Born: 12 April 1903
- Died: 1970 (aged 66–67); Kingston upon Thames, England, United Kingdom
- Occupation: Swimming instructor
- Known for: Swimming the English Channel

Ivy Hawke (12 April 1903 – 1970) was a British swimmer, swimming instructor, and the fourteenth person to successfully swim across the English Channel.

== Early life and career ==
Hawke was born on 12 April 1903 and lived in Surbiton. Her father, Charles Hawke, was a carpenter and her mother, Emma Hawke, ran the Spread Eagle Coffee Tavern in Surbiton. Hawke first aspired to swim the Channel aged 11. Her mother told the Sheffield Independent in 1928 "I think she first decided that she was going to swim the Channel when she had done a very good swim in the river here [in Surbiton] some time ago. She had a letter from Jabez Wolffe asking her why she stopped at river swimming and telling her to have a shot at the Channel."

In 1917, Hawke won the Thames Race aged 14. She won the Surrey Ladies' Swimming Club long-distance swimming competitions in the Thames three times in succession. Much of her early swimming experience was at the Old Tiffinians' School Swimming Club. Hawke worked at the Spread Eagle Coffee Tavern with her mother and was a swimming instructor for the London County Council.

== Channel-crossing attempts ==
Ivy Hawke in 1922, aged 19, during a trial swim in Dover in preparation for crossing the English Channel

Hawke made her first attempt at crossing the Channel in 1922 when she was 19. She started the crossing from Dover but had to withdraw due to rough seas. In total, she swam 17 miles in four and a half hours. Hawke's next attempt in 1927 was made at the same time as five other people. She was forced to quit after 10 hours in the water. All of the other participants were also forced to abandon their attempts due to poor weather and illness.

Hawke's third attempt at crossing the Channel was in 1928 when she was aged 25. She became the first successful Channel swimmer of 1928 and the 14th person to ever swim the Channel. Hawke was seen off by the Mayor and Mayoress of Calais, with Hawke reporting that the Mayor "wrote in my autograph book that he hoped I would vindicate the honour of English women swimmers, and after that I was absolutely determined to do it." During the crossing she was accompanied by Bill Burgess and her manager Joe Costa in a boat. She entered the Channel at Cap Gris-Nez at 9:59pm on Saturday 18 August and arrived at Hope Point, between Kingsdown and St Margaret's at Cliffe, at 5:15pm the next day. She was greeted by a crowd of hundreds upon her arrival. At the time, her swim was the longest duration of a successful Channel-crossing. Hawke was reported to be the fifth woman to successfully swim the Channel.

Hawke made another attempt on 31 August 1929 to swim to France from Dover, aiming to be the first person to swim the Channel from both sides. In preparation, she trained at Deal with her pilot Captain Harry Pearson and Gladys Wiggens, captain of Surrey Ladies' Swimming Club. Hawke entered the water at 9:17pm at South Foreland. She was forced to withdraw from the attempt at 1:17am after 16 hours due to heavy waves and fatigue. She was less than three miles from the French coast. After abandoning the attempt she stated "If Captain Pearson had not made me give up I would have carried on till I sank." It was reported that this unsuccessful attempted demonstrated the difficulty in swimming from England to France compared to in the opposite direction.

Channel-crossing attempts and times
Date	Direction	Time	Success/fail
8 September 1922	France to England	04:30 hours	Fail
30 August 1927	France to England	07:00 hours	Fail
19 August 1928	France to England	19:16 hours	Success
31 August 1929	England to France	16:00 hours	Fail

== Personal life ==
Hawke was a friend and member of the Women's Freedom League. She married Edward Crocker, a coal merchant, in Surbiton in September 1931. In 1934, Hawke was part of a display marking the opening of Surbiton Lagoon.

== See also ==
- List of successful English Channel swimmers
