= Shoulder of Mutton Green =

Public open space in Welling, London, England

Coordinates: 51°27′57″N 0°05′34″E

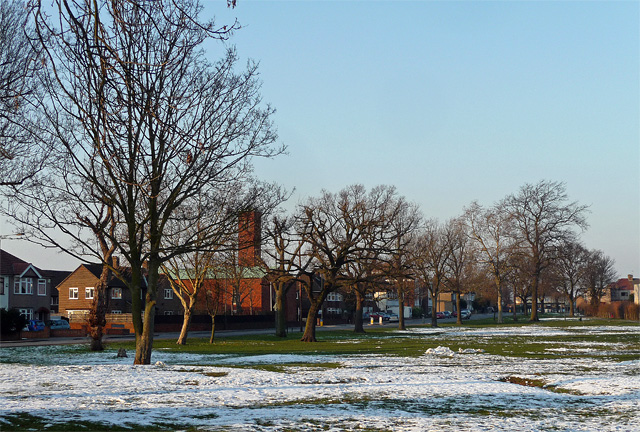
Shoulder of Mutton Green

Shoulder of Mutton Green is a public open space in Welling in the London Borough of Bexley. It lies between Wickham Street and Bellegrove Road, which is part of the old London to Dover Road. It owes its unusual name to its triangular shape.

== History ==
Before the urban growth of the nearby hamlet of Welling in the early 20th century, Shoulder of Mutton Green was surrounded by fields. During World War II the green was the location of a large public air raid shelter, part of the entrance of which is still visible near the bus stop on Bellegrove Road.

The park sits on London clay, which frequently causes instances of flooding over the green.
