= Parks and open spaces in the London Borough of Hackney =

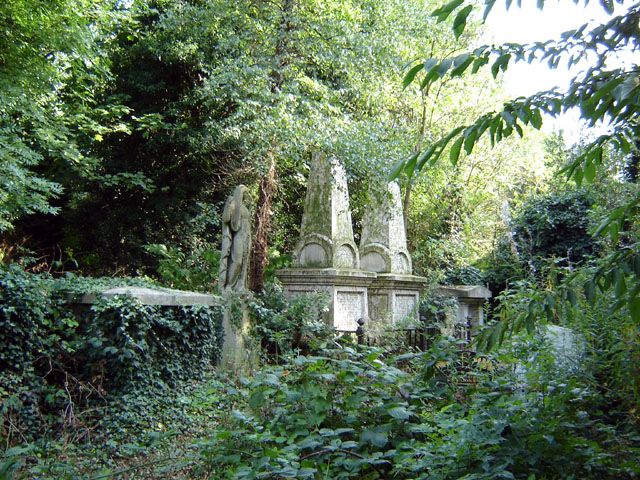
Abney Park Cemetery is now a nature reserve

The London Borough of Hackney, one of the inner London boroughs, has 62 parks, gardens and open spaces within its boundaries, totalling 330 ha. These provide the "green lungs" for leisure activities. Hackney Marshes contain the largest concentration of football pitches in Europe.

In July 2008, seven Hackney parks won Green Flag awards for Clissold, Springfield, Haggerston and Shoreditch parks, together with London Fields, St John's churchyard and Hackney Downs. St John's was also awarded 'Heritage Green Status'. However, by contrast, Abney Park in Hackney was included in the Heritage at Risk Register in 2009 as one of Britain's historic parks and gardens at risk from neglect and decay.

== Principal open spaces ==
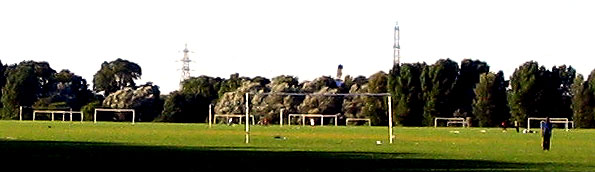
Hackney Marshes holds the world record for the highest number (88) of full-sized football pitches in one place.

Apart from smaller green areas such as sports grounds and smaller gardens, the following are the major open spaces in the Borough:

- Abney Park Cemetery (local nature reserve) – 12.53 hectares (31 acres)
- Clapton Common – 2.58 hectares (6.4 acres)
- Clissold Park – (22.57 hectares (55.8 acres))
- Hackney Downs – 16 hectares (40 acres)
- Hackney Marshes – 138 hectares (340 acres)
- Haggerston Park – 6 hectares (15 acres)
- London Fields - 12.65 hectares (31.3 acres)
- Millfields (North and South)
- Shoreditch Park – 7.7 hectares (19 acres)
- Springfield Park (local nature reserve) – 16 hectares (40 acres)
- Stoke Newington Common – 2.15 hectares (5.3 acres).
- Victoria Park is an 88-hectare (220-acre) park, bordering on South Hackney, in the adjacent London Borough of Tower Hamlets.
- Newington Green- 2 hectares (4.9 acres)
- Well Street Common – 8.66 hectares (21.4 acres).

== Water ==
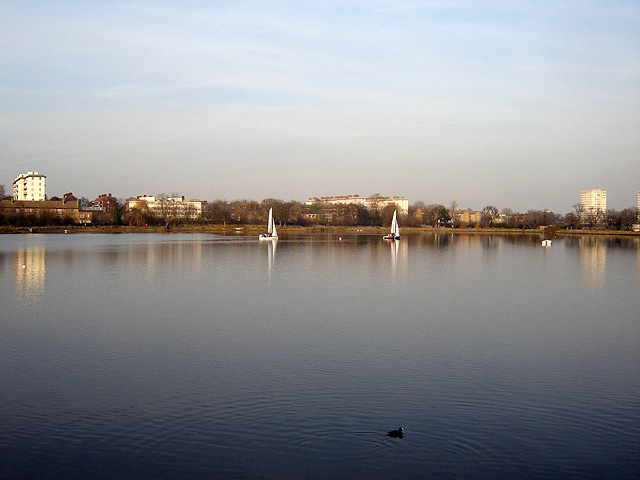
Stoke Newington West reservoir, looking north.

In the north of the Borough there are the two reservoirs (West and East) at Stoke Newington.

The River Lee forms the eastern boundary of the borough. The towpath is suitable for walking and cyclists. It can be readily accessed from many places, and provides access to Hackney Marshes and the Lee Valley Park.

The Regent's Canal and the man-made New River also pass through the borough. Towards the east, the Regent's Canal exits the borough into the London Borough of Tower Hamlets, it then meets the Hertford Union Canal, which forms the southern boundary of Victoria Park, running to join the River Lee Navigation at Old Ford lock. The Regent canal turns south, and meets the River Thames at Limehouse Basin. On the west, the Regents canal passes near Broadway Market, then into the London Borough of Islington eventually entering the Islington Tunnel, which is not accessible to pedestrians, or cyclists.

== City farms ==
- Hackney City Farm
