= Castle Hill, Chessington =

Nature reserve in London, England

Coordinates: 51.3581°N 0.29086°W

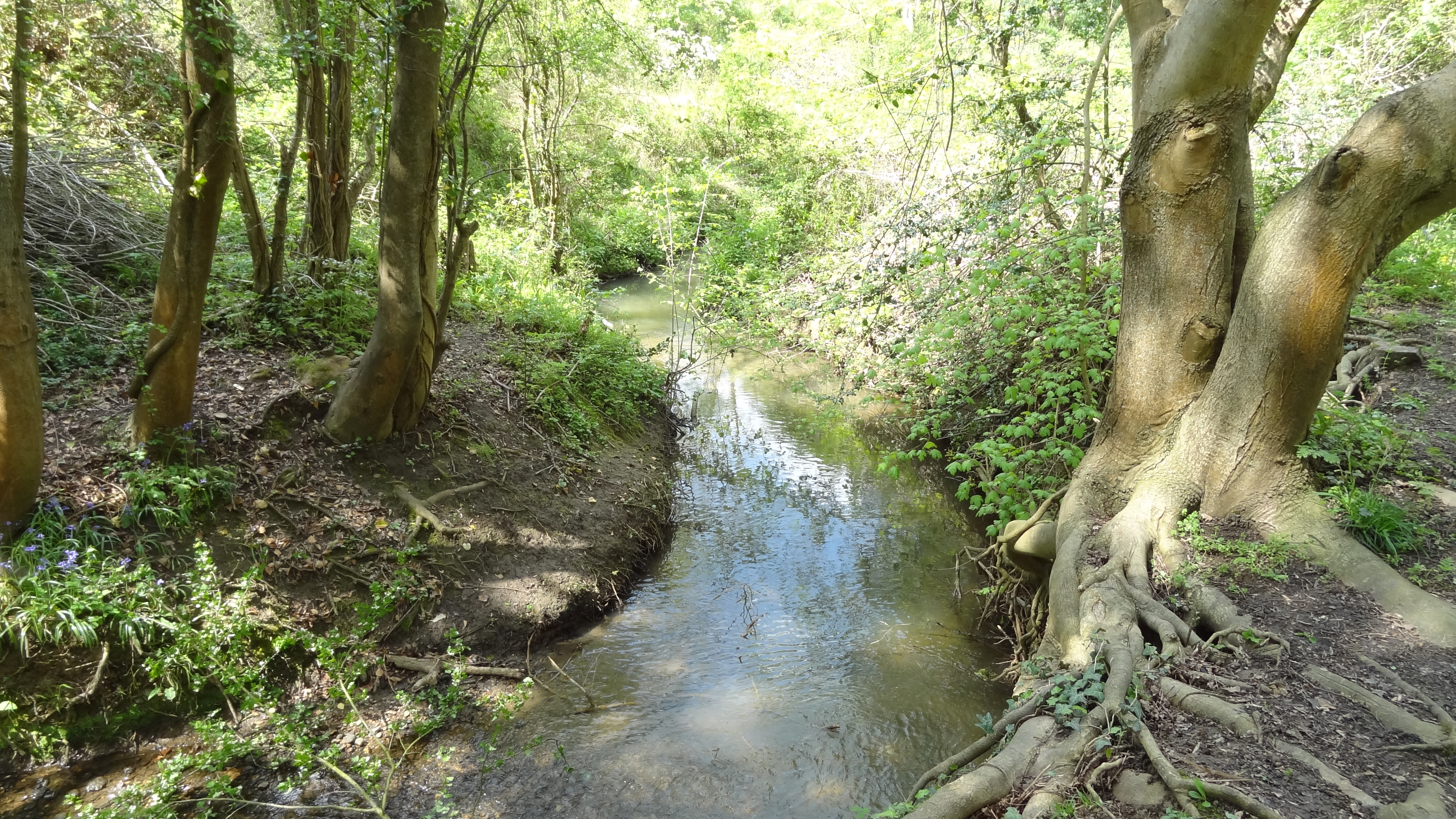
Bonesgate Stream in Castle Hill

Castle Hill is a 3.5-hectare (8.6-acre) scheduled monument, local nature reserve and Site of Borough Importance for Nature Conservation, Grade 1, in Chessington in the Royal Borough of Kingston upon Thames, London. It is owned by Merton College, Oxford, and leased to Kingston Council. The site is managed by the Lower Mole Countryside Management Project.

The site is at the end of a deer park owned by Merton College, and it has earthworks which were probably formerly a medieval hunting lodge. The Bonesgate Stream runs along the western edge. The long-established woodland is mainly oak and hazel, and the varied ground flora include bluebell, wood anemone and wood sedge. There are breeding birds such as jay, great spotted woodpecker and song thrush.

There is access from Filby Road. Bonesgate Open Space is immediately north, and Horton Country Park in Surrey to the east.
