= Edith Gardens =

Nature reserve in London, England

Coordinates: 51.3885°N 0.28398°W

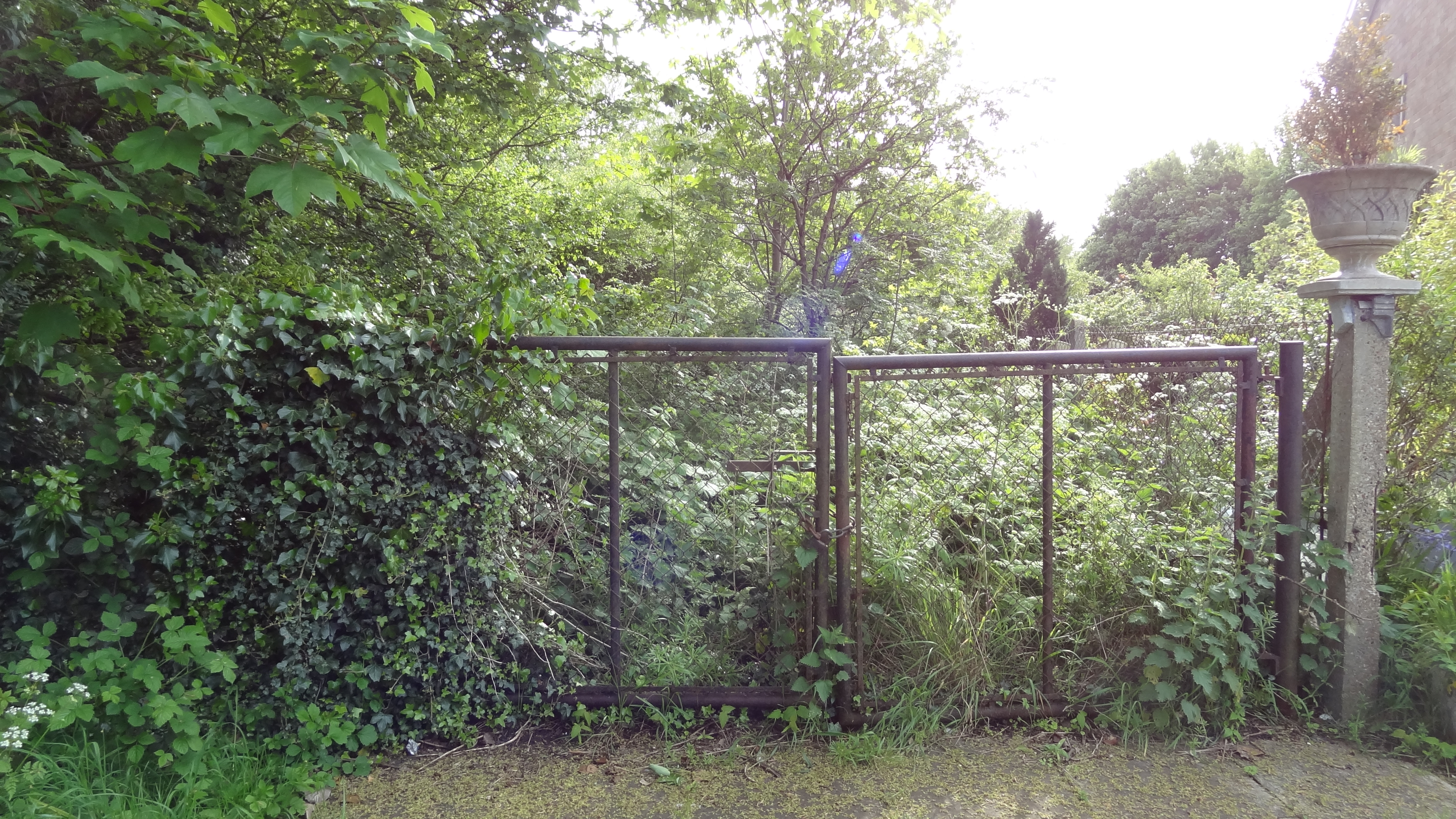
The locked entrance to Edith Gardens

Edith Gardens is a 0.44 hectares (1.1 acres) Local Nature Reserve and Site of Local Importance for Nature Conservation in Berrylands in the Royal Borough of Kingston upon Thames in London. It was designated in 1992.

The site is abandoned allotments next to Tolworth Brook. The stream is of low wildlife value as it is in culvert with no vegetation. There is a dense thicket of elms and a trip next to the brook which has mature oak, ash and sycamore trees. Most of the site is grassland dominated by oat grass and cock's foot.

The entrance in the road called Edith Gardens, off Raeburn Avenue, is kept locked and there is no public access.

As of spring 2021, the social enterprise organization, Citizen Zoo, is working to transform Edith Gardens into a small nature reserve, particularly for people with disabilities to help them engage with nature.
