= Fox Wood =

Nature reserve in Ealing, London

Coordinates: 51.5264°N 0.2990°W

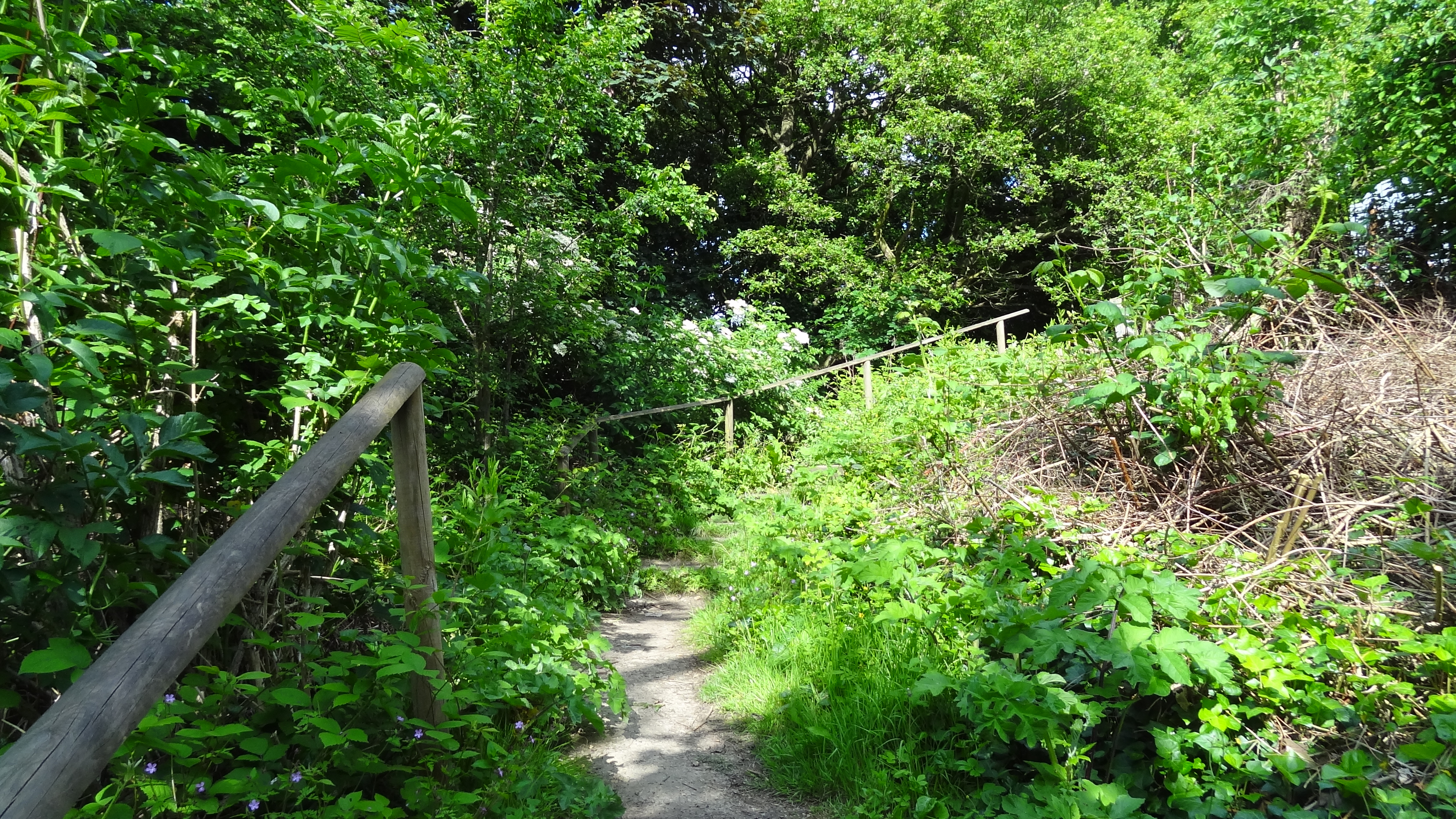

Fox Wood is a 2.25 hectare Local Nature Reserve and Site of Borough Importance for Nature Conservation, Grade 1, in Ealing in the London Borough of Ealing. It is owned and managed by Ealing Council.

The site was part of Fox Reservoir, which was opened in 1888 and drained in 1943 to prevent it being used as a navigational aid for German bombers in World War II. The area was acquired by the Municipal Borough of Ealing in 1949 for public open space. Part of it is ancient woodland, and other areas are on the sloping area of the drained reservoir. It has a variety of plant species, including wood anemones, wood avens and garlic mustard.

There is access from Hillcrest Road, Fox Lane and Sandall Road.
