= Tolworth Court Farm Fields =

UK nature reserve

Coordinates: 51.371°N 0.279°W

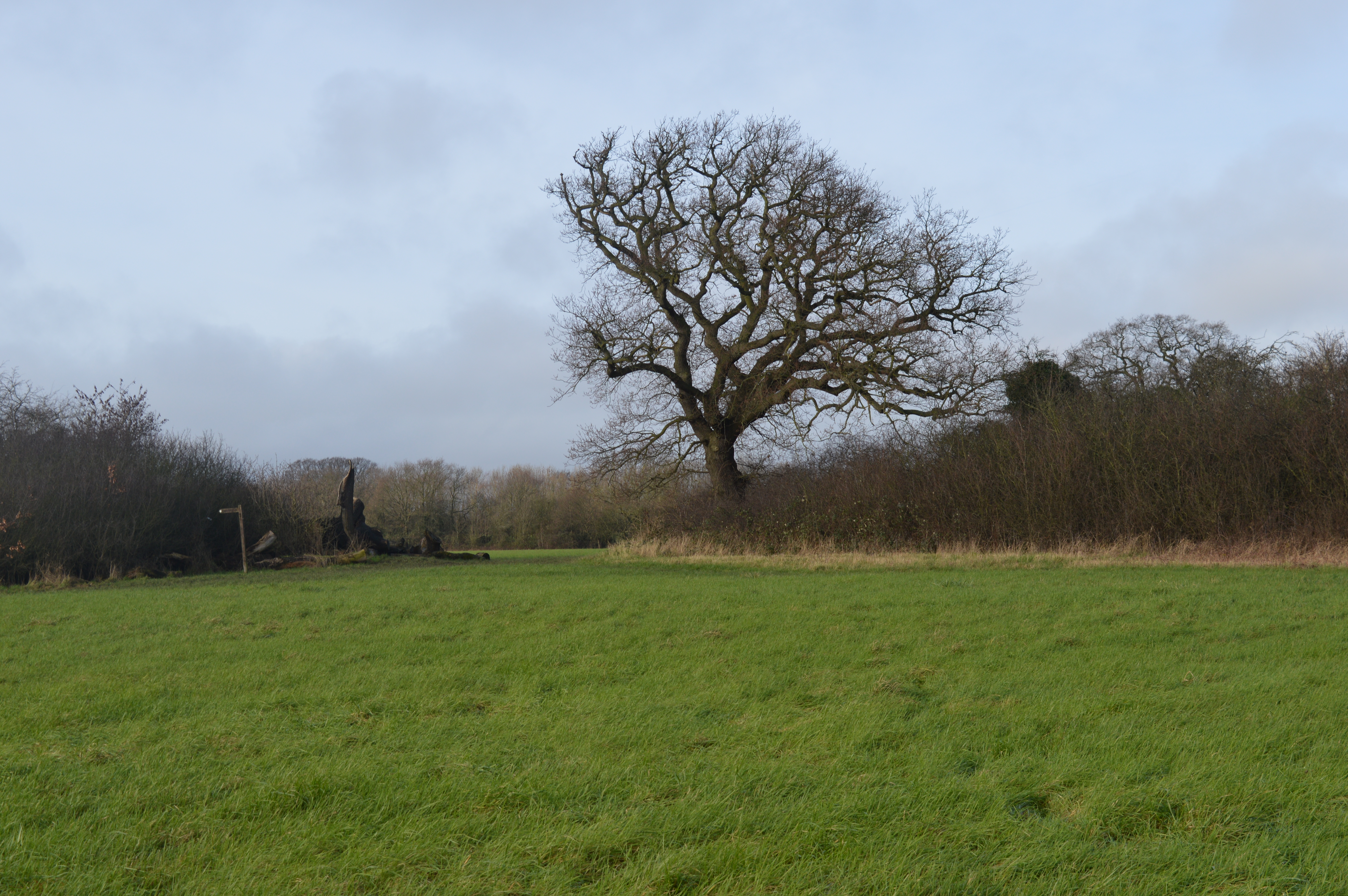

Tolworth Court Farm Fields is a 43.3 hectare (107 acre) Local Nature Reserve (LNR) in Tolworth in the Royal Borough of Kingston, London. It was designated an LNR in 2004 due to its historical and ecological significance.

The site has been farmed since Domesday Book in the eleventh century, and it was probably part of a high status manor in the Middle Ages. The hedgerows show signs of a ditch and bank next to them, and this together with ancient trees suggests that the hedges and layout of the fields pre-date the late 18th century inclosure acts. The landscape has changed little in the last 150 years. The fields are currently managed as neutral hay meadows. The northern field is damp and has plants typical of periodically waterlogged fields, such as creeping bent and marsh foxtail.

Mammals on the site include woodmice, field voles and roe deer. The wildlife has increased considerably over the years, it is regularly visited by little egrets, herons love the water and the waterlogged field for frogs and lizards. There are several pairs of kestrels, sparrowhawks can be seen working the trees. A pair of buzzards, and red kites have been seen on a regular basis. A trip over the fields late in the evening will reward with several tawny owls calling to each other, and numerous bats flying around. There is a very large array of butterflies and moths. There is access from Kingston Road, Jubilee Way, both parts of Cox Lane and the fields to the south-west.
