= Elmbridge Open Space =

Nature reserve in London

Coordinates: 51.392726°N 0.27385°W

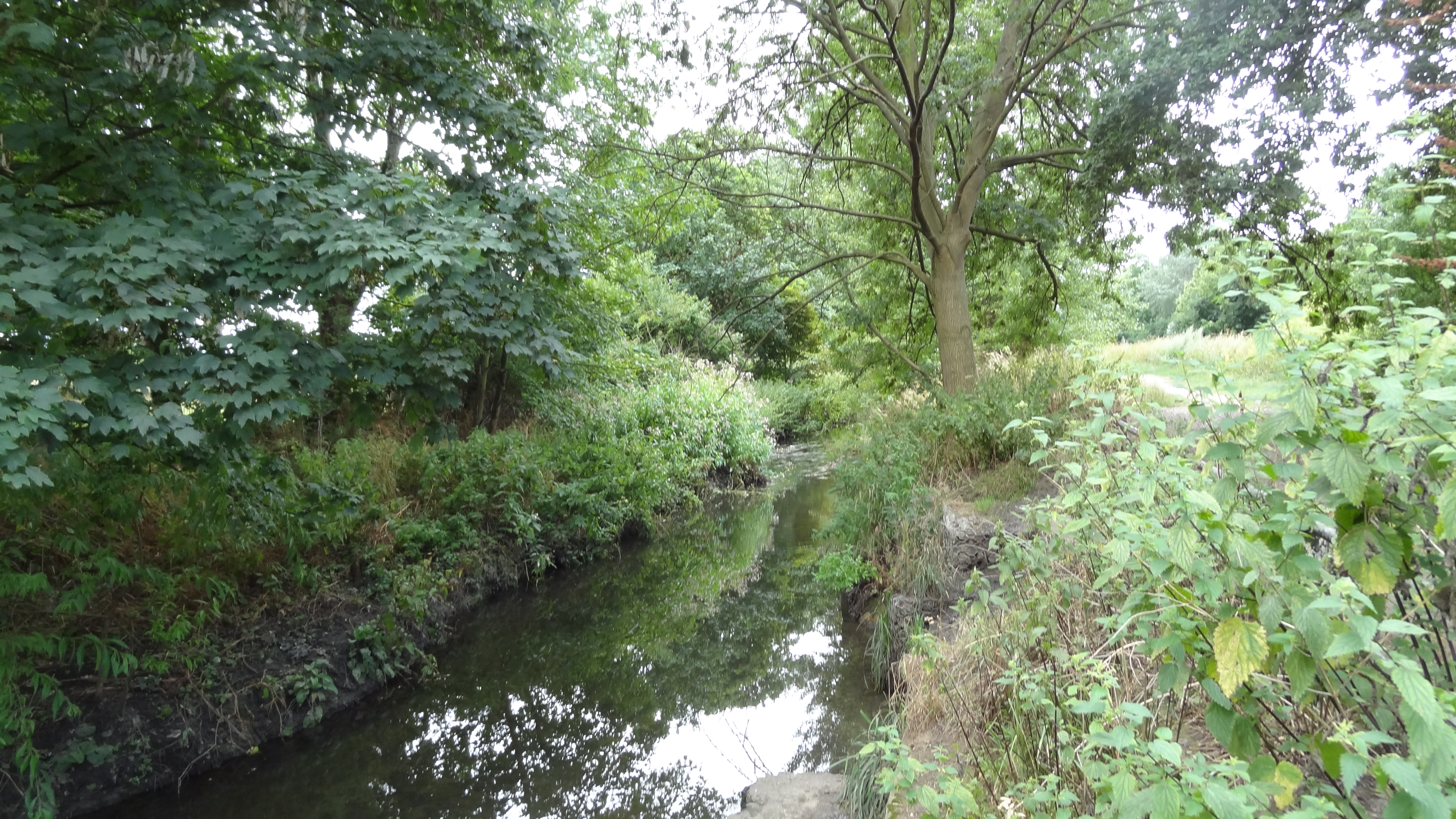
Hogsmill River in Elmbridge Open Space

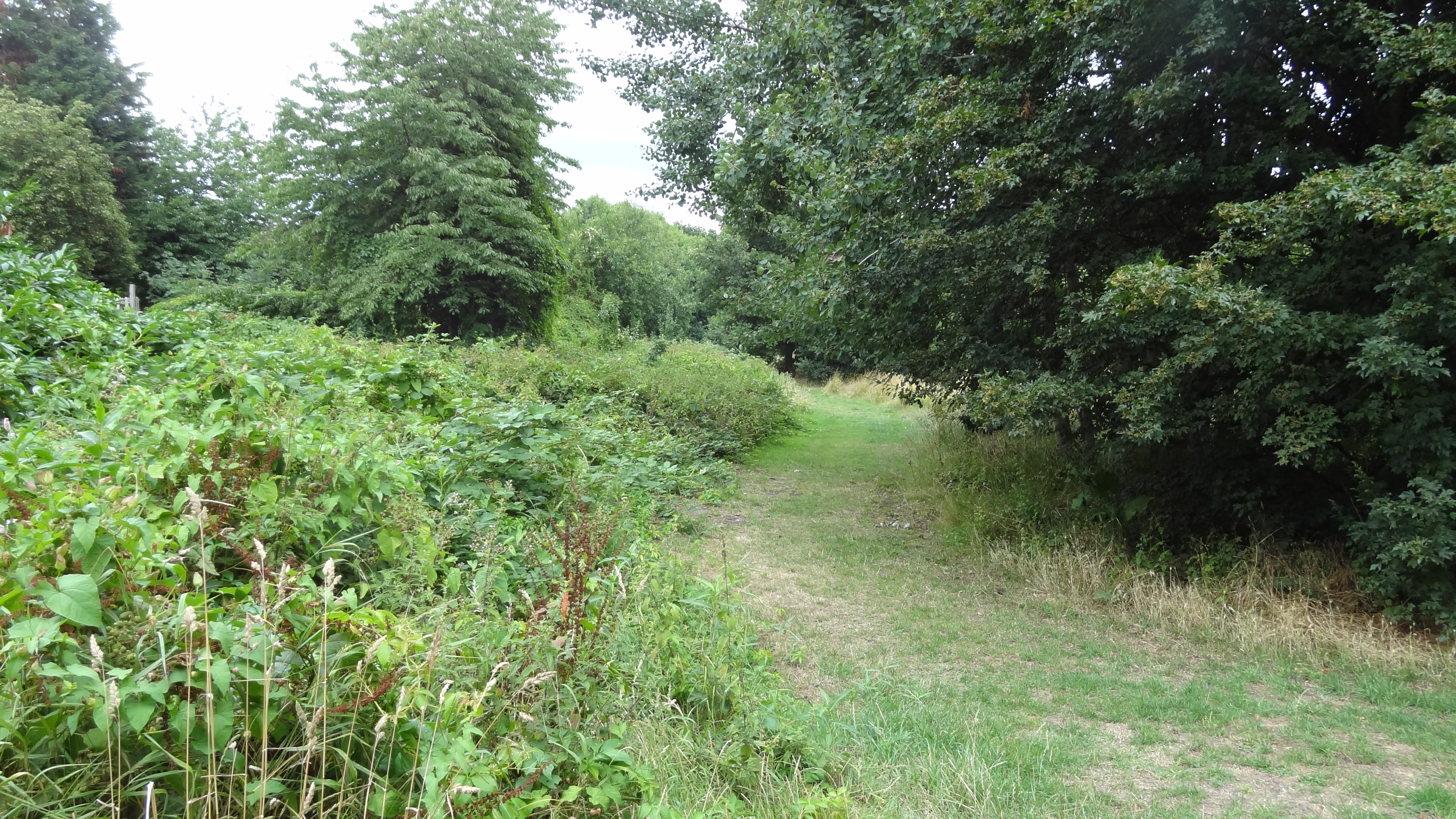
Path in Elmbridge Open Space

Elmbridge Open Space or Elmbridge Meadows is a Local Nature Reserve (LNR) in Berrylands in the Royal Borough of Kingston upon Thames in London. It is a linear open space along the western bank of the Hogsmill River which starts at Malden Way on the Kingston Bypass in the south and ends at a path between Surbiton Hill Park and Green Lane in the north .

The open space is a part of the Hogsmill River Park and the Hogsmill Valley Site of Borough Importance for Nature Conservation, Grade I.

It is adjacent to the Hogsmill Wood Local Nature Reserve, a small area of closed woodland situated immediately east of the Hogsmill and north of the Malden Way.

The London Loop long-distance walk passes through the site.
