= Hogsmill River =

River in Surrey and Greater London, England

Hogsmill
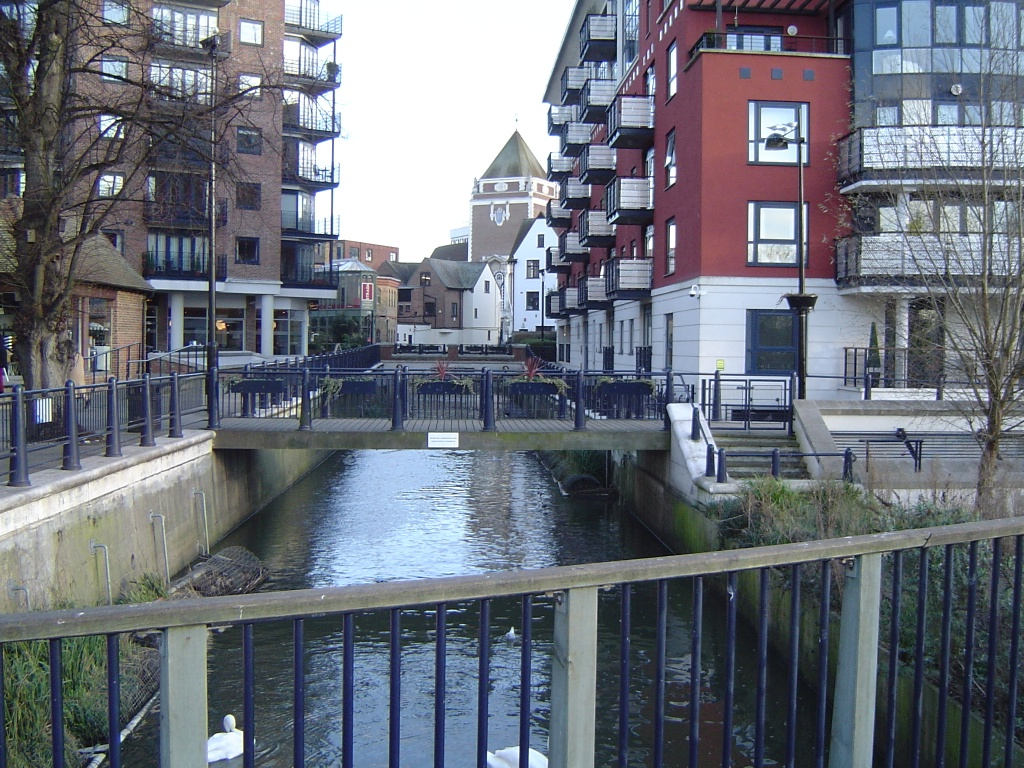
- The Hogsmill at Kingston as it flows into the Thames

- Location of the mouth in Greater London

Location
- Country: England
- Counties: Surrey, Greater London
- Districts / Boroughs: Epsom and Ewell, Royal Borough of Kingston upon Thames
- Towns: Ewell, Old Malden, Berrylands, Kingston upon Thames

Physical characteristics
- Source: Bourne Hall Park
  - location: Ewell, Surrey
  - coordinates: 51°21′01″N 0°15′03″W
- Mouth: River Thames
  - location: Kingston upon Thames
  - coordinates: 51°24′33″N 0°18′30″W
- Length: 9.9 km (6.2 mi)
- Basin size: 73 km^{2} (28 sq mi)
- Discharge
  - location: Kingston upon Thames
  - average: 0.98 m^{3}/s (35 cu ft/s)
  - minimum: 0.33 m^{3}/s (12 cu ft/s)9 September 1976
  - maximum: 26.3 m^{3}/s (930 cu ft/s)6 August 1981
- Discharge
  - location: Ewell
  - average: 0.04 m^{3}/s (1.4 cu ft/s)

Basin features
- Progression: Hogsmill, Thames, North Sea
- Tributaries
  - left: Horton Stream, Bonesgate Stream, Green Lanes Stream, Tolworth Brook
  - right: Ewell Court Stream

The Hogsmill River in Surrey and Greater London, England, is a small chalk stream tributary of the River Thames. It rises in Ewell and flows into the Thames at Kingston upon Thames on the lowest non-tidal reach, that above Teddington Lock.

The river is 10 km (6 mi) long and has a catchment area of about 76 km^{2} (29 sq mi). Nearby land was formerly flood-meadows; following improvements it is now mostly sports grounds, a sewage treatment works and green space, save for Kingston and Epsom town centres. It is a habitat of many animals, fish and insects.

The 12th-century Clattern Bridge, one of the oldest road bridges in England, crosses the river in the southwest of Kingston town centre. The Coronation Stone, now sited close to the river in Kingston, is believed to have been used for the coronation of Saxon kings in the 10th century. It was used as a horse mounting block until 1850 when it was mounted on a plinth in the town centre.

The river has five tributaries: Green Lanes Stream, Ewell Court Stream, Horton Stream, Bonesgate Stream and Tolworth Brook.

== Course of the river ==
=== Epsom and Ewell ===
The source of the Hogsmill River is a chalk spring just outside Bourne Hall Park in Ewell, Surrey. It flows in a northerly direction between Kingston Road and the sports field beside the railway track. The Hogsmill passes the sites of the Lower and Upper Mills, and Ewell Court Mills, where gunpowder was produced in the 18th and 19th centuries, and gently bends to the left before flowing under the Mole Valley railway line between Ewell West and Stoneleigh at the start of the Hogsmill Open Space which follows the river until the borough boundary with Kingston.

The river continues its course in green space between the residential areas of Ewell Court and West Ewell and is joined by the Green Lanes Stream. After a short distance of green space, the river runs as a boundary between Poole Road Recreation Ground and Ewell Court Park and flows behind Ewell Athletics Track. It reaches another confluence, this one being with the Ewell Court Stream, flowing in just downstream from Ewell Court Lake as it continues into West Ewell.

The Hogsmill runs further through the open space and passes near West Ewell Infants School and Ruxley Church before flowing under Ruxley Farm Bridge, the site of the former Ruxley Splash. It passes Riverview Primary School in the residential area of Ruxley Ward before the confluence with the Bonesgate Stream, which here marks the boundary between the boroughs of Epsom and Ewell in Surrey and Kingston in Greater London. After the confluence, the Hogsmill bends to the right near Riverview Road and alongside the new wetlands at Tolworth Court Farm Fields and then continues as the boundary past Tolworth Court Bridge with the A240 (Kingston Road) to the junction with the B284 (Worcester Park Road).

=== Kingston ===
The river flows beside Worcester Park Road and Old Malden Lane (both the B284) along the edge of a few sports grounds and under the entrance to the Surbiton Raceway go-karting track. The river leaves the boundary as it turns left into the outskirts of Old Malden in an area of woodland and green space. It crosses the Chessington branch railway line a short distance away from Malden Manor railway station. The Hogsmill is now flowing in a NNW direction as it crosses the A3 between Tolworth and Malden junctions.

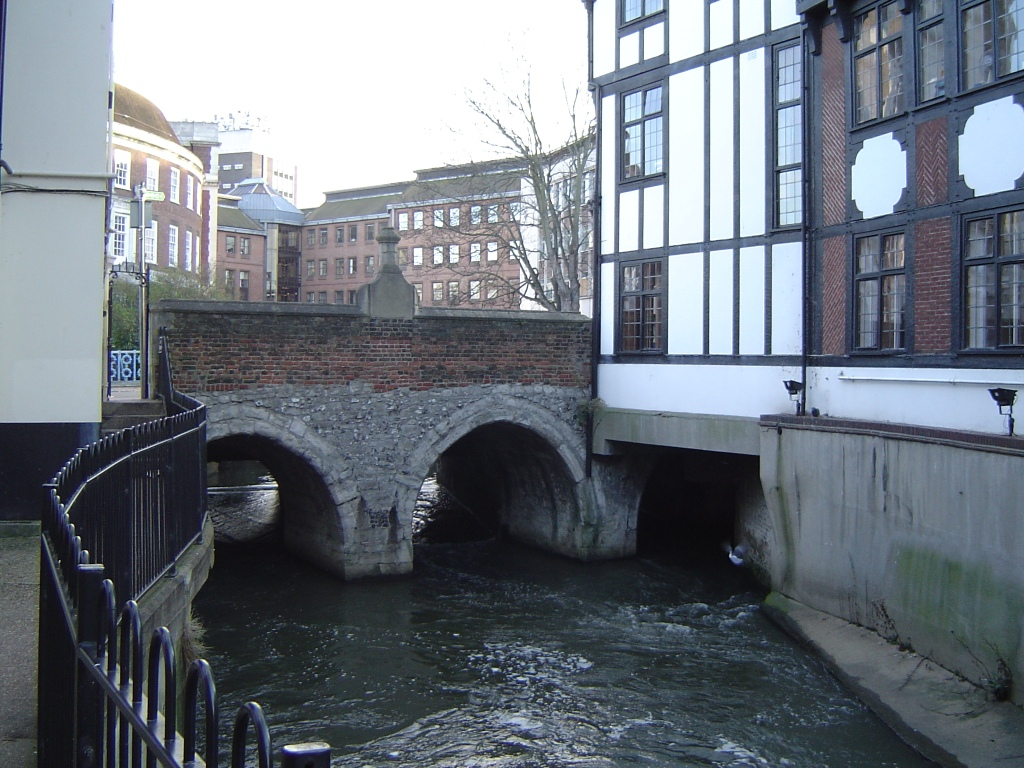
The Hogsmill flowing under the Clattern Bridge in Kingston. One of the oldest in Surrey, being mentioned in 1293 as "Clateryngbrugge".

The river delimits New Malden (historically the bulk of "Malden") and Berrylands (historically part of Kingston), beside sport and recreation grounds near Elmbridge Avenue, where it is joined by Tolworth Brook, after which it passes under the South Western main railway line near Berrylands railway station. The Hogsmill leaves the green space area at the railway line and passes Kingsmeadow, Kingston Cemetery and sewage works in the eastern outskirts of Kingston upon Thames, which covers not only that borough but also Epsom and Ewell which had a large sewage farm against the river in the decades around 1900.

It crosses under Villiers Road before heading alongside the Kingston School of Art campus of Kingston University and through the Middle Mill Hall of Residence site. It then crosses Springfield Road beside Denmark Road and Grange Road. It also runs under the bridge for the A307 (Wheatfield Way) near College Roundabout beside Kingston College. The river then runs under St. James's Road by the Magistrates Court and the Guildhall before flowing under Kingston High Street and Wadbrook Street. The Hogsmill River meets the Thames beside a restaurant and street and promenade of shops beside the Thames Path footbridge at grid reference TQ177691, just upstream of Kingston Bridge.

== Tributaries ==
=== Green Lanes Stream ===
The Green Lanes Stream is 2.1 miles (3.4 km) long and starts as a run-off from Stamford Green Pond on the eastern edge of Epsom Common. Other smaller streams from the common join the main stream a few metres from the pond as it goes underground. It runs near Manor Green Road and is above the ground in places, for example by the bridges under Christ Church Mount (a crescent road off Manor Green Road). Shortly afterwards, it flows underground again and this is where it runs under Epsom Primary School on Hook Road at the junction with Longmead Road. This is where the stream comes above the ground.

It runs parallel with Longmead Road where it runs near to Longmead Industrial Estate and Blenheim High School until the road meets the B2200 (Chessington Road) and the stream runs under it. This is where it flows between the two roads named Green Lanes (the river is named after the roads). It runs into the Hogsmill Open Space before meeting the confluence with Hogsmill Stream.

=== Ewell Court Stream ===
Ewell Court Stream is 1.7 miles (2.7 km) long and starts near a pond on the edge of Nonsuch Park by the A24 (London Road) in Stoneleigh. After running under the A24, it continues under Briarwood Road. It is visible again briefly in an alley near Stoneleigh railway station. The stream bends left under Stoneleigh Park Road and runs under Walsingham Gardens and the A240 (Kingston Road) where it enters Ewell Court. After running after Preston Drive, it enters Ewell Court Park and comes above ground before running through Ewell Court Lake.

As it continues through the park towards the meeting point with the Hogsmill it passes the Packhorse Bridge, which was named after the mules that regularly transported gunpowder from the mills, across the river and into a brick magazine. At its height in the mid-19th century, the gunpowder mill complex by the bridge employed 156 men. Gunpowder from Ewell is said to have been used in the American Civil War.

=== Bonesgate Stream ===
The Bonesgate Stream is the principal stream of the Hogsmill River. It is 3 miles (5 km) in length and rises in Malden Rushett near the crossroads of the A243 and B280. It flows in a NE direction through farmlands before flowing just east of Chessington. After crossing under Filby Road, it heads past the Bonesgate pub, now called the William Bourne, in Moor Lane on the eastern edge of Chessington. The bridge over the stream is where Moor Lane and Chessington Road meet. The river then heads through open space, flowing under a bridge near Cox Lane Community Centre. The river goes past the edge of the Cox Lane Estate shortly before joining the Hogsmill by Tolworth Court Bridge under the A240 Kingston Road. From the William Bourne pub to Tolworth Court Bridge, the river serves as a boundary between West Ewell (Surrey) and Chessington (Greater London).

=== Horton Stream ===
The source of Horton Stream is in the centre of Horton Country Park, Epsom. It is 3.3 miles (5.3 km) long and its source is near West Park Hospital beside Horton Lane, Epsom. The stream carries on parallel with Horton Lane as it passes near to West Park Farm and Horton Park Farm. After travelling through Horton Country Park, it heads through Horton Golf Course before crossing Chessington Road, West Ewell. It runs alongside Chessington Close before running through the playing fields of Epsom and Ewell High School. It continues behind Scotts Farm Road before the confluence with the Hogsmill near Ruxley Lane after running under Scotts Farm Road.

=== Tolworth Brook ===
At 3.75 miles (6.0 km), Tolworth Brook (or Surbiton Stream) is the longest tributary. Its source is on the edge of Claygate from springs at Grapesome Wood on the west side of the A3.

It flows under the A3 to skirt Lovelace Primary School, north under Clayton Road between the withy bed and Oaklands Close, then through rugby playing fields and crosses the A309 Esher bypass going north between allotments and Kelvin Grove. It then passes west of Gladstone and Brook Roads through playing fields, then is culverted from the rear of 1 Herne Road. Its culvert is then visible east of Hook Road at Vale Road North, and after, under Waterside Close and Thornhill Road, to turn east under Cotterill Road. It is the open limit of gardens between Cotterill and Ellerton Roads, until Ditton Road (where culverted). The brook reappears north of pub/restaurant The Oak on Ewell Road. It follows the rear of Beaconsfield Road and then goes under King Charles Road to reappear in Alexandra Recreation Ground, and then flows north-east bisecting Edith Gardens Nature Reserve; east under Raeburn Avenue; north under Meldone Close. It is the central, northward, feature of Berrylands Nature Reserve; under Stirling Walk, it falls east under Elmbridge Avenue to meet the Hogsmill.

== Water quality ==
The Environment Agency measure water quality of the river systems in England. Each is given an overall ecological status, which may be one of five levels: high, good, moderate, poor and bad. There are several components that are used to determine this, including biological status, which looks at the quantity and varieties of invertebrates, angiosperms and fish. Chemical status, which compares the concentrations of various chemicals against known safe concentrations, is rated good or fail.

Water quality of the Hogsmill in 2019:

Section	Ecological Status	Chemical Status	Overall Status	Length	Catchment	Channel
Hogsmill	Moderate	Fail	Moderate	9.908 km (6.157 mi)	72.636 km^{2} (28.045 sq mi)	Heavily modified

== Flooding ==
In January 2014, the Hogsmill burst its banks on the edge of Bourne Hall in Ewell Village, causing several local roads to flood.

== In popular culture ==
=== Literature ===
Richard Jefferies (1848–1887), best known for his nature-writing, wrote about the Hogsmill brook during his years living at Tolworth in two essays, "A Brook" and "A London Trout", that were collected in his book, Nature Near London, published by Chatto and Windus in 1883.

=== Art ===
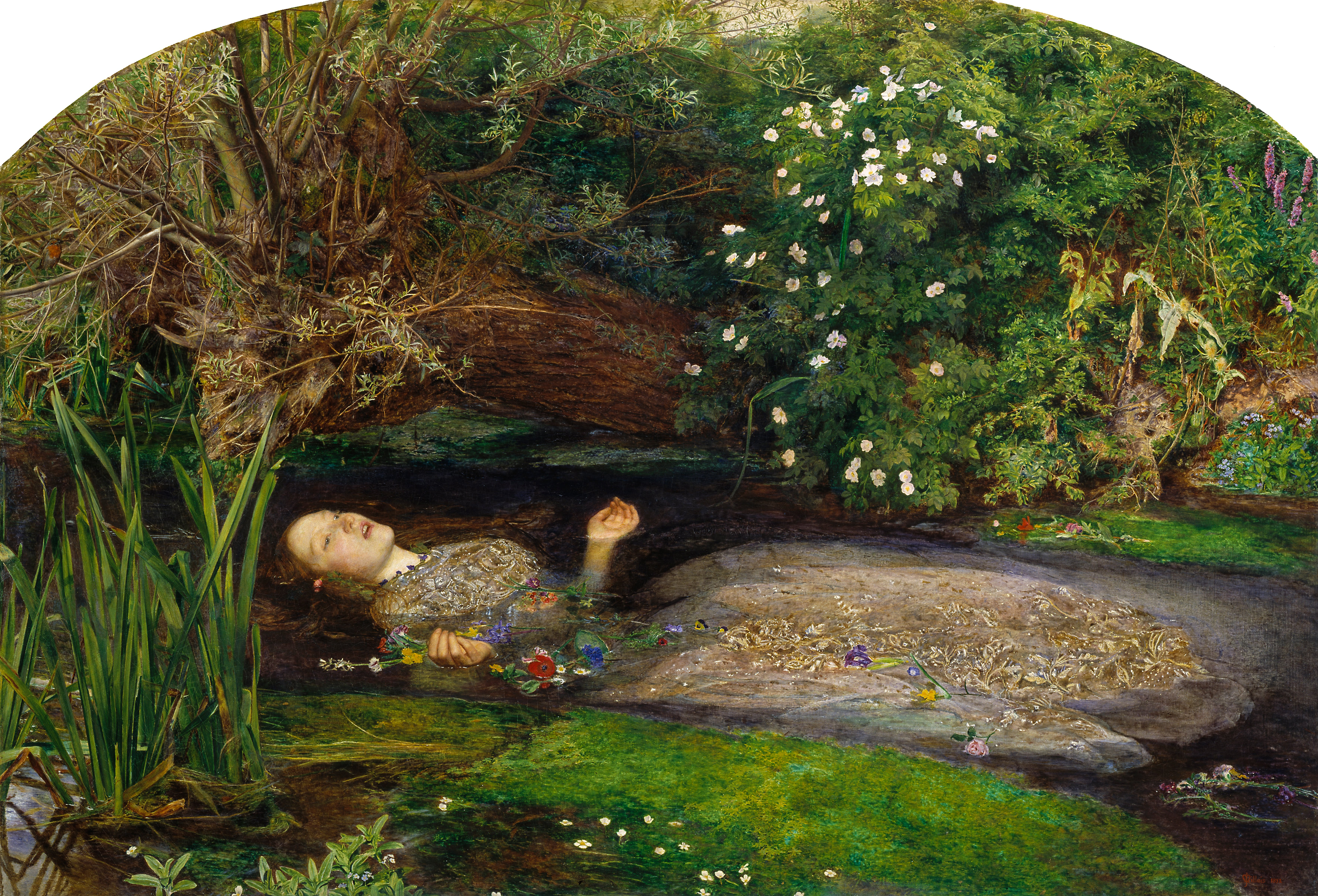
Ophelia – The landscape background was painted by the Hogsmill at Old Malden

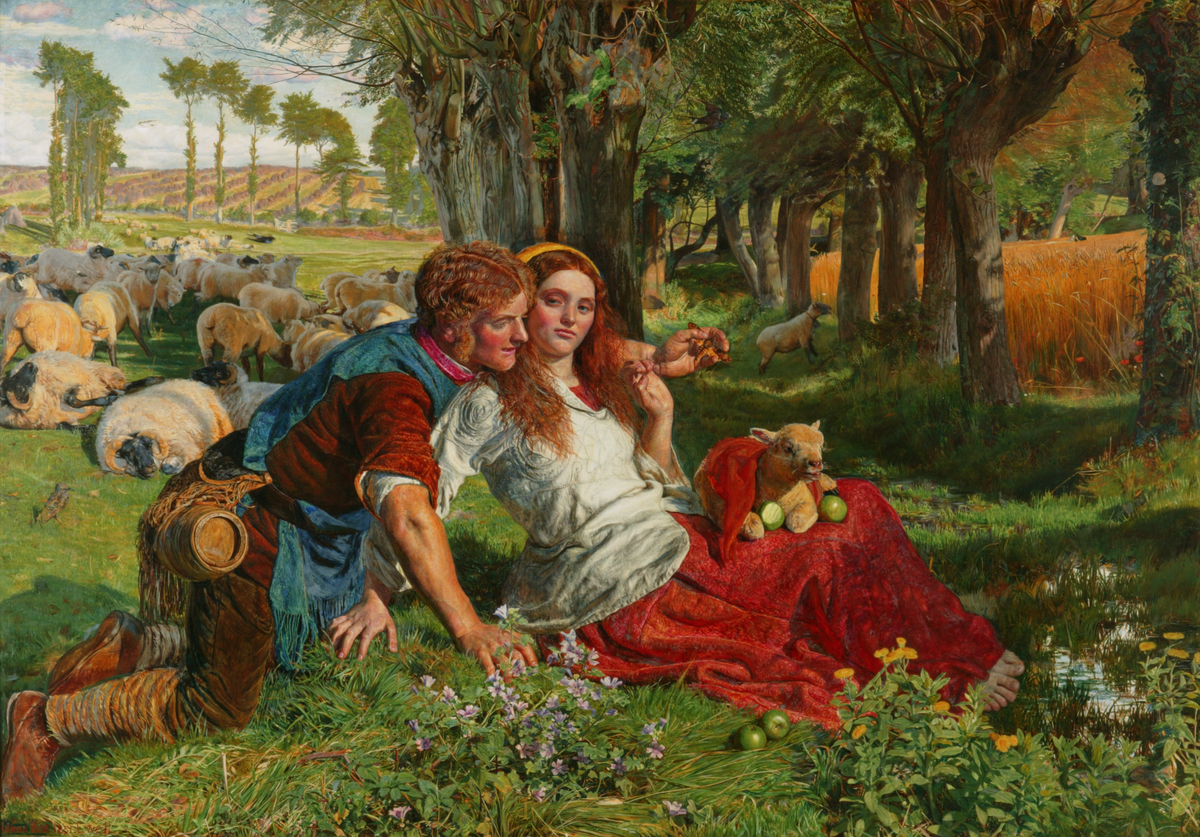
The Hireling Shepherd, dalliance in the Surrey countryside

The Hogsmill has appeared in the art of the Pre-Raphaelite painters, John Millais in his rendition of Ophelia, and William Holman Hunt who painted The Hireling Shepherd on the meadows by the Hogsmill, looking north towards Ewell Court Farm. The doorway (to the soul) in Hunt's The Light of the World is believed to be part of a gunpowder mill on the Hogsmill at Ewell.

=== Local legend ===
William the Conqueror is said to have "watered his horse" in the source waters near today's Spring Hotel. Traditionally, this was at the pool in Bourne Hall Park.

== Industry ==
Part of the course was engineered to be harnessed for watermills near Ewell Court. These joined those of nearby Whitton in the production of gunpowder; which continued for some time after the Napoleonic Wars to help supply the American Civil War. The mills closed in 1875 as they couldn't meet new safety legislation. Dynamos were later installed in one of the old mill buildings to generate electricity for Ewell Court House.

There were also two flour mills in Ewell, the Upper and Lower mills, both also used for paper making at one time. The latter was supposed to have provided the flour for Queen Victoria's bakers. The Upper Mill was the last working corn mill on the river, still working in 1951 when visited by Jack Hillier. It is now the headquarters of the Samaritans.

Another group of gunpowder mills were established at Worcester Park by William Taylor in 1720. They were variously known as the Malden Mills, Long Ditton Mills or Tolworth Mills, being located on the meeting of the three parishes. The works finally closed in the 1860s.

Kingston had three mills; Chapel Mill, or the Old Mill; Middle Mill and the eponymous Hogg's Mill or New Mill. All three were corn mills originally. In later years Middle Mill was used for processing coconut fibres. Chapel Mill was used to crush the coconut kernels to produce oil. Hogg's Mill found further use as a metal polish factory, possibly using crushed coconut shells as the secret ingredient. All have been demolished, although the Old Mill House still exists and is a Grade II listed building. The coconut fibre industry ceased by 1880 and the Middle Mill site was sold to Kelly & Co, Printers (printers of the famous Kelly's Directory,) and became a significant employer in Kingston. Kelly's moved out in 1932 to Andover. The site was redeveloped by Kingston University in the 1990s.

== See also ==
- Tributaries of the River Thames
- List of rivers in England
- Watermills in the United Kingdom

Next confluence upstream	River Thames	Next confluence downstream
Longford River, Raven's Ait (north)	Hogsmill River	Sudbrook (stream) (north)
