= List of local nature reserves in Hertfordshire =

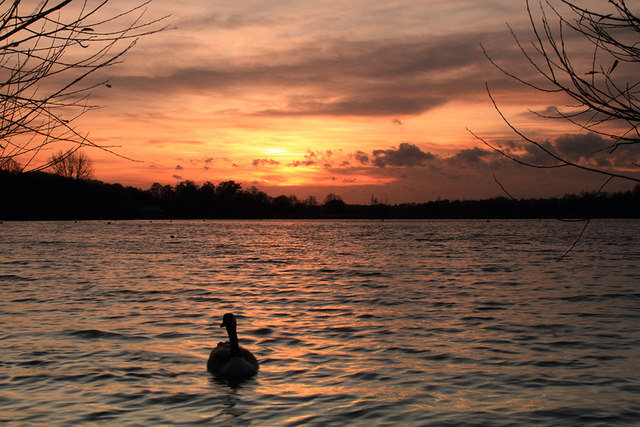
Rickmansworth Aquadrome

Hertfordshire is a county in eastern England. It is bordered by Bedfordshire to the north, Cambridgeshire to the north-east, Essex to the east, Buckinghamshire to the west and Greater London to the south. The county town is Hertford. As of June 2014, the county has a population of 1,154,800 in an area of 634 square miles (1,640 km^{2}).

Local nature reserves (LNRs) are designated by local authorities under the National Parks and Access to the Countryside Act 1949. The local authority must have legal control over the site, by owning or leasing it or having an agreement with the owner. LNRs are sites which have a special local interest either biologically or geologically, and local authorities have a duty to care for them. They can apply local bye-laws to manage and protect LNRs.

As of July 2015, forty-two LNRs in Hertfordshire have been notified to Natural England. The largest site is Therfield Heath with 147.3 hectares (364 acres). It has some of the richest chalk grassland in England, and it is also a Site of Special Scientific Interest (SSSI). The smallest is Oxleys Wood in Hatfield, which has an area of only 1.2 hectares (3.0 acres). This wood often floods, and it provides a habitat for a wide range of insects and birds. Several other sites are also SSSIs, such as Croxley Common Moor and Sherrardspark Wood. The oldest LNR in Hertfordshire listed by Natural England is Hilfield Park Reservoir, declared in 1969, and the newest Weston Hills in 2012.

== Key ==
=== Other classifications ===
- CAONB = Chilterns Area of Outstanding Natural Beauty
- HMWT = Herts and Middlesex Wildlife Trust
- SSSI = Site of Special Scientific Interest

== Sites ==
Site	Photograph	Area (Note: The area is taken from the Natural England map of each site. (Click on the identify icon (i) in the "Feature Tools" and then click on the site.))	Location (Note: The location is taken from the Natural England details page for the site.)	Map (Note: The maps are on the Natural England database of Local Nature Reserves.)	Details (Note: Details are on the pages on each site in the Natural England database of Local Nature Reserves.)	Other classifications	Description
Albans Wood		4.1 hectares (10 acres)	Watford; 51.6941°N 0.3983°W; TL 108 007	Map	Details		The site is ancient semi-natural woodland. It is mainly oak with other trees such as beech, horse chestnut and sweet chestnut. Mammals include muntjac deer and noctule bats.
Batford Springs	River Lea Waterfall at Batford Springs	3.5 hectares (8.6 acres)	St Albans; 51.8228°N 0.3386°W; TL 146 151	Map	Details		The main feature of the reserve is a number of small springs which are the source of chalk streams and ponds. The River Lea runs through the site, and there is grassland and a small wood.
Cassiobury Park	Daffodils in Cassiobury Park	25.1 hectares (62 acres)	Watford; 51.6594°N 0.4256°W; TQ 090 968	Map	Details	HMWT	This large park in Watford has a variety of habitats, including streams, ponds, watercress beds, wet grassland and wet woodland. The Grand Union Canal and River Gade run through the site.
Cheshunt Park (Note: This site is wrongly named Chestnut Park on the details page and correctly Cheshunt Park on the map)		40.0 hectares (99 acres)	Broxbourne; 51.7167°N 0.04575°W; TL 351 038	Map	Details		The history of the park goes back to Roman times. It is grass and woodland which has ancient hedgerows, wildflower meadows, a pond and an orchard which is cropped by traditional cattle breeds.
Chorleywood Common	Chorleywood Common	75.6 hectares (187 acres)	Three Rivers; 51.6542°N 0.5110°W; TQ 031 961	Map	Details	CAONB	Some 300 fungi, 70 plant species and fifty birds have been recorded on the common, which has habitats including acid heathland, neutral grassland, chalk meadows and secondary woodland.
Chorleywood House Estate	Chorleywood House Estate	64.3 hectares (159 acres)	Three Rivers; 51.6631°N 0.5021°W; TQ 037 971	Map	Details		The River Chess runs through the estate, which has formal parkland surrounding a 200-year-old manor house, meadows and mature woodland.
Colney Heath	River Colne in Colney Heath	22.5 hectares (56 acres)	St Albans; 51.7380°N 0.2606°W; TL 202 058	Map	Details		The site is acid grassland, which is unusual in Hertfordshire, and the River Colne runs through it. The heath is managed to maintain the grassland and the diversity of plant species along the river.
The Commons		13.2 hectares (33 acres)	Welwyn Hatfield; 51.7835°N 0.1762°W; TL 259 110	Map	Details		The site has a variety of habitats including oak woodland, flower-rich meadows, wet fens, ditches and ponds. The meadows are grazed by livestock.
Croxley Common Moor	River Gade in Croxley Common Moor	41.2 hectares (102 acres)	Three Rivers; 51.6416°N 0.4363°W; TQ 083 948	Map	Details	SSSI	The site is mainly grass heathland with some ancient woodland and hazel coppice. Over 250 species of plants have been recorded.
Danesbury Park		24.5 hectares (61 acres)	Welwyn Hatfield; 51.8372°N 0.2176°W; TL 229 169	Map	Details		The site was formerly the park of Danesbury House, and it still has some large mature trees which are important to wildlife. Grassland areas, which are grazed by rare-breed cattle, have many varieties of flowering plants.
Fisher's Field		1.8 hectares (4.4 acres)	Hertsmere; 51.6579°N 0.3823°W; TQ 120 967	Map	Details		The area was allotments during the Second World War. There are areas of woodland, with trees including oak, rowan and wild cherry, and a wildflower meadow and scrub with bramble, raspberry and willow herb. Animals include green woodpeckers, shrews and bees.
Furzefield Wood and Lower Halfpenny	Pigeon in Furzefield Wood	7.4 hectares (18 acres)	Hertsmere; 51.7057°N 0.2040°W; TL 242 023	Map	Details		The wood has been managed for coppicing for over 300 years. It now provides a habitat for birds, and fallen branches are important for invertebrates. Lower Halfpenny is a meadow which was once the route of an old drovers' track.
Garston Park		6.4 hectares (16 acres)	Watford; 51.6912°N 0.3796°W; TL 121 004	Map	Details		The nature reserve has woodland which is mainly oak, ash and sycamore, and there are also areas of grassland and wetland. Mammals include muntjac deer and pipistrelle bats.
Harebreaks Wood		5.1 hectares (13 acres)	Watford; 51.6808°N 0.4089°W; TQ 101 992	Map	Details		The site is semi-natural woodland of oak, ash and cherry, which goes back to at least 1600. Birds include treecreeper and nuthatch, and there mammals such as muntjac deer and pipistrelle bats.
Hilfield Park Reservoir (Note: Access to Hilfield Park Reservoir is restricted to members of the Herts and Middlesex Wildlife Trust. It is the only LNR in Hertfordshire which is not open to the public.)		74.7 hectares (185 acres)	Hertsmere; 51.6491°N 0.3276°W; TQ 158 958	Map	Details	HMWT	This large reservoir is of national importance for pochards, tufted ducks and common tern. The margins have marshy areas with many breeding birds and marsh plants, such as reedmace and reed canarygrass.
Howe Dell		4.0 hectares (9.9 acres)	Welwyn Hatfield; 51.7572°N 0.2222°W; TL 228 080	Map	Details		The site is woodland which runs along both sides of a stream with steep sides. The main trees are hornbeam, oak and beech.
Howe Grove Wood		8.5 hectares (21 acres)	Dacorum; 51.7661°N 0.4668°W; TL 059 086	Map	Details		This site is dense woodland next to the A4147 road in Hemel Hempstead.
Ivel Springs	Spring at Radwell feeding the Ivel	15.4 hectares (38 acres)	North Hertfordshire; 51.9942°N 0.1939°W; TL 241 344	Map	Details		The site, which was a rubbish dump until the 1950s, has habitats including woodland, wetland and pasture. Its springs are the source of the River Ivel, and they have a wide variety of wildlife.
The Lairage Land		4.4 hectares (11 acres)	Watford; 51.6448°N 0.4059°W; TQ 104 952	Map	Details		The site is mainly rough grassland, with some woodland and scrub. The River Colne runs along its southern boundary, with stream water crowfoot and yellow water lily growing in the water. A notable insect is Roesel's bush-crickets.
Mardley Heath	Mardley Heath	41.1 hectares (102 acres)	Welwyn Hatfield; 51.8494°N 0.1925°W; TL 246 183	Map	Details		In the middle of the twentieth century the heath was used for gravel extraction, and it is now regenerating naturally. Oak and hornbeam woodland around the perimeter remains, and it is managed to enhance biodiversity.
Marshalls Heath		4.0 hectares (9.9 acres)	St Albans; 51.8207°N 0.3169°W; TL 161 149	Map	Details		The site is secondary woodland and scrub on acid heathland, but the many species recorded include forty on national lists of threatened species. It is one of the key Hertfordshire sites for butterflies and moths.
Northaw Great Wood Country Park		120.7 hectares (298 acres)	Welwyn Hatfield; 51.7227°N 0.14105304°W; TL 285 043	Map	Details	SSSI	The park has one of the county's most extensive areas of ancient hornbeam woodland, with other trees including oak and silver birch. Glades, streams and springs add to the biodiversity.
Norton Common	Trees on a snowy Norton Common	25.7 hectares (64 acres)	North Hertfordshire; 51.9848°N 0.2278°W; TL 218 333	Map	Details		Woodland on this site has diverse wildlife including black squirrels, muntjac deer, and birds such as chiff chaffs and blackcaps. There are also meadows with wild flowers, and the Pix Brook, which is fed by mineral-rich springs.
Oughtonhead Common	River Oughton at Oughtonhead Common	17.4 hectares (43 acres)	North Hertfordshire; 51.9607°N 0.3015°W; TL 168 305	Map	Details		The common is part of the Chilterns Area of Outstanding Natural Beauty. It has a wide variety of habitats, and the River Oughton flows along the edge. English Longhorn cattle graze pasture areas.
Oxhey Woods	Oxhey Woods	100.2 hectares (248 acres)	Three Rivers; 51.6241°N 0.4080°W; TQ 103 929	Map	Details		The site is mainly semi-natural woodland, and some areas date back to the end of the last Ice Age, the Younger Dryas, 11,500 years ago. Plants include bluebells, anemones and violets and the rare wild service tree.
Oxleys Wood		1.2 hectares (3.0 acres)	Welwyn Hatfield; 51.7509°N 0.2232°W; TL 227 073	Map	Details		The wood floods in wet weather, particularly the northern part, which has a pond. Tree species include oak, ash, elm and willow, and they provide a habitat for insects which provide food for birds.
Prestwick Road Meadows		2.8 hectares (6.9 acres)	Three Rivers; 51.6176°N 0.3880°W; TQ 117 922	Map	Details		This site was formerly farm meadows. It has many insects and flowers include purple knapweed, yellow birdsfoot-trefoil and red clover. Old hedgerows still survive, and there is also a seasonal pond where frogs breed in the spring.
Purwell Meadows		8.6 hectares (21 acres)	North Hertfordshire; 51.9538°N 0.2552°W; TL 200 298	Map	Details		The River Purwell runs through the meadows. Wildlife includes kingfishers, which are native to the area, and water voles.
Rickmansworth Aquadrome	Rickmansworth Aquadrome	41.0 hectares (101 acres)	Three Rivers; 51.6331°N 0.4785°W; TQ 054 938	Map	Details		There are two lakes and a diverse range of wildlife habitats. The site has trees such as oaks and willows, birds including herons and moorhens, and small copper and gatekeeper butterflies.
Sherrardspark Wood	Sherrardspark Wood	73.2 hectares (181 acres)	Welwyn Hatfield; 51.8102°N 0.2172°W; TL 230 139	Map	Details	SSSI	Much of this site is sessile oak woodland. Some trees are 250 years old, and diverse flora includes violet and broad-leaved helleborine, both of which are rare.
Shrubhill Common		9.8 hectares (24 acres)	Dacorum; 51.7539°N 0.5020°W; TL 035 072	Map	Details	CAONB	The common is woodland and scrub, together with two fields which are chalk grassland. There are over 100 species of wild flowers, and herbs such as marjoram and basil.
Singlers Marsh		6.3 hectares (16 acres)	Welwyn Hatfield; 51.8354°N 0.2206°W; TL 227 167	Map	Details		The River Mimram runs along the edge of this site. It has grassland, which is managed by cattle grazing and cutting, and areas of willow scrub with some more mature trees.
Stanborough Reedmarsh		3.3 hectares (8.2 acres)	Welwyn Hatfield; 51.8102°N 0.2172°W; TL 230 139	Map	Details	HMWT	The site is wet willow woodland on the bank of the River Lea. It is important for water voles and birds such as reed and sedge warblers. Water figwort, common meadow rue and water chickweed grow along the river bank.
Stocker's Lake	Stockers Lake	37.9 hectares (94 acres)	Three Rivers; 51.6297°N 0.4887°W; TQ 047 934	Map	Details	HMWT	This is an old flooded gravel pit which has over sixty species of breeding birds, including shoveler and goldeneye ducks in nationally important numbers.
Therfield Heath	Pulsatilla Vulgaris On Therfield Heath	147.3 hectares (364 acres)	North Hertfordshire; 52.0423°N 0.05491°W; TL 335 400	Map	Details	SSSI	This is unimproved pasture and has some of the richest chalk grassland in England. Plants include the rare pasque flower, and there are insects such as the chalkhill blue butterfly.
Top Field and Cozens Grove		6.1 hectares (15 acres)	Broxbourne; 51.7416°N 0.03164°W; TL 360 066	Map	Details		Top Field is a wildflower meadow which is mown to provide a habitat for small mammals, birds and insects. Cozens Grove is an ancient wood which has coppiced hornbeam and a medieval sunken ditch.
Watercress Wildlife Site		1.2 hectares (3.0 acres)	St Albans; 51.7436°N 0.3328°W; TL 152 063	Map	Details		The site was formerly one of the many commercial watercress beds in the area. It has a wide variety of wildlife, including water rails, kingfishers, little grebes and muntjac deer.
Waterford Heath	Waterford Heath	35.2 hectares (87 acres)	East Hertfordshire; 51.8181°N 0.09215°W; TL 316 150	Map	Details	HMWT	The site is mainly grassland, with areas of scrub, wood plantation and semi-natural woodland. Breeding birds include skylarks and willow warblers, and there are reptiles such as slow worms and grass snakes.
Weston Hills		17.0 hectares (42 acres)	North Hertfordshire; 51.8042°N 0.18189°W; TL 250 326	Map	Details		Chalk grassland is its most important ecological feature and one of the best examples in Hertfordshire; plants are very diverse because the harsh conditions do not allow vigorous species to become dominant.
Wheathampstead		5.9 hectares (15 acres)	St Albans; 51.8042°N 0.18188°W; TL 177 131	Map	Details		This L-shaped site has ash woodland, thorn scrub, mature hedgerows, and rough grassland. There are plants such as grass vetchling and bee orchid, birds including yellowhammer and whitethroat, and many butterflies.
The Wick		3.4 hectares (8.4 acres)	St Albans; 51.7619°N 0.3108°W; TL 166 083	Map	Details		This is ancient woodland which is semi-natural, and the main trees are oak and hornbeam. Other features are a seasonal pond and historic field boundaries of bank and ditch.
The Withey Beds		7.5 hectares (19 acres)	Three Rivers; 51.6345°N 0.4438°W; TQ 078 940	Map	Details		The site borders the River Colne, and it has a variety of habitats including dry grassland, wet woodland, marsh and ditches. A World War II pillbox has been turned into a bat roost.

== See also ==
- List of Sites of Special Scientific Interest in Hertfordshire
- Herts and Middlesex Wildlife Trust
- List of local nature reserves in England
