= Belsize =

Belsize could refer to:

- Belsize Park – also known as 'Belsize' – a neighbourhood in London, the United Kingdom
- Belsize (ward), a ward named after Belsize Park, London
- Belsize Lane, a street in Belsize Park
- Belsize Park Gardens, a street in Belsize Park
- Belsize House, historic house
- Belsize Road, a street in South Hampstead, London
- Belsize, Hertfordshire, a hamlet in Hertfordshire
- Belsize architects, a firm of architects based in Belsize Park, London
- Belsize Motors, a former automobile-manufacturing firm based in Manchester
