= Osmond Barnes =

Officer of the British Indian Army (1834–1930)

Osmond Barnes CB
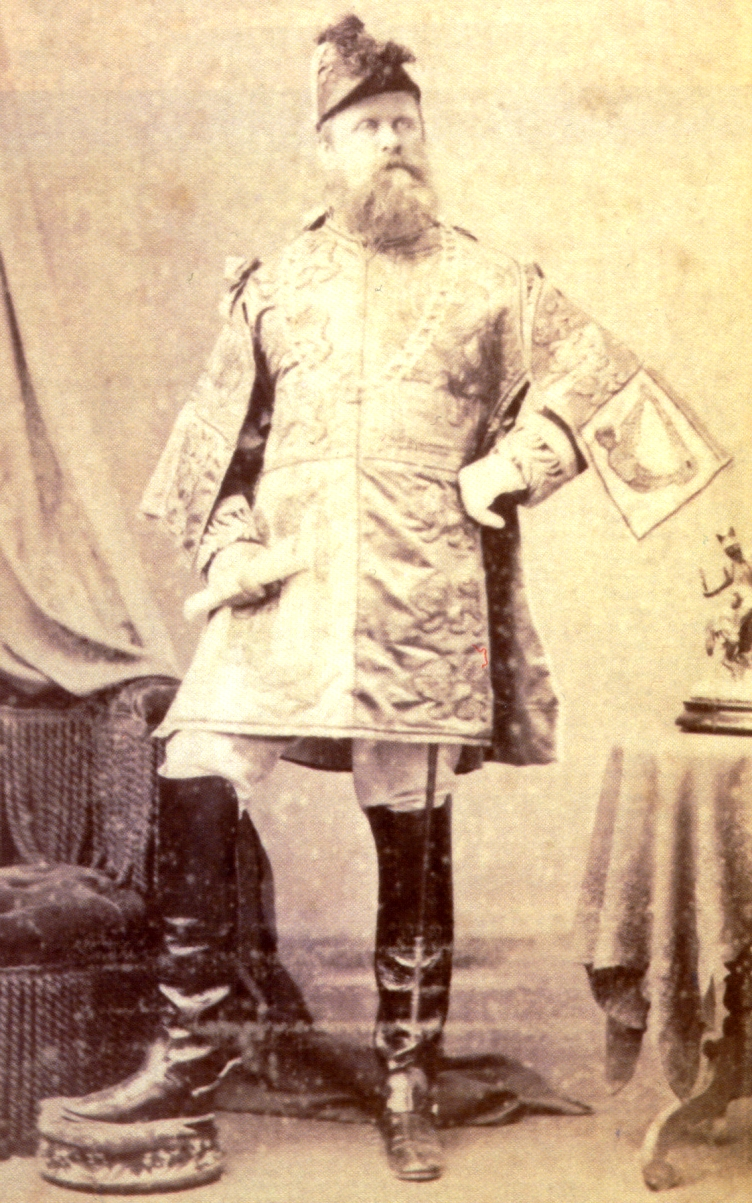
- Barnes in tabard as Chief Herald of India at the Delhi Durbar of 1877
- Born: 23 December 1834; Bryanston Square, London
- Died: 20 May 1930 (aged 95)
- Education: Rugby School
- Spouse: Emily Mainwaring (m. 1862)
- Military career
- Branch: British Indian Army
- Service years: 1855–1893
- Rank: Colonel
- Units: Bombay Staff Corps; Bengal Staff Corps; Indian Staff Corps; 10th Bengal Lancers
- Known for: Proclaiming Queen Victoria Empress of India at the Delhi Durbar of 1877
- Conflicts: Indian Rebellion of 1857; Abyssinian Expedition; Second Anglo-Afghan War; Zhob Valley campaign (1884)
- Awards: Companion of the Order of the Bath (1893); Mentioned in despatches
- Other work: Chief Herald of India

Colonel Osmond Barnes CB (23 December 1834 – 20 May 1930) was a British officer of the Indian Army and Chief Herald of India.

== Early life ==
The son of John Barnes, of Portland Place, London, and Chorleywood House, Hertfordshire, Barnes was born in Bryanston Square, London, on 23 December 1834, and educated at Rugby School.

His parents, John Barnes and Sarah Medley, were married on 21 July 1824, and had eleven children, Edmund John, Augusta, Sarah, Lucy Antoinette, Charles Augustus, Edward Medley, John Henry, Osmond, Harold, Ada Mary, and Jocelyn.

In 1831, in reporting the early death of Barnes's sister Augusta at the age of five, The Gentleman's Magazine described their father as "John Barnes, esq., banker, Faringdon, and of Chorley Wood House".

An obituary of Osmond Barnes states that at the time of his birth, his father, John Barnes, was a High Sheriff. However, according to The Gentleman's Magazine and the Annual Register, John Barnes of Chorley Wood House was appointed High Sheriff of Buckinghamshire in the year 1844. Chorleywood, although in Hertfordshire, is close to its boundary with Buckinghamshire.

== Career ==
=== Military service ===
Barnes joined the Indian Army in 1855 and served through the Indian Mutiny of 1857 to 1859.

At the time of his marriage in August 1862, he was described as "Lieut. Bombay Staff Corps and Commandant of the Lahore Light Horse"

Barnes was gazetted a Lieutenant of the 13th Native Infantry in 1863 and saw active service in Abyssinia in 1868 and in the Afghan War of 1878–1879, where he was mentioned in despatches. He was promoted Captain on 5 March 1867, gazetted a Captain of the Bengal Staff Corps on 14 November 1871, promoted Major on 5 March 1875 and ranked as Major from 4 March 1875. He was promoted Lieutenant-Colonel in the Bengal Staff Corps on 4 March 1881. He served in the Zhob Valley Campaign of 1884, being again mentioned in despatches. He was promoted Colonel in the Bengal Staff Corps on 4 March 1885.

He commanded the 10th Bengal Lancers.

Barnes retired the service on 4 March 1893, announced in the Gazette as "INDIAN STAFF CORPS Colonel Osmond Barnes is transferred to the Unemployed Supernumerary List. Dated 4 March 1893". When appointed a Companion of the Order of the Bath in June 1893, he was described as "Lieutenant-Colonel and Colonel Osmond Barnes, Indian Staff Corps".

=== Herald ===
Barnes became Chief Herald of India. In this role, in 1877, he had the task of proclaiming Queen Victoria as Empress of India at Delhi.

A wood-engraving of Barnes appeared in The Graphic newspaper for 10 March 1877, showing him in a tabard as Chief Herald of India. He was described as 'Major Osmond Barnes (Tenth Bengal Cavalry)".

== Private life ==
Osmond Barnes married Emily Mainwaring, they had six children - Harold, Percy, Osmond Mainwaring, Charles, Mabel, and Irene.

The marriage was announced in The Gentleman's Magazine for November 1862 -

MARRIAGES Aug. 5, at Barrackpore, Bengal, Osmond Barnes, esq., Lieut. Bombay Staff Corps and Commandant of the Lahore Light Horse, son of J. Barnes, esq., of Chorleywood-house, Herts., to Emily Sophia Isabella, only dau. of Col. E. R. Mainwaring, H.M.'s Bengal Army.

Barnes retired to England and lived to be ninety-five, although his wife had died in 1912.

== Honours ==
- Abyssinia campaign medal, 1868
- Mentioned in despatches, 1868 and 1884
- Companion of the Order of the Bath, 1893 Queen's Birthday Honours
