= Loudwater =

Loudwater may refer to:

- Loudwater, Buckinghamshire, a village near High Wycombe, Buckinghamshire, United Kingdom
- Loudwater, Hertfordshire, a village in Hertfordshire, United Kingdom
- An alternative name for the river Bruinen, part of J. R. R. Tolkien's Middle-earth legendarium
