= Chorleywood =

Village in Hertfordshire, England

Coordinates: 51.65°N 0.51°W

- Location within Hertfordshire
- Population: 11,286 (2011 Census, Parish)
- OS grid reference: TQ025965
- District: Three Rivers
- Shire county: Hertfordshire
- Region: East
- Country: England
- Sovereign state: United Kingdom
- Post town: Rickmansworth
- Postcode district: WD3
- Dialling code: 01923
- Police: Hertfordshire
- Fire: Hertfordshire
- Ambulance: East of England
- UK Parliament: South West Hertfordshire

Chorleywood is a village and civil parish in the Three Rivers District, Hertfordshire, on the border with Buckinghamshire, approximately 20 miles (32 km) northwest of Charing Cross. The village is adjacent to the Chiltern Hills Area of Outstanding Natural Beauty and is part of the London commuter belt included in the government-defined Greater London Urban Area. Chorleywood was historically part of the parish of Rickmansworth, becoming a separate ecclesiastical parish in 1845 and a separate civil parish in 1898. The population of the parish was 11,286 at the 2011 census.

In 2004, a study by The Social Disadvantage Research Centre at the University of Oxford named Chorleywood as the "happiest place" to live in the UK. Of the 32,482 communities surveyed, Chorleywood came out top. More recently, Chorleywood has been ranked as the "least deprived" area in the country by the Department of Communities and Local Government.

== History ==
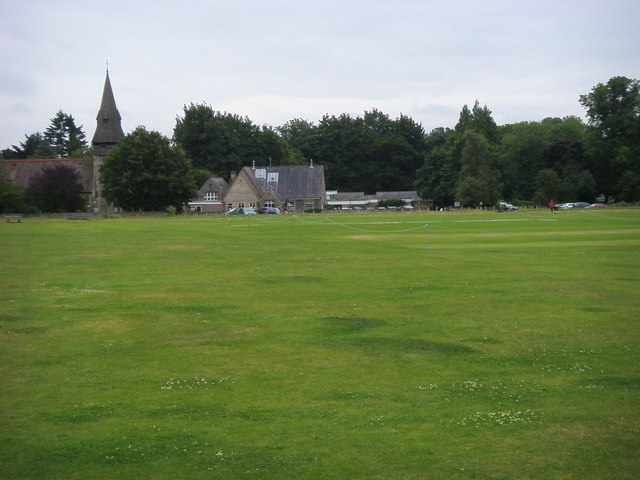
Cricket Ground Chorleywood Common

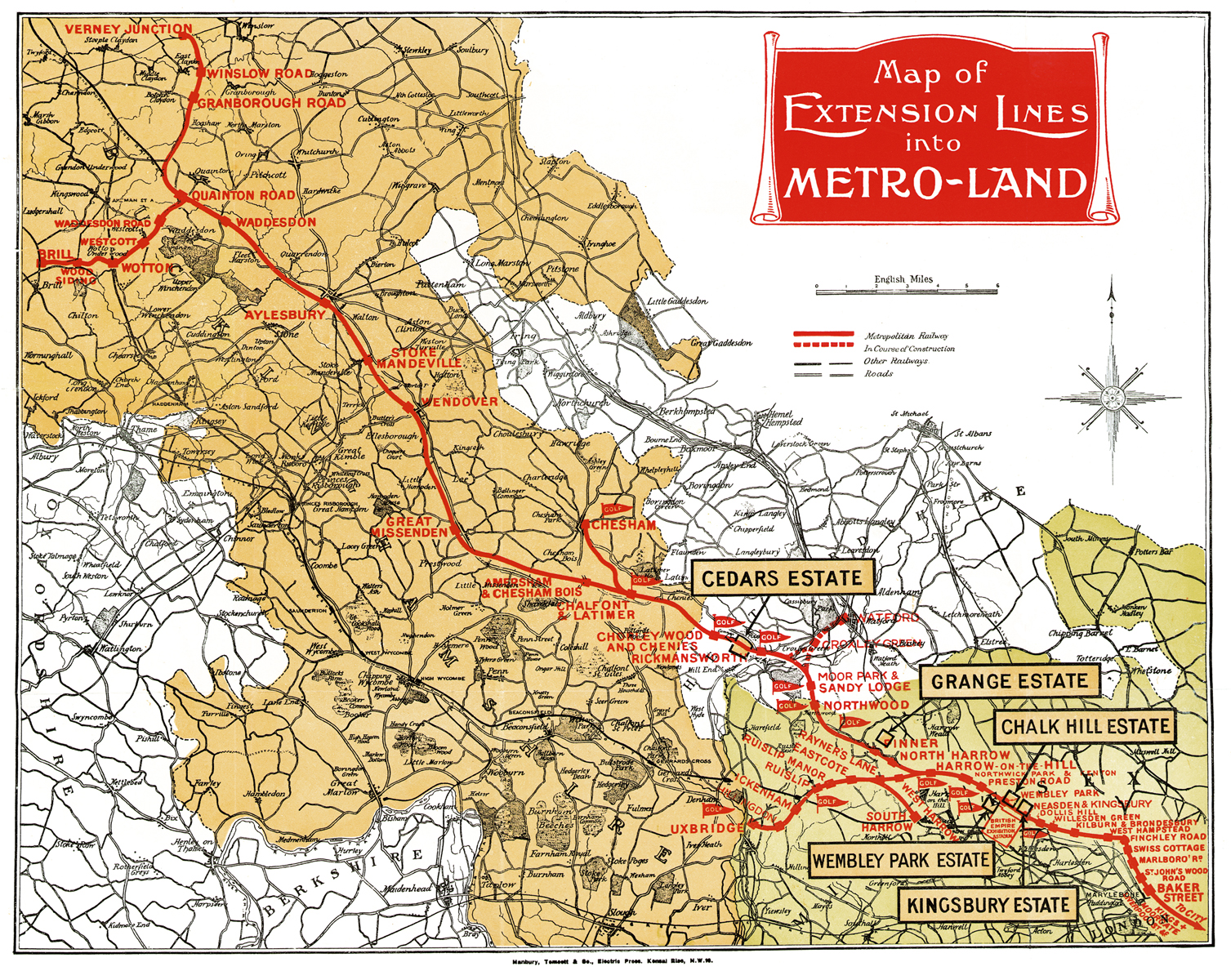
Map of "Metro-land", from the 1924 Metro-land booklet published by the Metropolitan Railway

Settlement at Chorleywood dates to the Paleolithic era when the plentiful flint supply led to swift development of tools by man. The Romans built a village on the ancient site complete with a mill and brewery.

Though variants have been proposed, the name has been derived from the Anglo-Saxon leah, meaning a clearing or a wood, of the ceorla or peasants. A line runs through Chorleywood that once divided the Kingdoms of Mercia and Wessex and now divides the counties of Hertfordshire and Buckinghamshire. Edward the Confessor gave Chorleywood to the Monastery of St Albans.

By 1278, it was known, perhaps duplicating the "woodland" element, as 'Bosco de Cherle' or 'Churl's Wood', Norman for 'Peasant's Wood'. Upon the Dissolution of the Monasteries, it passed to the Bishopric of London, being renamed 'Charleywoode'. It became Crown property during the reign of Elizabeth I. The Turnpike Act (1663) gave Chorleywood a chance to exploit its strategic position, allowing locals the opportunity to charge civilians to use the road from Hatfield to Reading.

Chorleywood is most famous for its Quakers. Non-conformists flocked to Chorleywood, promised sanctuary by the locals. William Penn founded the Pennsylvania Colony with settlers from Chorleywood, Rickmansworth and nearby towns in southern Buckinghamshire, having lived and married in Chorleywood.

Chorleywood House, a Regency mansion, was built in 1822 by John Barnes, replacing an earlier house. John Saunders Gilliat, the Governor of the Bank of England in 1883–1885, lived in it. In 1892, the house was bought by Lady Ela Sackville Russell, eldest daughter of the 9th Duke of Bedford. She modified and enlarged the house turning the grounds into a model estate with market gardens.

The Metropolitan Railway opened Chorleywood station on 8 July 1889.

In the early 1960s, researchers at the British Baking Industries Research Association in Chorleywood improved upon an earlier American bread-making process. This resulted in the Chorleywood bread process which is now used in over 80% of commercial bread production throughout the UK.

In the 1973 BBC Television documentary, Metro-land, Sir John Betjeman described Chorleywood as "essential Metro-land".

Chorleywood has frequently been used as a filming location. The Royal Masonic School is featured in Indiana Jones and the Last Crusade, while the Black Horse pub is featured in Peep Show. Midsomer Murders, Lewis and Jonathan Creek have also been filmed in Chorleywood.

== Chorleywood Common ==
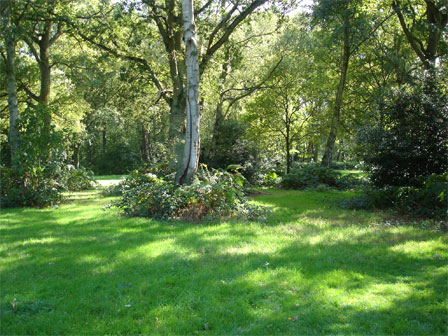
Chorleywood Common

Chorleywood Common is 0.8 square kilometres (200 acres) of wooded common land. The Common is a County Heritage Site, a Conservation Area and a Local Nature Reserve with significant biodiversity and rich in fauna and flora, fungi, birds and wildlife. Since cattle grazing ended soon after the First World War, the land has been used for recreational purposes. Chorleywood Golf Club maintains a nine-hole golf course on the Common; the golf club was founded in 1890 and is the oldest in Hertfordshire.

In the 19th century, the MCC established a cricket pitch on the Common, which is used by Chorleywood Cricket Club's senior and junior teams to this day.

== Governance ==
Chorleywood has three tiers of local government at parish, district, and county level: Chorleywood Parish Council, Three Rivers District Council, and Hertfordshire County Council.

Chorleywood
- Urban District
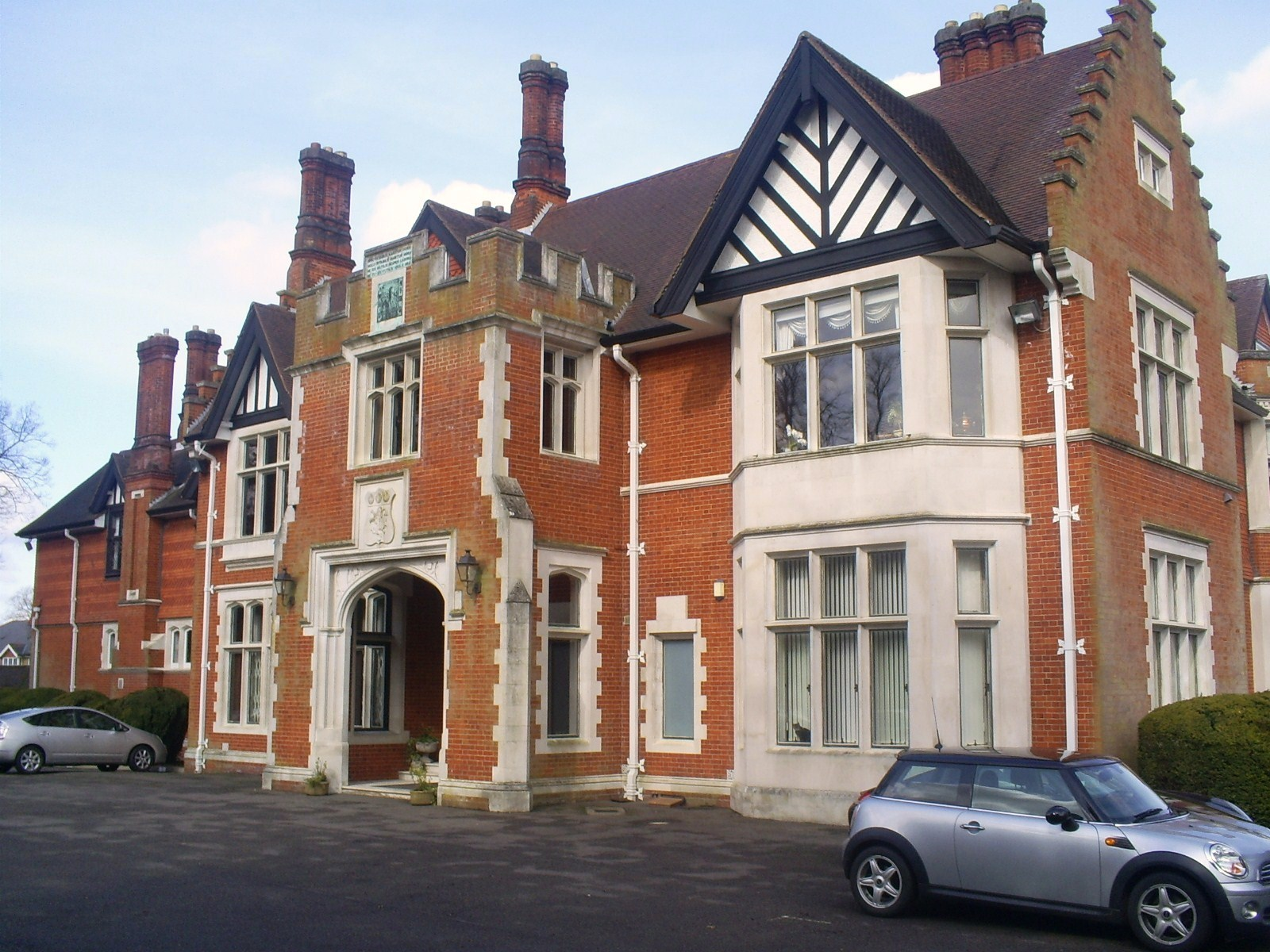
- Council Offices: Chorleywood House, Rickmansworth Road, Chorleywood
- Population
  - 1911: 1,947
  - 1971: 8,270
- History
  - Created: 1 April 1913
  - Abolished: 31 March 1974
  - Succeeded by: Three Rivers
  - HQ: Chorleywood
- Contained within
  - County Council: Hertfordshire

Chorleywood was historically part of the parish of Rickmansworth. A separate ecclesiastical parish of Chorleywood was created in 1845, following the construction of Christ Church, but Chorleywood remained part of the civil parish of Rickmansworth until 1898. When the Local Government Act 1894 created parish and district councils in December 1894, a parish council was established for Rickmansworth, which was in turn part of the Watford Rural District. Shortly afterwards inquiries were held into creating an urban district of Rickmansworth. It was eventually decided that it would not be appropriate to apply urban powers to the whole civil parish of Rickmansworth, and therefore that it would be split into three new parishes: Rickmansworth Urban, Rickmansworth Rural, and Chorleywood. These changes took effect on 15 April 1898, with the Chorleywood and Rickmansworth Rural parishes remaining in the Watford Rural District. The first meeting of Chorleywood Parish Council was held on 16 April 1898 at the village school, with Charles Barnes being appointed the first chairman.

Chorleywood became an urban district itself on 1 April 1913, making it independent of Watford Rural District. The first meeting of Chorleywood Urban District Council was held on 15 April 1913 at the clubhouse of Chorleywood Golf Club on Common Road. Arthur Capell was elected as first chairman of the council. The council generally met at the Golf Club until the Second World War. A council chamber and surveyor's office was incorporated into the Chorleywood Memorial Hall on Common Road, built in 1922, and the council did meet there during 1923 and 1924, but then decided that the meeting room at the Golf Club was preferable and reverted to holding meetings there in 1925.

In 1939 Chorleywood Urban District Council bought Chorleywood House for £5,000. The house became the council's offices and meeting place until the council's abolition in 1974.

Chorleywood Urban District was abolished under the Local Government Act 1972, merging with Rickmansworth Urban District and most of Watford Rural District to form the Three Rivers non-metropolitan district with effect from 1 April 1974. A new Chorleywood Parish Council was created as a successor parish to the former urban district.

== Transport ==
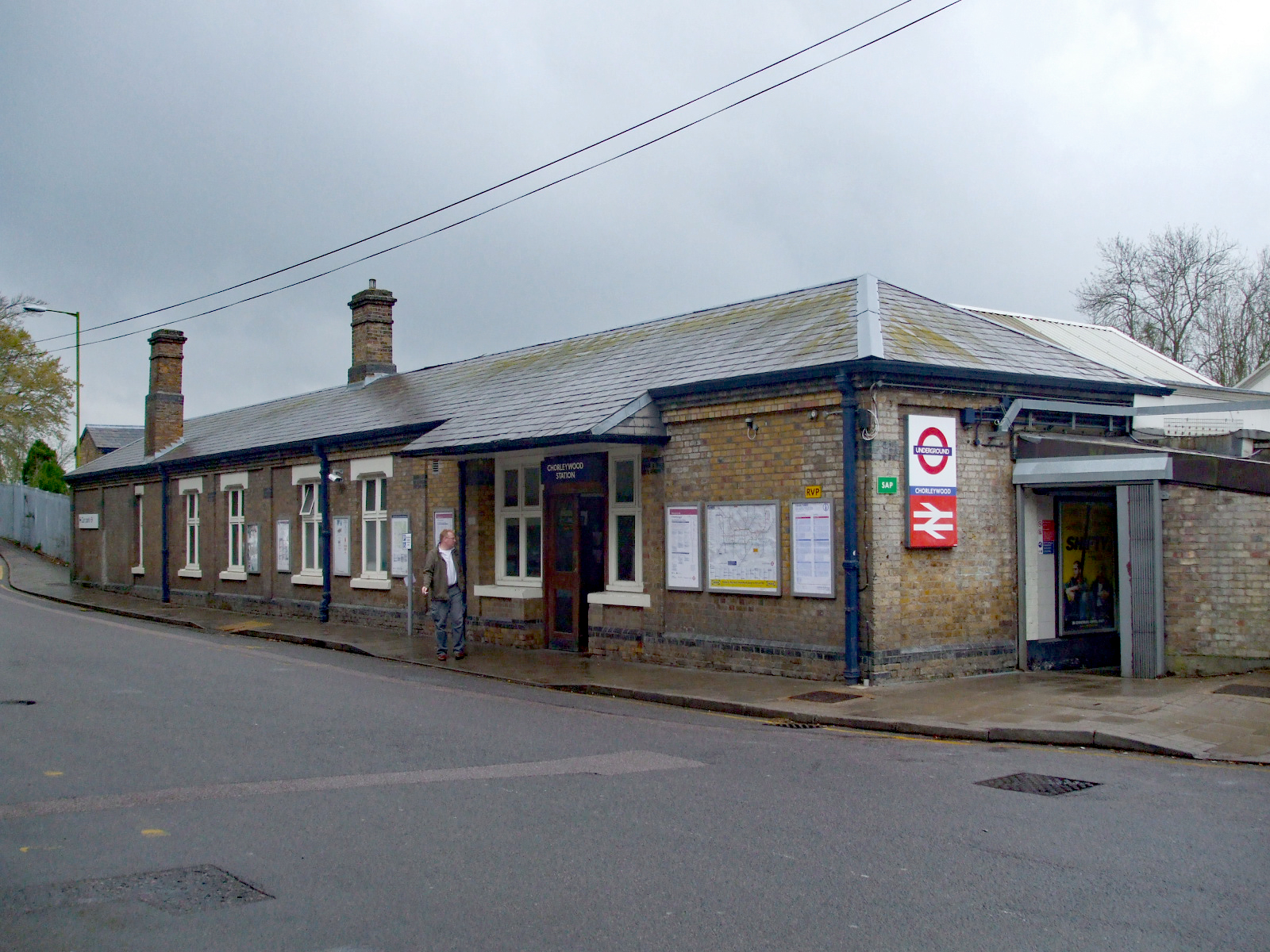
Chorleywood Station

Chorleywood has grown in the past century following the extension of the Metropolitan Railway (also known as the Met). Chorleywood station is in Zone 7 of the London Underground Metropolitan line, and is situated between Rickmansworth and Chalfont and Latimer. The majority of trains stopping at Chorleywood are operated by London Underground. The station is also on the Chiltern Railways line running between Marylebone and Aylesbury.

Junctions 17 and 18 of the M25 are at Chorleywood, as well as the A404.

The 336 bus route runs from Chorleywood to Watford and North Bushey.

== Politics ==
Rickmansworth is a part of the UK Parliament constituency of South West Hertfordshire. Gagan Mohindra of the Conservative Party has been the Member of Parliament since the December 2019 general election.

The Three Rivers Chorleywood district constituency includes Chorleywood, Sarratt and part of Abbots Langley. Liberal Democrat Phil Williams is the councillor at Hertfordshire County Council.

The two wards, Chorleywood North & Sarratt and Chorleywood South & Maple Cross, are divided by the railway line. Chorleywood South & Maple Cross includes most of Chorleywood village and Maple Cross. Chorleywood North & Sarratt includes the north area of Chorleywood, Loudwater, Sarratt and Belsize.

Chorleywood parish covers all of Chorleywood, Loudwater, and the north-western parts of Rickmansworth.

== Schools ==
St Clement Danes School is a mixed-academy school.

Christ Church School, Chorleywood Primary and Russell School are mixed-primary schools.

== Demography ==
At the 2011 census, the parish of Chorleywood had a resident population of 11,286, of whom:

	Chorleywood (parish)	Three Rivers	England & Wales
Age
Median age	44	41	39
Under 18	23.8%	22.7%	21.3%
Over 65	20.5%	16.8%	16.4%
Ethnic group
White British	79.6%	79.7%	80.5%
White Other	6.0%	6.6%	5.5%
Indian or British Indian	7.9%	6.0%	2.5%
Other Asian or British Asian	3.1%	3.2%	5.0%
Black or Black British	0.7%	1.8%	3.3%
Other ethnic group	0.4%	0.5%	1.0%
Religion
Christian	59.3%	59.9%	59.3%
Hindu	5.8%	4.5%	1.5%
Jewish	2.8%	1.8%	0.5%
Muslim	2.1%	2.2%	4.8%
Another religion	1.7%	1.6%	1.6%
No religion	20.9%	22.8%	25.1%
Did not answer	7.5%	7.0%	7.2%

== Twinning ==
Chorleywood is twinned with Dardilly, France.

== Notable residents ==
- Scott Baker, English Court of Appeal judge
- Josephine Bradley, ballroom dance teacher
- Emily Corrie, sailor and actress
- Harley Dalrymple-Hay, civil engineer
- Berthe des Clayes, Scottish artist
- Julie Felix, American folk singer
- David Gauke, Conservative MP for South West Hertfordshire
- John Saunders Gilliat, banker and Conservative politician
- Martin Gilliat, private secretary to Queen Elizabeth the Queen Mother
- Madge Kendal, actress
- Gustav Lachmann, German aeronautical engineer
- Barbara Mills, barrister
- Feargus O'Connor, Irish Chartist leader
- David Pytches, bishop
- William Prowting Roberts, noted Chartist
- Johnny Speight, television comedy writer
- C. F. A. Voysey, architect and designer
- Roger Walters, architect

== Freedom of the Parish ==
The following people and military units have received the Freedom of the Parish of Chorleywood.

=== Individuals ===
- Robert "Bob" Arthy: 25 April 2023.
