= The Wick Local Nature Reserve =

Nature reserve in Hertfordshire, England

Coordinates: 51.7619°N 0.3108°W

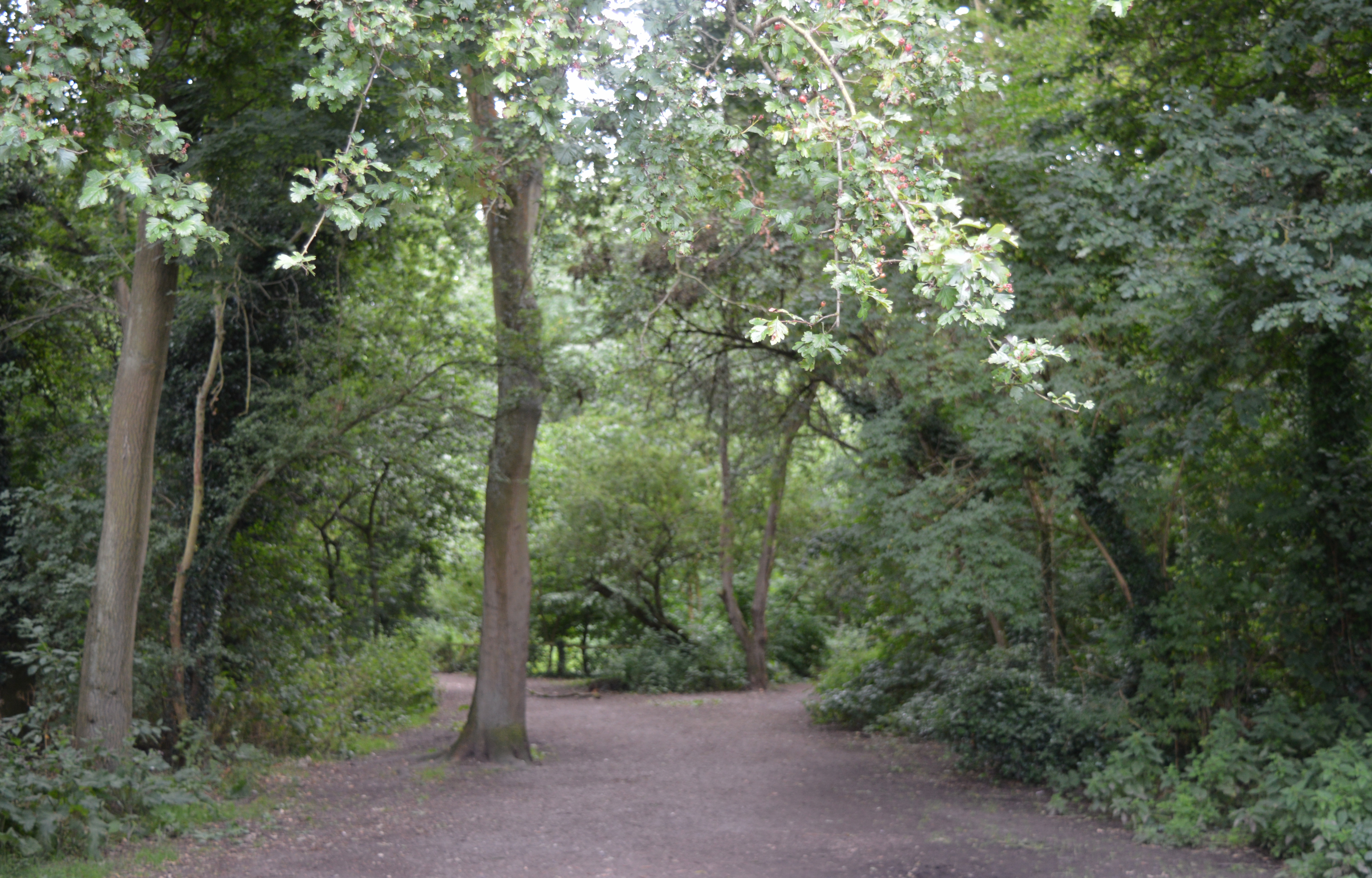

The Wick is a 3.4 hectare Local Nature Reserve in St Albans in Hertfordshire. It is owned and managed by St Albans City Council. It is also designated a County Wildlife Site.

The land was transferred to the council by Sir Arthur Copson Peake in 1929 “to keep the land in its wild state, as nature made it”. It is ancient woodland which is semi-natural, and the main trees are oak and hornbeam. Other features are a seasonal pond and historic field boundaries of bank and ditch. The Friends of the Wick assists with maintenance.

There is access from Sandpit Lane and Marshal's Drive.
