= Wheathampstead Local Nature Reserve =

Nature reserve in Hertfordshire, England

Coordinates: 51.8042°N 0.18188°W

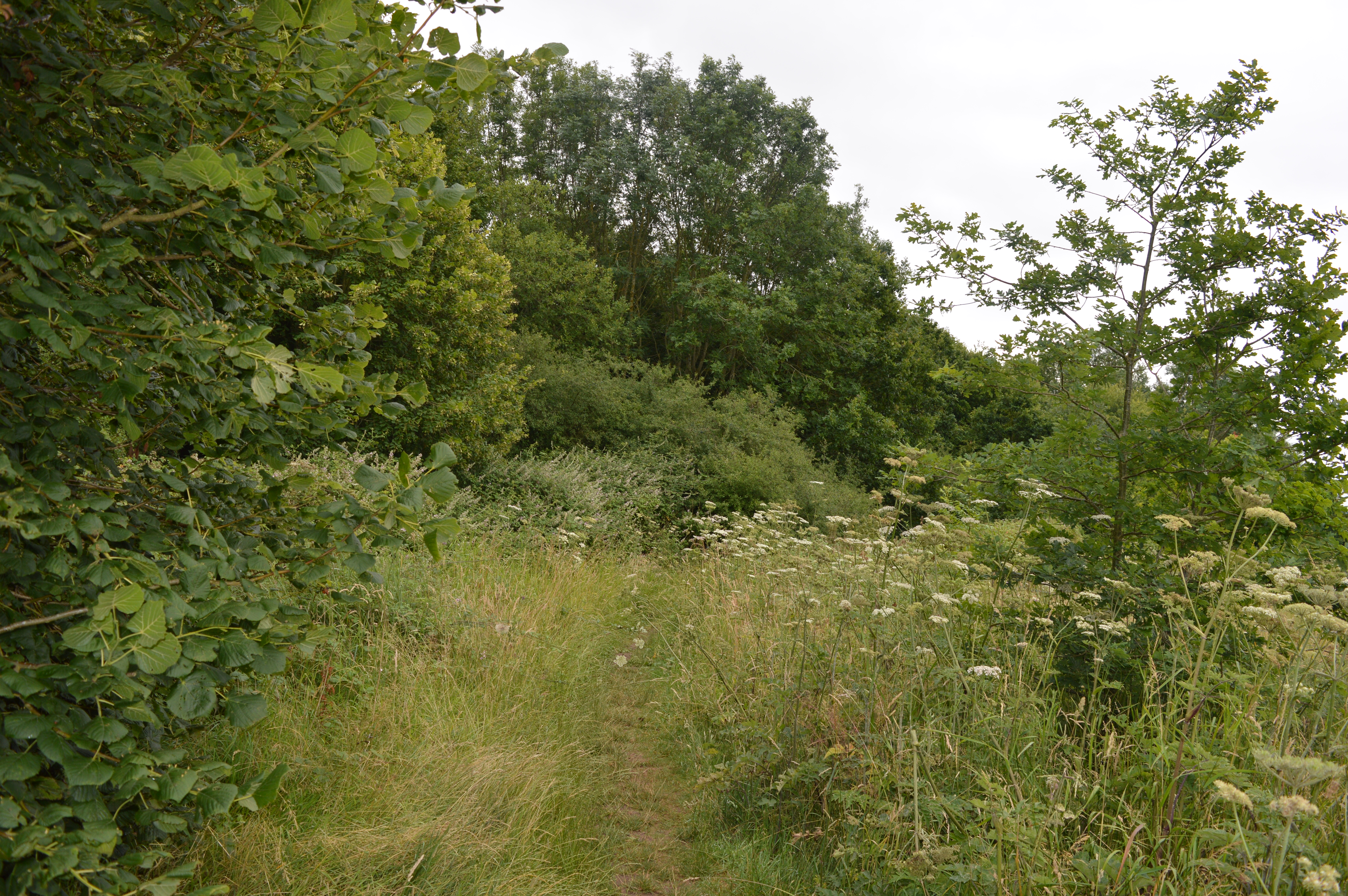

Wheathampstead Local Nature Reserve is a 5.9 hectare Local Nature Reserve (LNR) in Wheathampstead in Hertfordshire. It was declared an LNR by St Albans City Council in 2002, and is leased by Wheathampstead Parish Council from Hertfordshire County Council.

The L-shaped site borders football pitches. There is ash woodland, thorn scrub and mature hedgerows, together with an area of rough grassland. There are birds such as grass vetchling and bee orchid, birds including yellowhammer and whitethroat, and many butterflies.

There is access from the Wheathampstead Development Centre and by a gate on the B651 south of Butterfield Road.
