= Prestwick Road Meadows =

Nature reserve in South Oxhey, Hertfordshire, England

Coordinates: 51.6176°N 0.388°W

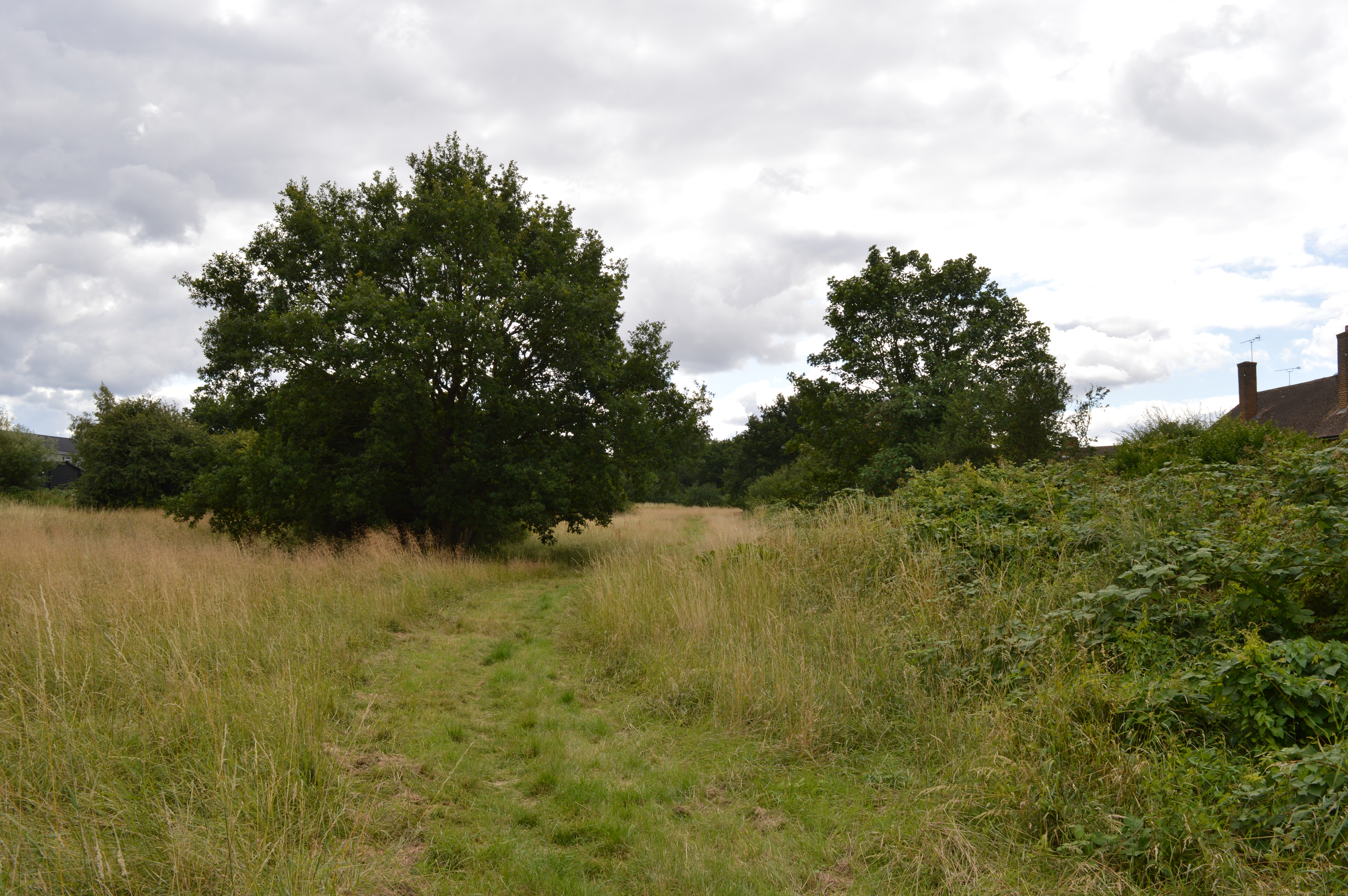

Prestwick Road Meadows is a 2.8 hectare Local Nature Reserve in South Oxhey in Hertfordshire. It is owned and managed by Three Rivers District Council.

This site was formerly farm meadows. It has many insects and flowers include purple knapweed, yellow birdsfoot-trefoil and red clover. Old hedgerows still survive, and there is also a seasonal pond where frogs breed in the spring.

There is access from Prestwick Road between Little Oxhey Lane and Heysham Drive.
