= The Lairage Land =

Nature reserve in Watford, Hertfordshire, England

Coordinates: 51.6448°N 0.4059°W

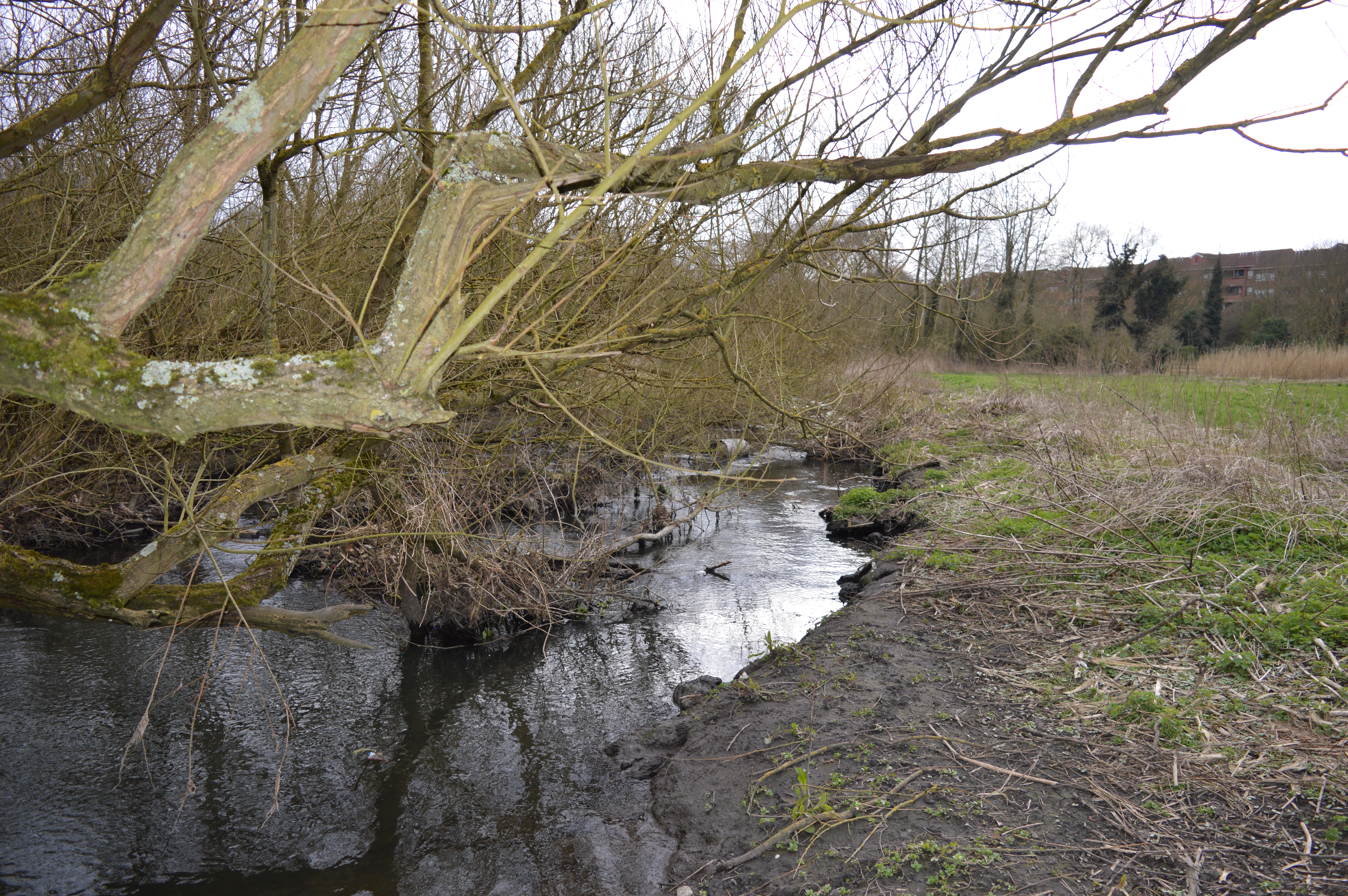
The River Colne with The Lairage Land on the right

The Lairage Land is a 4.4 hectare Local Nature Reserve in Watford in Hertfordshire. It is owned and managed by Watford Borough Council.

The site is mainly rough grassland, with some woodland and scrub. The River Colne runs along its southern boundary, with stream water crowfoot and yellow water lily growing in the stream. There are birds such as whitethroats and green woodpeckers, gatekeeper and small tortoiseshell butterflies, and Roesel's bush-crickets.

There is access from Jellicoe Road.
