= Weston Hills, Baldock =

Local nature reserve in Hertfordshire, England

Coordinates: 51.8042°N 0.18189°W

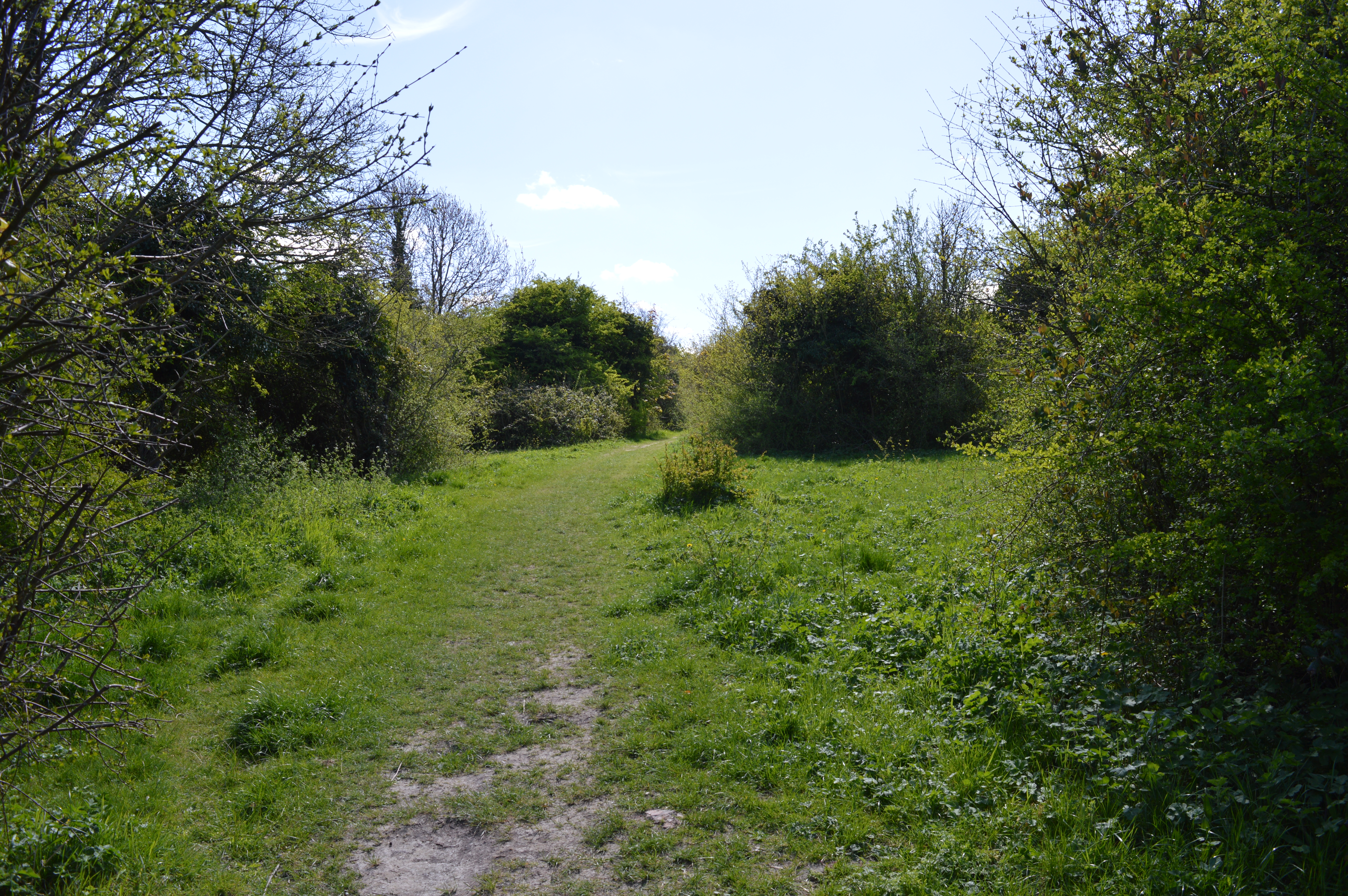

Weston Hills is a 17 hectare Local Nature Reserve in Baldock in North Hertfordshire. It is owned by Hertfordshire County Council and North Hertfordshire District Council (NHDC) and managed by NHDC. The site has grassland, woodland and mixed scrub. Six hectares is chalk grassland, and this is its most important ecological feature and one of the best examples in Hertfordshire; plants are very diverse because the harsh conditions do not allow vigorous species to become dominant. Plants include autumn gentian, clustered bellflower, harebell and six species of orchid. There are slowworms, common lizards and many species of butterfly. Some chalk quarries date back to the Roman period, and there are also ancient earthworks.

There is access from Chiltern Road, Ivel Way and Limekiln Lane, and from the Icknield Way Path.
