= Loudwater, Hertfordshire =

Housing estate in Hertfordshire, England

Coordinates: 51.657442°N 0.481164°W

Loudwater
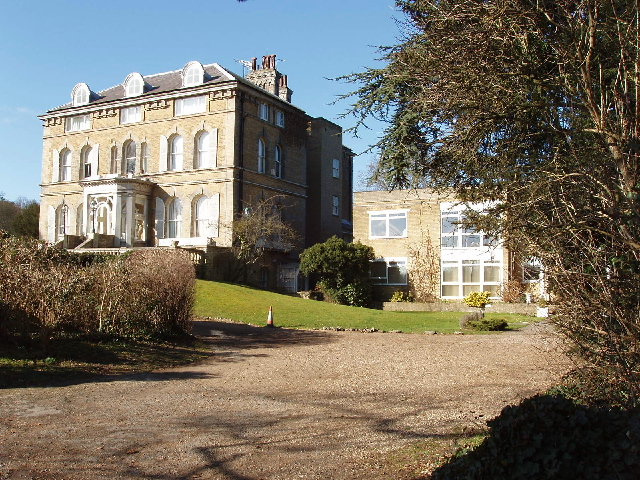
- Glen Chess, Loudwater

- Location within Hertfordshire
- Population: 1,242 (2001 census)
- OS grid reference: TQ050965
- Civil parish: Chorleywood
- District: Three Rivers
- Shire county: Hertfordshire
- Region: East
- Country: England
- Sovereign state: United Kingdom
- Post town: Rickmansworth
- Postcode district: WD3
- Dialling code: 01923
- Police: Hertfordshire
- Fire: Hertfordshire
- Ambulance: East of England
- UK Parliament: South West Hertfordshire

Loudwater is a private housing estate in the parish of Chorleywood, separated from the latter by the River Chess, north of Rickmansworth, Hertfordshire and just to the east of Junction 18 of the M25 motorway. Loudwater is an old name for the River Chess. The 2001 population was 1,242.

== History ==
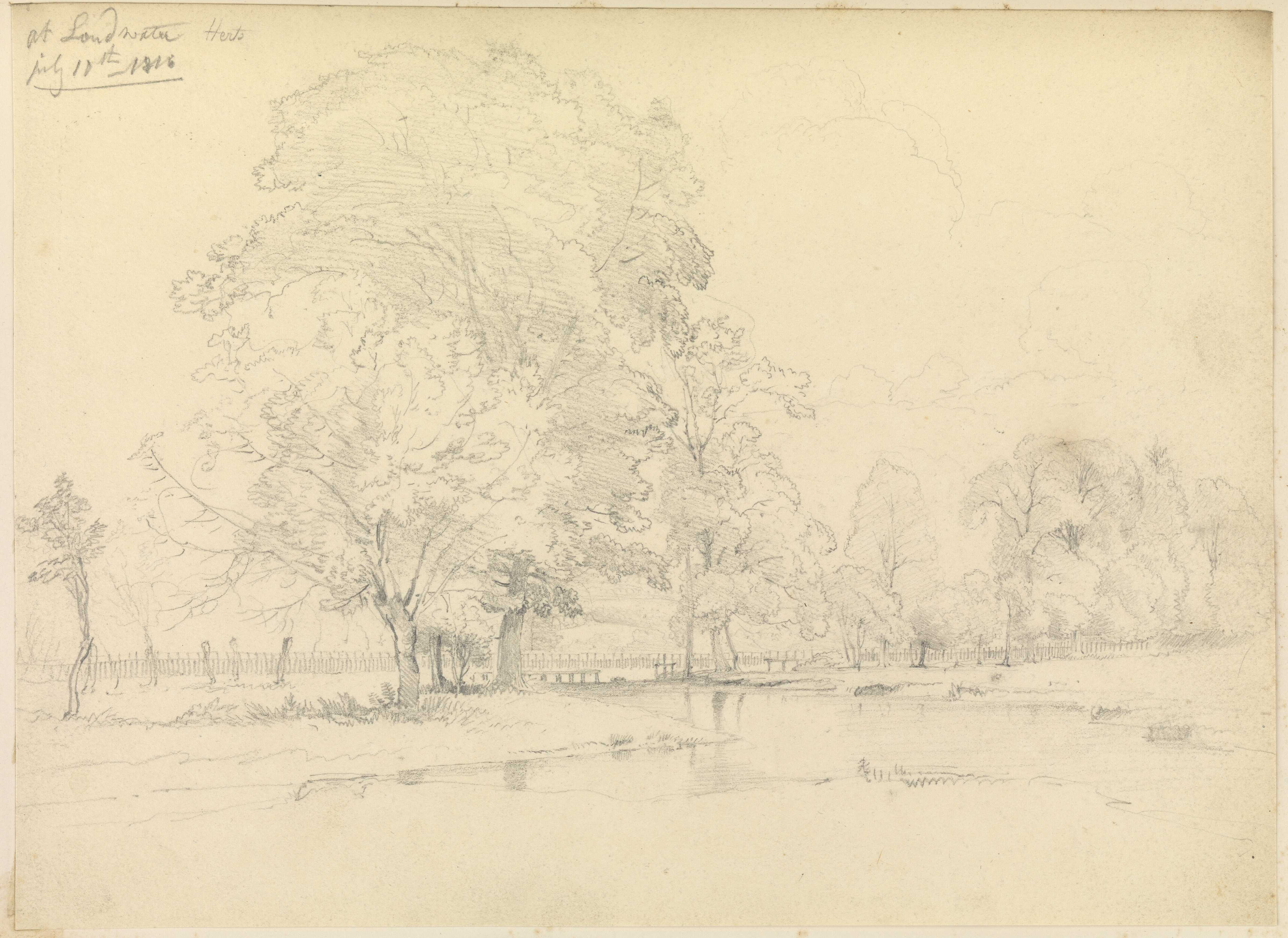
1816 sketch by John Christian Schetky of the river Chess at Loudwater

Archaeological finds of pottery, tiles and coins at Loudwater Farm indicate that it may be the site of a villa and water mill occupied by Germanic settlers in the 4th and 5th centuries AD. In the mid-19th century a paper mill was established in Loudwater using new technology developed by George Tidcombe. The mill was still standing in 2008.

The present estate was built over approximately 20 years from 1939 on plots from the grounds of Loudwater House (see below) and now is a conservation area. There are approximately 450 dwellings, and there is no pub, shop or community focus, but there is a residents' association.

In 2002, nearly a quarter of the residents were millionaires, the highest concentration of any community in the United Kingdom. The average house price in April 2020 was £1,620,296.

As of April 2020 the Lord Lieutenant of Hertfordshire is Robert Voss CBE, a resident of Loudwater with his wife Celia.

== Loudwater House ==
Loudwater House in Loudwater, which had a park of 150 acres (60 ha), contained a pioneering central heating system in 1837. It was later occupied by Joseph d'Aguilar Samuda, MP. The house was converted into eleven flats in the mid-20th century.
