= Garston Park =

Watford suburb recreation

Coordinates: 51.691°N 0.3796°W

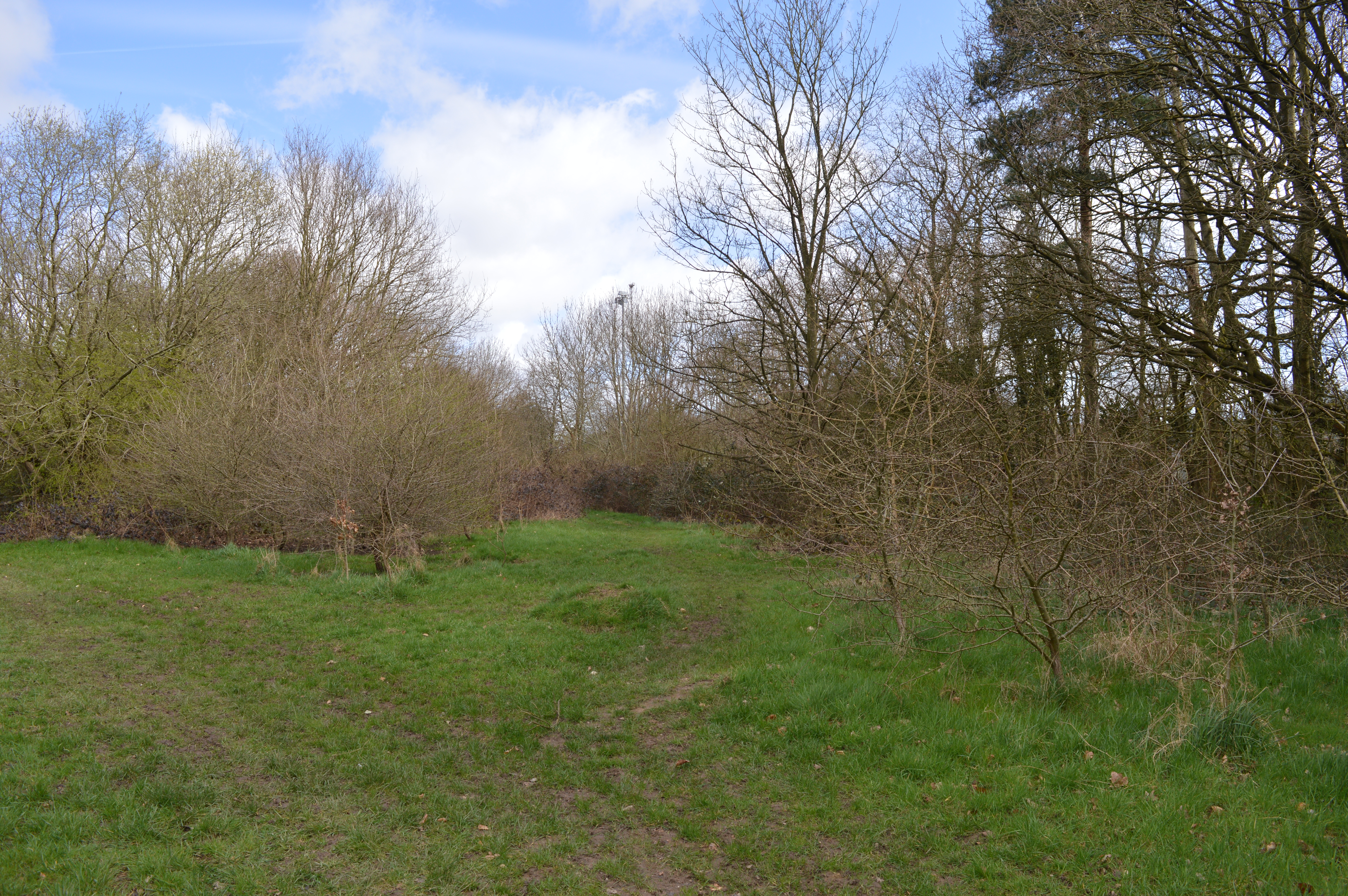
Garston Park Local Nature Reserve

Garston Park is a park in Garston, Hertfordshire, a suburb of Watford in Hertfordshire. An area of 6.4 hectares, about half of the park, is a Local Nature Reserve. It is owned and managed by Watford Borough Council.

The nature reserve has woodland which is mainly oak, ash and sycamore. There are also areas of grassland and wetland, which has lesser pond sedge and reed canary grass. Mammals include muntjac deer, red foxes and pipistrelle bats, and there are birds including great spotted and green woodpeckers and several species of butterflies. The park outside the nature reserve is mown grass which has a children's playground and an exercise area.

There is access from Garston Lane and Coates Way.
