= Croxley Common Moor =

Nature reserve in Hertfordshire, England

Coordinates: 51.6425°N 0.43628°W

- Site of Special Scientific Interest
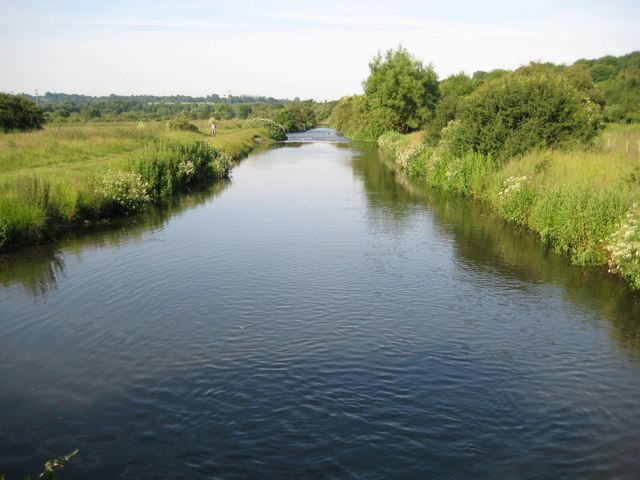
- The river Gade passing through Croxley Common Moor
- Location of Croxley Common Moor.
- Area of search: Hertfordshire
- Grid reference: TQ083949
- Interest: Biological
- Area: 39.5 ha (98 acres)
- Notification date: 1986
- Location map: Magic Map

Croxley Common Moor is a 39.5-hectare (98-acre) biological Site of Special Scientific Interest (SSSI) and Local Nature Reserve in Croxley Green, Hertfordshire. It is owned by Three Rivers District Council and managed by the council together with the Countryside Management Service and the Friends of Croxley Common Moor. Most of it is a registered common.

The site is mainly grass heathland with some ancient woodland and hazel coppice. It has been designated an SSSI for its botanical interest, and over 250 species of plants have been recorded. Principal species include sheep sorrel, common bent and sheep's fescue. There is also abundant sweet vernal grass and harebell. There are many ant hills made by yellow meadow ants.

The moor can be accessed from the Ebury Way, a foot/cycle route which borders it to the south, and by a footbridge across the River Gade, which borders it to the north, from Mill Lane, close to Croxley tube station.

== See also ==
- List of Sites of Special Scientific Interest in Hertfordshire
