= Chorleywood House Estate =

Local Nature Reserve in Hertfordshire, England

Coordinates: 51.6631°N 0.5021°W

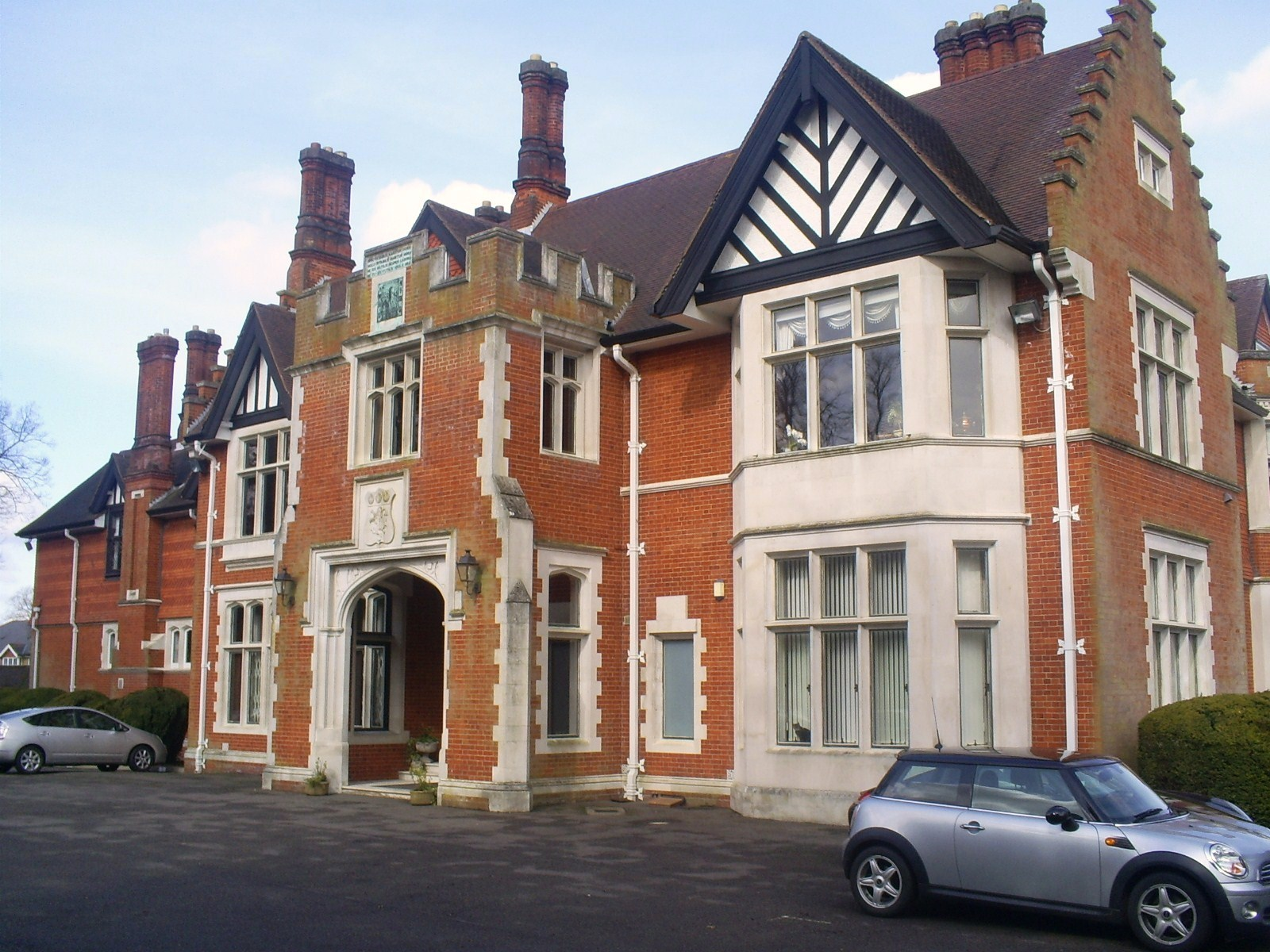
The main frontage of Chorleywood House

Chorleywood House Estate is a 64.3 hectare Local Nature Reserve in Chorleywood in Hertfordshire. It is owned and managed by Three Rivers District Council, and the declaring authority is Hertfordshire County Council.

It was designated a Local Nature Reserve in 2007.

The River Chess runs through the estate which has formal parkland, meadows and mature woodland. Protected species include coralroot bittercress. Chorleywood Dell is a key neutral grassland site in the Biodiversity Action Plan for Hertfordshire. The gardens surround the 200-year-old manor house and summer house.

There is access from Common Road.

== The house ==
A Regency mansion called Chorleywood House was built here in 1822 by John Barnes, replacing an earlier farm house. In 1892, the house was bought by Lady Ela Russell, a relative of the Duke of Bedford and she modified and enlarged the house. In June 1940, the mansion and land were bought by the Chorleywood Urban District Council, together with Hertfordshire County Council and London County Council and designated a public open space. During World War Two, the mansion housed evacuees from London. Chorleywood UDC then adopted the house for their offices and the Public Library was housed here. Tenants lived in flats in the upper storeys. When Chorleywood UDC devolved to become Three Rivers DC in 1974 the mansion was entirely converted into flats which are now leased privately. The grounds remain a public open space.

== John Barnes ==
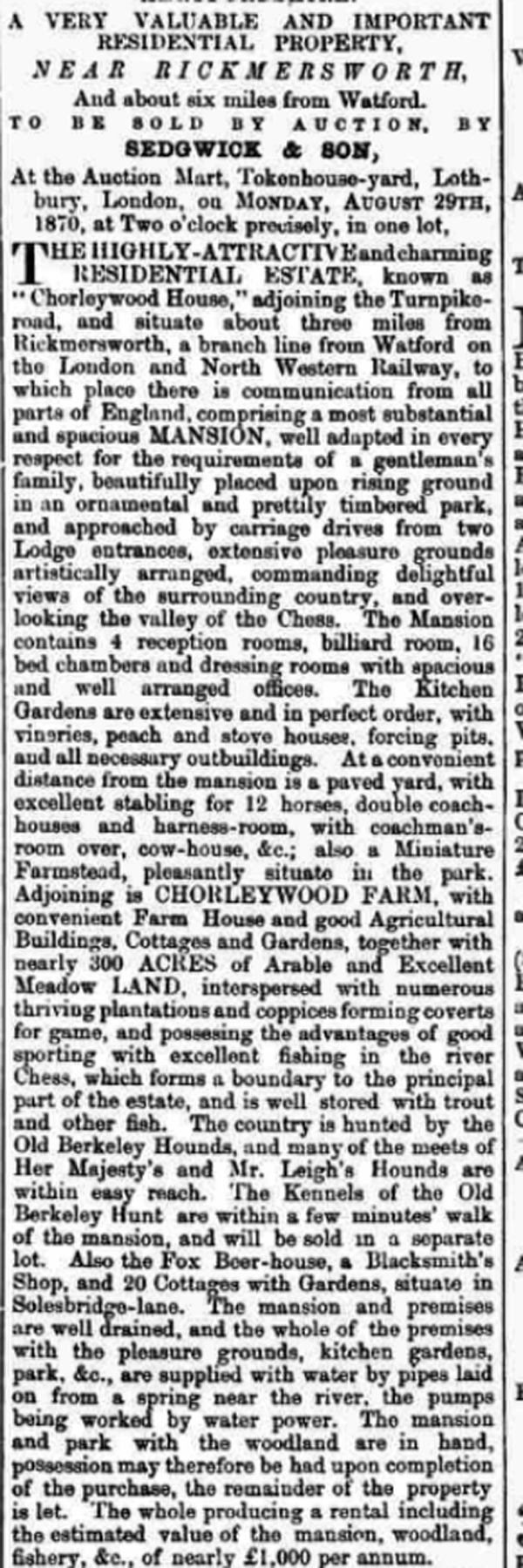
Sale notice of Chorleywood House in 1870

John Barnes (1791–1866) built Chorleywood House in 1822. John was born in England in 1791. In 1824 he married Sarah Medley (1803–1872) who was the daughter of Charles Medley a partner in the banking firm Barnes and Medley. John also became a banker in this firm and became extremely wealthy. He was also for some time a Director of the Union Bank of London and of the Buckinghamshire Railway Company.

The couple had eleven children, one of whom was Colonel Osmond Barnes who was a notable military commander. John died on 13 February 1866 in Bayswater, London and in 1870 the property was advertised for sale by his sons. An extract from the advertisement is as follows.

"The highly attractive and charming residential estate known as Chorleywood House adjoining the Turnpike road …comprising a most substantial and spacious mansion well adapted in every respect for the requirements of a gentleman’s family beautifully placed upon rising ground in an ornamental and prettily timbered park and approached by carriage drives from two Lodge entrances. Extensive pleasure grounds artistically arranged commanding delightful views of the surrounding country and overlooking the valley of the Chess.

The mansion contains four reception rooms, billiard room, 16 bed chambers and dressing rooms with spacious and well-arranged offices. The kitchen gardens are extensive and in perfect order vineries, peach and stove houses, forcing pits and all necessary outbuildings." The house was bought by Howard Gilliatt.

== Residents between 1870 and 1890 ==
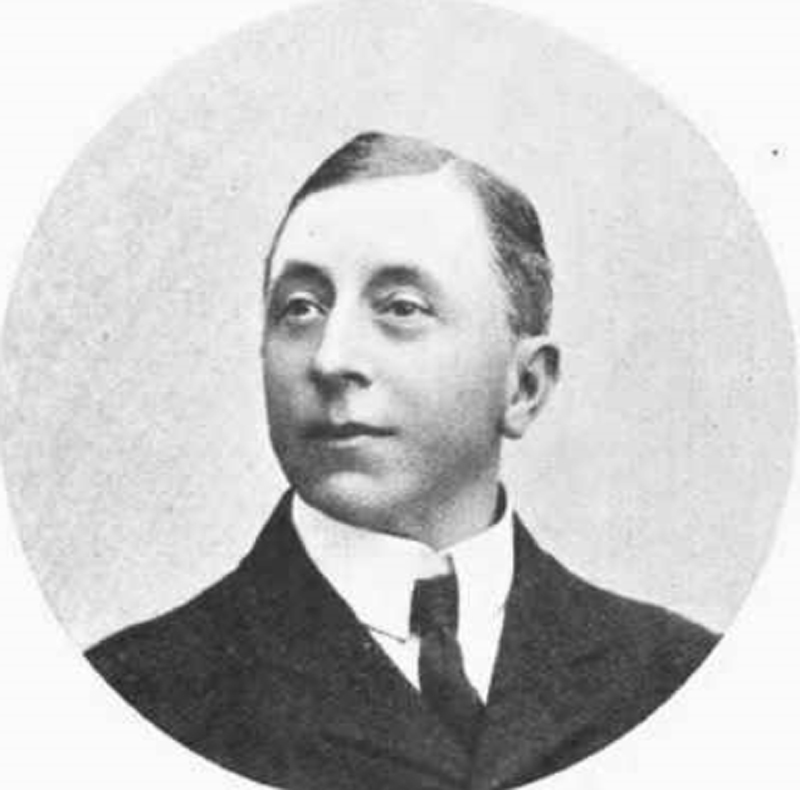
Harding Cox

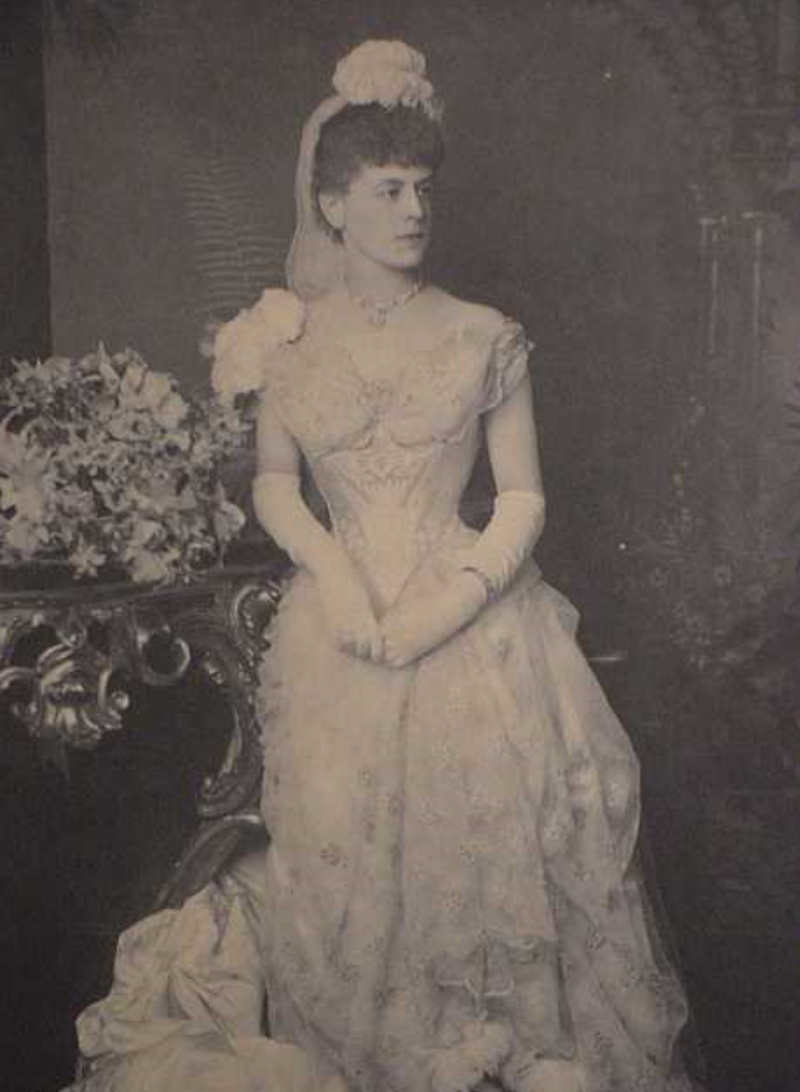
Hebe Gertrude Barlow, wife of Harding Cox

Howard Gilliatt who was the cousin of the Lord of the Manor of Rickmansworth lived in the house for about three years and then rented it. The next resident was George James Robinson (1830-1907) who was a London solicitor. He was born in 1830 in Holloway Middlesex. In 1852 he married Anne Hewett Osmond and they had one daughter. In 1881 he bought the adjoining Roughwood Estate and then Blacketts farm. He then proceeded to develop the whole area as one property. In 1887 he built Roughwood Park and moved there with his family. Chorleywood House was sold to Harding Cox.

Harding Edward de Fonblanque Cox (1854-1944) was born in 1854 in Bloomsbury. His father Edward William Cox was a lawyer and very successful publisher of several journals and newspapers. He amassed a large fortune and when he died in 1879 his son Harding at the age of only 15 inherited a great deal of money. Harding was a very keen sportsman and excelled at shooting, cricket, rowing and hunting. When he left Cambridge University he became a lawyer and busied himself with literary, dramatic and journalist pursuits. He was very interested in the theatre and it was here that he met his future wife Hebe Gertrude Barlow (1861-1938), a soprano and well known actress.

The couple had three children one of whom was born at Chorleywood House. In 1892 he sold the property to Lady Ela Russell.

== Lady Ela Russell ==
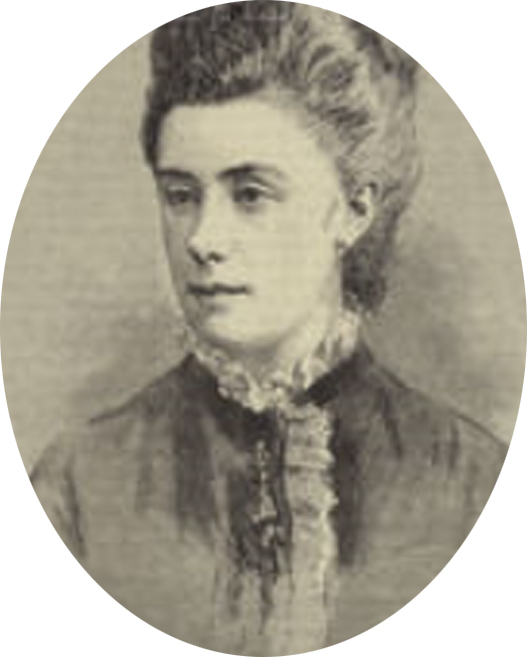
Lady Ela Russell, 1879.

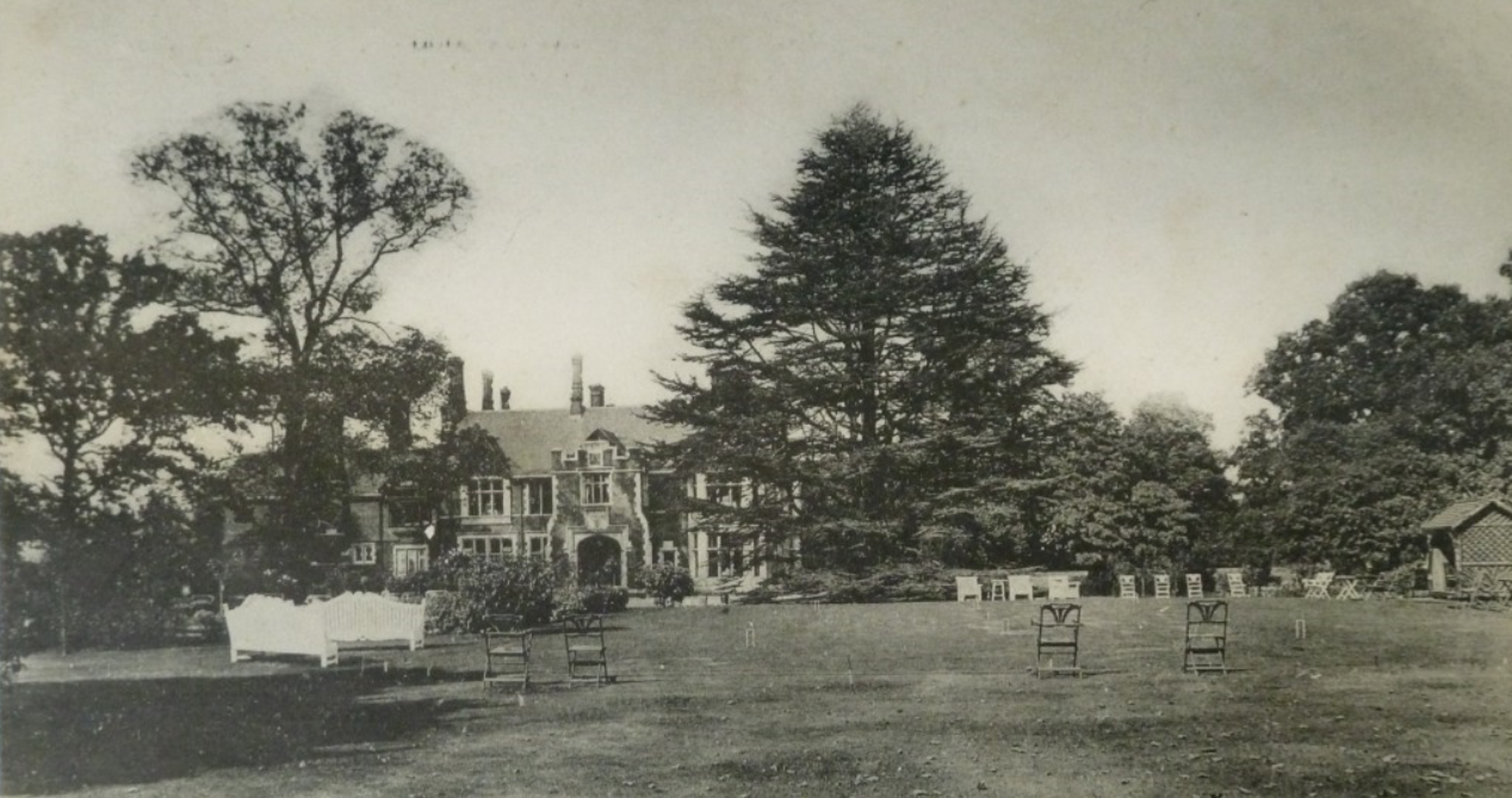
Chorleywood House in 1904 at the time Lady Ela Russell lived there.

Lady Ella Monica Sackville Russell (1854-1936) was born in 1854 in Buckhurst Park in Sussex, the childhood home of her mother Elizabeth Sackville West. Her father was Francis Charles Hastings Russell, 9th Duke of Bedford. She lived at Woburn Abbey, which was the ancestral home of the Dukes of Bedford, for many years and did not marry. Her father died in 1891 and she inherited a large amount of money. In the following year she bought Chorleywood House and started a long program of extensive renovations and additions. She modified and enlarged the house. She also developed the estate to be virtually self-sufficient, with her own farms and market garden. She created formal gardens and parkland, and built cottages for her chauffeur and gardener behind the house. In addition she installed electricity using her own generator housed in a building near the summerhouse. Besides owning Chorleywood House she also had a London town house in Princes Gate. She also had an interest in art and painted many notable pictures some of which were recently sold at Christies.

She was very close to her only sister Ermyntrude Malet (1856-1927) who was widowed in 1908. Her husband had been Sir Edward Baldwin Malet. Her great nephew Ian Russell, 13th Duke of Bedford remembered both of them in his autobiography published in 1959. He said:

"The boredom of our normal routine was only relieved by two great-aunts, sisters of my grandfather. They both lived in large houses one at Bexhill and one at Chorleywood. They always had us to stay every year, sometimes twice a year. Both of them lived in a very grand manner, with great houses full of housemaids and parlourmaids, just as they had been brought up at Woburn. They were just as eccentric as my family is supposed to be. The one at Bexhill was called Lady Ermyntrude Malet and she had peppered the estate with ruins, towers and follies. I have very warm memories of her as she used to give me ten shillings a day pocket-money. Her sister Lady Ela Russell was an old maid who lived entirely alone with her horde of servants. The Chorleywood House had been built to her own design."

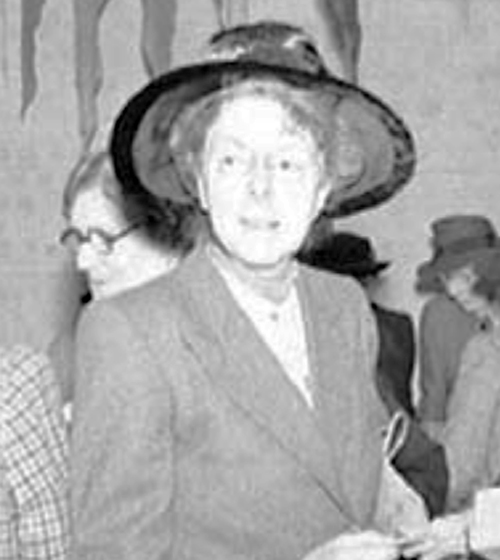
Lady Romola Russell in 1946

The magazine “The Gentlewoman and Modern Life” mentioned the two sisters in 1916 in the following terms.

"The Duke of Bedford’s sisters Lady Ela Russell and Lady Ermyntrude Malet now spend most of their time in London. Lady Ela lives in a large house in Princes Gate and in rather stately style, but even before the war she kept parlourmaids. She is a keen business women, well read and a fine linguist and is said to have learned Chinese."

Ermyntrude died in 1927 and Ela continued to live at Chorleywood House and to run the Estate. She died in 1936 and left the property to her first cousin Lady Romola Russell (1879-1966) who was also unmarried.

Lady Romola’s full name was Augusta Louise Margaret Romola Villiers Russell. She was the daughter of Odo William Leopold Russell, 1st Baron Ampthill who was Ela’s uncle, the younger brother of her father the 9th Duke of Bedford. Romola lived in the house for six months and then sold it in about 1940. After the War it was acquired by Chorleywood Urban District Council.
