= Hilfield Park Reservoir =

Nature reserve in Hertfordshire, England

Coordinates: 51.6491°N 0.3276°W

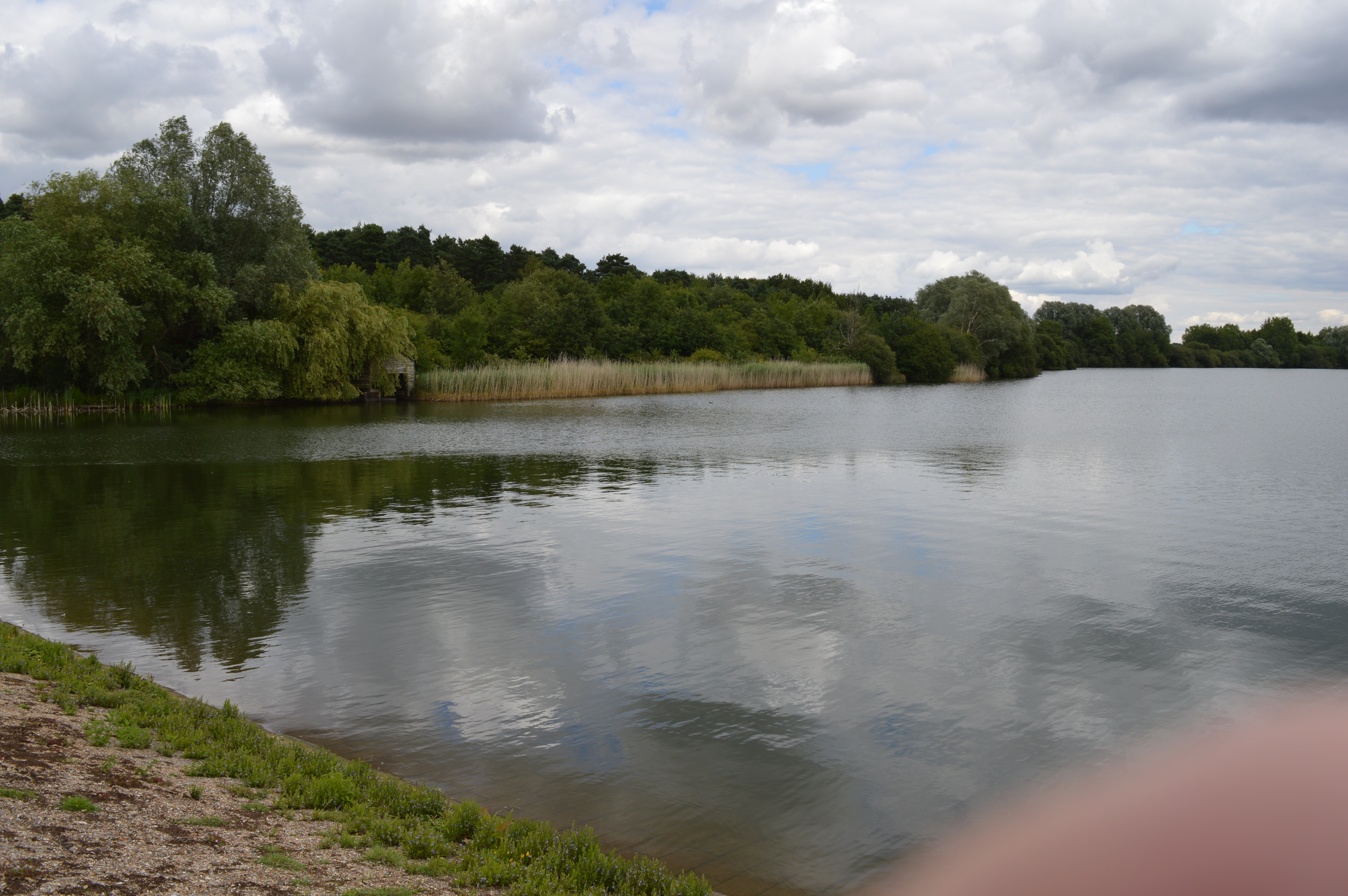

Hilfield Park Reservoir is a 76.3 ha (189 acres) construction built in 1953 between Bushey and Elstree in Hertfordshire, and owned by Affinity Water. Declared a Local Nature Reserve (LNR) in 1969, it is managed by the Herts and Middlesex Wildlife Trust (HMWT). It is the oldest LNR in Hertfordshire.

This large reservoir is home to a wide range of bird species. It is of national importance for pochards, tufted ducks and common tern, and it is also significant for mallards, shovellers and teal. The margins have marshy areas with many breeding birds and marsh plants, such as reedmace and reed canarygrass. In 2011 an eastern crowned warbler was caught and ringed, only the second to be found in Britain.

The site is kept locked and access is restricted to HMWT members.
