= Sherrardspark Wood =

Biological SSSI in Hertfordshire, England

Coordinates: 51.81021°N 0.21724°W

- Site of Special Scientific Interest
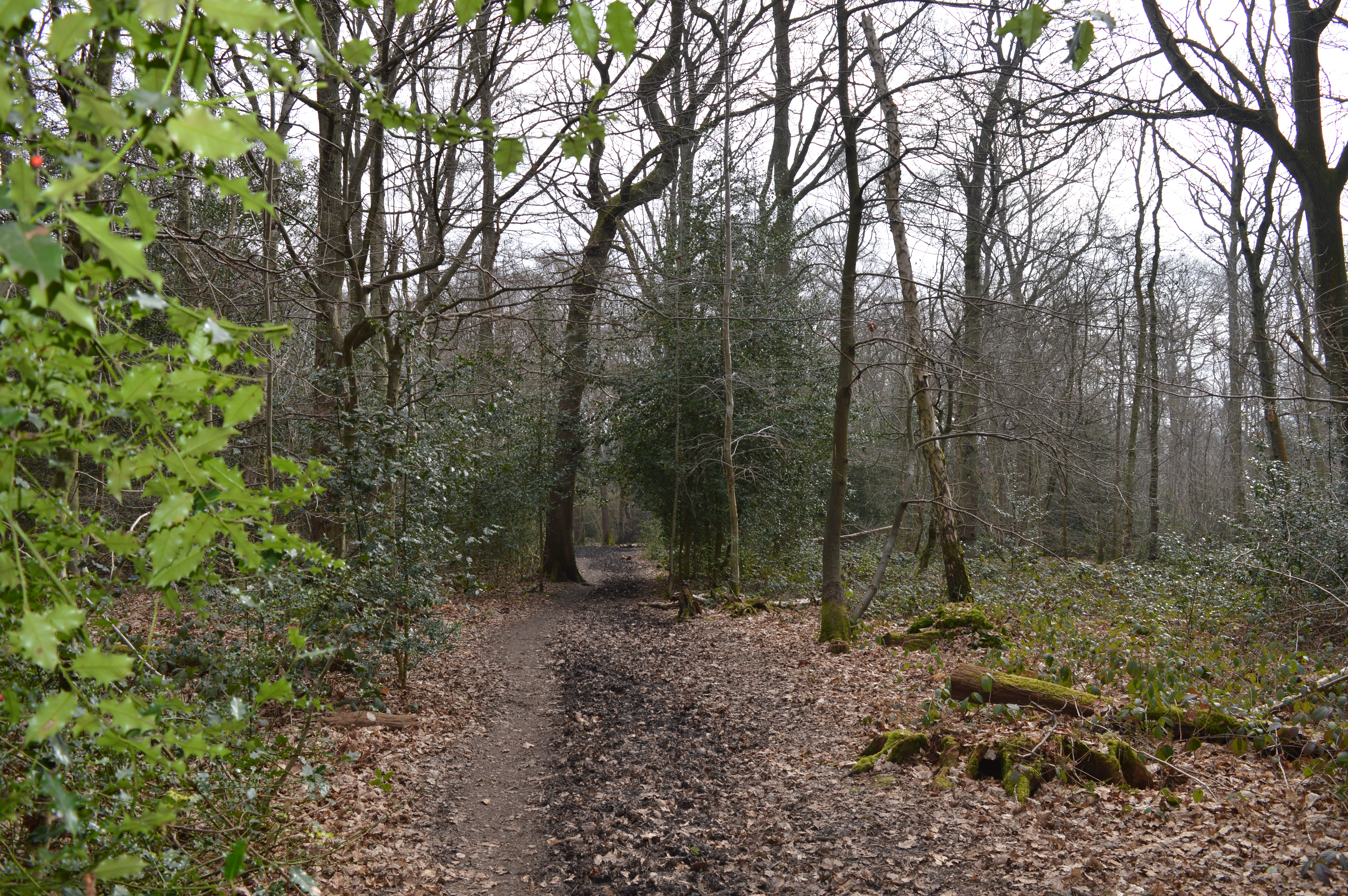
- Location of Sherrardspark Wood.
- Area of search: Hertfordshire
- Grid reference: TL230139
- Interest: Biological
- Area: 74.9 ha (185 acres)
- Notification date: 1986
- Location map: Natural England

Sherrardspark Wood (grid reference TL230139) is a 74.9 hectares (185 acres) biological site of Special Scientific Interest in Welwyn Garden City, Hertfordshire. The site was notified in 1986 under the Wildlife and Countryside Act 1981.

It is located to the northwest of Welwyn Garden City and is an ancient woodland consisting mainly of Sessile oak and Hornbeam. It is used by dog walkers, joggers, cyclists, and horse riders. The area was designated by English Nature as a Site of Special Scientific Interest in 1986 as well as a Local Nature Reserve in 1998. The Sherrardspark Wood Wardens' Society assists with the maintenance of the wood.

There are several walks through the wood, one of which follows the disused Luton/Dunstable branch line from Welwyn Garden City railway station. This line closed in the 1970s and runs from the White Bridge on Digswell Road west and then north to the Great North Road next to the A1(M) motorway, close to the Red Lion pub. The trail continues from Ayot St Peter on the other side of the motorway along Ayot Greenway.
