= Furzefield Wood and Lower Halfpenny Bottom =

Nature reserve in Hertfordshire, England

Coordinates: 51.7057°N 0.204°W

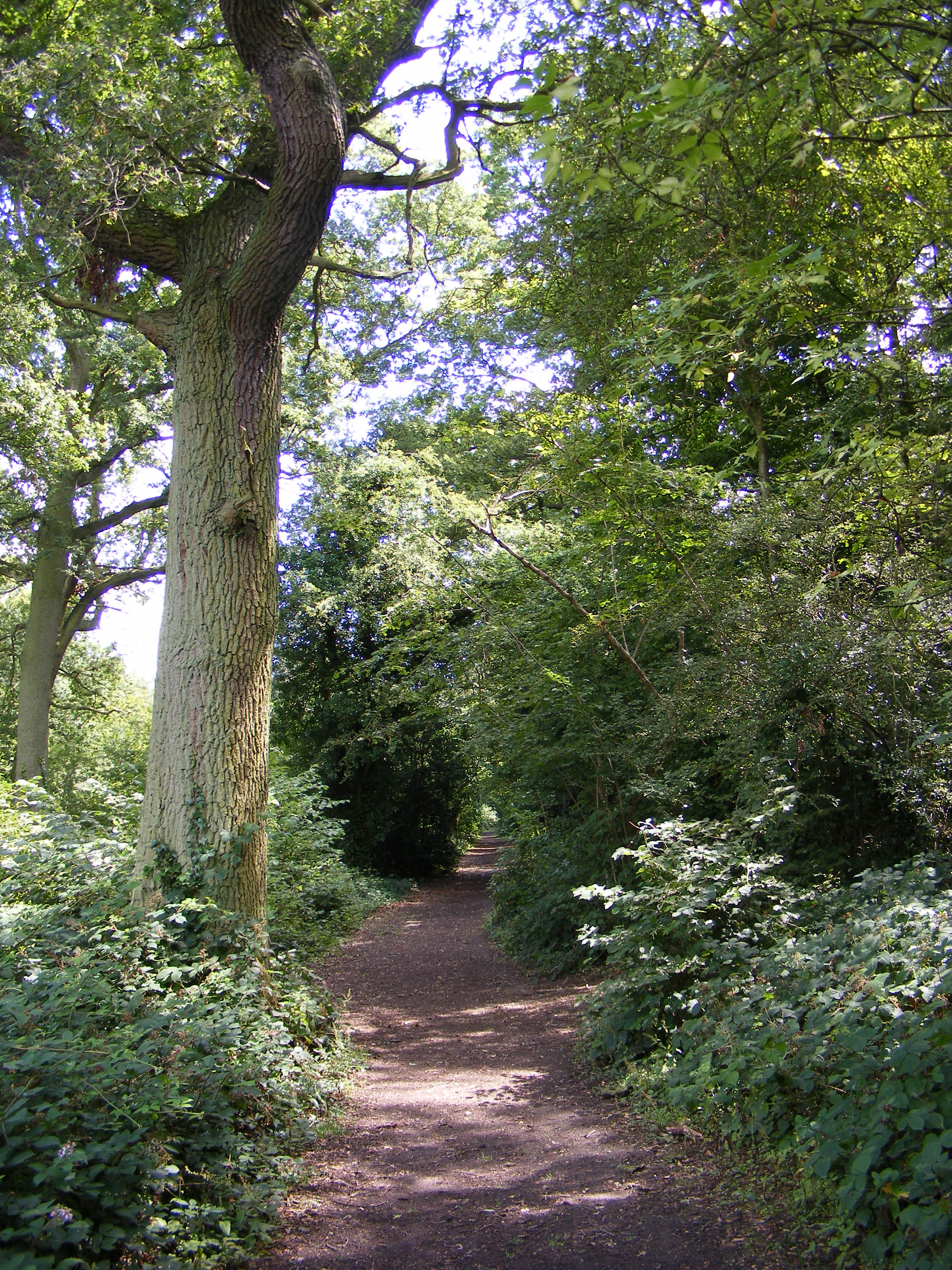
Path in Furzefield Wood

Furzefield Wood and Lower Halfpenny is a 7.4 hectare Local Nature Reserve in Potters Bar in Hertfordshire. It is owned and managed by Hertsmere Borough Council.

The site is part of a parcel of land purchased in 1935 by Potters Bar Urban District Council. The southern area became the King George V Playing Fields, which are used for recreation, while the wood and meadow are managed for wildlife. Furze is an ancient name for gorse, and the wood has been managed for coppicing for over 300 years. It now provides a habitat for birds, and fallen branches are important for invertebrates. Lower Halfpenny Bottom is a meadow which was once the route of an old drovers' track.

There is access from Cranbourne Avenue.
