= Oxleys Wood =

Nature reserve in Hatfield, Hertfordshire, England

Coordinates: 51.7509°N 0.2232°W

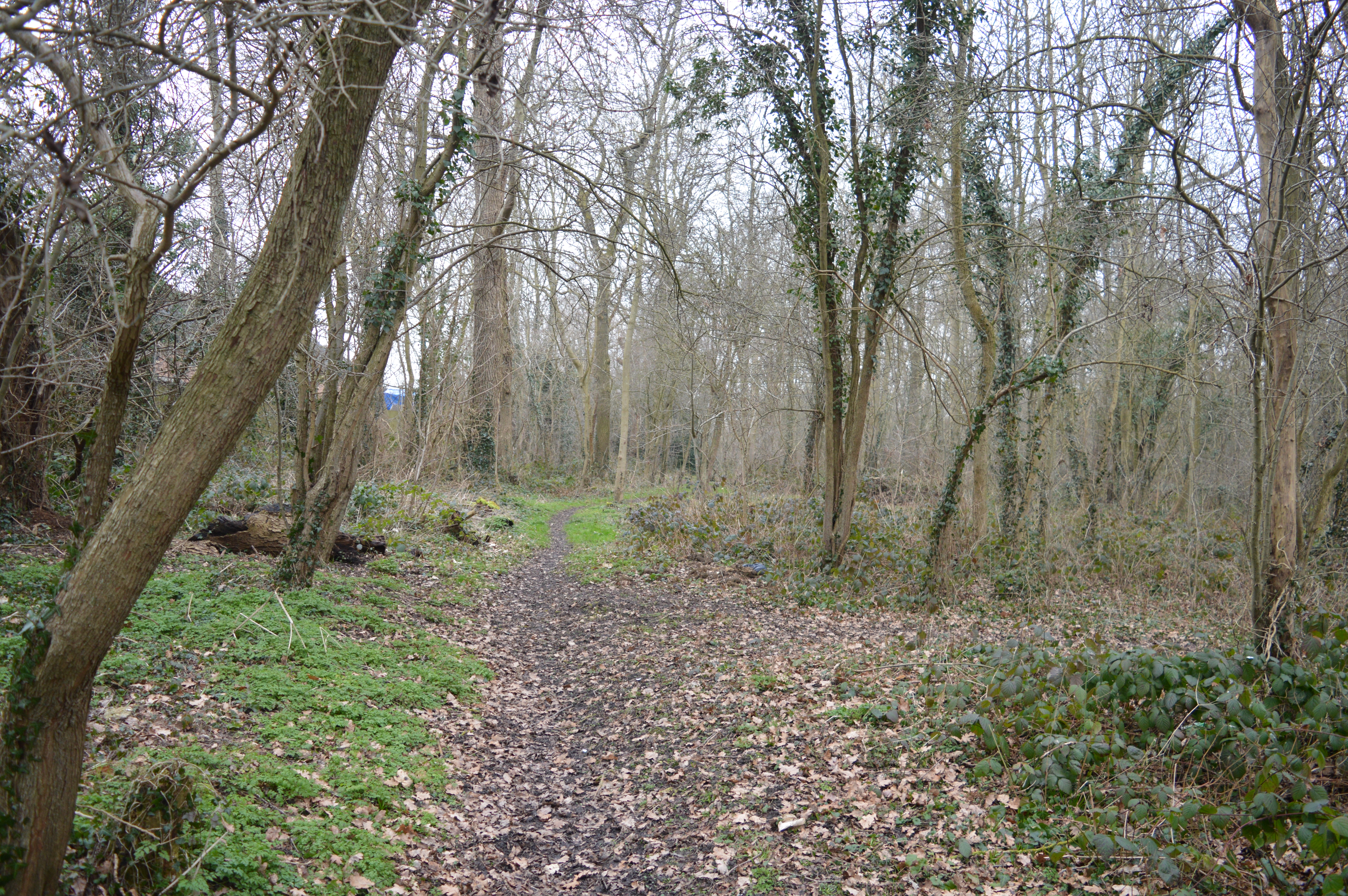

Oxleys Wood is a 1.2 hectare Local Nature Reserve in Hatfield in Hertfordshire. The declaring authority is Welwyn Hatfield Borough Council. The wood floods in wet weather, particularly the northern part, which has a pond. Tree species include oak, ash, elm and willow, and they provide a habitat for insects which provide food for birds.

There is access from Deerswood Avenue opposite Badgers Way.
