= Fisher's Field =

Nature reserve in Hertfordshire, England

Coordinates: 51.6941°N 0.3983°W

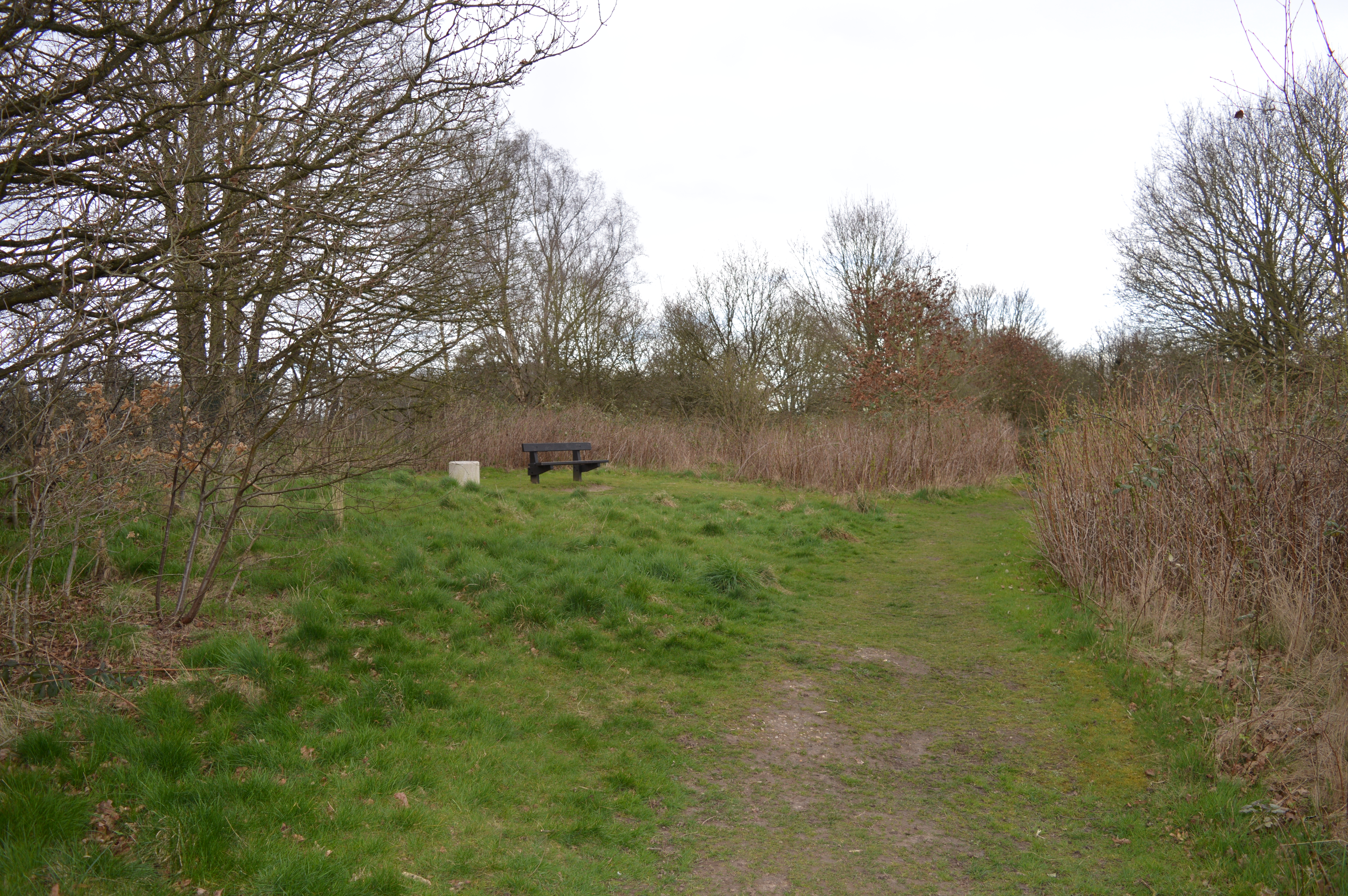

Fisher's Field is a 1.8 hectare Local Nature Reserve (LNR) in Bushey in Hertfordshire. It is owned and managed by Hertsmere Borough Council.

The site was used for grazing cattle before the Second World War, when it was converted to allotments to assist in increasing food production. The allotments eventually fell into disuse, and in 1994 Hertsmere Council proposed to build houses on the site. Residents objected that it fell within the Watling Chase Community Forest and the Green Belt, and that it should therefore be preserved for wildlife. The council agreed, and in 1998 Fisher's Field became an LNR.

There are areas of woodland, with trees including oak, rowan and wild cherry, and a wildflower meadow and scrub with bramble, raspberry and willow herb. Animals include green woodpecker, shrews and bees. The Friends of Fisher's Field assist the council in maintaining and improving the site.

There is access from Fisher's Close and Park Close.
