= Shrubhill Common =

Nature Reserve in the United Kingdom

Coordinates: 51.7539°N 0.502°W

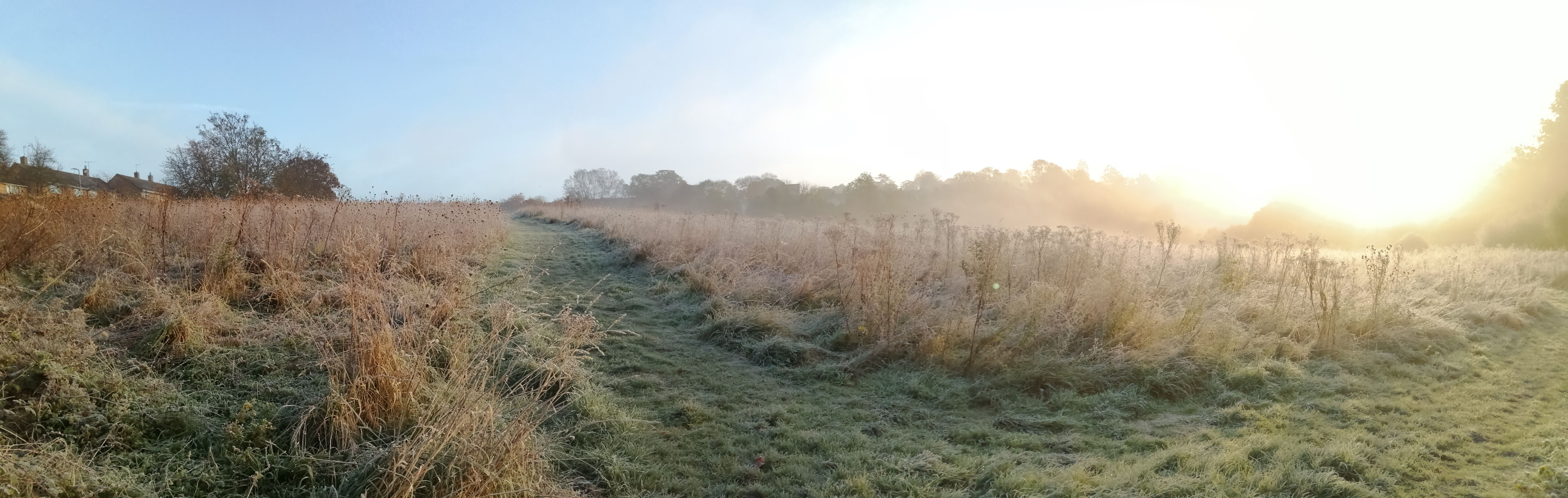

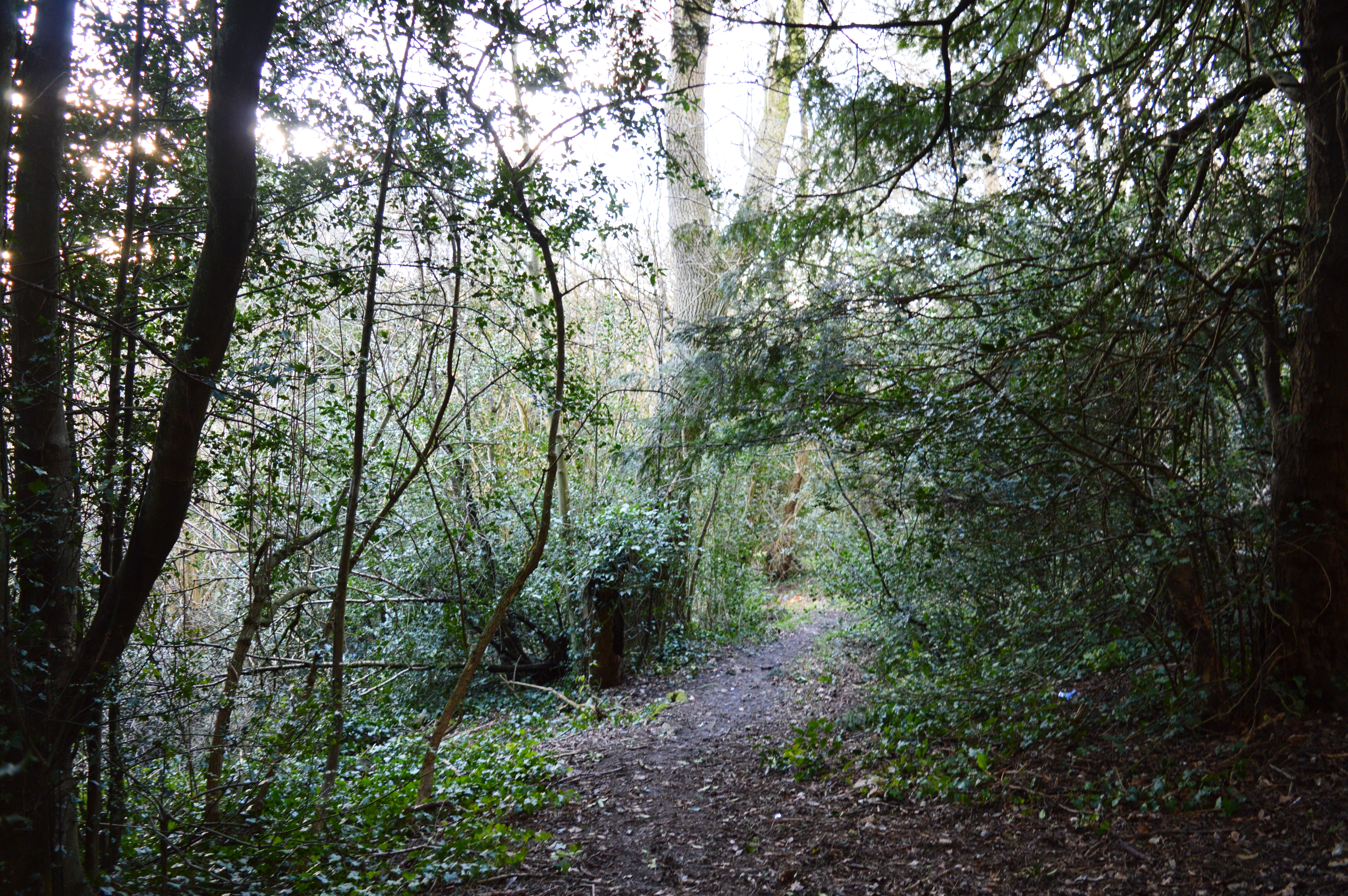

Shrubhill Common is a 9.8 hectare Local Nature Reserve in Hemel Hempstead in Hertfordshire, England. It was Dacorum's first Local Nature reserve, its LNR status being declared on 10 October 1995. and it is still owned and managed by Dacorum Borough Council. The site is common land, and it is part of the Chilterns Area of Outstanding Natural Beauty.

The common is woodland and scrub, together with two fields which are chalk grassland. Previously horse grazed, the site is now maintained by mowing.

There are over 100 species of wild flowers, and herbs such as marjoram and basil. In 2014 23 species of butterfly were recorded, including marbled whites. On 26 May 2023, it was recorded over 10 species of butterfly.

There is access from Shrub Hill Road.
