= Chorleywood Common =

Nature reserve in Hertfordshire, England

Coordinates: 51.6631°N 0.5021°W

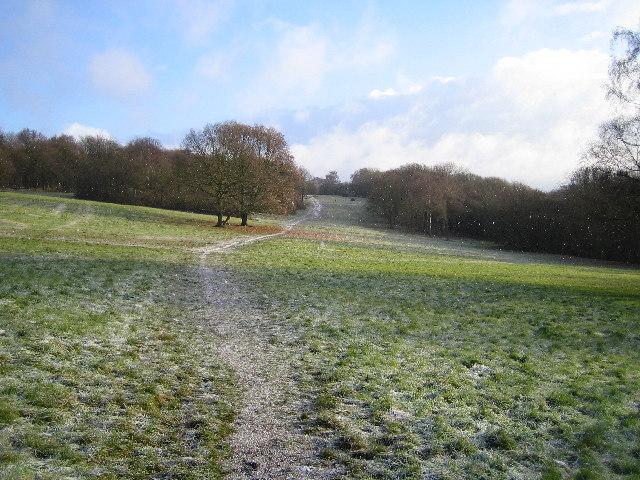

Chorleywood Common is a 75.6 hectare Local Nature Reserve in Chorleywood in Hertfordshire. It is owned and managed by Chorleywood Parish Council, and the declaring authority is Hertfordshire County Council. The common is part of the Chilterns Area of Outstanding Natural Beauty.

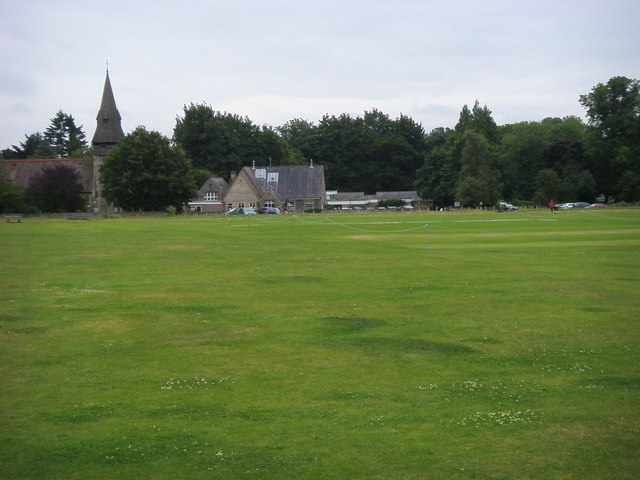
Chorleywood Common Cricket Ground

Habitats on the common are acid heathland, neutral grassland, chalk meadows and secondary woodland. There are also seven ponds which have rare plants and amphibians. Some 300 fungi, 70 plant species and 50 birds have been recorded.

There is access from Rickmansworth Road and Dog Kennel Lane.
