= The Withey Beds =

Nature reserve in Hertfordshire, England

Coordinates: 51.6345°N 0.4438°W

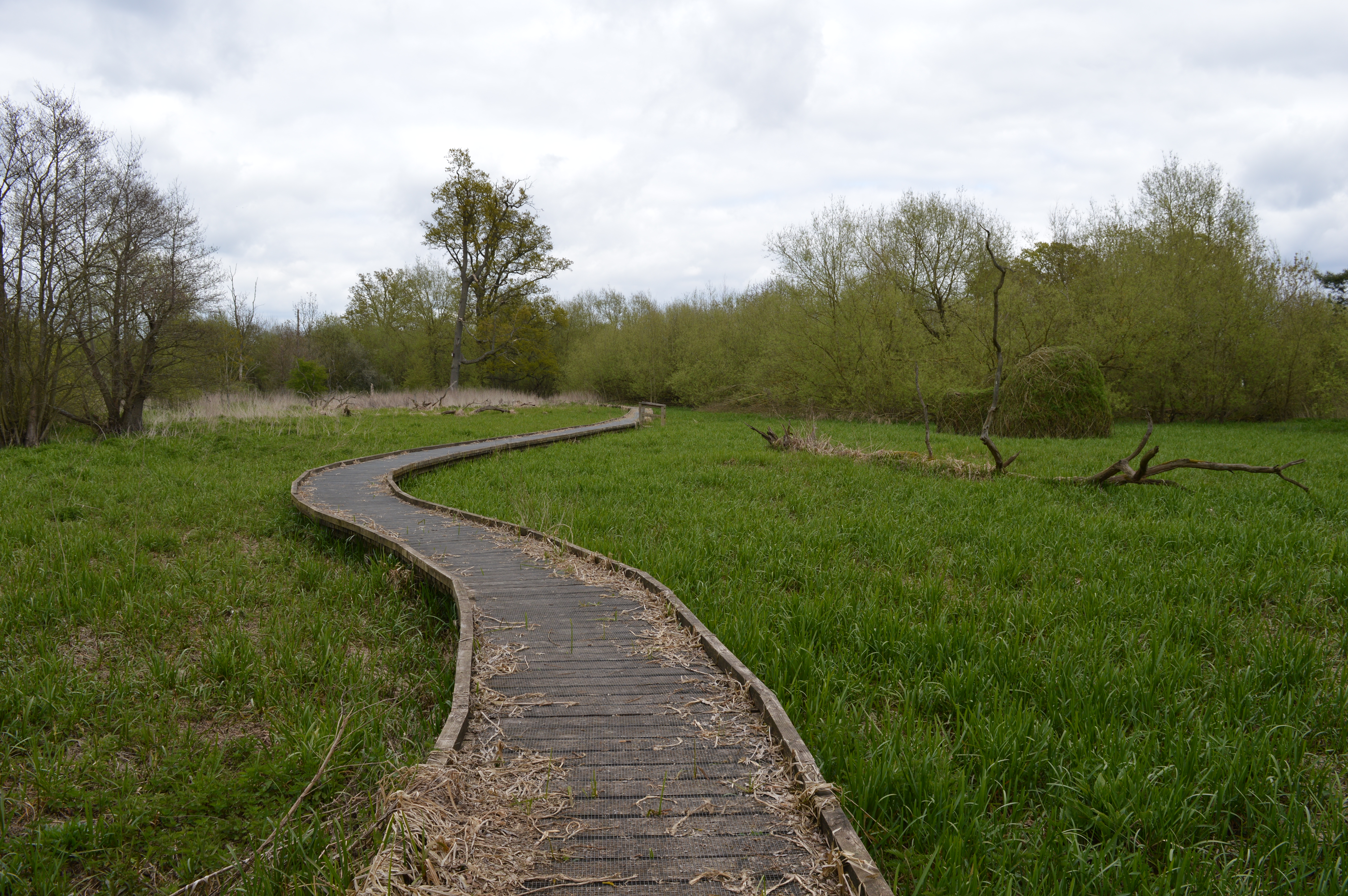

The Withey Beds is a 7.5 hectare Local Nature Reserve (LNR) in Rickmansworth in Hertfordshire. It was declared an LNR in 2004 by Three Rivers District Council, and the council owns and manages the site.

A withey (willow) bed is an area where willow is grown for coppicing. The site borders the River Colne, and it has a variety of habitats including dry grassland, wet woodland, marsh and ditches. A World War II pillbox has been turned into a bat roost. Rare invertebrates found on the site are the oak jewel beetle, soldier fly, and Roesel's bush cricket.

There is access from Moor Lane near the junction with Sandy Lodge Road.
