= Belsize, Hertfordshire =

Hamlet in Hertfordshire, England

Coordinates: 51.696763°N 0.503580°W

Belsize
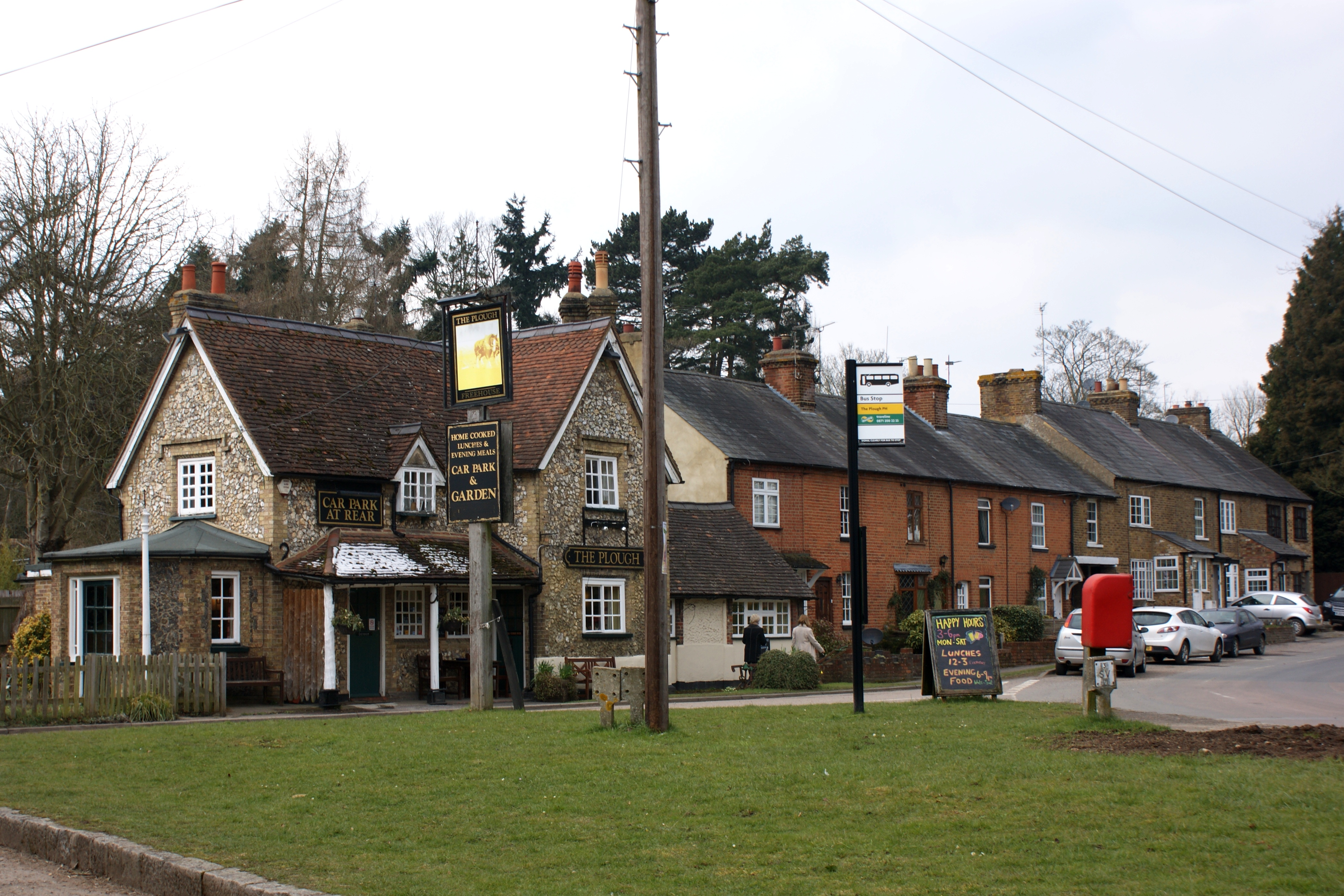
- The Plough and village green

- Location within Hertfordshire
- OS grid reference: TL0300
- Shire county: Hertfordshire
- Region: East
- Country: England
- Sovereign state: United Kingdom
- Post town: Kings Langley
- Postcode district: WD4
- Police: Hertfordshire
- Fire: Hertfordshire
- Ambulance: East of England

Belsize is a hamlet in Sarratt civil parish, Three Rivers District, Hertfordshire, England, situated less than a mile from Chipperfield and Sarratt.

Belsize was given the award of Hertfordshire's best-kept hamlet in both 1989 and 1996.
