= Astonbury Wood =

Nature reserve in Hertfordshire, England

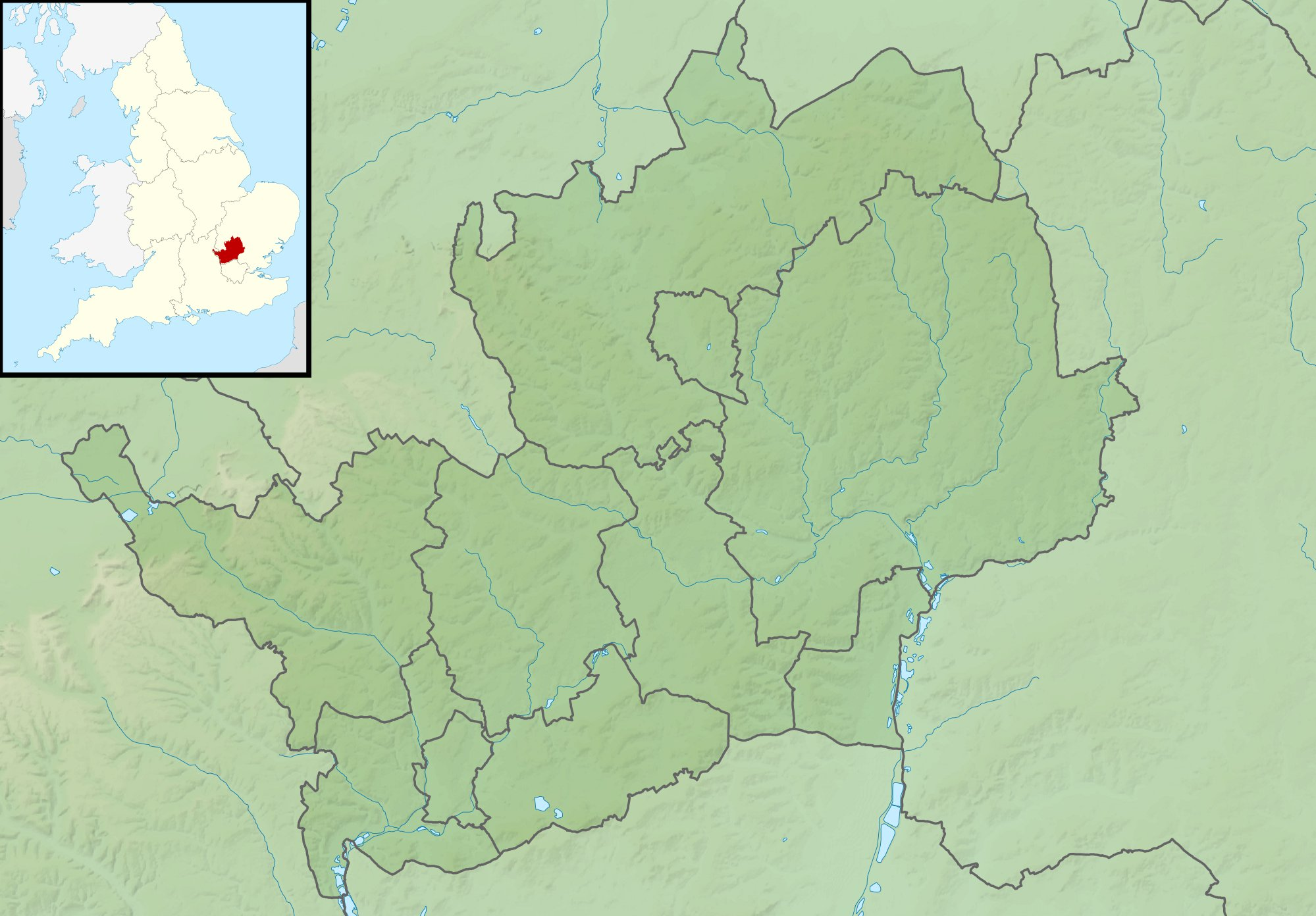
- Location within Hertfordshire
- Interactive map of Astonbury Wood
- Location: near Stevenage, Hertfordshire
- OS grid: TL 276 212
- Coordinates: 51°52′29″N 0°08′52″W
- Area: 54 hectares (130 acres)
- Operator: Herts and Middlesex Wildlife Trust
- Designation: Local Wildlife Site
- Website: www.hertswildlifetrust.org.uk/nature-reserves/astonbury-wood

Astonbury Wood is a nature reserve of Herts and Middlesex Wildlife Trust. It is an ancient woodland, near Stevenage in Hertfordshire, England.

== History and description ==
The 125-year lease of the wood, put up for sale by Hertfordshire County Council in 2020, was purchased after money was raised by Herts and Middlesex Wildlife Trust, and plans to protect the wood were begun in March 2023. Initial plans included a safety survey of trees and paths, ecological surveys, management planning to establish priorities, and planning signage and trails on the site.

The wood, area 54 hectares (130 acres), was in existence by 1600, so is classed as ancient woodland; such woods are much rarer than they once were. Because of the flora and fauna which has developed over this time, the site is designated a Local Wildlife Site. The trees are mostly oak and hornbeam, and spring flowers include bluebell, primrose, wood anemone and dog's mercury. The site is nationally recognised for fungi, of which many species have been identified.

The Ancient Astonbury and Wilder Woodlands Project, funded by a grant from the National Lottery Heritage Fund, was announced in April 2024, with the aim to restore and conserve Astonbury Wood and six other woods of the Trust: Balls Wood, Fir and Pond Woods, Gobions Wood, Old Park Wood, Long Deans and Hawkins Wood. Iain Ward, an officer of the project, said that it would "encourage the involvement of volunteers in their restoration and conservation.... A big part of it is to connect the community to Astonbury Wood, along with our other key woodland sites."
