= Kingsmead =

Kingsmead may refer to:

== Places in England ==
- Kingsmead, Bath, an electoral ward in Somerset
  - Kingsmead Square, Bath
- Kingsmead, Cheshire
- Kingsmead, a district of Shenley Brook End in Milton Keynes, Buckinghamshire

== Other uses ==
- Kingsmead College, a private girls' elementary and high school in Melrose, Johannesburg, South Africa
- Kingsmead Cricket Ground, Durban, South Africa
- Kingsmead Marsh, a nature reserve in Staffordshire, England
- Kingsmead School (disambiguation)
- Kingsmead Stadium, former venue in Canterbury, England
- Kingsmead Viaduct, A10 road, Ware, England
- King's Mead Priory, Derby, England

== See also ==
- King's Meads, nature reserve in Hertfordshire, England
