= Tollhouse Stream =

River in Hertfordshire, England

Coordinates: 51°45′55″N 0°00′56″E

The Tollhouse Stream is a watercourse in Hertfordshire, England. It rises in the Rye Meads a sewage treatment works on the northeastern bank of the River Lea close to Hoddesdon before flowing in a southeasterly direction. Treated effluent is discharged into the stream before merging with the River Stort shortly before its confluence with the River Lea.
