= Alpine meadow (disambiguation) =

Alpine meadow most often refers to:

- Alpine meadow or alpine tundra, a type of vegetated natural habitat at high altitude

Alpine meadow or alpine meadows may also refer to:

== Places ==
=== United Kingdom ===
- Alpine Meadow, Berkhamsted, a Site of Special Scientific Interest (SSSI) in Hertfordshire, England

=== United States ===
- Alpine Meadows, California, an unincorporated community in California
- Alpine Meadows Lodge, outside Golden, British Columbia
- Alpine Meadows Ranch, designed by Frank Lloyd Wright in Darby, Montana
- Alpine Meadows (ski resort) a ski resort in the Lake Tahoe Area of California

== Botany ==
- Thalictrum alpinum, a species of flowering plant sometimes known as the alpine meadow-rue

== See also ==
- Meadow
- Montane meadow
