= Parks and open spaces in the London Borough of Hillingdon =

The London Borough of Hillingdon is responsible for 239 parks and open spaces within its boundaries. Since much of the area is within the Green Belt, there are large areas of land properly called open space. They range in size from the Colne Valley corridor to the smallest gardens and playing fields.

- Barra Hall Park
- Bishop's Wood Country Park
- Cranford Park
- Denham Lock Wood
- Eastcote House Gardens
- Frays Farm Meadows
- Fassnidge Park
- Gutteridge Wood
- Hayes Park
- Hillingdon Court Park
- Ickenham Marsh
- Lake Farm Country Park
- Mid Colne Valley
- Minet Country Park
- Norman Leddy Memorial Gardens
- No Man's Land
- Old Park Wood
- Ruislip Woods (inc. Bayhurst Wood Country Park, Copse Wood, Mad Bess Wood)
- Pinkwell Park
- Stockley Country Park
- Hillingdon Parks Patrol Service
- Uxbridge Common
- Uxbridge Cricket Club Ground
