= Waterford Heath =

Local nature reserve in Hertfordshire, England

Coordinates: 51.8181°N 0.0892°W

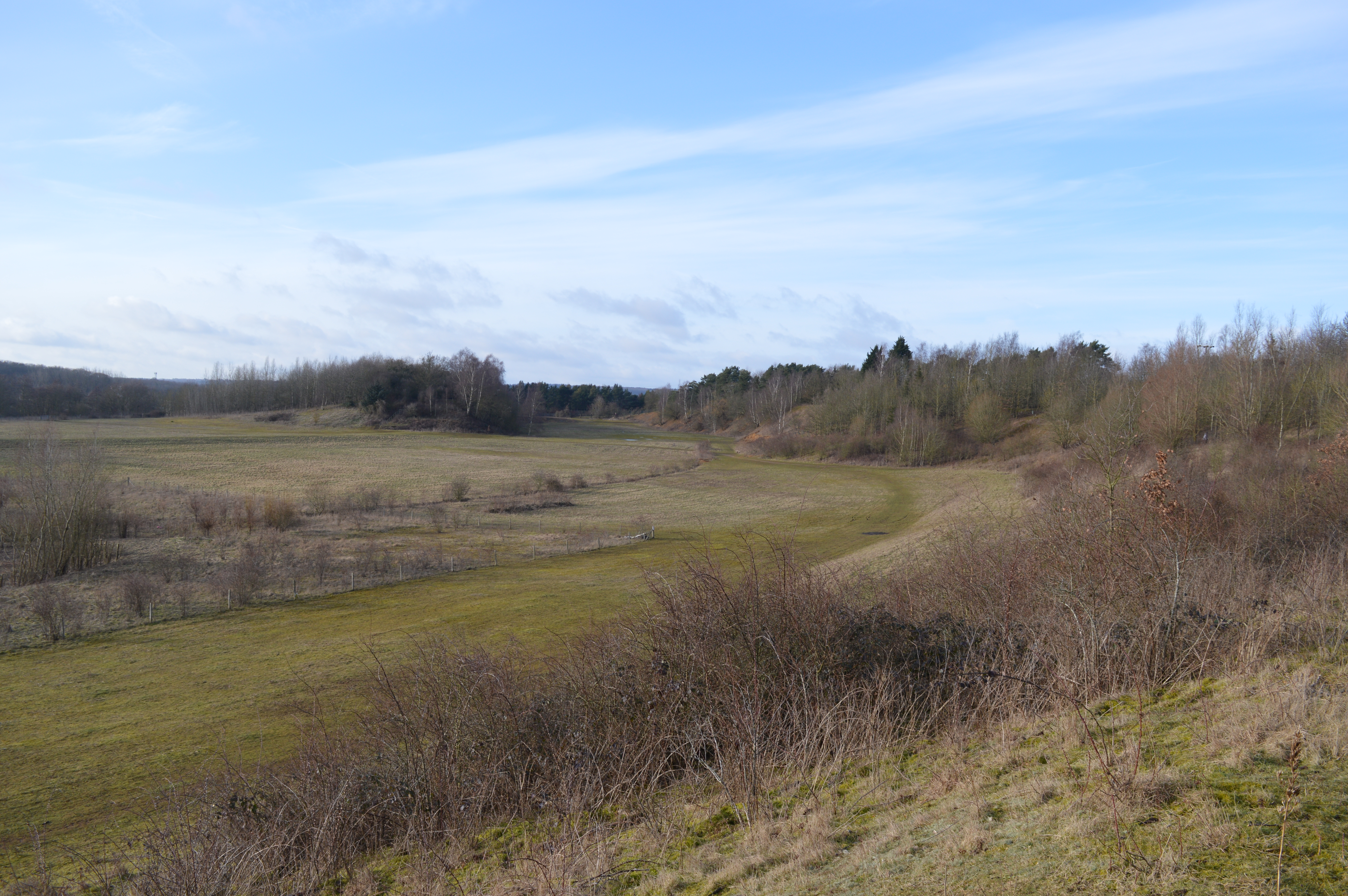
Waterford Heath south

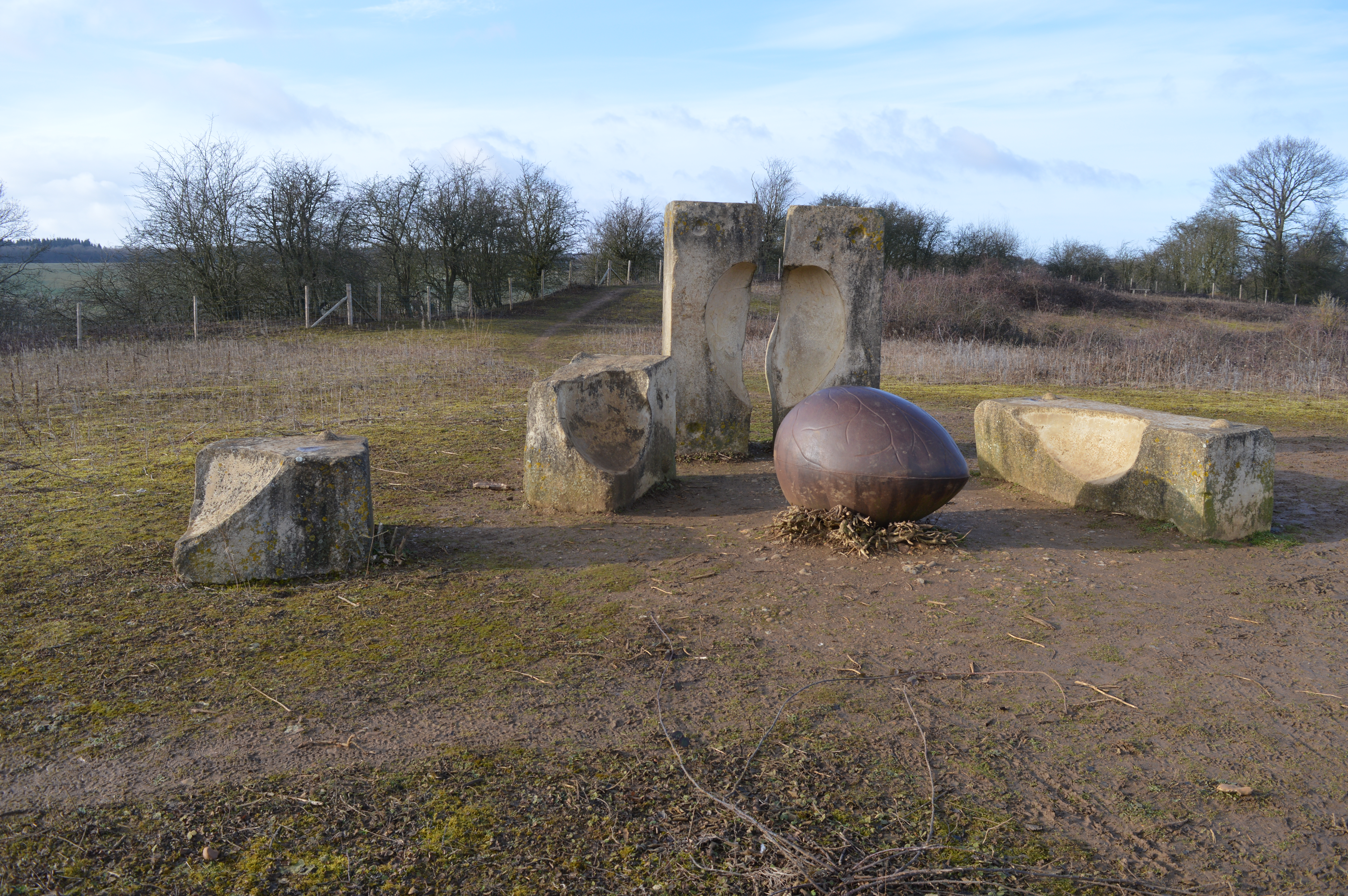
Changing Places, a sculpture on the north heath by Andrew McKeown

Waterford Heath is a 35.2 hectare Local Nature Reserve in Waterford in Hertfordshire, England. It is owned by Lafarge Tarmac and managed by the Herts and Middlesex Wildlife Trust together with East Hertfordshire District Council and Lafarge.

The site is in two areas, the north and south heaths, divided by Vicarage Road. It was sand and gravel quarry until the early 1990s, after which work was undertaken to convert it to a "community nature park". It is mainly grassland, with areas of scrub, wood plantation and semi-natural woodland. Breeding birds include skylarks and willow warblers, and there are reptiles such as slow worms and grass snakes. The north heath has a sculpture (pictured) created by Andrew McKeown in 2000.

The site is open at all times and it has a car park on Vicarage Road.
