= Hexton Chalk Pit =

Chalk quarry in Hertfordshire, England

Coordinates: 51.957017°N 0.389706°W

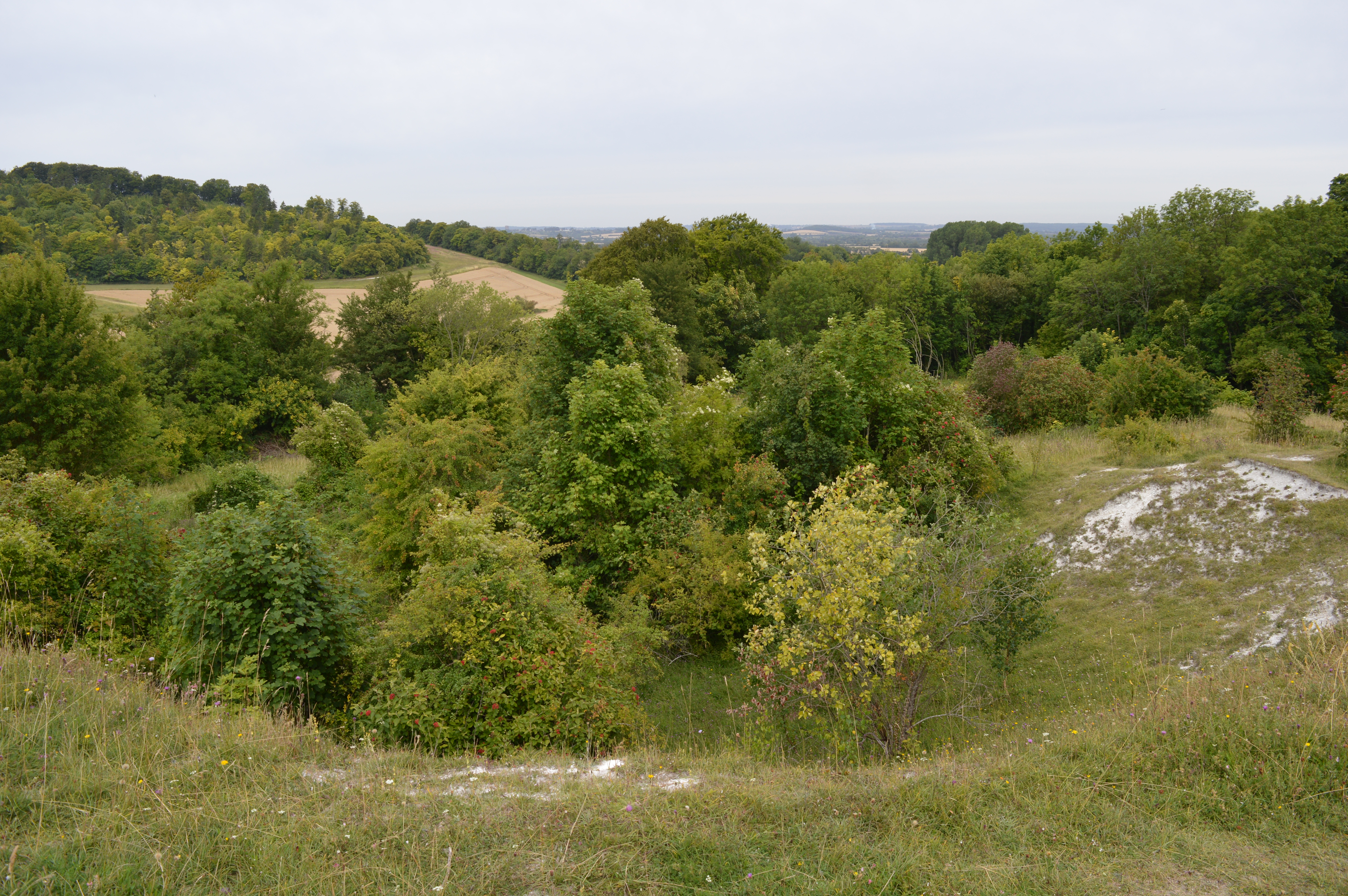

Hexton Chalk Pit is a 1.9-hectare (4.7-acre) nature reserve in Hexton in North Hertfordshire, managed by the Herts and Middlesex Wildlife Trust. It is grassland with steep slopes and many chalk-loving plants such as horseshoe vetch, yellow-wort, milkwort and rockrose. There are five species of orchid and a large colony of chalkhill blue butterflies. The site has extensive views over the countryside.

The reserve is on the left of the road signposted "Lilley" from Hexton. There is also access by a footpath, signposted "circular walk", from Barton Hill Road, close to the Icknield Way Path.
