= Ridlins Mire =

Nature reserve in Hertfordshire, England

Coordinates: 51.884501°N 0.165626°W

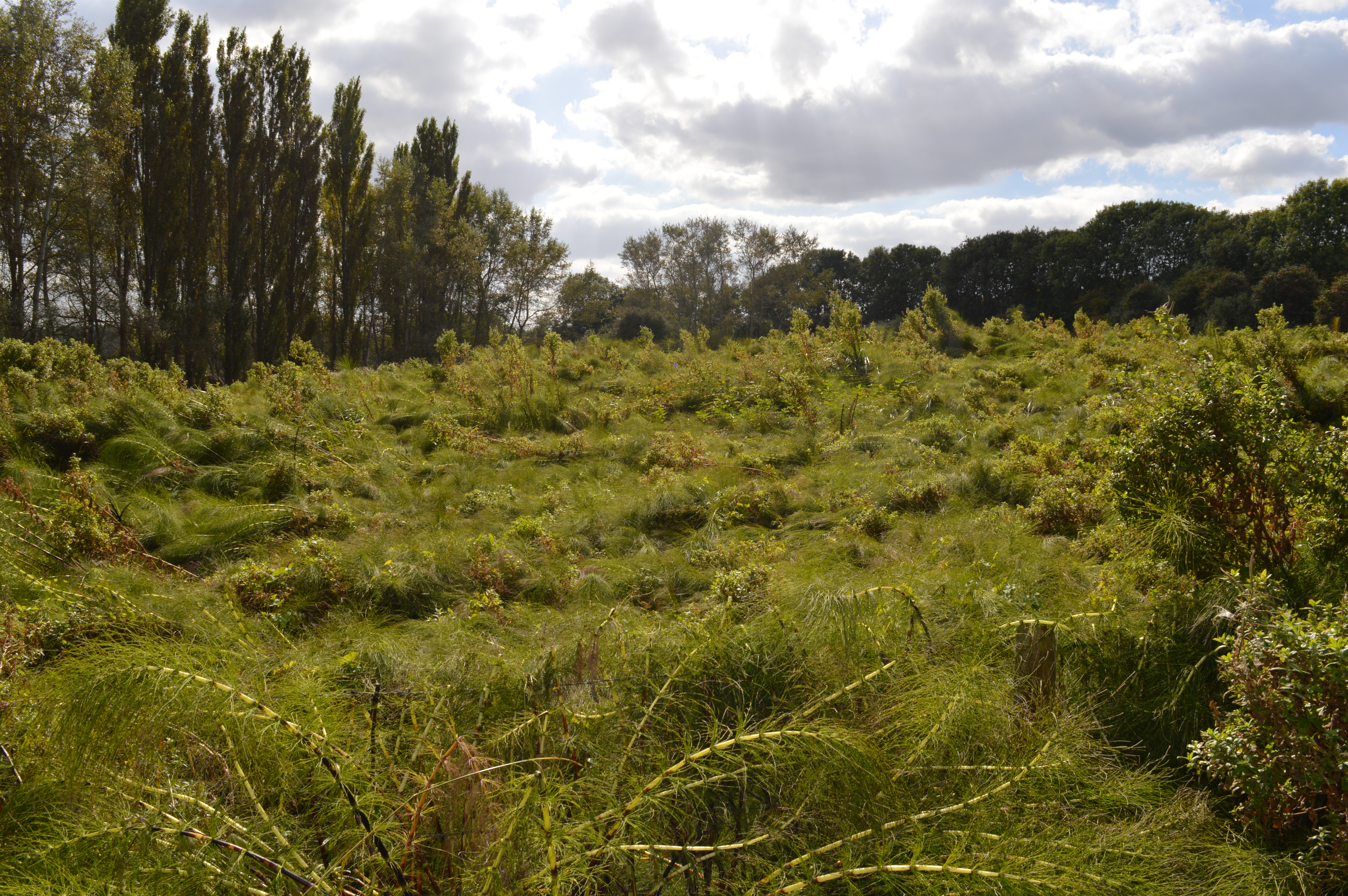

Ridlins Mire is a 1.6-hectare (4.0-acre) nature reserve managed by the Herts and Middlesex Wildlife Trust in Stevenage, Hertfordshire, England.

This wetland site is a type of peat bog. It is the result of a spring, which has resulted in the growth of peat over many years into a domed structure called a rheotrophic hangmire. This is a rare habitat and unique in Hertfordshire. The dominant plants are tussock sedge and marsh marigold. There are birds such as long-tailed tits and great tits, and butterflies including large whites and small tortoiseshells.

The site is unfenced on its border with Goddard End, but access is difficult as there is no formal entrance or footpaths.
