= Herts and Middlesex Wildlife Trust =

Nature reserve trust in south-east England

- Hertfordshire and Middlesex Wildlife Trust Limited

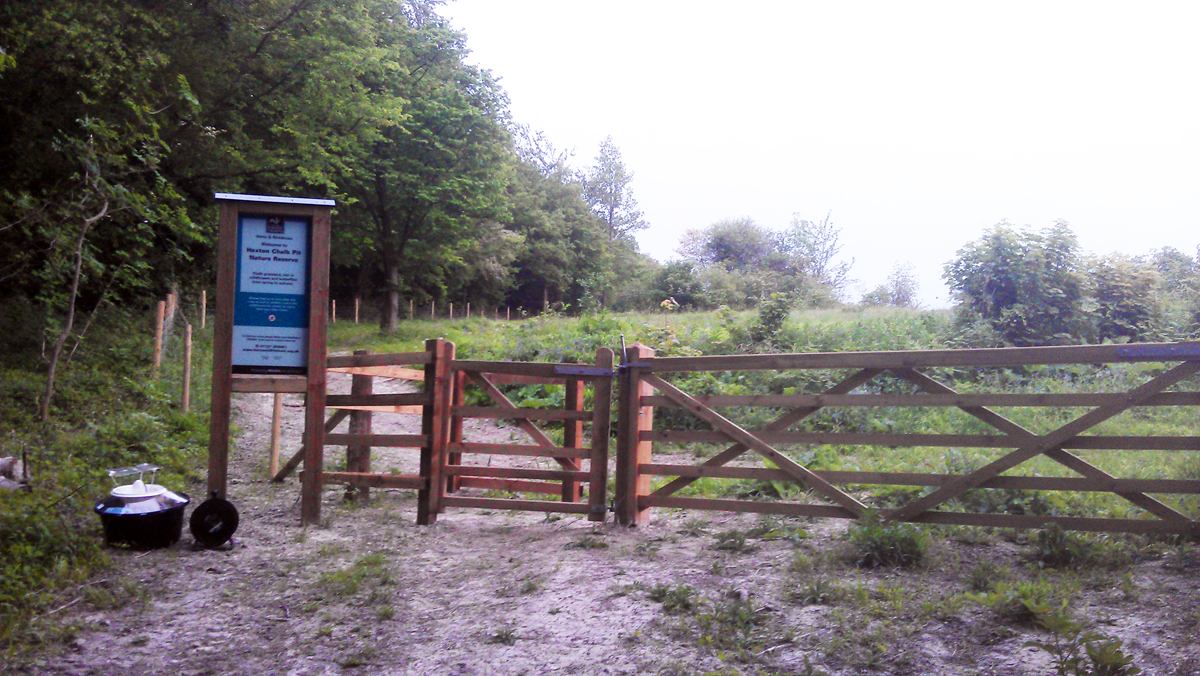
- The entrance to Hexton Chalk Pit, near Hitchin
- Formation: October 9, 1964; 62 years ago
- Type: Conservation charity
- Registration no.: Registered charity 239863
- Headquarters: St Albans, Hertfordshire
- Region served: Hertfordshire, parts of North London
- Chief Executive: Laura Burrows
- Main organ: Local Wildlife Sites Newsletter
- Parent organization: The Wildlife Trusts
- Website: www.hertswildlifetrust.org.uk
- Formerly called: Hertfordshire & Middlesex Trust for Nature Conservation

Herts and Middlesex Wildlife Trust manages over 40 nature reserves covering nearly 810 hectares (2,000 acres) north of London, in Hertfordshire and the historic county of Middlesex, part of which is divided between the London boroughs of Barnet, Enfield, Harrow and Hillingdon. It has 23,000 members, and is one of 46 Wildlife Trusts across the UK. It is a Registered Charity, with its Registered Office in St Albans.

The trust's activities include managing nature reserves, advising landowners on how to manage their land for wildlife, commenting on planning applications, advising planning authorities and campaigning to protect wildlife. The trust also encourages people to be active volunteers helping to maintain nature reserves.

The first preparatory meeting of what was to become the trust was held on 16 November 1963, and the Hertfordshire & Middlesex Trust for Nature Conservation was incorporated on 9 October 1964. By 1970 it had twenty reserves and in the same year it took over management of its first Site of Special Scientific Interest (SSSI), Blagrove Common. In 1987 it changed its name to the Herts and Middlesex Wildlife Trust. (Note: The charity's legal name is the Hertfordshire and Middlesex Wildlife Trust Limited, but its trading name is the Herts and Middlesex Wildlife Trust.) In 2007 it purchased Amwell Quarry, and started restoration which has now made the site internationally important for its wetland birds.

Two of the trust's nature reserves are Ramsar sites, internationally important wetland reserves; fifteen are SSSIs, and five are Local Nature Reserves. The first site was Fox Covert, donated by Mr Fordham of Letchworth on the trust's foundation in 1964. The largest is King's Meads, at 96 hectares (240 acres); this is water meadows where 265 wildflower species have been recorded, and it is an important site for overwintering European stonechats. The smallest is Alpine Meadow at 0.8 hectares, which has been designated an SSSI as an example of unimproved chalk grassland.

== Nature reserves ==
=== Key ===
Designations

- LNR = Local Nature Reserve
- Ramsar = Internationally important wetland site
- RIGS = Regionally Important Geological Site
- SPA = Special Protection Area
- SSSI = Site of Special Scientific Interest

Access

- YES = Free public access to all or most of the site
- NO = No public access
- PO = Access with permit only
- NF = No footpaths
- VO = Viewing only
- WTO = Wildlife Trust members only

Site	Photograph	Area (Note: The area, location and public access are taken from the Herts and Middlesex Wildlife Trust page for each site.)	Location	Public access	Designations	Description
Aldbury Nowers	Aldbury Nowers	19.7 ha (49 acres)	Tring; 51.8125°N 0.6197°W; SP 952 135	YES	SSSI	According to Natural England this site "contains one of the best remaining areas of chalk downland in the county as well as one of the finest examples of ancient 'beech hanger' woodland".
Alpine Meadow	Alpine Meadow	0.8 ha (2.0 acres)	Berkhamsted; 51.7831°N 0.5670°W; SP 989 103	YES	SSSI	This is a steeply sloping area of meadow and woodland, and it has been designated an SSSI as a rare example of unimproved chalk grassland. Butterflies include marbled white and the rare Duke of Burgundy.
Amwell Quarry	Amwell Quarry	40.1 ha (99 acres)	Great Amwell; 51.7965°N 0.0053°W; TL 376 127	YES	SSSI Ramsar SPA	This former gravel pit is of international importance for wintering wildfowl. It also has many species of breeding birds, damselflies and dragonflies, including the hairy dragonfly, red-eyed damselfly and southern hawker.
Ashwell Quarry and Quarry Springs	Ashwell Quarry and Quarry Springs	3.0 ha (7.4 acres)	Ashwell; 52.0402°N 0.1738°W; TL 253 395	PO	RIGS	Plants in the quarry include pyramidal orchid, clustered bellflower and glaucous sedge, and there are rare mosses in shaded hollows. Quarry Springs has rare wildlife such as flatworms which need water which is clean and at a constant temperature around 10 °C.
Astonbury Wood	—	54 ha (130 acres)	Stevenage; 51°52′29″N 0°08′52″W; TL 276 212	YES		The site is ancient woodland.
Balls Wood	Balls Wood	58.5 ha (145 acres)	Hertford Heath; 51.778°N 0.047°W; TL 348 106	YES		The site has areas of hornbeam coppice and mixed woodland with wide grassy paths, which have many butterflies in the spring. Great spotted woodpeckers and sparrowhawks breed on the site.
Blagrove Common	Blagrove Common	3.9 ha (9.6 acres)	Sandon; 51.9863°N 0.0668°W; TL 328 337	YES	SSSI	This is marshy grassland on poorly draining clay, which is now a scarce habitat in the county. The rich flora include several species of orchids, cuckoo flowers, and marsh marigolds.
Broadwater Lake	Korda Lake	19.4 ha (48 acres)	Harefield; 51.5852°N 0.4924°W; TQ 045 884	YES	SSSI	The reserve includes Korda Lake, Long Pond, the River Colne and the western side of Broadwater Lake. It is part of the Mid Colne Valley SSSI, which has nationally important bird colonies including great crested grebes, cormorants and gadwalls.
Cassiobury Park	Cassiobury Park	24.6 ha (61 acres)	Watford; 51.6635°N 0.4262°W; TQ 089 972	YES	LNR	The nature reserve is a corner of the park. It has marshland and open pools, together with areas of wet woodland and pasture. These provide breeding sites and food for many bird species.
Danemead	Danemead	5.6 ha (14 acres)	Hoddesdon; 51.7523°N 0.0507°W; TL 346 077	YES	SSSI	This is part of the Wormley-Hoddesdonpark Wood North SSSI. It has areas of wet grassland, scrub and hornbeam woodland, together with a stream. Wild flowers include meadowsweet and devil's-bit scabious.
Fir and Pond Woods	alt-Fir Wood	29.0 ha (72 acres)	Potters Bar; 51.6955°N 0.1530°W; TL 277 012	YES		Fir Wood to the south is connected by a short footpath to the large Pond Wood to the north. The woods are a remnant of the ancient Enfield Chase, and they have woodland, meadows and wetlands, and diverse bird life. Turkey Brook passes a meadow at the southern end of Pond Wood.
Fox Covert	Fox Covert	2.9 ha (7.2 acres)	Royston; 52.0401°N 0.0557°W; TL 334 397	YES		The site is mature beech woodland, planted in the nineteenth century, and ground flora includes many white helleborine orchids. It has deer and many species of birds.
Frogmore Meadow	Frogmore Meadows and River Chess	3.3 ha (8.2 acres)	Chenies; 51.6791°N 0.5225°W; TQ 022 988	YES	SSSI	This SSSI has marshy areas and fens next to the River Chess, damp grassland and drier, more acidic areas. The river bank has water voles, and damp areas are dominated by meadow foxtail and Yorkshire fog.
Gobions Wood	Gobions Wood	36.0 ha (89 acres)	Brookmans Park; 51.7213°N 0.1925°W; TL 249 040	YES		The site is mainly woodland, but additional habitats are grassland, hedges and ponds. 558 species of fungi have been found, two of which have not been recorded previously in Britain, and over 100 which are scarce in Hertfordshire. Birds include blackcaps, chiffchaffs and nuthatches.
Hawkins Wood	Hawkins Wood	10.0 ha (25 acres)	Therfield; 51.9978°N 0.0517°W; TL 338 350	YES		The wood is thought to be named after a John Hawkins who is mentioned in documents dated 1676. It is divided by medieval banks and ditches into north, south and central sections. It has woods, fields and hedges, and birds include bullfinch, linnet and yellowhammer. There are also brown hares and deer.
Hertford Heath	Hertford Heath	28.3 ha (70 acres)	Hertford Heath; 51.7800°N 0.0423°W; TL 351 108	YES	SSSI	This site is an example of heathland, a threatened habitat in southern England. It is dominated by heather, and there are grass snakes and slowworms. Sphagnum mosses and creeping willow are found in wetter areas.
Hexton Chalk Pit	Hexton Chalk Pit	1.9 ha (4.7 acres)	Hexton; 51.9570°N 0.3897°W; TL 107 299	YES		This former chalk quarry is grassland with steep slopes and many chalk-loving plants such as horseshoe vetch, yellow-wort and milkwort. There are five species of orchid and a large colony of chalkhill blue butterflies. The site has extensive views over the countryside.
Hilfield Park Reservoir	Hilfield Park Reservoir	76.3 ha (189 acres)	Bushey; 51.651°N 0.336°W; TQ 152 959	WTO	LNR	This large reservoir is of national importance for pochards, tufted ducks and common tern. The margins have marshy areas with many breeding birds and marsh plants, such as reedmace and reed canarygrass.
Hunsdon and Eastwick Meads	Hunsdon Mead	28.0 ha (69 acres)	Harlow; 51.7758°N 0.0488°E; TL 414 105	YES	SSSI	This SSSI is unimproved grassland which is subject to flooding in winter. It is one of the last areas in the region to be managed by the old Lammas method of hay-making followed by winter grazing.
King's Meads	New River in King's Meads	96.0 ha (237 acres)	Ware; 51.805°N 0.044°W; TL 349 136	YES		The site is water meadows which are subject to flooding in winter. It has large populations of water birds, and is an important site for overwintering stonechats. 119 bird species and 265 wildflower species have been recorded.
Lemsford Springs	Lemsford Springs	4.0 ha (9.9 acres)	Lemsford; 51.7964°N 0.2287°W; TL 222 123	PO		The sites has lagoons which are fed by springs, so they never freeze over and provide an important habitat for birds in cold winters. There are two bird hides, and birds which can be seen include water rails, snipe and green sandpipers. There are also water shrews and around fifty species of freshwater snails.
Long Deans	Long Deans	15.0 ha (37 acres)	Nash Mills; 51.7312°N 0.4441°W; TL 075 047	YES		This reserve is neutral and chalk grassland and woodland, with beech, ash, oak and wild cherry. The grassland has wild flowers, birds and butterflies. Ancient trees have fungi, birds and bats. Birds include common linnet, common bullfinch and song thrush.
Longspring Wood	Longspring Wood	1.2 ha (3.0 acres)	Kings Langley; 51.7201°N 0.4213°W; TL 091 035	YES		The main trees in this small wood are oak, ash, wild cherry and hazel, and there is a display of bluebells in the spring. Birds include warblers, finches and tits, and there are mammals such as foxes and badgers.
Old Park Wood	Old Park Wood	7.7 ha (19 acres)	Harefield; 51.6112°N 0.4857°W; TQ 049 913	YES	SSSI	This SSSI is described by Natural England as "one of the most floristically rich ancient woods in Greater London". It is on a steep slope, cut by small valleys, and supports a variety of breeding birds.
Oughtonhead	Oughtonhead Nature Reserve	6.2 ha (15 acres)	Hitchin; 51.9602°N 0.2994°W; TL 169 304	NO		Habitats include wet and dry woodland, the bank of the River Oughton, and fen areas. Willow, reed and rush were formerly grown and harvested in the wetter areas, and there was a corn mill at the eastern end. Birds include kingfishers and water rails, and there are mammals such as water shrews.
Patmore Heath	Patmore Heath	8.4 ha (21 acres)	Albury; 51.9116°N 0.0943°E; TL 441 257	YES	SSSI	Most of this SSSI is dry heathland but, in some areas variations in the underlying clay result in pools and marshy areas, which have a varied wetland flora. The heath is also noted for insects such as the emperor dragonfly.
Purwell Ninesprings	Purwell Ninesprings	6.4 ha (16 acres)	Hitchin; 51.9496°N 0.2459°W; TL 206 293	YES		There is open water with water voles and birds such as common moorhens, mallards and teals. Other birds include snipe and siskins. The wet ground has plants such as tussock sedge, yellow iris and water forget-me-nots.
Ridlins Mire	Ridlins Mire	1.6 ha (4.0 acres)	Stevenage; 51.8845°N 0.1656°W; TL 263 222	NF		This wetland site is the result of a spring, which has resulted in the growth of peat over many years into a rare domed structure called a rheotrophic hangmire. The dominant plants are tussock sedge and marsh marigold. There are birds such as long-tailed tits and great tits, and butterflies including large whites and small tortoiseshells.
Rye Meads	Rye Meads	32.0 ha (79 acres)	Rye House; 51.7746°N 0.0126°E; TL 389 103	YES	SSSI Ramsar SPA	This is an ancient flood meadow which has a variety of habitats including reedbed, marshy grassland and fen. It is grazed by ponies and water buffalo. Birds include water rails, bitterns and teals, and there are invertebrates such as frogs, toads and grass snakes.
Stanborough Reedmarsh	Stanborough Reedmarsh	3.3 ha (8.2 acres)	Welwyn Garden City; 51.7801°N 0.2177°W; TL 230 105	YES	LNR	The site is wet willow woodland on the bank of the River Lea. It is important for water voles and birds such as reed and sedge warblers. Water figwort, common meadow rue and water chickweed grow along the river bank.
Stocker's Lake	Stocker's Lake	40.4 ha (100 acres)	Rickmansworth; 51.6346°N 0.4850°W; TQ 049 939	YES	LNR	This large lake is nationally important for its wintering birds, including goldeneye and smew. It has the largest heronry in Hertfordshire and over sixty bird species have been recorded.
Stocking Springs Wood	Stocking Springs Wood	1.1 ha (2.7 acres)	Ayot St Lawrence; 51.8256°N 0.2551°W; TL 203 155	YES		The site is hornbeam woodland, and older trees are gnarled in shape as a result of past coppicing. In spring there are bluebells and wild daffodils, and plants such as wood anemone are indicators that the woodland is ancient.
Tewin Orchard and Hopkyns Wood	Entrance to Tewin Orchard	4.3 ha (11 acres)	Tewin; 51.8242°N 0.1608°W; TL 268 155	YES		Tewin Orchard is an eighty-year old fruit orchard which has a number of Hertfordshire apple varieties, including the Hitchin Pippin, which was propagated from the last known tree. The orchard attracts many birds, such as fieldfares and redwings. Hopkyns Wood is dominated by oaks and hornbeams, with ground flora of bluebells and ramsons. It also has a mature badger sett.
Tewinbury	Tewinbury	3.6 ha (8.9 acres)	Tewin; 51.8242°N 0.1608°W; TL 265 140	VO	SSSI	This SSSI has alluvial meadows and marshes which are rare in lowland Britain. There are areas of swamp and tall fens, with plants including butterbur and angelica. Otters have been observed on the riverbank.
Thorley Wash	Thorley Wash	13.0 ha (32 acres)	Thorley; 51.8421°N 0.1607°E; TL 489 181	YES	SSSI	This site was formerly a flood pound for the Stort Navigation. Habitats include tall wash grassland, which is now rare, marsh and waterlogged grassland. The varied plant species include reed sweet-grass and meadowsweet.
Tring Reservoirs	Startops Reservoir	55.0 ha (136 acres)	Tring; 51.812°N 0.689°W; SP 904 134	YES	SSSI	The reservoirs are located on the chalk of the Chilterns, and they have clear eutrophic waters with diverse animals and plants. They are an important habitat for birds and invertebrates, including diverse dragonfly species.
Uxbridge Alderglade	Uxbridge Alderglade	2.9 ha (7.2 acres)	Uxbridge; 51.5571°N 0.4760°W; TQ 057 853	YES		This former railway embankment is wet woodland of crack willow and alder, with areas of marsh. Plants include birds-foot trefoil and small toadflax, and mammals the rare Brandt's bat, as well as stoats, weasels and moles.
Waterford Heath	Waterford Heath	35.2 ha (87 acres)	Waterford; 51.8185°N 0.0885°W; TL 318 150	YES	LNR	This is a former quarry, which has grassland, scrub and woodland. Breeding birds include skylarks and willow warblers, and there are reptiles such as slowworms, common lizards and grass snakes.
Willowmead	River Mimram in Willowmead	1.5 ha (3.7 acres)	Hertford; 51.7926°N 0.0954°W; TL 314 121	YES		The site is on the bank of the River Mimram, and it is wet woodland, mainly of alder trees which are often mature. Water voles and otters have been seen in the river. Water birds include kingfishers, mallards and mandarin ducks. There are breeding birds in the woodland, such as lesser spotted woodpeckers and spotted flycatcher.

== Sites formerly managed by the trust ==
- Barkway Chalk Pit
- Broad Colney Lakes
- Darland's Lake Nature Reserve
- Hill End Pit
- Marshalls Heath
- Pryor's Wood
- Rowley Green Common
- Sawbridgeworth Marsh
- Telegraph Hill

== See also ==
- List of Local Nature Reserves in Hertfordshire
- List of Sites of Special Scientific Interest in Hertfordshire
