= Ashwell Quarry and Quarry Springs =

Nature reserve in Hertfordshire, England

Coordinates: 52.040188°N 0.17384°W

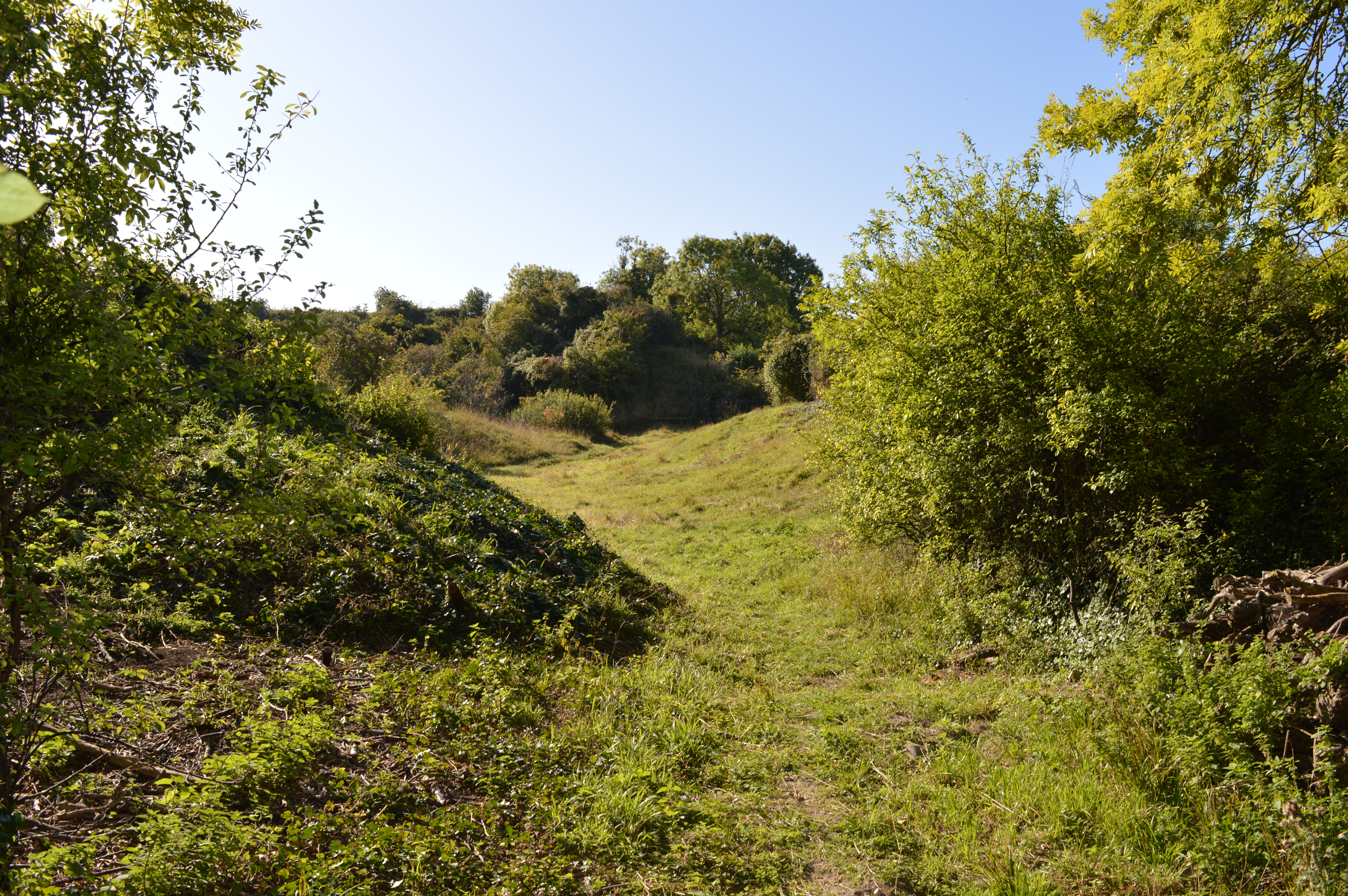
Ashwell Quarry

Ashwell Quarry and Quarry Springs is a three hectare nature reserve managed by the Herts and Middlesex Wildlife Trust near Ashwell in Hertfordshire. Ashwell Quarry is owned by a local farmer, and Quarry Springs by Hertfordshire County Council. It is a Regionally Important Geological Site.

The quarry may date to Roman times and its Totternhoe stone was probably used to build Ashwell's fourteenth-century church. In the nineteenth century it was grazed by sheep, adding the nutrients required for wild flowers which need soils which are dry and chalky. In 1970 it became a nature reserve. Plants include pyramidal orchid, clustered bellflower and glaucous sedge, and there are rare mosses in shaded hollows. Quarry Springs has rare wildlife such as flatworms which need water which is clean and at a constant temperature around 10 degrees Celsius.

A permit is required from the local warden of the Wildlife Trust for entry to Ashwell Quarry, which is a mile west of Ashwell, on the Hinxworth Road opposite Loves Lane. Quarry Springs is on the opposite side of the road to the quarry.
