= Tewinbury =

Protected area in Hertfordshire, England

Coordinates: 51.8095°N 0.1679°W

- Site of Special Scientific Interest
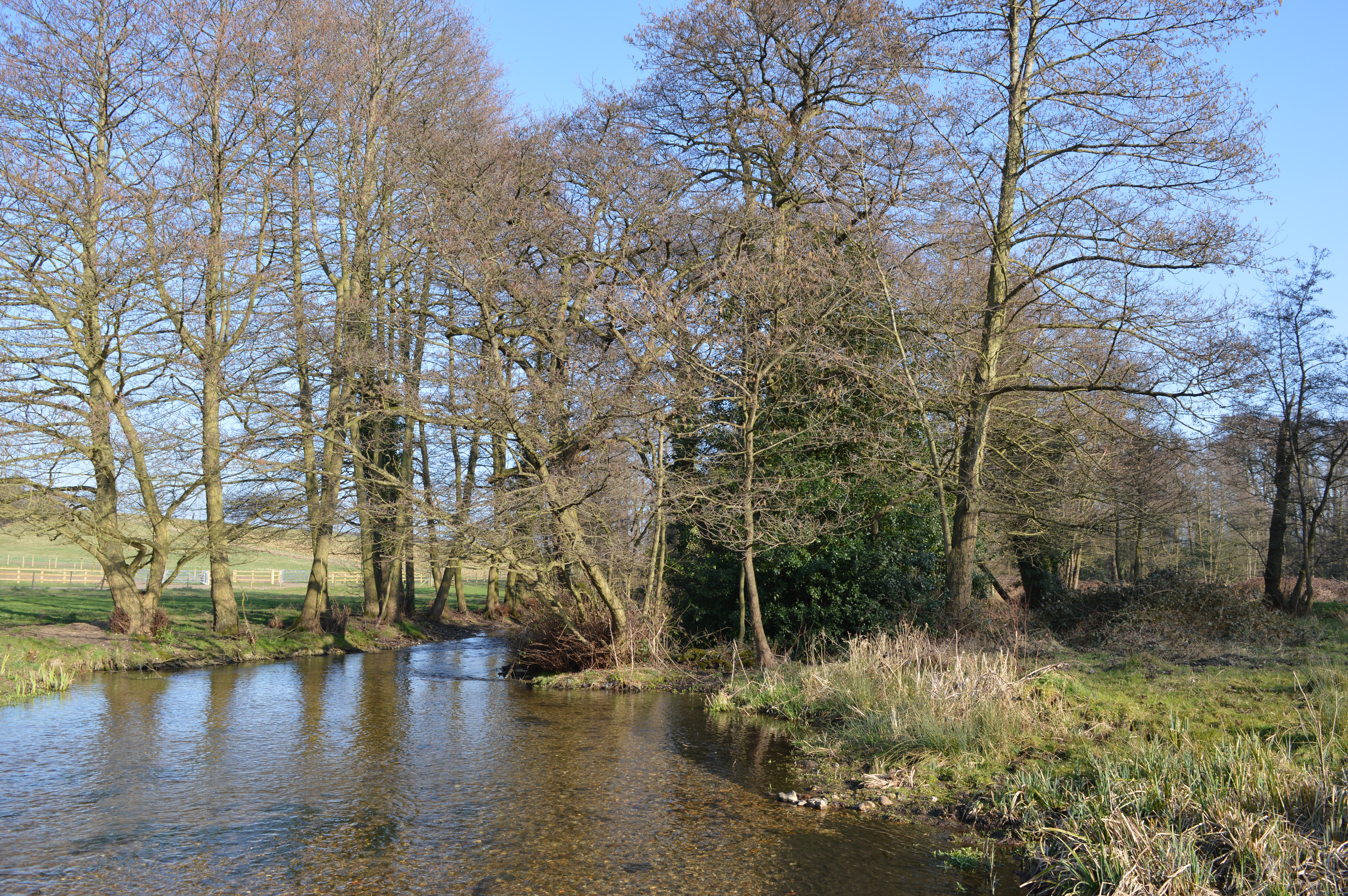
- River Mimram with Orchard Meadow on the right
- Location of Tewinbury.
- Area of search: Hertfordshire
- Grid reference: TL264139
- Interest: Biological
- Area: 7.5 ha (19 acres)
- Notification date: 1984
- Location map: Magic Map

Tewinbury is a 7.5-hectare (19-acre) biological Site of Special Scientific Interest near Tewin in Hertfordshire. The local planning authority is East Hertfordshire District Council, and the site is managed by the Herts and Middlesex Wildlife Trust

The site borders the River Mimram. It has alluvial meadows and marshes which are rare in lowland Britain. There are areas of swamp and tall fens, with plants including butterbur and angelica. Otters have been observed on the riverbank, in possibly the only site in the county. There is also an area of ash and willow woodland. There is a lagoon which has a two storey hide for observing birds and water voles.

Access to the site is in the drive to the Tewin Bury Farm Hotel on Hertford Road. There is a car park, which also serves the hotel, but no public access apart from the hide and a small area called Orchard Meadow behind the car park.
