= Amwell Quarry =

Nature reserve in Hertfordshire, England

Coordinates: 51.79647°N 0.00532°W

- Site of Special Scientific Interest
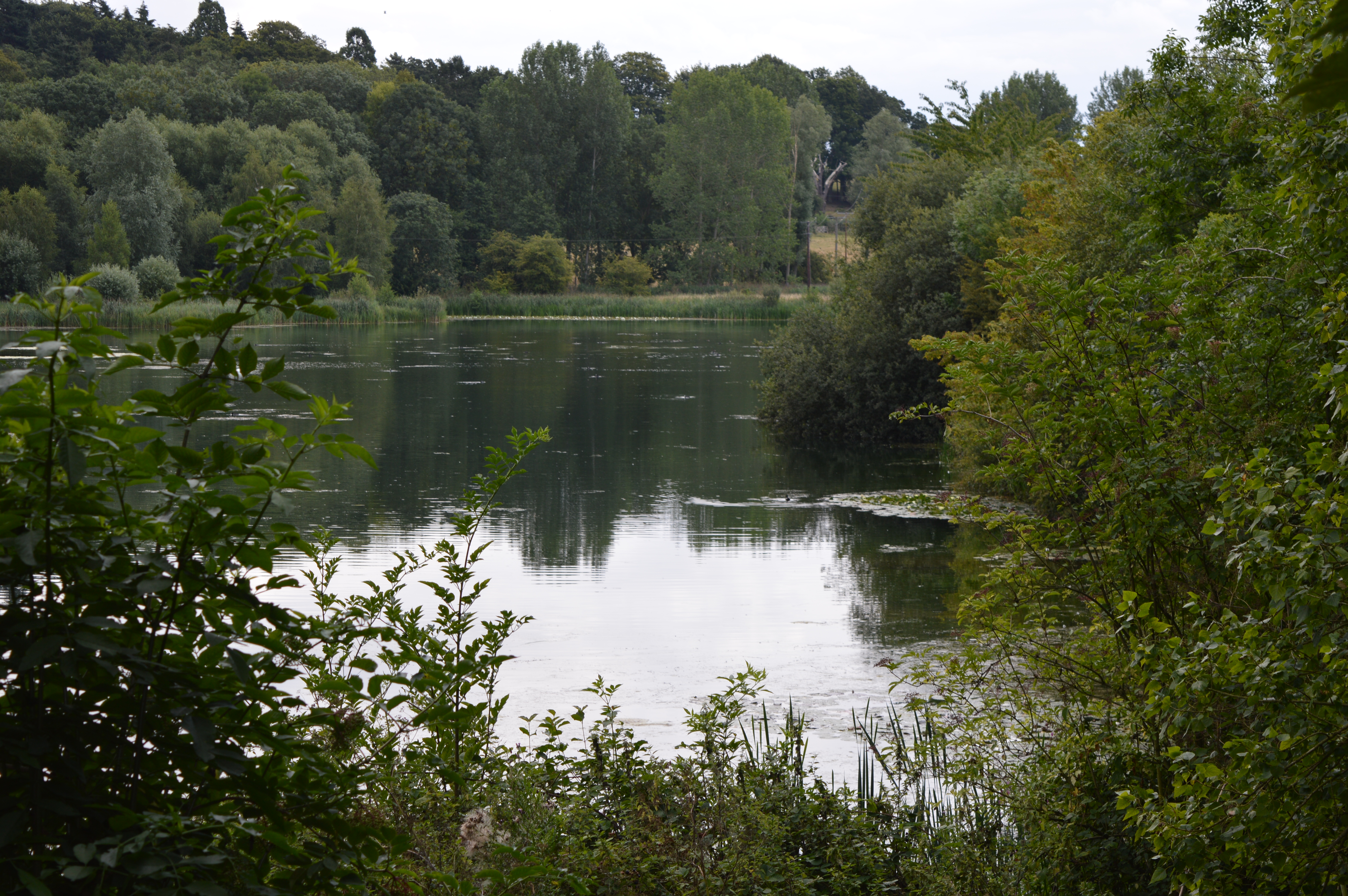
- Location of Amwell Quarry.
- Area of search: Hertfordshire
- Grid reference: TL377129
- Interest: Biological
- Area: 37.0 ha (91 acres)
- Notification date: 1999
- Location map: Magic Map

Amwell Quarry or Amwell Nature Reserve is a 37 hectare biological Site of Special Scientific Interest in Great Amwell in Hertfordshire. The planning authority is East Hertfordshire District Council. It is also part of the Lee Valley Ramsar Site and Special Protection Area, and is owned and managed by the Hertfordshire and Middlesex Wildlife Trust.

The site is a former gravel pit, which has been restored to become a wetland nature reserve with two lakes, Great Hardmead Lake and Hollycross Lake. It is internationally important for wintering wildfowl, and is Britain's most important site for dragonflies. It also has large communities of damselflies and breeding birds. Plants include marsh dock and hairlike pondweed, both nationally rare. Amwell has a quarter of all British species of molluscs.

There is access from Amwell Lane and the site is open at all times.

== See also ==
- List of Sites of Special Scientific Interest in Hertfordshire
