= Stocking Springs Wood =

Nature reserve in Hertfordshire, England

Coordinates: 51.8243°N 0.25382°W

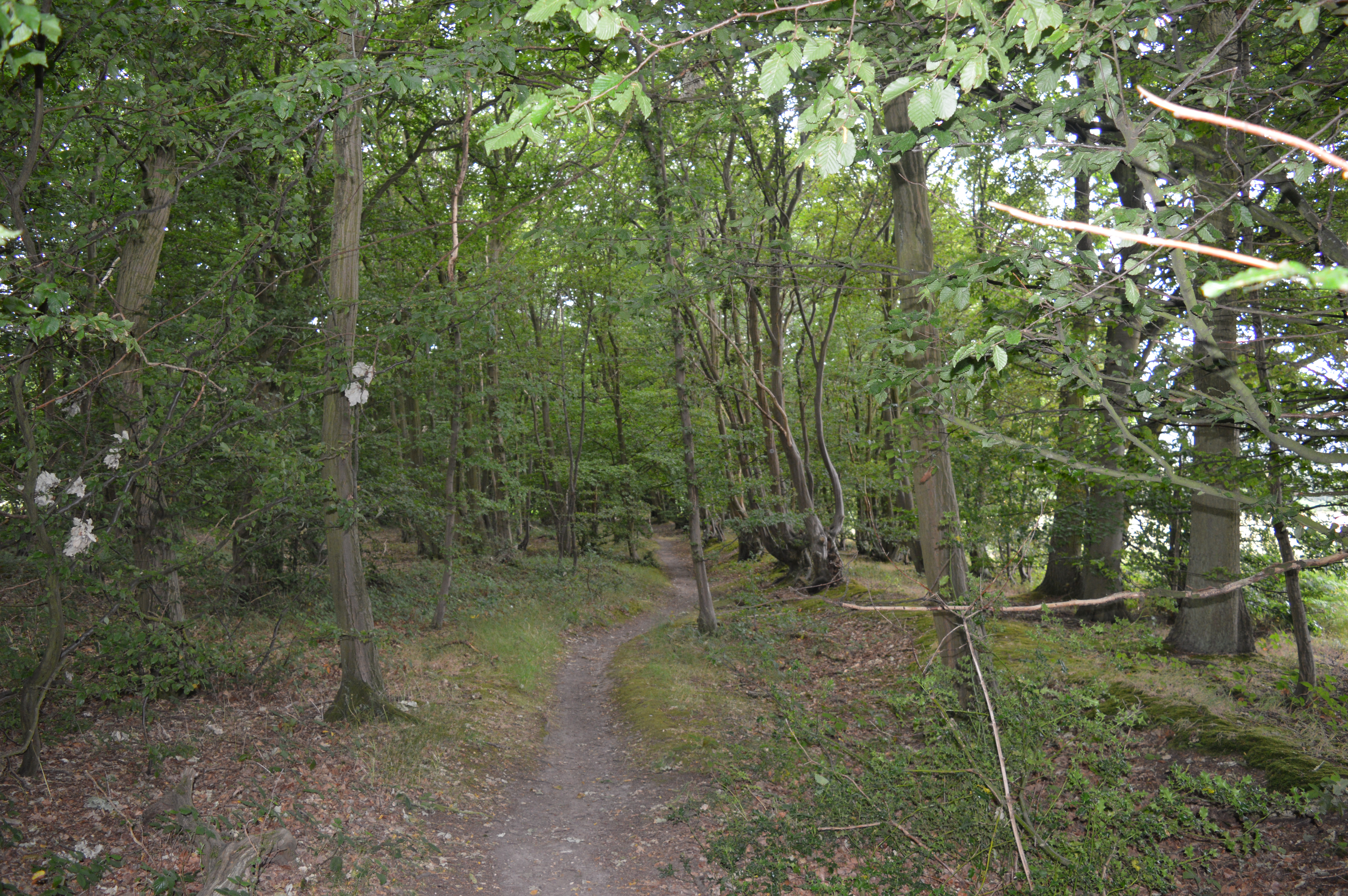

Stocking Springs Wood is a 1.1-hectare (2.7-acre) nature reserve between Ayot St Lawrence and Ayot St Peter in Welwyn Hatfield district in Hertfordshire. It is managed by the Herts and Middlesex Wildlife Trust.

The site is hornbeam woodland, and it is divided into sections which are coppiced every sixteen years. Older trees are gnarled in shape as a result. In spring there are bluebells and wild daffodils on the forest floor, and other plants such as wood anemone and early purple orchids are indicators that the woodland is ancient. Breeding birds include nuthatch, great spotted woodpecker and treecreepers.

There is access from Codicote Road west of Hill Farm Lane and from a bridleway from Ayot St Lawrence to Codicote Road.
