= Frogmore Meadows =

Nature reserve in Hertfordshire and Buckinghamshire, England

Coordinates: 51.6796°N 0.52468°W

- Site of Special Scientific Interest
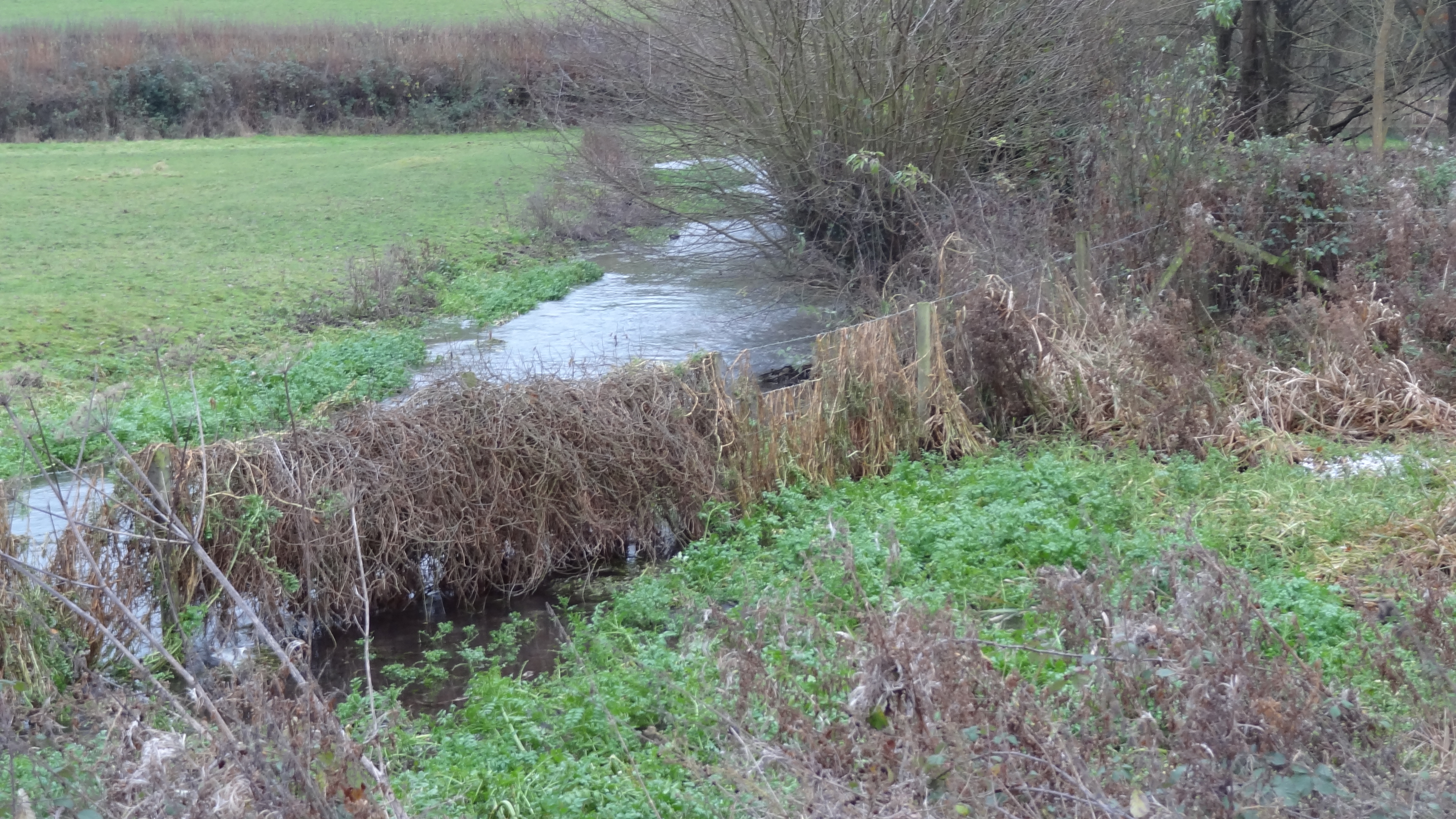
- Frogmore Meadows and the River Chess
- Location of Frogmore Meadows.
- Area of search: Hertfordshire; Buckinghamshire
- Grid reference: TQ021989
- Interest: Biological
- Area: 4.6 ha (11 acres)
- Notification date: 1986
- Location map: Magic Map

Frogmore Meadows is a 4.6-hectare (11-acre) biological Site of Special Scientific Interest in Hertfordshire and Buckinghamshire, north of the village of Chenies. It consists of two meadows in the Chilterns Area of Outstanding Natural Beauty, next to the River Chess, one of which is a Hertfordshire and Middlesex Wildlife Trust nature reserve. The planning authorities are Three Rivers District Council, Dacorum Borough Council and Chiltern District Council.

The site has marshy areas and fens next to the river, damp grassland and drier, more acidic areas. The river bank has water voles, and damp areas are dominated by meadow foxtail and Yorkshire fog, with some marsh marigold and marsh bedstraw. Plants in drier areas include betony, and mature hedgerows have a wide variety of invertebrates. There are butterflies such as skippers, meadow browns, ringlets and marbled whites.

The site is open at all times and a footpath between Sarratt and Chenies affords access.
