= Longspring Wood =

Small Nature Reserve in Southern England

Coordinates: 51.720063°N 0.421301°W

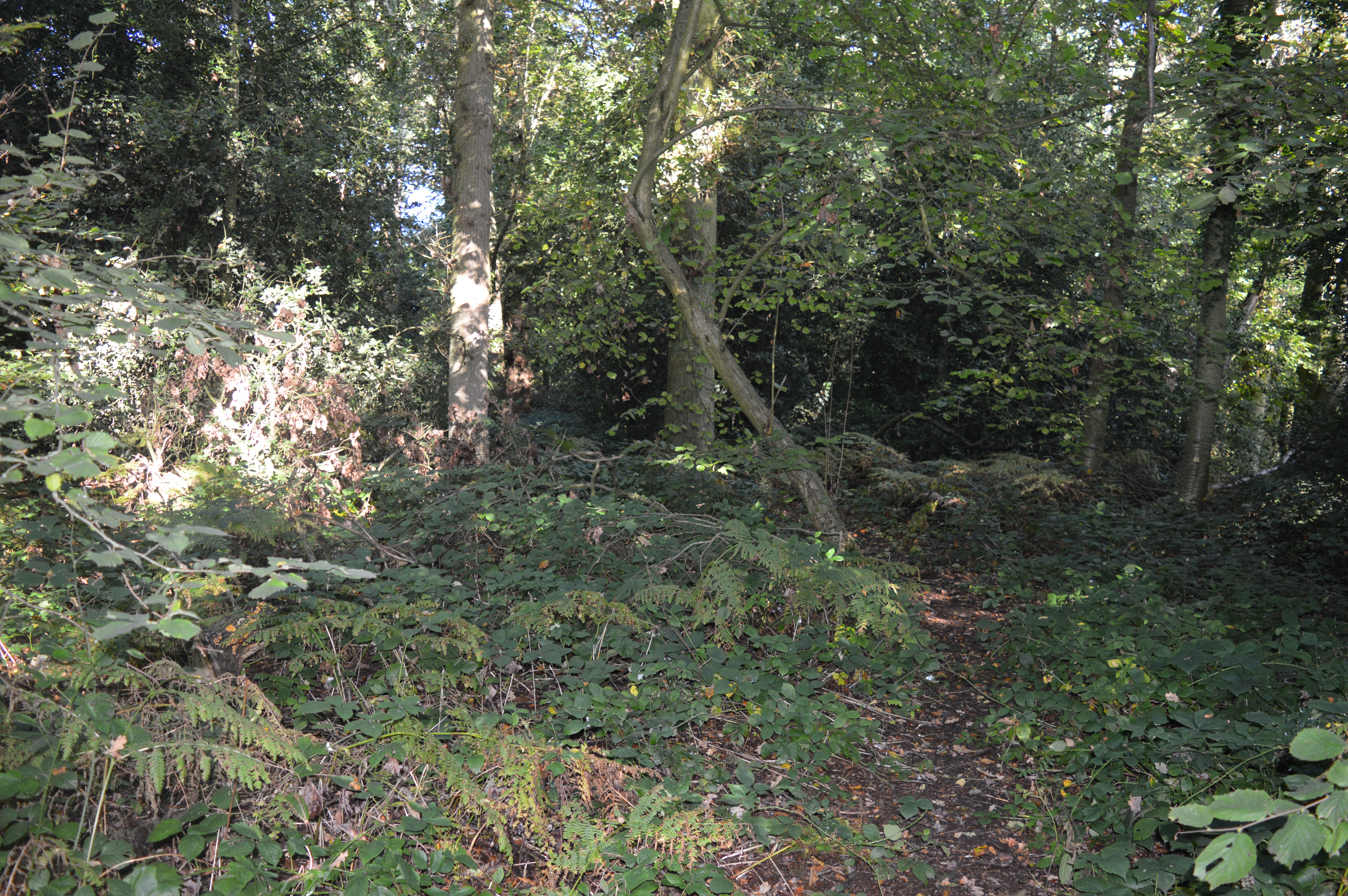

Longspring Wood is a 1.2-hectare (3.0-acre) nature reserve managed by the Herts and Middlesex Wildlife Trust in Kings Langley in Hertfordshire.

The main trees in this small wood are oak, ash, wild cherry and hazel, and there is a display of bluebells in the spring. Birds include warblers, finches and tits, and there are mammals such as foxes and badgers.

There is access by a footpath between houses in Toms Lane.
