= Kingsmead School =

Kingsmead School may refer to:

- Kingsmead School, Enfield, a secondary school in Enfield, London, England
- Kingsmead School, Hednesford, a secondary school in Hednesford, Staffordshire, England
- Kingsmead School, Hoylake, an independent school in Hoylake, Merseyside, England
- Kingsmead School, Wiveliscombe, a secondary school in Wiveliscombe, Somerset, England

== See also ==
- Kingsmead College
- Kingsmead (disambiguation)
