= Tewin Orchard and Hopkyns Wood =

English nature reserve

Coordinates: 51.82418°N 0.160822°W

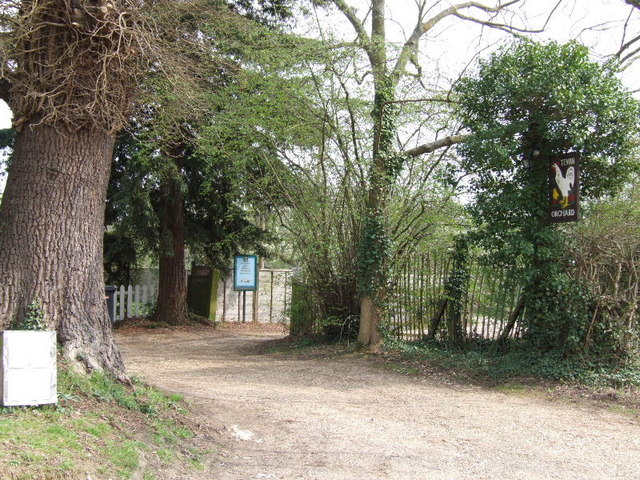
Entrance to Tewin Orchard

Tewin Orchard and Hopkyns Wood is a 4.3-hectare (11-acre) nature reserve in Tewin in Hertfordshire. It is managed by the Herts and Middlesex Wildlife Trust.

Tewin Orchard is an eighty-year old fruit orchard donated to the trust by its last private owner, Molly Hopkyns. It has a variety of Hertfordshire apple varieties, including the Hitchin Pippin, which was propagated from the last known tree. The orchard attracts many birds, such as fieldfares and redwings. Hopkyns Wood is dominated by oaks and hornbeams, with ground flora of bluebells and ramsons. It also has a mature badger sett.

There is access from a footpath from Orchard Road.
