= Willowmead =

Nature reserve in north Hertford

Coordinates: 51.792565°N 0.095404°W

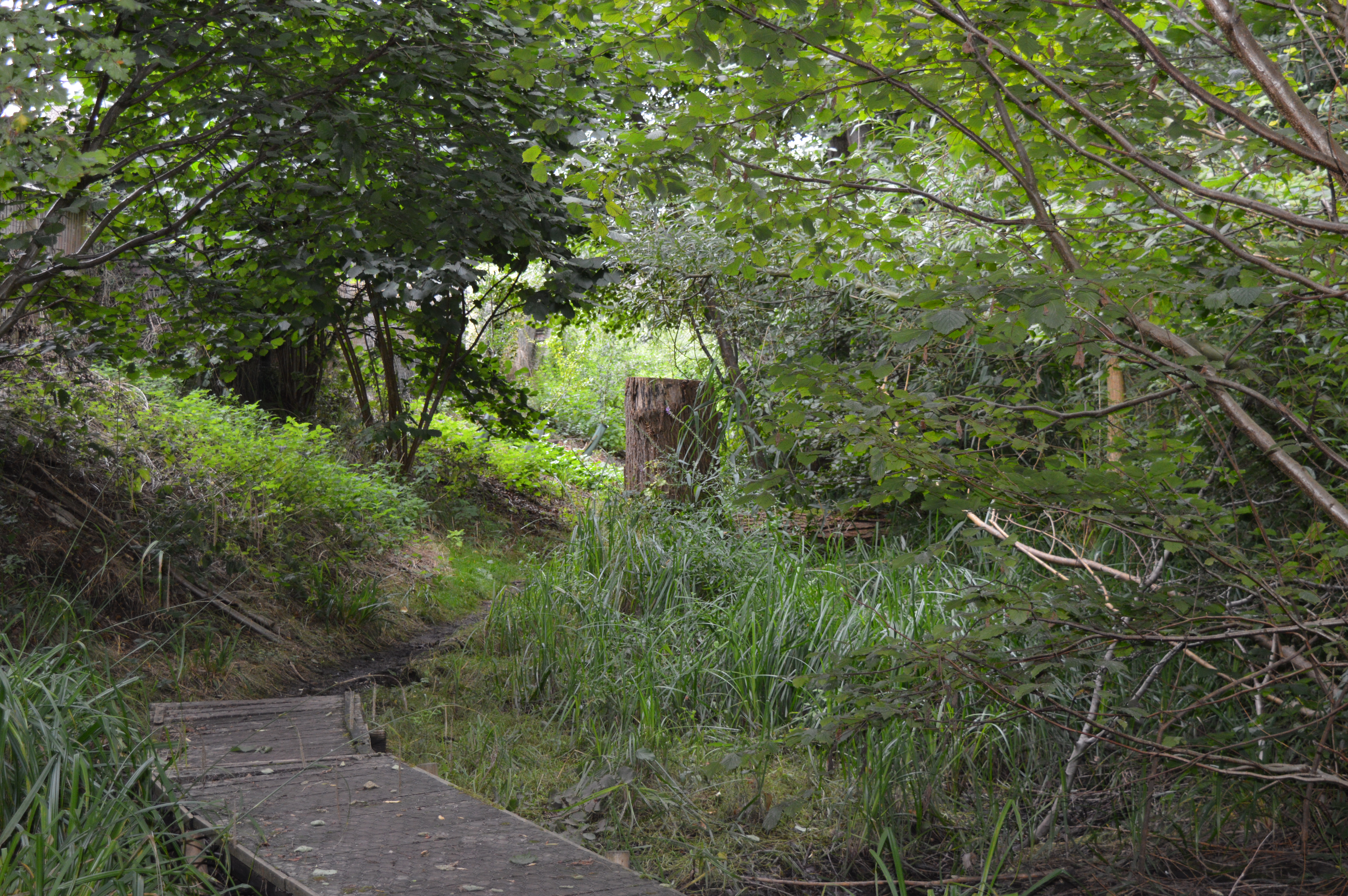

Willowmead is a 1.5-hectare (3.7-acre) nature reserve in north Hertford. It is managed by the Herts and Middlesex Wildlife Trust.

The site is on the bank of the River Mimram, and it is wet woodland, mainly of alder trees which are often mature. Water voles and otters have been seen in the river. Water birds include kingfishers, mallards and mandarin ducks. There are breeding birds in the woodland, such as lesser spotted woodpeckers and spotted flycatcher.

There is access from the road called Becketts.
