= Uxbridge Alderglade =

Nature reserve in Greater London, England

Coordinates: 51.5567°N 0.4767°W

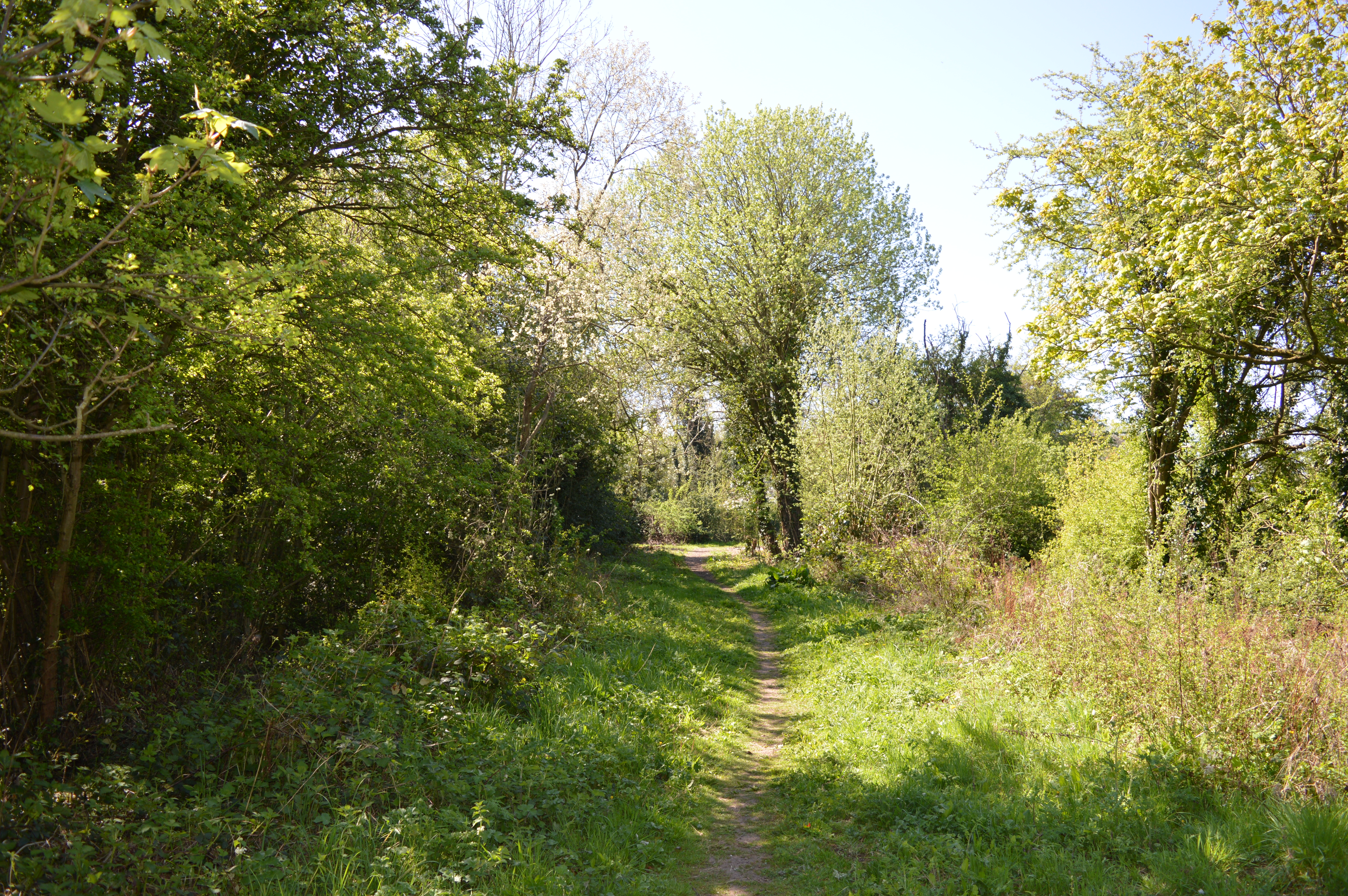

Uxbridge Alderglade is a 2.9-hectare (7.2-acre) nature reserve in Uxbridge in the London Borough of Hillingdon. It is managed by the Herts and Middlesex Wildlife Trust.

The site is a narrow strip of land between the Frays River and the Shire Ditch, and it was formerly a railway embankment on the Uxbridge High Street branch. It is wet woodland of crack willow and alder, with areas of marsh. Plants include birds-foot trefoil and small toadflax, and there are mammals such as the rare Brandt's bat, as well as stoats, weasels and moles.

There is access from Braybourne Close and from a footpath which starts in Harefield Road opposite Gravel Hill, and then crosses the Frays River by a footbridge.
