= Blagrove Common =

Protected area in Hertfordshire, England

Coordinates: 51.9868°N 0.0704°W

- Site of Special Scientific Interest
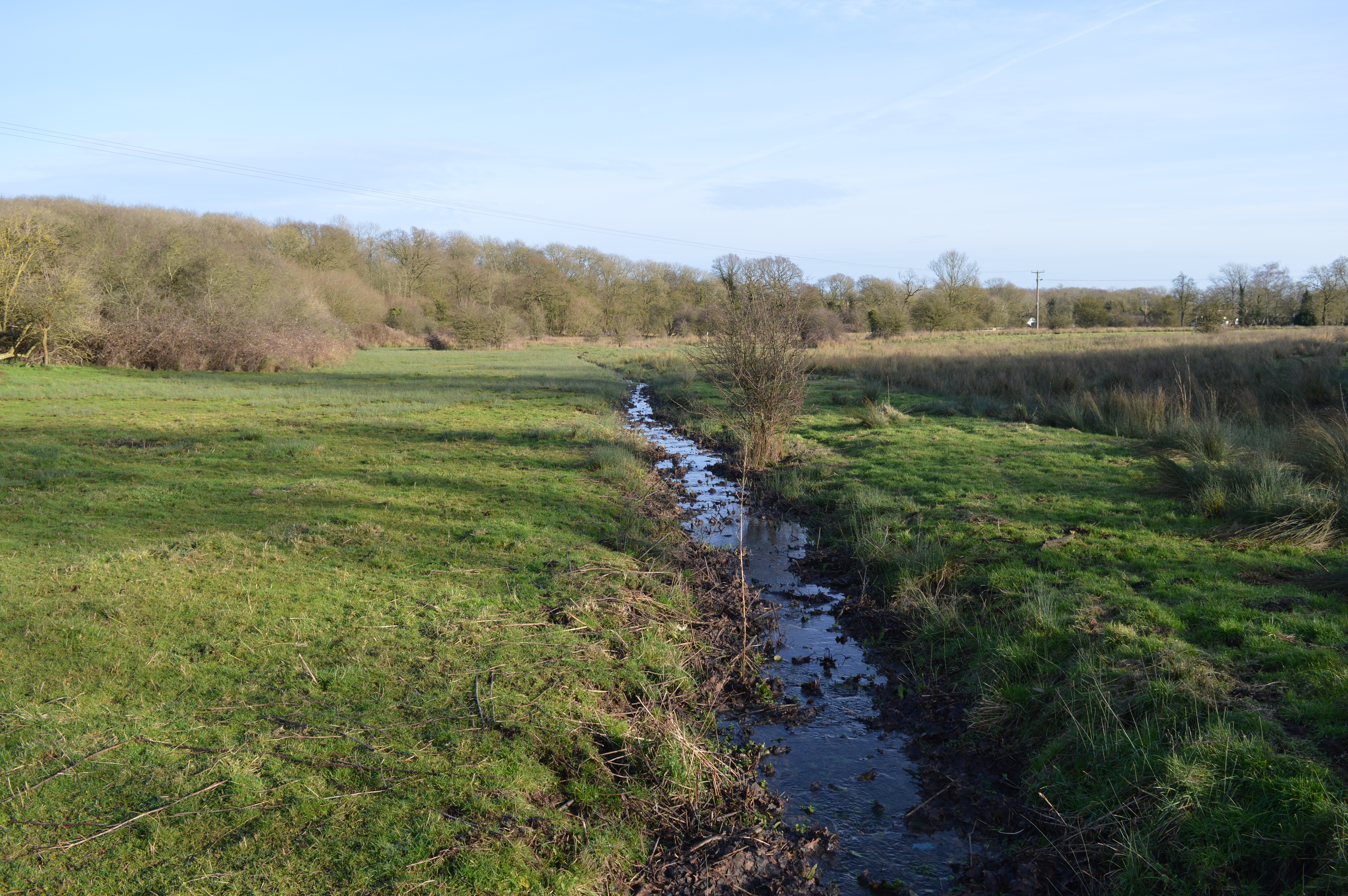
- Location of Blagrove Common.
- Area of search: Hertfordshire
- Grid reference: TL326338
- Interest: Biological
- Area: 4.0 ha (9.9 acres)
- Notification date: 1985
- Location map: Magic Map

Blagrove Common is a 4.0-hectare (9.9-acre) Site of Special Scientific Interest in Green End near Sandon in Hertfordshire. It is managed by the Hertfordshire and Middlesex Wildlife Trust, and the planning authority is North Hertfordshire District Council.

The site is one of the few areas of unimproved marshy grassland in east Hertfordshire. It is crossed by a stream and has a rich diversity of vegetation, including a variety of orchids. Kestrels often hunt mice and voles, which are common on the site.

There is access from Beckfield Lane next to the house called Blagrove. In some areas there is treacherous deep mud.

== See also ==
- List of Sites of Special Scientific Interest in Hertfordshire
