= Broad Colney Lakes =

Nature reserve in Hertfordshire, England

Coordinates: 51.7161°N 0.30056°W

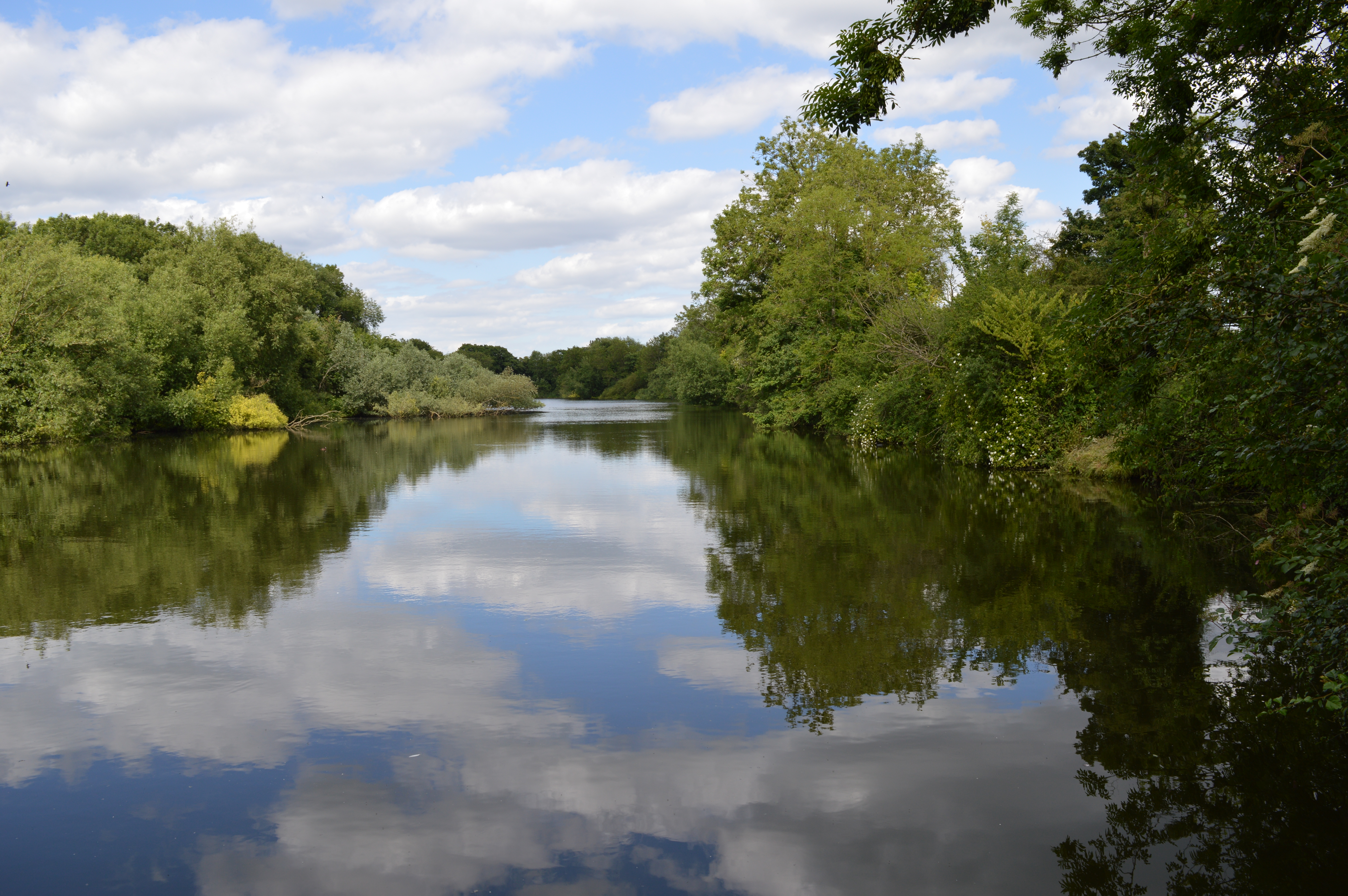

Broad Colney Lakes is an 11 hectare nature reserve previously managed by Herts and Middlesex Wildlife Trust in London Colney in Hertfordshire. It has recently been sold to an anonymous buyer but reports in The Herts Advertiser says "the selected buyer has stated that the site will continue to be used for fishing, with the woodland managed for the benefit of wildlife.” It has three lakes, created as a result of gravel extraction in the 1920s. Otters travel through Long Lake on their journeys along the River Colne, which flows through the lake, and great crested grebes nest at the edge. Small Lake is marshy and a breeding area for fish, while North Lake has tufted ducks, coots and mallards.

There is access from Water Lane, between Shenley Lane and Waterside, which runs along the south-eastern edge of Long Lake.
