= Mid Colne Valley =

Protected area in London and Buckinghamshire, England

Coordinates: 51.593°N 0.494°W

- Site of Special Scientific Interest
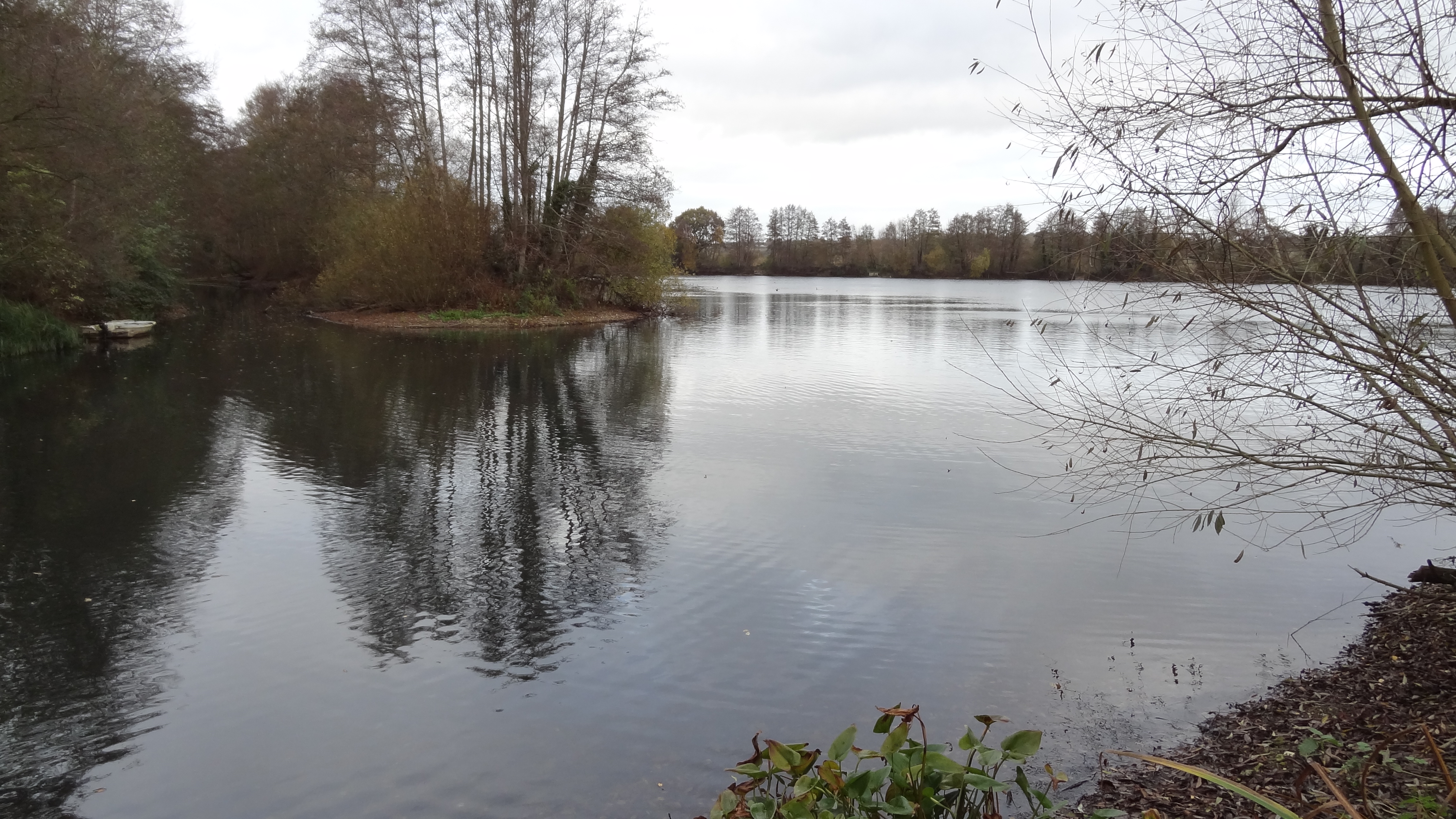
- Korda Lake
- Location of Mid Colne Valley.
- Area of search: Greater London; Buckinghamshire
- Grid reference: TQ043896
- Interest: Biological
- Area: 132.0 ha (326 acres)
- Notification date: 1985
- Location map: Magic Map

Mid Colne Valley is a 132 hectare biological Site of Special Scientific Interest in Harefield in the London Borough of Hillingdon and Denham in South Buckinghamshire. Its main importance lies in its extensive diversity of birdlife in lakes in former gravel pits.

The site is divided into three areas. The great majority is in an area of four lakes bounded on the west by the River Colne and on the east by the Grand Union Canal. The river forms the boundary between Greater London to the east and Buckinghamshire to the west, and west of the river in Denham is a small area called Ranston Covert. The SSSI also includes a field called Coppermill Down east of the canal.

== Broadwater Lake ==
The main area of the site is called Broadwater Lake after its principal body of water, and it is part of the Colne Valley regional park. The lakes were created by dredging for sand and gravel between the 1960s and the 1980s. To the south is Korda Lake, and then to the north of it Harefield Lake next to the Grand Union Canal, with Long Pond adjacent to it by the river. North again is Broadwater Lake, which at 80 hectares occupies over half the entire SSSI. Natural England regards the condition of the area as 'favourable'.

Korda Lake, Long Pond, the River Colne and the western side of Broadwater Lake form the Broadwater Lake nature reserve, which is managed by the Hertfordshire and Middlesex Wildlife Trust. Harefield Lake is private land owned by an aggregates company, and silting caused by aggregate washing is a matter of concern to Natural England. The lakes are used for fishing, but this is prohibited between 15 March and 15 June to prevent damage to the SSSI.

Broadwater Lake is unusual in having a number of small islands. It is significant for its breeding wetland birds and over-wintering water birds. Wintering birds which are present in nationally important numbers are great crested grebes, cormorants, shovellers and tufted ducks, and the number of gadwalls is internationally significant. The River Colne is important for bats, particularly Daubentons. The area also has ancient woodland.

There is access from Moorhall Road close to the Colne River bridge.

== Ranston Covert ==
Ranston Covert in Denham is the only part of the site in Buckinghamshire. It was formerly a separate SSSI. It is a 26 hectare area of woodland and scrub between the Colne River and Denham Way. It has a variety of breeding birds and its status is described as favourable.

== Coppermill Down ==
The SSSI includes a 6 hectare field east of the Grand Union Canal described in the Natural England citation as Coppermill Down, although it is not known by that name locally. It is one of the few remaining examples of unimproved chalk grassland in Greater London, and is notable for the pyramidal orchid and the bee orchid. Its status in September 2011 was described as 'unfavourable declining' due to inadequate grazing. The field is crossed by a footpath between Jacks Lane and Park Lane.

== High Speed 2 ==
The High Speed 2 high-speed rail line crosses the site on the Colne Valley Viaduct.

== See also ==
- List of Sites of Special Scientific Interest in Greater London
- List of Sites of Special Scientific Interest in Buckinghamshire
