= Old Park Wood =

Natural area in Greater London, England

Coordinates: 51.6108°N 0.48648°W

- Site of Special Scientific Interest
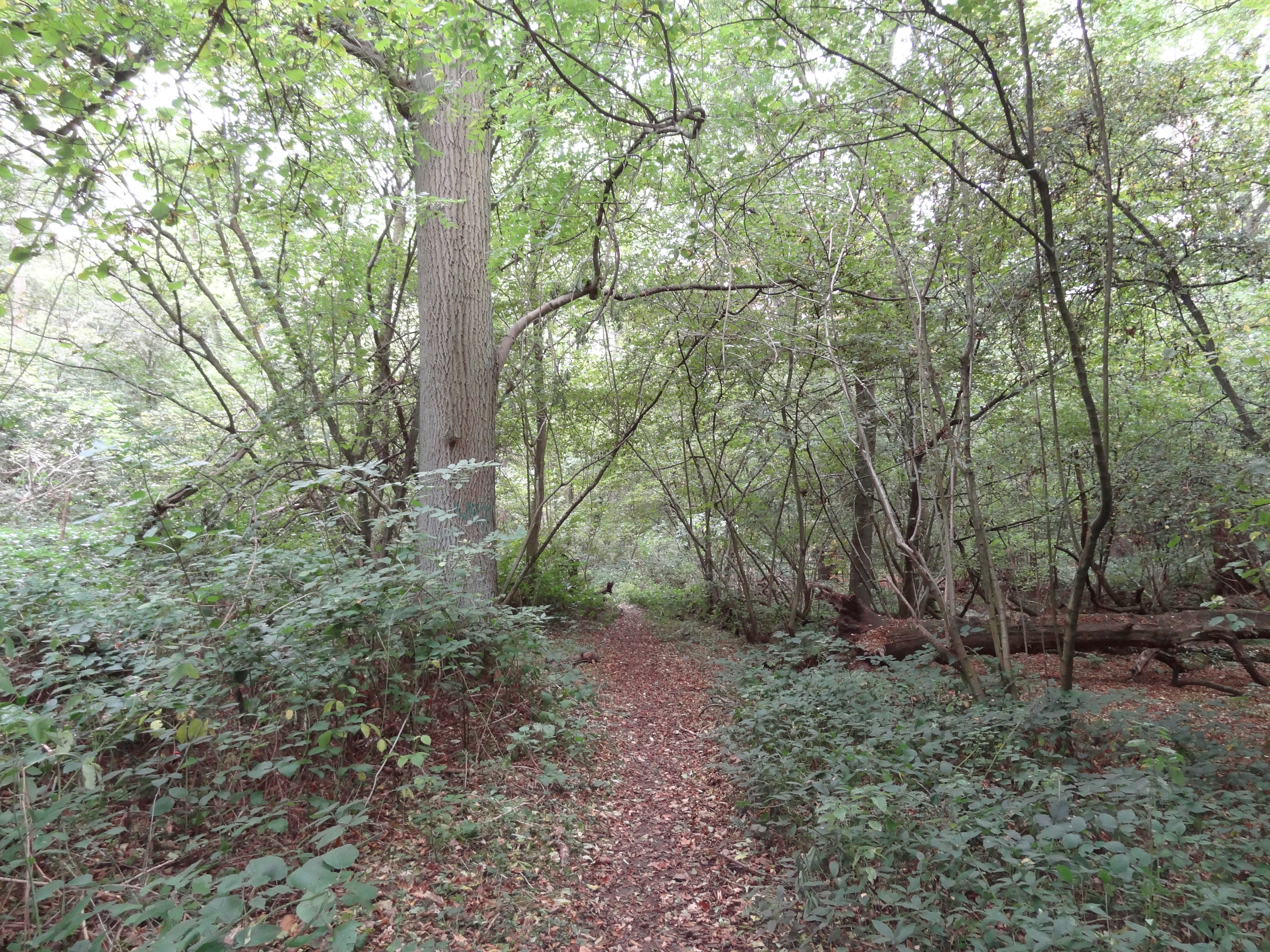
- Location of Old Park Wood.
- Area of search: Greater London
- Grid reference: TQ046913
- Interest: Biological
- Area: 16.7 ha (41 acres)
- Notification date: 1984
- Location map: Magic Map

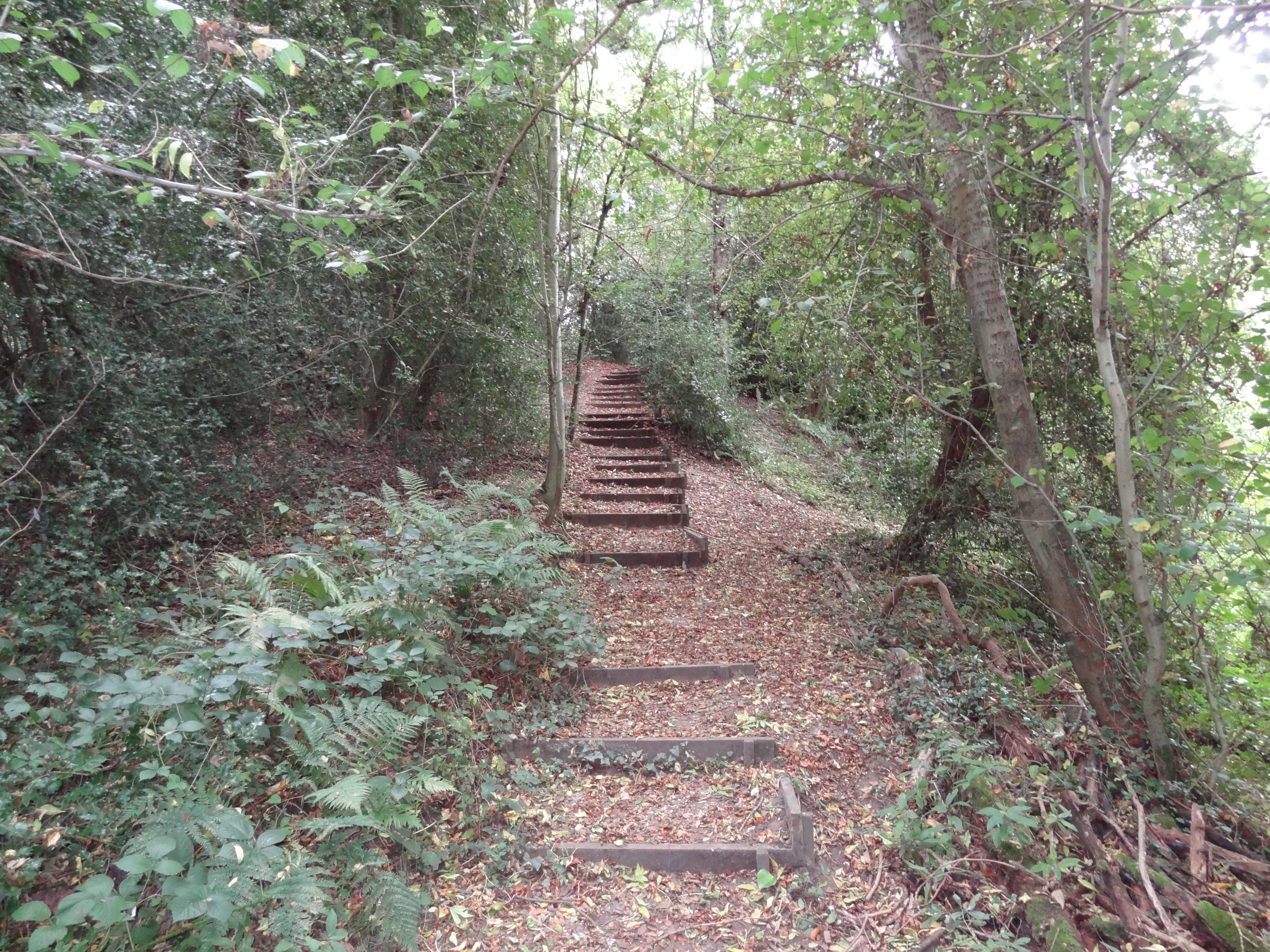
Steps

Old Park Wood is a 16.7-hectare (41-acre) Site of Special Scientific Interest (SSSI) in Harefield in the London Borough of Hillingdon. The southeast part is an 8-hectare (20-acre) nature reserve owned and managed by the Hertfordshire and Middlesex Wildlife Trust.

The site is ancient woodland which dates back to the Domesday Book. It was part of Harefield Park, which had an eighteenth-century house which later became the site of Harefield Hospital.

The hilly site is almost wholly wooded, and one of the floristically richest ancient woods in the London area. Flowers in spring include a carpet of bluebells together with yellow archangel, lesser celandine, wood anemone and the rare coral root bittercress (Cardamine bulbifera) and thin-spiked wood-sedge (Carex strigosa).

The site is dissected by small valleys and has a variety of types of soil and plants. The trees are mainly oak, birch, hornbeam and ash. Golden saxifrage and marsh marigolds grow along small streams and there is a pond which is important for dragonflies and invertebrates. There is a good variety of birds, including nuthatch and all three British species of woodpecker.

The site lies behind Harefield Hospital. There is no access from the hospital, but a footpath along its border fence from Hill End Road leads to the Herts & Middlesex nature reserve. This may be closed as a developer disputes the right of way. Another footpath between Summerhouse Lane and Hill End Road goes through the SSSI, skirting the northern boundary of the nature reserve. Section 13 of the London LOOP goes along this footpath.

== See also ==
- List of Sites of Special Scientific Interest in Greater London
- Hillingdon parks and open spaces
