= Hawkins Wood =

Nature reserve in Hertfordshire, England

Coordinates: 51.997768°N 0.051745°W

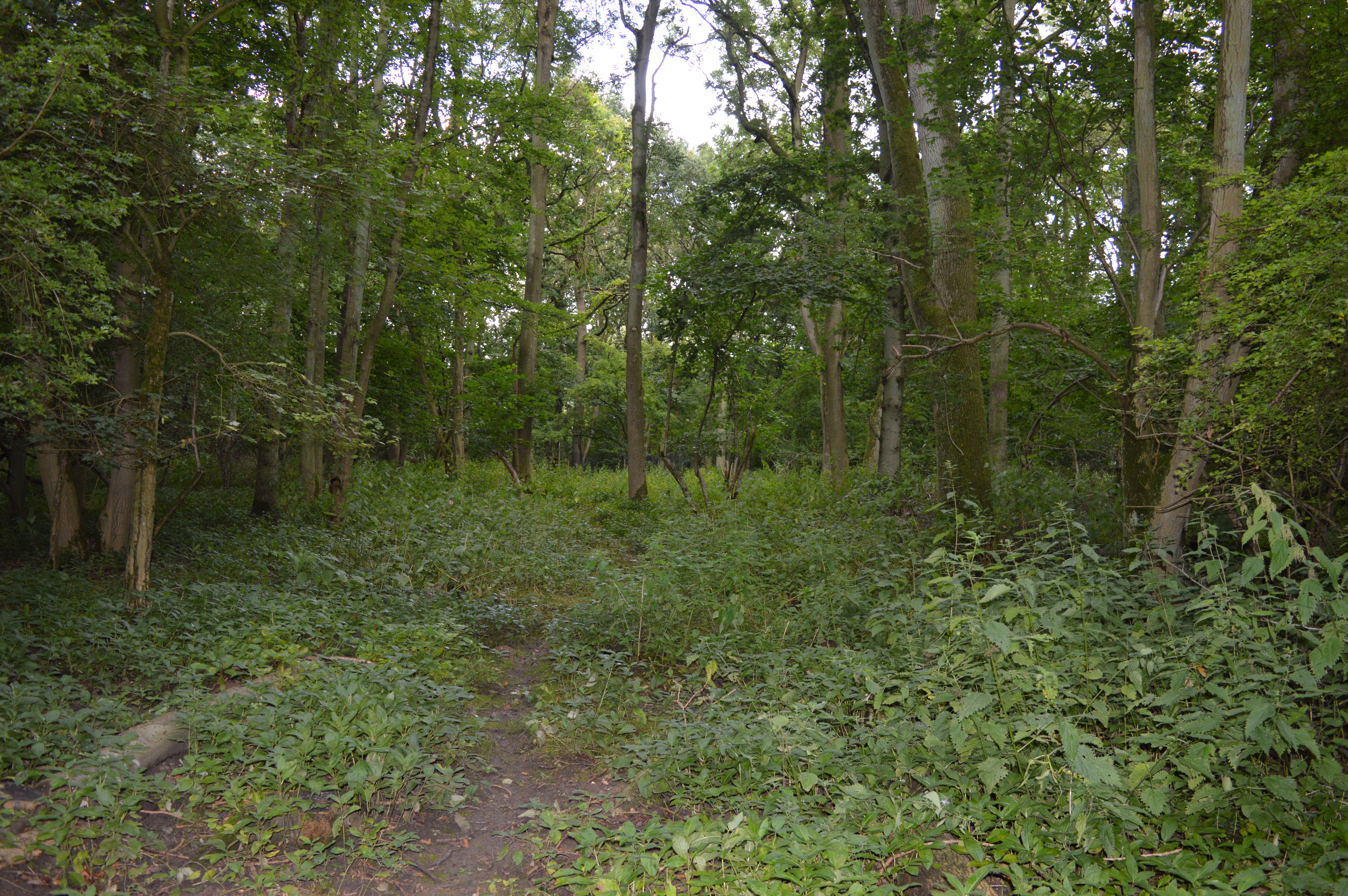

Hawkins Wood is a 10 hectare nature reserve south of Therfield in Hertfordshire. It is managed by the Herts and Middlesex Wildlife Trust.

The wood is thought to be named after a John Hawkins who is mentioned in documents dated 1676. It is divided by medieval banks and ditches into north, south and central sections. It has woods, fields and hedges, and birds include bullfinch, linnet and yellowhammer. There are also brown hares and deer.

There is access from a track called Collins Green, which the Icknield Way Trail runs along.
