= Kingsmead Viaduct =

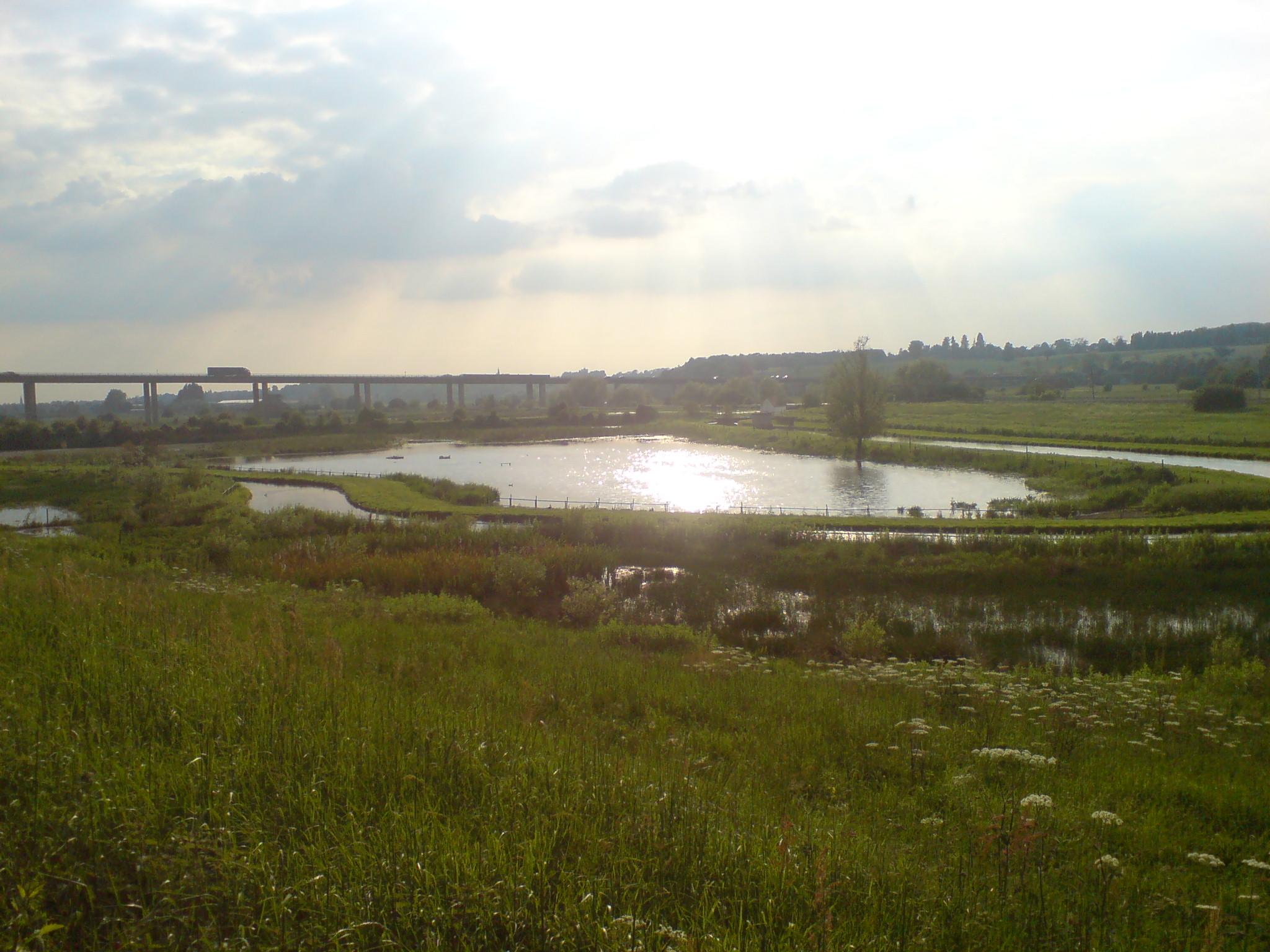
- The Kingsmead Viaduct viewed from the east (downstream) from Ware, approximately 500 metres away
- Coordinates: 51.8094°N 0.0516°W; TL 344 141
- Carries: dual 2-lane carriageways
- Crosses: River Lea, New River, Hertford East branch line
- Locale: Ware
- Maintained by: Hertfordshire County Council

Characteristics
- Design: Concrete Box girder bridge
- Total length: 35.6 chains (716 m)
- Height: 65 feet (20 m)
- No. of spans: 19

History
- Constructed by: Kier Ltd
- Construction start: November 1973
- Construction cost: £3.6 million (£19.1 million in 2020 pounds)
- Opened: 17 August 1976

Location
- Interactive map of Kingsmead Viaduct

The Kingsmead Viaduct (or Kings Meads Viaduct is a raised dual-carriageway viaduct of the A10 road between Hertford and Ware, Hertfordshire, England. It carries the A10 over the River Lea, the New River and the Hertford East branch line.

The road was originally constructed as a trunk route by the Highways Agency as the second part of a two-phase improvement of the A10 between Ware and Cheshunt. On 29 September 2006 the road was de-trunked, and the viaduct is now the responsibility of Hertfordshire County Council.

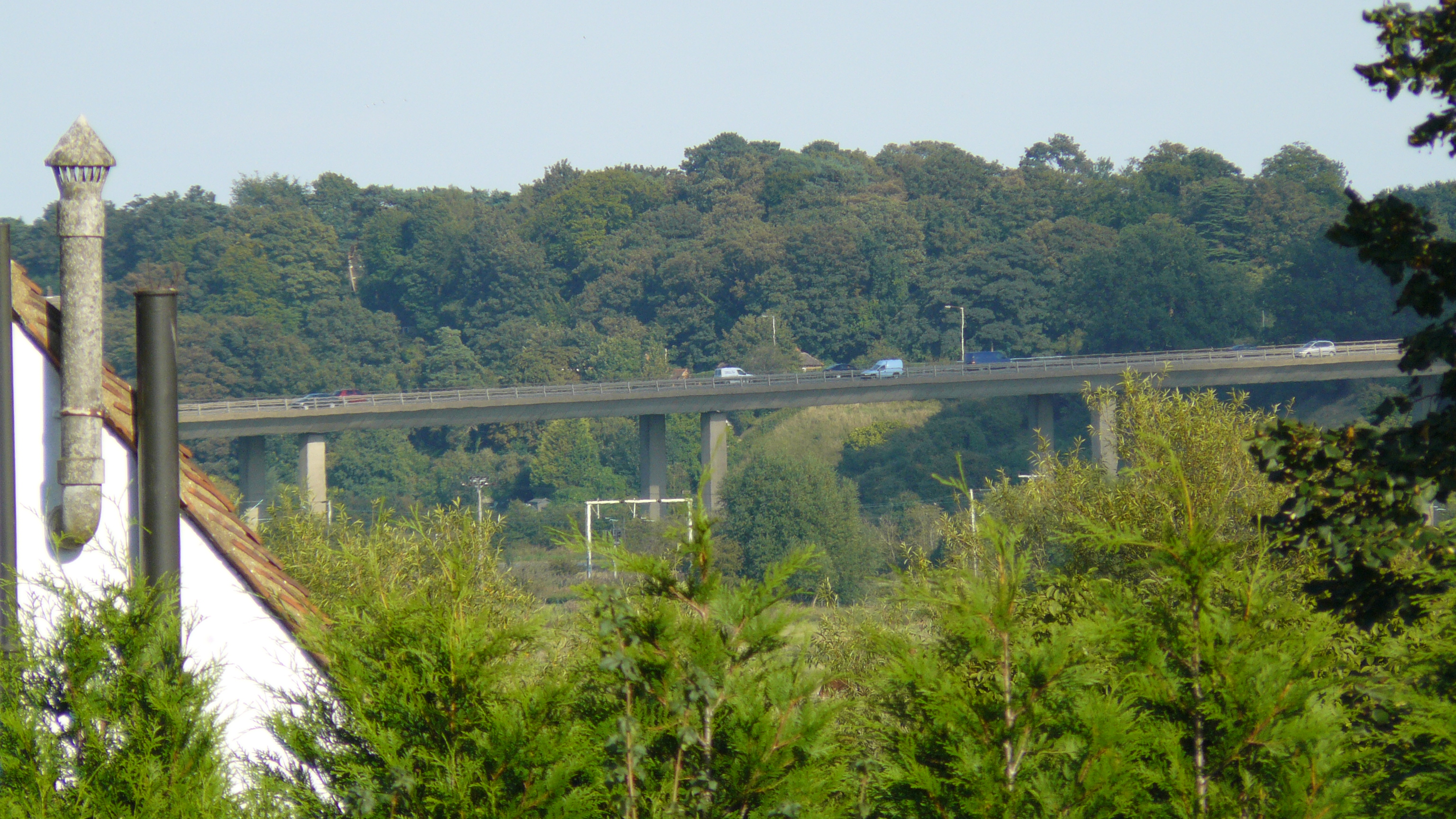
Kingsmead Viaduct viewed from Bengeo

== Major works ==
The expansion joints were replaced by the Highways Agency in July 2005.

Improvements to the bridge parapets to bring them up to modern standards were carried out by Hertfordshire Council from July to September 2008.

== Location ==
The bridge spans the Lea Valley, crossing the River Lea, the New River and the A119 road between the Rush Green Interchange near Hertford and the Westmill interchange (north-west of Ware).

Also running along the valley floor is the Hertford East Branch Line, which the viaduct crosses between Ware and the Hertford East terminus. The viaduct crosses the King's Meads Nature Reserve.
