= Rye Meads =

Wetlands in Hertfordshire, England

Coordinates: 51.7760°N 0.0061°E

- Site of Special Scientific Interest
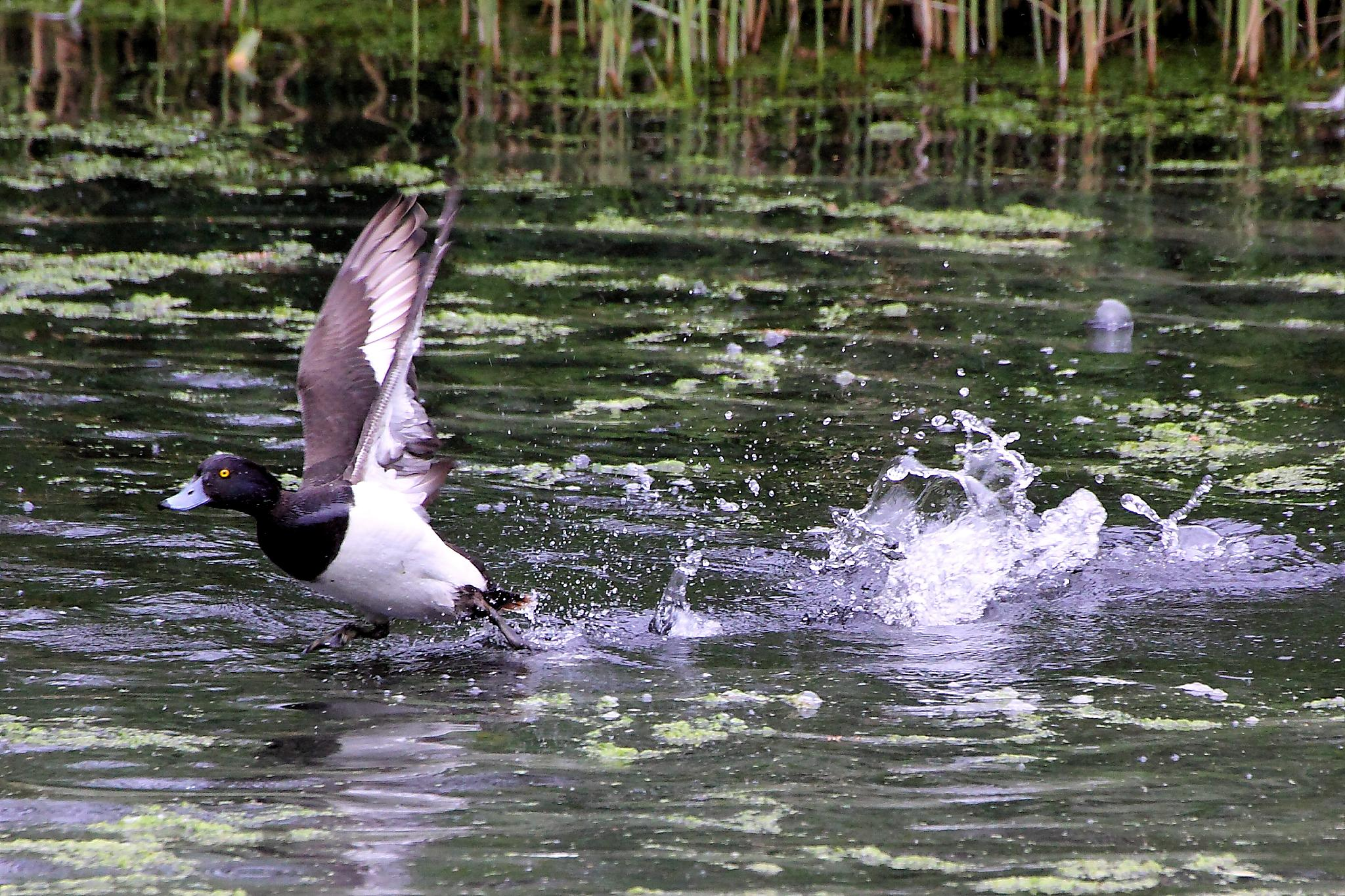
- Tufted duck in Rye Meads RSPB reserve
- Location of Rye Meads.
- Area of search: Hertfordshire
- Grid reference: TL385105
- Interest: Biological
- Area: 58.5 ha (145 acres)
- Notification date: 1989
- Location map: Magic Map

Rye Meads is a 58.5-hectare (145-acre) biological Site of Special Scientific Interest (SSSI) in Rye House, Hoddesdon, Hertfordshire. It is one of series of wetlands and reservoirs situated along the River Lea, to the north-east of London. It is part of the Lea Valley Ramsar site (a group of internationally important wetland sites) and a Special Protection Area.

== Operations and access ==
The SSSI is divided into three areas:

- North of Rye Road is the Rye Meads nature reserve, which is open to the public.
  - The western half of this nature reserve, next to the River Lea in the Lee Valley Regional Park, is managed by the Royal Society for the Protection of Birds (RSPB). The RSPB reserve has ten birdwatching hides, trails and a visitor centre. Birds include kingfisher, snipe, green sandpiper, shoveler, gadwall and tufted duck.
  - The eastern half is managed by the Hertfordshire and Middlesex Wildlife Trust (HMWT). The HMWT site is an ancient flood meadow which has a variety of habitats including reedbed, marshy grassland and fen. It is grazed by ponies and water buffalo.
- The SSSI also includes a meadow and lagoons owned by Thames Water, south of Rye Road, which are not open to the public.

The entrance to RSPB Rye Meads in October 2026.

The entrance to the nature reserve is on Rye Road. There is a path around the site, but a one-way turnstile blocks wheelchairs and pushchairs, and only allows access from the RSPB half to the HMWT area, not vice versa.
