= Gobions Wood =

Nature reserve in Hertfordshire, England

Coordinates: 51.721262°N 0.192509°W

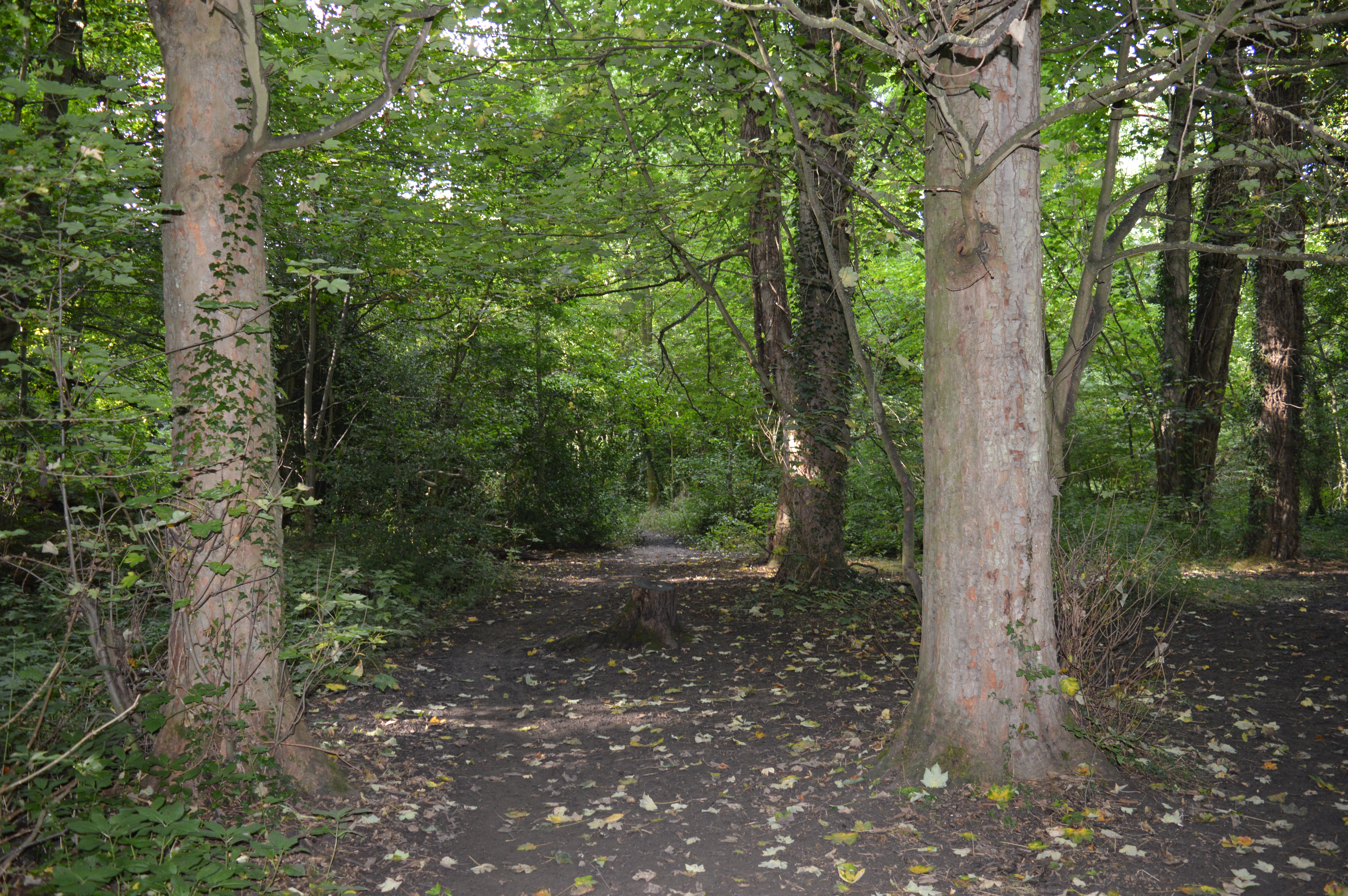

Gobions Wood is a 36 hectare nature reserve managed by the Herts and Middlesex Wildlife Trust in Brookmans Park in Hertfordshire. The site was formerly owned by the Gobions Woodland Trust, a registered charity which was closed down in 2013 because it had ceased to exist.

The site is mainly woodland, but additional habitats are grassland, hedges and ponds. There is also the remains of an eighteenth-century pleasure garden. 558 species of fungi have been found, two of which have not been recorded previously in Britain and over 100 which are scarce in Hertfordshire. Birds include blackcaps, chiffchaffs and nuthatches.

There is access by a footpath from Bluebridge Avenue.
