= Alpine Meadow, Berkhamsted =

Nature reserve in Hertfordshire, England

Alpine Meadow
- Site of Special Scientific Interest
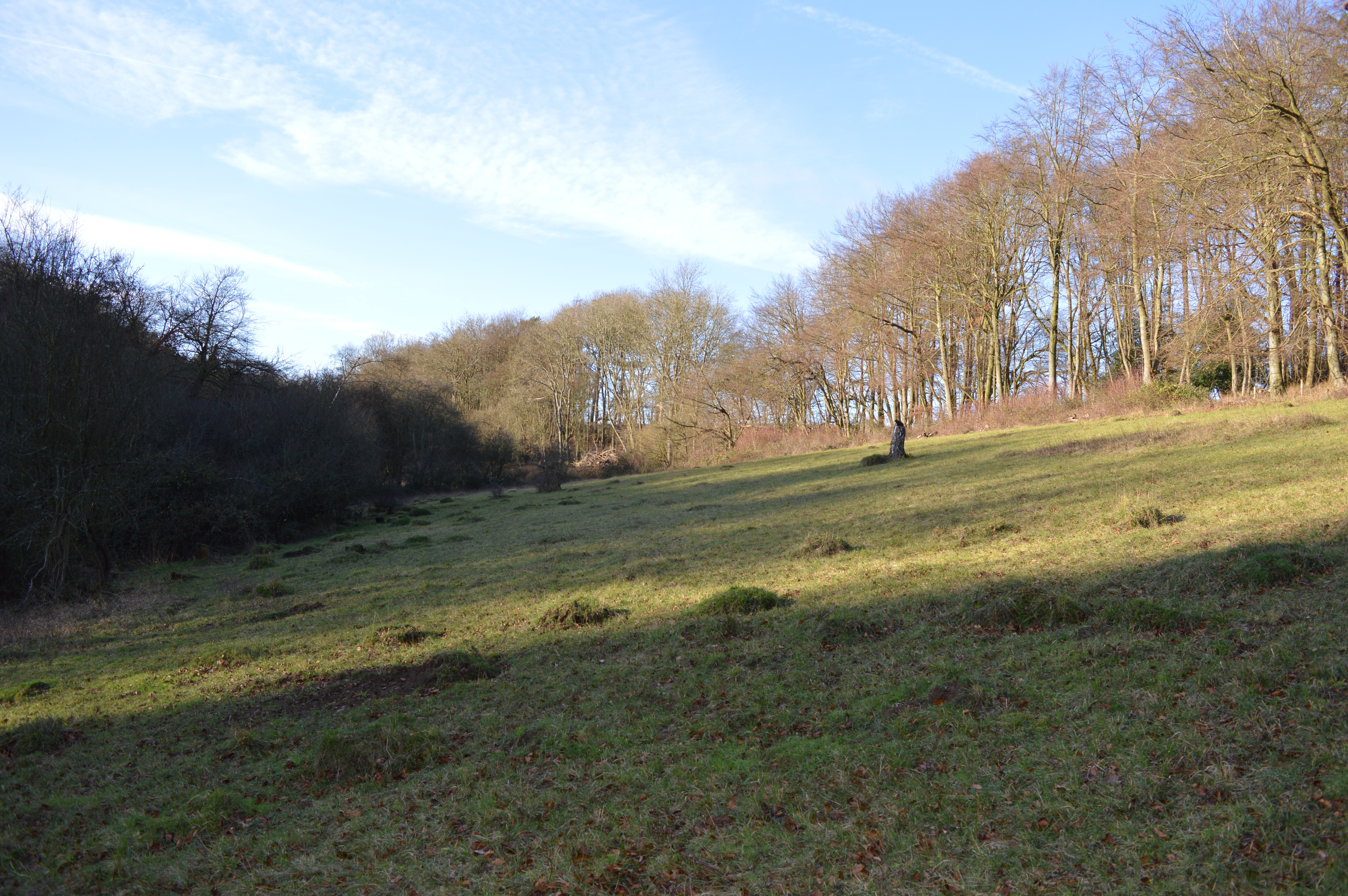

- Location within Hertfordshire
- Location of Alpine Meadow.
- Area of search: Hertfordshire
- Grid reference: SP989103
- Coordinates: 51.7826°N 0.5677°W
- Interest: Biological
- Area: 0.4 hectares (0.99 acres)
- Notification date: 1987
- Location map: Magic Map

Alpine Meadow is a 0.4 hectare nature reserve near Berkhamsted in Hertfordshire in the United Kingdom. It is a designated biological Site of Special Scientific Interest (SSSI), managed by the Hertfordshire and Middlesex Wildlife Trust and the planning authority is Dacorum Borough Council.

== Habitat ==
The small site is a steeply sloping area of meadow and woodland, and it has been designated an SSSI as a rare example of unimproved chalk grassland. Grass species include upright brome, false brome and sheep's fescue, and there are many orchids, especially common twayblade and common spotted orchid. There are also many butterflies, such as marbled white and the rare Duke of Burgundy. The woodland has birds such as green woodpeckers and finches.

The site is always open and there is access by a footpath from Bridle Way.

== See also ==
- List of Sites of Special Scientific Interest in Hertfordshire
