= King's Meads =

Nature reserve in Ware, Hertfordshire, England

Coordinates: 51.805211°N 0.044103°W

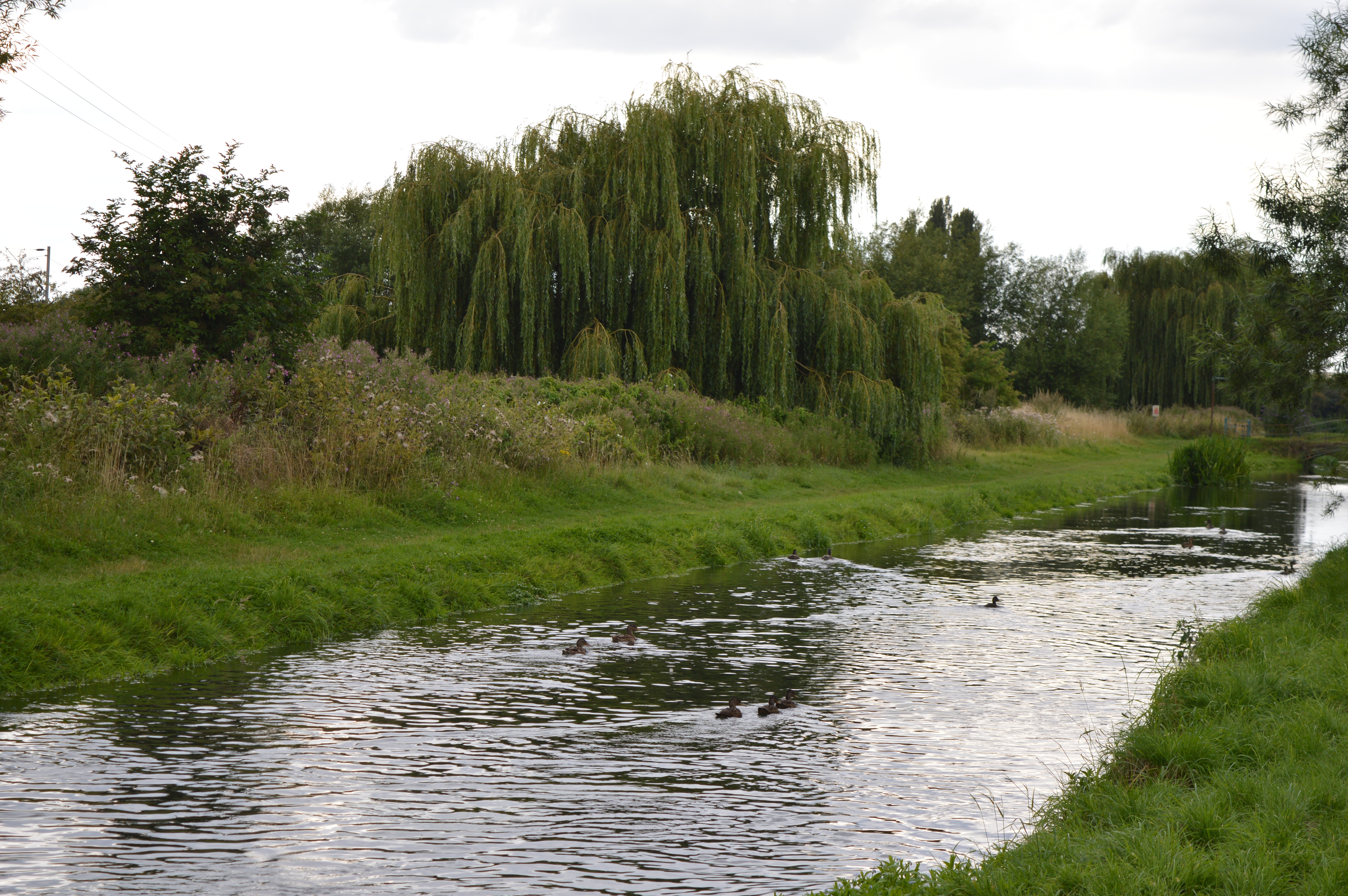
The New River runs through King's Meads

King's Meads is a nature reserve between the towns of Hertford and Ware in Hertfordshire. It is managed by the Herts and Middlesex Wildlife Trust, and with an area of 96 hectares (237 acres) it is the largest of the Trust's reserves. The site has been registered by the Trust as Common land, but the registration for some areas was disallowed due to objections.

The name King's Meads was given to what were previously known as The Meads by Herts and Middlesex Wildlife Trust in 2015, although the original King's Meads—sold by Charles I to Hertford Corporation in 1627 for £100, equivalent to £24,688 in 2023—form only a small part of the nature reserve. Other parts of The Meads, particularly in Ware, have been in private and communal ownership since the Middle Ages, with names such a Lady's Mead, Widows Mead, Mill Mead, Broad Mead and Chadwell Mead.

The site is water meadows which are subject to flooding in winter. 265 wildflower species have been recorded, including some which are rare in the county such as reflexed salt-marsh grass and lesser sea spurrey. It has large populations of water birds, and is an important site for over-wintering European stonechats. 119 bird species have been recorded.

There is access from the Lee Navigation towpath and from Mead Lane. The New River runs through the site, and the A10 road passes over it on the Kingsmead Viaduct.
