= Long Deans =

Nature reserve in Hertfordshire, England

Coordinates: 51.731157°N 0.444084°W

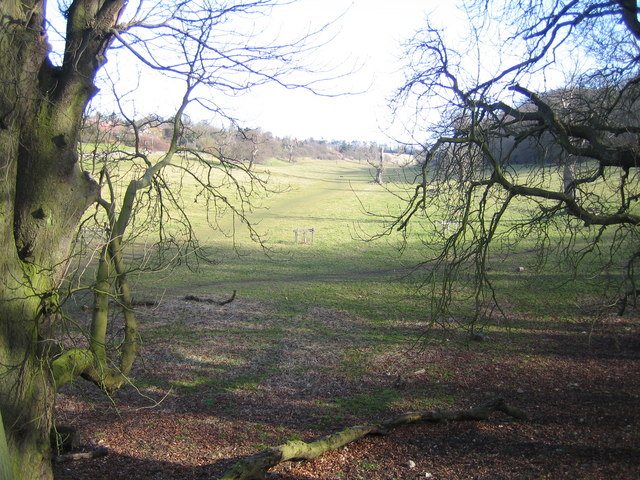

Long Deans is a 15 hectare nature reserve managed by the Herts and Middlesex Wildlife Trust in Nash Mills, between Kings Langley and Hemel Hempstead in Hertfordshire. It is neutral and chalk grassland and woodland with beech, ash, oak and wild cherry. Birds include common linnet, common bullfinch and song thrush, and the site is home to bats.

There is access from Bunkers Lane, opposite the entrance to Bunkers Park nature reserve.
