= Kingsmead Marsh =

Local nature reserve in Staffordshire, England

- Location within Staffordshire
- Location: Stafford, Staffordshire
- OS grid: SJ 925 234
- Coordinates: 52.8081°N 2.1127°W
- Area: 6 hectares (15 acres)
- Designation: Local nature reserve Site of Biological Importance
- Website: Kingsmead Marsh

Kingsmead Marsh is a local nature reserve near Stafford, in Staffordshire, England. Its area is about 6 hectares (15 acres), and it is designated a Grade 1 Site of Biological Importance.

== History and description ==
The marsh is a remaining part of a large area of marshland, to the north and east of the later town; this and the River Sow, to the west, made the location defensible. Stafford is said to have been founded about AD 700 by Beorhthelm (or Bertelin), a Mercian prince, who established a hermitage here. The Burh of Stafford was subsequently established in AD 913.

In the medieval period there was a mill, owned by the king, for which a mill pond, known as King's Pool, was created. The site later returned to marsh, and, known as Kingsmead, was probably used more recently for summer grazing of livestock.

The site was designated a local nature reserve (LNR) in December 2003. It supports a variety of flora and fauna, and there are plants not found locally such as purple loosestrife and brown sedge. The site is managed in order to protect and improve it; this includes coppicing of willow scrub which is encroaching from the edge of the site.
