= Coypu (dinghy) =

Class of small sailing dinghy

Development
- Name: Coypu

Boat
- Crew: 2

Hull
- Type: Monohull
- Construction: Fiberglass
- LOH: 3.510 metres (11 ft 6.2 in)
- Beam: 1.520 metres (4 ft 11.8 in)

Hull appendages
- Keel: Centreboard

Sails
- Upwind sail area: 8 square metres (86 sq ft)

The Coypu is a class of small sailing dinghy designed by Alan Buchanan. It is a highly stable boat, suitable for beginners, and is normally sailed by two people, although three can be accommodated comfortably.

== Design ==
The variants in the design of the coypu depend on the builder. The hull is normally glass-reinforced plastic construction, with buoyancy tanks on front, sides, and rear. The centreboard is metal, and the rudder is removable, either fixed (i.e. does not have a downhaul) or with a moveable blade.

Most Coypu mainsails are normally raised by feeding the luff into the track on the mast, although some variants have gunter rig sails. The mainsheet is fixed to the stern of the boat. A jib is used for normal use and only one size is available.

The boat is heavy in comparison with other dinghies, so traditionally they have proved popular at training centres where removing the boat from the water on a regular basis is not necessary. However, the design provides a stable boat in all weather, which is ideal for beginners, especially juniors.

Also, a "sea scout" version of the coypu dinghy is available.

== History ==
The Coypu is a rather old design of boat. It is possible to get replacement spares. The design of the boat meant that small boatyards and centres could build their own fleet easily, with assistance from a mould. The design also meant that they were easy to repair, and as a result, they have long service lives.

Previous centres known to have built Coypu hulls include:

- Bury Lake Young Mariners in Rickmansworth, Hertfordshire
- Herts Young Mariners Base in Hertfordshire (last manufactured in the 1970s)
- Barton Turf Outdoor Education Centre in Norfolk
- Dawn Craft of Wroxham, Norfolk
