= Gentlemen v Players =

Annual cricket match

Gentlemen v Players was a long-running series of cricket matches that began in July 1806 and was abolished in January 1963. It was a match between a team consisting of amateurs (the Gentlemen) and a team consisting of professionals (the Players) that reflected the English class structure of the 19th century. Typically, the professionals were working class people who earned their living by playing cricket, while the amateurs were middle- and upper-class products of the public school system, who were supposedly unpaid for playing. The professionals were paid wages by their county clubs and/or fees by match organisers, while the amateurs claimed expenses. However, while rules to distinguish amateurs from professionals were established by Marylebone Cricket Club (MCC), the system of allowable expenses was both controversial and complex, enabling some leading amateurs to be paid more than any professional for playing cricket.

In the introduction to his 1950 history of the Gentlemen v Players fixture, Pelham Warner calls it "the most time-honoured of all representative matches" and the "standard" match in English domestic cricket. Warner, who held a nostalgic view of the match, played for the Gentlemen 24 times between 1897 and 1919. However, Fred Trueman, who represented the Players eleven times between 1955 to 1962 and was their last-ever captain, took a completely different view: even though he was not a socialist, Trueman was "all for the abolition of amateurs" and their "afforded privileges", also calling the fixture "an anachronism" and "ludicrous business".

The fixture was discontinued on 31 January 1963 after the MCC abolished amateurism, with all cricketers becoming nominally professional (or Players): with this, the Gentlemen, and the raison d'etre for the fixture, ceased to exist.

No direct substitute was implemented; instead, England's first domestic one-day cricket competition began that summer.

Two matches were played in 1806, but the fixture was not arranged again until 1819. It then became an annual event, usually played at least twice each season (except in 1826, 1828, 1915–1918 and 1940–1945). It was born in the underarm era and was prominent throughout roundarm. Although amateur teams were generally weak and some form of handicapping was often necessary, it was always regarded as an important fixture.

In 1864, after overarm was legalised, it became a first class fixture, especially so following the emergence of W. G. Grace, and it thrived as the epitome of cricket's "Golden Age" until 1914. In the inter-war period, the differences in social class began to be challenged and became less pronounced. The differences in playing class became extremely pronounced, as county cricket was dominated by the professionals of the four northern clubs.

After the Second World War, social change swept the country, with the concepts of amateurism and selection of teams based on social class being seen as anachronistic. MCC tried to avoid the inevitable for as long as it could, but the last Gentlemen v Players match before amateurism was abolished was played at the North Marine Road Ground, Scarboroughon 8–11 September 1962.

The fixture was a three-day match on all but a handful of occasions throughout its history. The most frequently used venue was Lord's, but there were several others, notably The Oval and Scarborough.

The same format of amateurs playing professionals was used in other fixtures – for example, Gentlemen of the North v Players of the North in 1877 and 1880 – but these matches became less common towards the end of the 19th century, and the last such game was Gentlemen of the South v Players of the South in 1920. Afterwards, Gentlemen v Players itself was the only fixture in which amateurs opposed professionals.

== Background ==
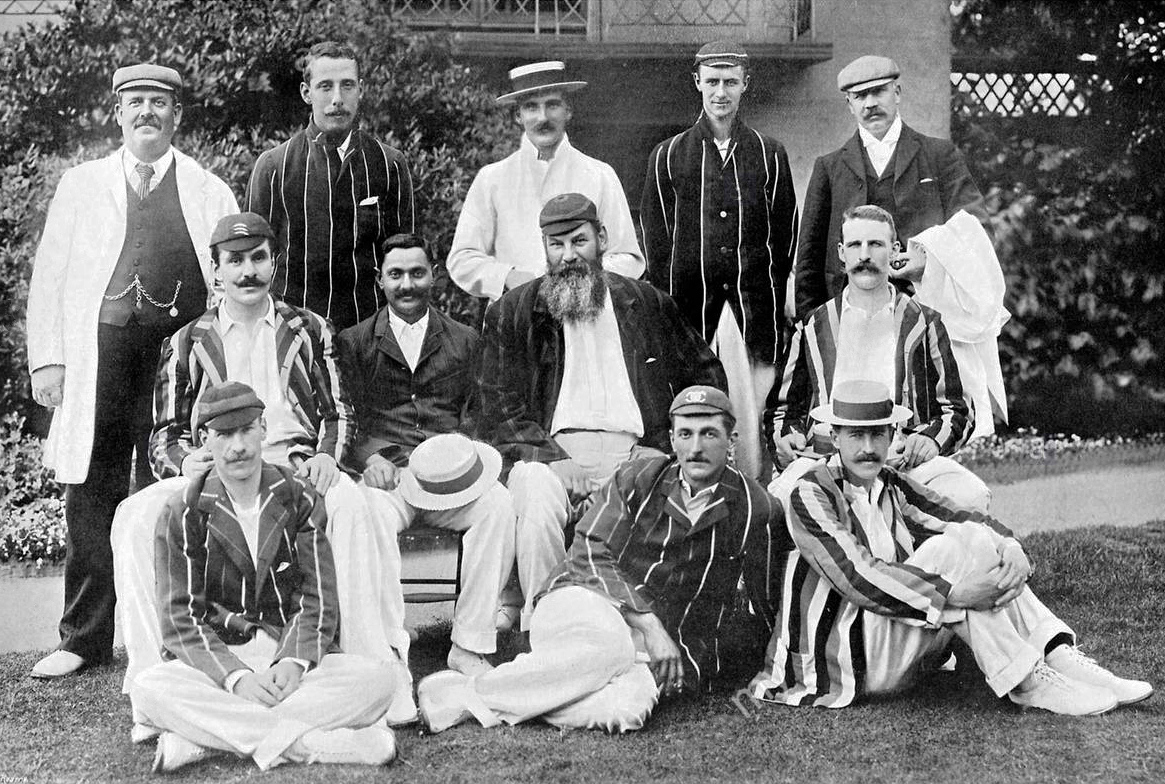
The Gentlemen team at Lord's, 1899. Back row (l–r): Mordecai Sherwin (umpire), Bill Bradley, Archie MacLaren, Charlie Townsend, William West. Middle row (l–r): Gregor MacGregor, K. S. Ranjitsinhji, W. G. Grace (captain), Robert Poore. Front row (l–r): F. S. Jackson, C. B. Fry, Digby Jephson. Not in picture: Jack Mason.

In the introduction to his history of the fixture, Pelham Warner calls it "the most time-honoured of all representative matches" and the "standard" match in English domestic cricket. Warner played for the Gentlemen 24 times between 1897 and 1919.

The fixture often confirmed the commonly held view of an imbalance between amateur and professional: amateurs tended to be batsmen first and foremost, hence there were few good amateur bowlers, while the Players could nearly always field a strong bowling side. The match was played over three days on all but a handful of occasions throughout its history. The most frequent venue for the match was Lord's, but a number of other grounds were used, notably The Oval and Scarborough: it was at Scarborough that the last Gentlemen v Players game was played in September 1962.

The same format of amateurs playing professionals was used in a number of other fixtures (for example, "Gentlemen of Nottinghamshire v Players of Nottinghamshire"), but these matches became less common after the beginning of the 20th century, with the last such game being "Gentlemen of the South v Players of the South" in 1920. Afterwards, all Gentlemen v Players matches were between teams known simply by those names.

== First matches ==
The inaugural fixture was advertised in The Morning Post on Monday, 7 July 1806, as a "Grand Match" to be played at Lord's "THIS DAY ... and the following day, between Nine Gentlemen with Wells and Lambert, against Eleven of England, for 1000 Guineas a side". The expected teams were listed as "PLAYERS" under the titles of "Gentlemen" and "England". The Gentlemen team was pre-announced as Beauclerk, Richard Beckett, Edward Bligh, George Leycester, John Pontifex, T. A. Smith, Arthur Upton, Charles Warren and someone called "Hambleton" as well as the two professionals John Wells and William Lambert. "Hambleton" should have been spelled "Hambledon" because the player concerned was John Nyren. There were two changes to the team – John Wells did not take part in the match and was replaced as a given man by Billy Beldham from the professional team. Richard Beckett, the British Army officer from Leeds who was killed at Talavera in 1809, was unavailable. He was replaced by John Willes. The all-professional England team was pre-announced as Beldham, John Bennett, Andrew Freemantle, John Hammond, J. Hampton, Tom Howard, John Pointer, Robert Robinson, Jack Small, John Sparks and Tom Walker. There were three changes as Beldham, Pointer and Sparks were replaced by William Ayling, Henry Bentley and William Fennex.

7–9 July 1806

England	v	Gentlemen
69; J. Hampton 18; W. Beldham 1w and 2ct		195; W. Lambert 57, T. A. Smith 48; T. C. Howard 1w and 1ct
112; T. Walker 24; A. P. Upton 5ct

Gentlemen won by an innings and 14 runs
Lord's Old Ground, Marylebone, north London

- No bowling details were recorded except when a batsman was bowled.

Arthur Upton, who was not a wicket-keeper, held five catches in the second innings; the current world record is seven. Upton caught six in the whole match. The professionals were weakened by the loss of Beldham, Lambert, Sparks and Wells. The scorecard suggests a good third wicket partnership between Lambert and T. A. Smith for the Gentlemen but there are no details except their individual scores.

The Morning Post carried an advertisement for the second match on Friday, 18 July 1806. This announced a "Grand Match" to be played at Lord's the following Monday and Tuesday "between Ten Gentlemen and Lambert against Eleven of all England, for 1000 Guineas a side". As for the first match, the expected teams were listed as "PLAYERS" under the titles of "Gentlemen" and "England". Again, neither team played as advertised. Scheduled for 21–22 July, the match began on the Monday but the second day's play was delayed until Friday, 25 July. The Gentlemen retained Lambert from the first match, while Beldham played for England. The young E. H. Budd took Beldham's place and Thomas Burgoyne was brought in to replace Warren, who was unavailable. England was strengthened by the return of Beldham, Sparks and Wells who replaced Bentley, Fennex and Hampton.

21 and 25 July 1806

Gentlemen	v	England
96; F. Beauclerk 58; T. C. Howard 4w		65; T. Walker 18; W. Lambert 4w and 1ct
132; W. Lambert 43, F. Beauclerk 38; J. Wells 2w		81; J. Sparks 27, A. Freemantle 26; J. Willes 1w and 1ct

Gentlemen won 82 runs
Lord's Old Ground, Marylebone, north London

- No bowling details were recorded except when a batsman was bowled.

A curiosity of these matches is that they featured the veteran professional Tom Walker and the rookie amateur John Willes: these two players were both credited with devising the roundarm style of bowling, but there is no evidence to suggest they used roundarm in 1806.

Described by H. S. Altham as the "most famous of all domestic matches", the fixture disappeared until 1819. Altham says he does not know why, but the Napoleonic War was one factor as cricket went into decline until after Waterloo in 1815.

== Revival ==
The fixture was revived in 1819 with a match played 7–9 July. The amateurs agreed to play the professionals on equal terms, but lost by six wickets. The professionals were called the Players this time, not England as in 1806, and the name stuck. In the Morning Post on 6 July, the match was announced as "Eleven Gentlemen of England against Lord Strathavon with Ten Players of England". The expected teams were then listed under the titles of "England" and "Players". Strathavon was the sponsor of the Players and captained the team. Arthur Haygarth dismisses him as a liability but in fact he scored 15 runs in the match and only two of his team-mates, Thomas Beagley and James Sherman, scored appreciably more. There was just one run between the teams on first innings, but the Gentlemen collapsed in the second against the bowling of Tom Howard and John Sherman to be bowled out for 60. This match was held at the "new" Lord's ground, the present one, which had opened in 1814. The fourth match was played at Lord's in June 1820, and the Gentlemen, now with star bowler Howard as a given man, won by 70 runs.

The fifth match earned notoriety: it was scheduled to be played at Lord's from 23 to 25 July 1821 but ended on the second day after the Gentlemen conceded defeat. Batting first, they were quickly dismissed for 60 and then had to spend a long time in the field through most of the first and second days while the Players steadily built a big lead. At 270 for six, the Gentlemen gave up and walked off the field. Thomas Beagley scored 113*, the first century in the series. Billed as the "Coronation Match" because it celebrated the accession of the unpopular George IV, it was described by Derek Birley as "a suitably murky affair".

== Odds on ==
After the 1821 match, the fixture struggled for many years to regain credibility. Nine of the fourteen matches played from 1824 to 1837 were played at odds: for instance, in the 1836 match, the Gentlemen had eighteen men, and in the 1827 matches, seventeen men. In addition, the 1831 match was arranged as eleven-a-side, but the Players had only nine men appear, while in 1832, the Gentlemen defended an undersized wicket of 22 by 6 inches, and in 1837 – in what became known as the "Barn Door Match" – the Players defended an oversized wicket of four stumps measuring 36 by 12 inches.

The tide turned somewhat in the 1840s, when Alfred Mynn and Nicholas Felix were playing for the amateurs: in nine equal terms matches from 1842 to 1849, the Gentlemen won five against three for the Players and one drawn. Once that run of success ended, the Gentlemen lost 23 of the next 25 games up to July 1865 (with a win in 1853 and a draw in 1862).

== "Halcyon days of amateur cricket" ==
According to Harry Altham, the period from about 1860 into the 1880s were the "halcyon days of amateur cricket". This refers in part to the success of cricketers who came through the public schools and universities of the period, but in the main to the achievements of Gentlemen teams who, between 1865 and 1881, won 27 matches against the Players whilst losing only five (seven were drawn).

At its height, from 1865 until 1914, the fixture was prestigious though, in terms of quality, it fell far short of Test matches and did not match the rival North v. South fixture. Until 1865, the Gentlemen teams were often very weak compared to the professional Players, and on occasion the fixture had to be arranged on an odds basis (so that the Players eleven took on a greater number of Gentlemen), with different-sized wickets, or with Players being loaned to the Gentlemen.

The Gentlemen becoming competitive coincided with the career of W. G. Grace, whose performances were so outstanding that the Gentlemen could enjoy some long-awaited success (their previous win prior to Grace's career had come in 1853).

== 1919–1946 ==
The prestige of the fixture was in decline through the inter-war years, partly due to social change after the First World War and then during the Great Depression. The main reason was that there was much greater interest in Test cricket and the County Championship. As in the fixture's first half-century, the Gentlemen were not a match for the Players, especially in bowling and fielding, but also in batting as the Players could call on the likes of Jack Hobbs and Herbert Sutcliffe.

== Post-war social change ==
Social change after the Second World War led to a reaction against the concept of amateurism in English cricket.

The fixture's last season was 1962 when there were two matches. The first was played 18–20 July at Lord's. The Players were captained by Fred Trueman and the Gentlemen by England captain Ted Dexter. The match was halted by rain to end in a draw with the Players looking certain to win. The final edition of the fixture was played on 8, 10 and 11 September 1962 at the North Marine Road Ground, Scarborough. The Players were again captained by Trueman and the Gentlemen by Mike Smith, standing in for Dexter who was ill.

=== Final match, Scarborough Festival, 1962 ===
8–11 September 1962

Gentlemen	v	Players
328; G. W. Richardson 68; R. I. Jefferson 68; G. A. R. Lock 4/87		337; K. F. Barrington 100; R. I. Jefferson 4/104
217; R. C. White 95; F. S. Trueman 4/11		212/3; R. A. Gale 88; C. D. Drybrough 1/38

Players won by 7 wickets
North Marine Road Ground, Scarborough
Umpires: J. S. Buller, W. E. Phillipson

- Toss not known.
- To win the match, the Players needed to score 209 in just over two hours. As the winning runs were scored, it began to rain.
- In the Gentlemen's second innings, Fred Trueman had a spell in which he took three wickets for only two runs.
  This was not planned to be the final match in the series: that was confirmed on 31 January 1963 (see below) when the MCC abolished amateurism.

== MCC ruling and aftermath ==
On 31 January 1963, the distinction between amateur and professional players was abolished by the MCC. All cricketers became nominally professional, or effectively Players. With this decision, the Gentlemen, and the raison d'etre for the Gentlemen v Players fixture, ceased to exist, and the series ended.

Charles Williams has described several reports on the subject which were submitted to MCC by its Amateur Status Standing Committee (ASSC), with the MCC committee unanimously agreeing to abolish amateurism. Williams also says while a substitute fixture was sought, it was decided not to pursue this, as the new Gillette Cup limited-overs competition was beginning in 1963.

There were contrasting views about the end of amateurism and the passing of Gentlemen v Players: some traditionalists like E. W. Swanton and the editor of Wisden Cricketers' Almanack lamented the passing of an era, but noted that social change had rendered the concept an anachronism.

Fred Trueman, who captained the last-ever Players team, spoke for many when he described amateurism as a "ludicrous business" that was "thankfully abolished": he also said he was glad there would be "no more fancy caps", having previously been "all for the abolition of amateurs" and their "afforded privileges".

=== 2010 match ===
On 15 August 2010, the concept was revived for the first time in 48 years when a Twenty20 match was played at Wormsley Park. The Gentlemen were represented by a selection of under-19 cricketers from Blackheath Cricket Club and state schools in South East London and the Tower Hamlets area. The Players were a team representing the Professional Cricketers Association Masters, captained by Rob Key. After losing the toss and being sent in, the Players finished on 127/8, with the Gentlemen scoring 128/5 to win by five wickets off the final ball.

== Records ==
=== Results ===
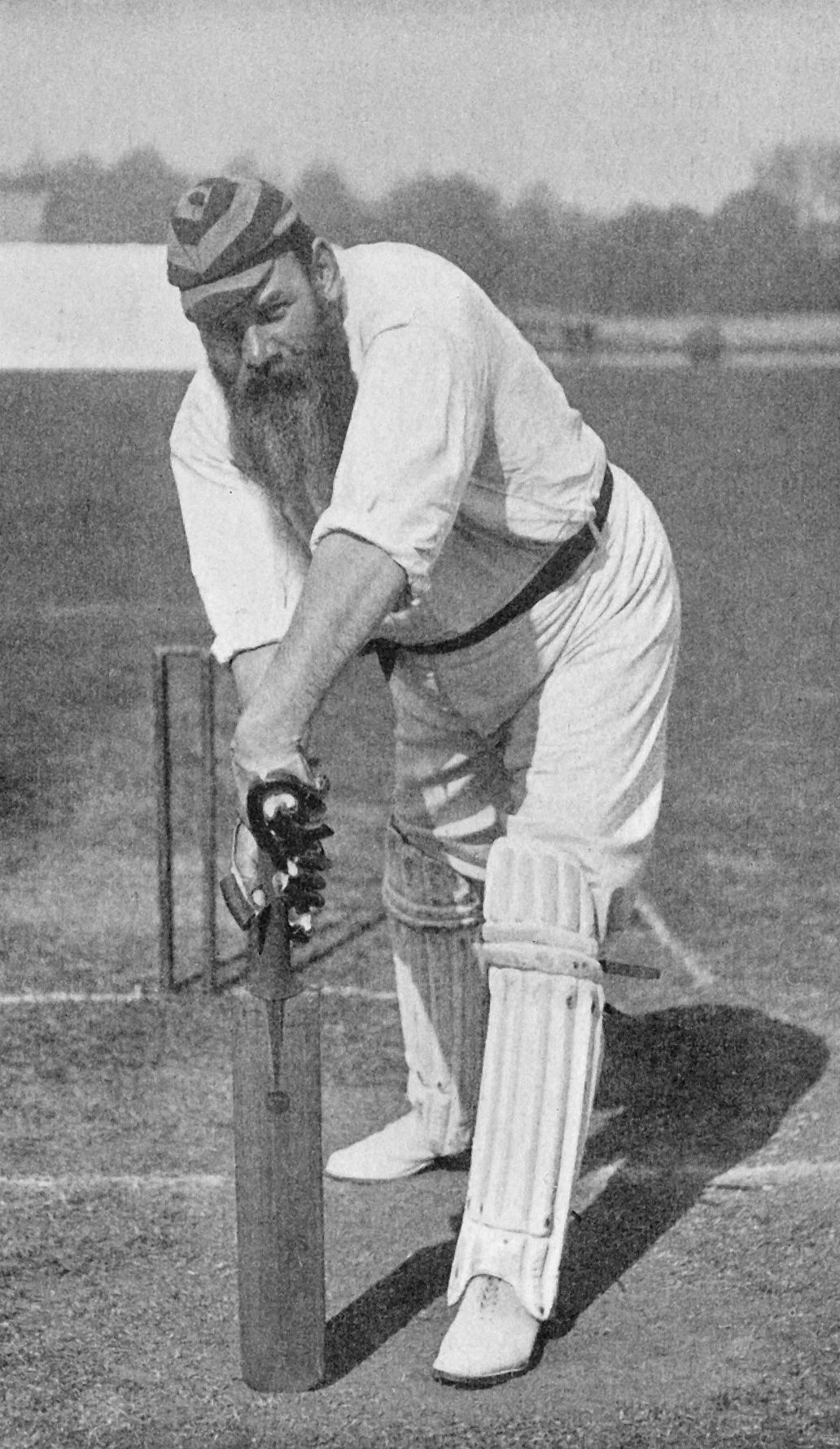
W. G. Grace demonstrating forward defence

In all, 274 matches were played over 133 years (in 1806, 1819–1825, 1827, 1829–1914, 1919–1939 and 1946–1962). The Gentlemen won 68 matches and the Players won 125, with 80 matches being drawn, and the first match of 1883 ended in a tie.

=== Largest margins of victory ===
By an innings
Players, innings and 305 runs: The Oval, 1934
Players, innings and 231 runs: Lord's, 1924
Players, innings and 181 runs: Lord's, 1860
Players, innings and 140 runs: Hastings, 1891
Players, innings and 128 runs: Lord's, 1946
Gentlemen record was innings and 126 runs: The Oval, 1879

By runs
Players, 345 runs: Lord's, 1823
Players, 285 runs: Lord's, 1858
Gentlemen, 262 runs, Lord's, 1875
Players, 241 runs: The Oval, 1914
Players, 206 runs, Lord's, 1878

By wickets
ten wickets: seven instances (all Players)
Gentlemen record was nine wickets: The Oval, 1872, and Prince's Cricket Ground, 1877

=== Smallest margins of victory ===
By runs
Tied match at The Oval, 1883
Players, one run: Hove, 1881
Players, two runs: Lord's, 1952
Gentlemen, four runs: Lord's, 1870
Gentlemen, five runs: Lord's, 1888

By wickets
one wicket: five instances (all Gentlemen)
Players record was two wickets: Lord's, 1856, Lord's, 1874, Lord's, 1900 and Scarborough, 1955

=== Highest team totals ===
Players, 651/7 dec: The Oval, 1934
Players, 608: The Oval, 1921
Players, 579: Lord's, 1926
Gentlemen, 578: The Oval, 1904
Gentlemen, 542: Lord's, 1926

=== Lowest team totals ===
Players, 24: Lord's, 1829 (first innings)
Gentlemen, 31: Lord's, 1848 (Gentlemen won the match)
Gentlemen, 35: Lord's, 3 July 1837
Gentlemen, 36: Lord's, 1831 (one man absent hurt)
Players, 37: Lord's, 1829 (second innings)

=== Highest individual innings ===
266*: Jack Hobbs, Players, Scarborough, 1925
247: Bobby Abel, Players, The Oval, 1901
241: Len Hutton, Players, Scarborough, 1953
232*: C. B. Fry, Gentlemen, Lord's, 1903
217: W. G. Grace, Gentlemen, Hove, 1871

=== Hundred in each innings of a match ===
102* & 136: R. E. Foster, Gentlemen, Lord's, 1900
104 & 109*: John King, Players, Lord's, 1904
125 & 103*: K. S. Duleepsinhji, Gentlemen, Lord's, 1930

=== Nine or more wickets in an innings ===
10–37: Alec Kennedy, Players, The Oval, 1927
10–90: Arthur Fielder, Players, Lord's, 1906
10–?: F. W. Lillywhite, Players, Lord's, 17 July 1837 (second innings; Gentlemen had 16 men)
9–46: John Stephenson, Gentlemen, Lord's, 1936
9–82: David Buchanan, Gentlemen, The Oval, 1868
9–85: Cec Parkin, Players, The Oval, 1920
9–105: Johnny Douglas, Gentlemen, Lord's, 1914
9–?: F. W. Lillywhite, Lord's, 3 July 1837

=== Thirteen or more wickets in a match ===
18–?: F. W. Lillywhite, Players, Lord's, 17 July 1837 (Gentlemen had 16 men)
14–221: Arthur Fielder, Players, Lord's, 1906
14–?: F. W. Lillywhite, Players, Lord's, 1829
13–141: Tom Richardson, Players, Hastings, 1897
13–144: Tich Freeman, Players, Lord's, 1929
13–?: F. W. Lillywhite, Players, Lord's, 1835
13–?: F. W. Lillywhite, Players, Lord's, 3 July 1837
13–?: James Cobbett, Players, Lord's, 1836 (Gentlemen had 18 men)

=== Five catches in an innings ===
Alfred Lyttelton, Gentlemen, The Oval, 1877
A. J. Webbe, Gentlemen, Lord's, 1877
Len Hutton, Players, Lord's, 1952

=== Four stumpings in an innings ===
E. H. Budd, Gentlemen, Lord's, 1819
William Slater, Players, Lord's, 1824 (Gentlemen had 14 men)

== See also ==
- Professional and amateur status in first-class cricket
- List of Gentlemen v Players matches
- Variations in published cricket statistics
- Sheriff of London Charity Shield, amateur v professional football match, 1898–1907

== Bibliography ==
- Altham, H. S. (1962). A History of Cricket, Volume 1 (to 1914). London: George Allen & Unwin. ASIN B0014QE7HQ.
- Birley, Derek (1999). A Social History of English Cricket. London: Aurum Press Ltd. ISBN 978-18-54107-10-7.
- Bowen, Rowland (1970). Cricket: A History of its Growth and Development. London: Eyre & Spottiswoode. ISBN 978-04-13278-60-9.
- Haygarth, Arthur (1996) [1862]. Scores & Biographies, Volume 1 (1744–1826). Kennington: Frederick Lillywhite. ISBN 978-19-00592-23-9.
- Trueman, Fred (2004). As It Was. London: Macmillan. ISBN 978-03-30427-05-0.
- Warner, Pelham (1950). Gentlemen v. Players, 1806–1949. London: Harrap. ASIN B0000CHNKN.
- Williams, Charles (2012). Gentlemen & Players: The Death of Amateurism in Cricket. London: Weidenfeld & Nicolson. ISBN 978-07-53829-27-1.
