= John Pointer =

John Pointer may refer to:

- John Pointer (cricketer) (1782–1815), English cricketer
- John Pointer (antiquary) (1668–1754), English cleric and antiquary
- John Pointer (American football) (born 1958), American football player
