= Rickmansworth Cricket Club =

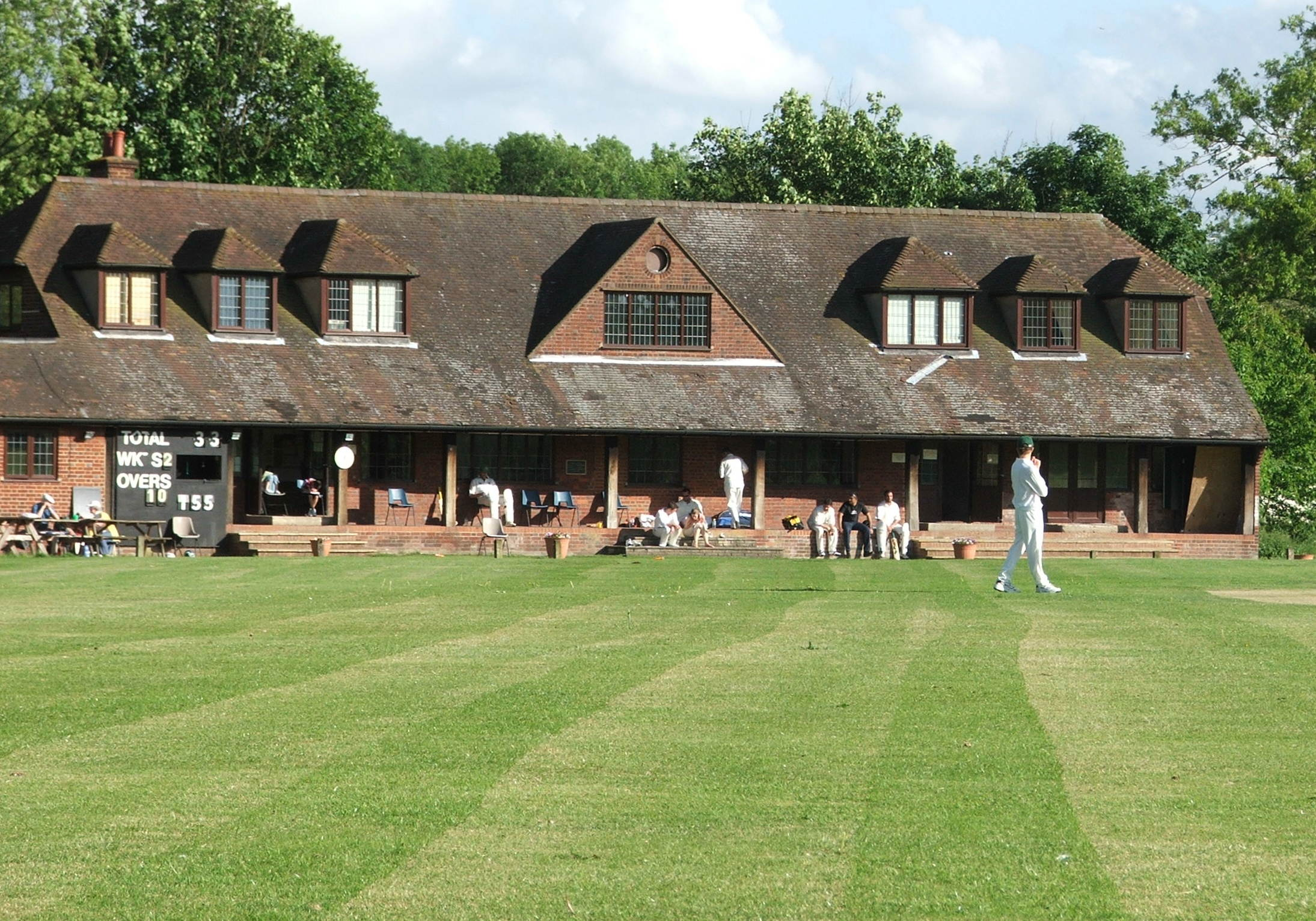
Rickmansworth Cricket Club

Rickmansworth Cricket Club is one of the oldest cricket clubs in England. The badge denotes a founding date of 1787, however there are records of games prior to this, one in particular between the club and Pinner in 1760.

It is known there was a match between Rickmansworth and Pinner in 1790 in which 7 Rickmansworth Batsmen were run out. The local Paper, the Watford Observer, noted that this was due, in no small part, to 'an excess of Beef and Beer prior to the match'.

In the early days the club was based at the south end of Rickmansworth at the bottom of Batchworth Hill. In 1803, Rickmansworth hosted its only 1st class game to date. HC Woolridge's XI v WR Capel's XI. Clifford's Park, Rickmansworth. 26 August 1803. The Clifford's Park ground was situated just a few hundred yards from the current ground and is now part of the Girls Masonic School. The primary player in the game was Lord Frederick Beauclerk, one of the best single-wicket cricketers of his time. His under-arm bowling was very slow, but extremely accurate - and he could get the ball to rise abruptly off a length. Beauclerk was the second president of the MCC in 1826. The Captain of one team was William Capel

In the middle of the 19th century, the club moved to its present ground at Park Road and functioned from a wooden pavilion which provided accommodation only for serving refreshments and for teams to change their attire. A score book dated 1881–1883, has been preserved, and in this score book there are details of a match with an England team (see below). The overs were 4 ball overs at the time, and teams rarely scored more than 100 and often batted twice in a day.

From this time onwards Rickmansworth were one of the top club sides in the South of England. In 1881 they played an England XI and won by 9 wickets, despite the England team containing Billy Midwinter, famous as being the only player to represent both England and Australia in Test matches.

In 1882 Rickmansworth again hosted an All England team of professional players preparing to face the touring Australians 9 days later. Rickmansworth (fielding 18 players against the England Eleven) were defeated by 128 runs, but the England team went on to lose the most famous of matches, the original ‘Ashes’, at the Oval just over a week later. The same Ashes which are so keenly contested to this day.

A local guide circulated in Rickmansworth about 1912 contained an article by Mr Tom Bevan, the headmaster of the Boys Elementary School from about 1890, giving details of some of his researches at Lords. In this article it is stated that the Rickmansworth Club played an England team at the Lords ground as far back as 1807, just 20 years after the founding of the MCC

Originally part of the Rickmansworth House Estate, the cricket ground was subsequently the property of Salters Brewery, which was situated on both sides of the High Street where the Joan of Arc Roman Catholic School now stands. Access to the field was by a road where the Roman Catholic Church now stands and continuing on the left of the old Malt House, now known as St Augustine's Hall.

The old wooden pavilion, situated where the Cricket nets are now, had a small lawn in front of it, enclosed by an iron fence and only males were allowed to enter.

Cricket play was halted during the 1914-1918 War and then play resumed in 1919. In early 1920 Salters Brewery was taken over by one of the large Brewery firms, and the threat of the Club losing the ground it had used for such a long time was very real. It was then that Mr Francis William Reckitt, who was a grandson of the founders of the Reckitt & Sons business, an artist, who had lived in the town since 1904, stepped in and bought the whole property. He had a modern club house erected and a hockey field laid out on the top part of the fields, replacing the bowling greens, and hard and grass lawn tennis courts alredy constructed. The hard courts were where the car park is today and you can still see the brick built surrounds.

The club thus provided facilities for cricket, bowls, lawn tennis and hockey and when the club house was officially opened on 2 February 1924, it then assumed the title of the Rickmansworth Cricket and Sports Club. William Reckitt set the property and grounds in Trust providing Sport was always played on the grounds.

A cricket team functioned throughout the Second World War of 1939-1945 and the cricket field was kept properly cut and the actual playing pitch of the hockey field was not allowed to grow wild. This was only possible because of an arrangement with Hertfordshire County Council giving them sole use of the greater part of the club house as a children's nursery. The financial arrangements made with the County Council during the war, and compensation when the war was ended enabled the club to pay its way and accumulate a small surplus.

Since the War the club started a slow but steady decline from being a Premier County side to, by the 1970s, a club in a downward spiral. In the early 1980s the club house was altered to accommodate an upstairs changing room and the downstairs kitchen and garden, which had existed for the use of the club professional from the 1930s to the 1960s, was removed. By 1985 the club languished in the bottom division in Hertfordshire Cricket and the club was struggling to put out 1 team on each day.

In the 1990s through attracting new players, the club won the 3rd Division and 2nd Division of the Saracens Herts Cricket League in successive years. The 2nd team were promoted also in 1995 and 1998. When the Saracens Herts Premier Cricket League reorganised the Divisions, Rickmansworth were in Division 6 but have since risen to Division 2 for the 2027 season. The 1st team were Division 3 Champions in 2026 under the captaincy of Harvey Blackwell. The 2nd XI are now in Division 5B, whilst there are 3 other league teams on a Saturday, an occasional 6th XI and a flourishing Sunday team. In 2026 the Sunday 1st XI were also Champions of Division 4 of the Chess Valley League.

In the last 20 years the club has become a flourishing cornerstone of the community offering League and friendly cricket for boys, girls, women and men. There is a Youth Cricket Section, for both boys and girls and a number of the youngsters now represent the District, Area and County in Cricket. In 2026 the club ran a womens team for the first time in it's history. It now has 7 Men's teams, a Ladies team, 9 boys teams and 6 girls teams, making it one of the largest clubs in Hertfordshire on participation.
