= Tornado Cars =

Tornado Typhoon Sports

Overview
- Manufacturer: Tornado Cars Ltd
- Production: 1957–62

Body and chassis
- Body style: 2-door convertible
- Layout: Front engine with rear-wheel drive

Powertrain
- Engine: 933 cc (56.9 cu in) sidevalve I4; 1,172 cubic centimetres (71.5 cu in) sidevalve
- Transmission: 3-speed manual

Dimensions
- Wheelbase: 87 in (2,210 mm) or 97 in (2,464 mm)

Tornado Cars Ltd was founded in 1957 by Bill Woodhouse and Tony Bullen based in Mill End, Rickmansworth, Hertfordshire, England.

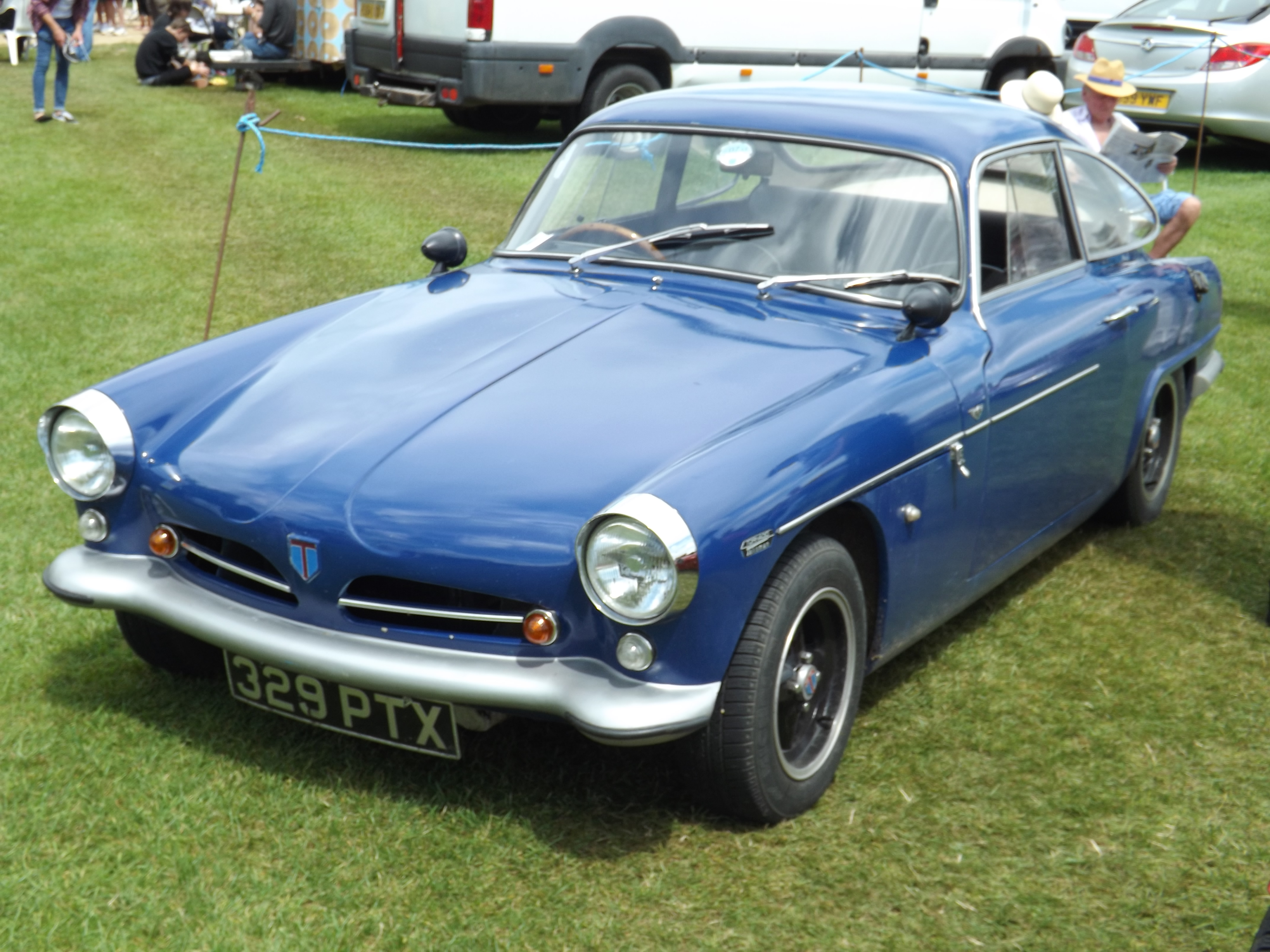
1962 Tornado Talisman

The first model was the Typhoon Sports, available either as a body for fitting to Ford 8/10 chassis (following a then current market trend for "specials" based on these mechanical components) or with a Tornado designed and manufactured chassis to which a range of engines and transmissions could be fitted. About 400 Typhoons of all variants are believed to have been produced through to 1962.

A similarly styled Tempest model featuring a Ford Anglia 105E engine and independent wishbone front suspension and live back axle. This was introduced around 1960–61, but only around 15 were produced. A Competition Tempest was also produced using the same front suspension, but with a highly tuned formula junior engine with twin 38 DCOEs. Fitted with a close-ratio gearbox and having an independent rear axle. Also from a Formula Junior with in board alfin drums. A Tornado Thunderbolt was also produced using a Triumph TR3 engine and a stronger chassis and suspension. Only one was built. This car survives today alongside the Competition Tempest, with the original constructor.

In 1962, the company introduced the Talisman 2+2 coupe carrying an attractively styled fibreglass body on a more sophisticated tubular steel chassis with Ford 1,340 cc or 1,500 cc engines in various states of tune. This model was available either in component form or factory finished and was praised for having lively performance combined with good ride and handling characteristics, and a high standard of finish. Cash-flow problems forced the company into liquidation in 1964 after just approx. 186 Talismans had been made.

The company was bought in 1963 by John Rex Glyn Bekaert, Jaguar racing driver and friend of Lofty England (Jaguar). The company was renamed Tornado Cars (1963) Ltd. and the first project was the build of the Talisman V8. This car was based on the shortened and strengthened chassis of a Daimler SP250. Engine, gearbox and even suspension were reused from the Daimler and the Talisman body put on top. The car was presented to Jaguar Ltd. when finished and even taken into consideration by them, codenamed "Jaguar Intercity Car". Handling and performance were found to be brilliant and just two weeks after completion the car had won the Rallye de la Route in France when Pat Moss only made it to 6th place.

== See also ==
- List of car manufacturers of the United Kingdom
