= John Pontifex =

John Pontifex may refer to:

- John Pontifex (cricketer, born 1796)
- John Pontifex (cricketer, born 1771)
