= Jack Small =

English cricketer

John Small (7 October 1765 – 21 January 1836) was an English cricketer who played for the Hambledon Club. He is also associated with Hampshire, Marylebone Cricket Club, Kent and Surrey.

Jack Small made his debut in 1784, his career continuing until 1811. He was noted as "a sound batsman" but should not be compared with his father John Small senior, who was still playing when Jack started.

Small played for the Players in the inaugural and second Gentlemen v Players matches in 1806.

He and John Nyren were close friends and Nyren always refers to Small junior as Jack Small. His younger brother, Eli Small, played for Hampshire.

== Bibliography ==
- H S Altham, A History of Cricket, Volume 1 (to 1914), George Allen & Unwin, 1962
- Derek Birley, A Social History of English Cricket, Aurum, 1999
- Arthur Haygarth, Scores & Biographies, Volume 1 (1744–1826), Lillywhite, 1862
- Ashley Mote, John Nyren's "The Cricketers of my Time", Robson, 1998
- Ashley Mote, The Glory Days of Cricket, Robson, 1997
