= John Pontifex (cricketer, born 1771) =

English cricketer (1771–1841)

John Pontifex (1 July 1771 – 1 September 1841) was an English amateur cricketer who made 19 appearances in historically important matches from 1796 to 1810. (Note: Any match listed in the ACS' Important Match Guide (1981) is historically important, and therefore of the highest standard, whether or not a scorecard might exist. The same applies to numerous matches discovered by researchers since 1981. For further information, see First-class cricket.) He was a member of the Marylebone Cricket Club (MCC), and played for the Gentlemen in the first two Gentlemen v Players matches in 1806.

== Matches ==
Pontifex played in all of these nineteen games, as confirmed by the book source cited on each line. Fifteen were played at Lord's Old Ground, and the other four as shown at other venues.

The matches are historically important, and are listed as such in the ACS Important Matches guide:

date	match details
12 August 1796	Thursday Club v Montpelier & Kennington Clubs
26 August 1796	Montpelier and Kennington Clubs v Thursday Club at Aram's New Ground
12 June 1797	Montpelier v Marylebone Cricket Club at Aram's New Ground
26 June 1797	Marylebone Cricket Club v Montpelier
28 May 1798	Marylebone Cricket Club v Montpelier
27 June 1799	Brentford & Richmond v Montpelier at Richmond Green
26 August 1803	H. C. Woolridge's XI v W. R. Capel's XI at Clifford's Park, Rickmansworth
18 June 1804	Marylebone Cricket Club v England
2 July 1804	Marylebone Cricket Club v England
7 July 1806	Gentlemen v Players
21 July 1806	Gentlemen v Players
18 May 1807	Marylebone Cricket Club v Middlesex
25 May 1807	England v Hampshire
23 May 1808	Marylebone Cricket Club v Middlesex
30 May 1808	Marylebone Cricket Club v Middlesex
1 June 1809	Marylebone Cricket Club v England
17 July 1809	England v 'Four First Chosen with Seven Others'
20 Sept 1809	Lord F. Beauclerk's XI v F. C. Ladbroke's XI
29 May 1810	Lord F. Beauclerk's XI v E. Bligh's XI

== Bibliography ==
- ACS (1981). A Guide to Important Cricket Matches Played in the British Isles 1709–1863. Nottingham: ACS. OCLC 85045528.
- Buckley, G. B. (1937). Fresh Light on pre-Victorian Cricket. Birmingham: Cotterell & Co. OCLC 23469107.
- Haygarth, Arthur (1996) [1862]. Scores & Biographies, Volume 1 (1744–1826). Kennington: Frederick Lillywhite. ISBN 978-19-00592-23-9.
