= Old Town Hall, Rickmansworth =

Events venue in Rickmansworth, Hertfordshire, England

Old Town Hall
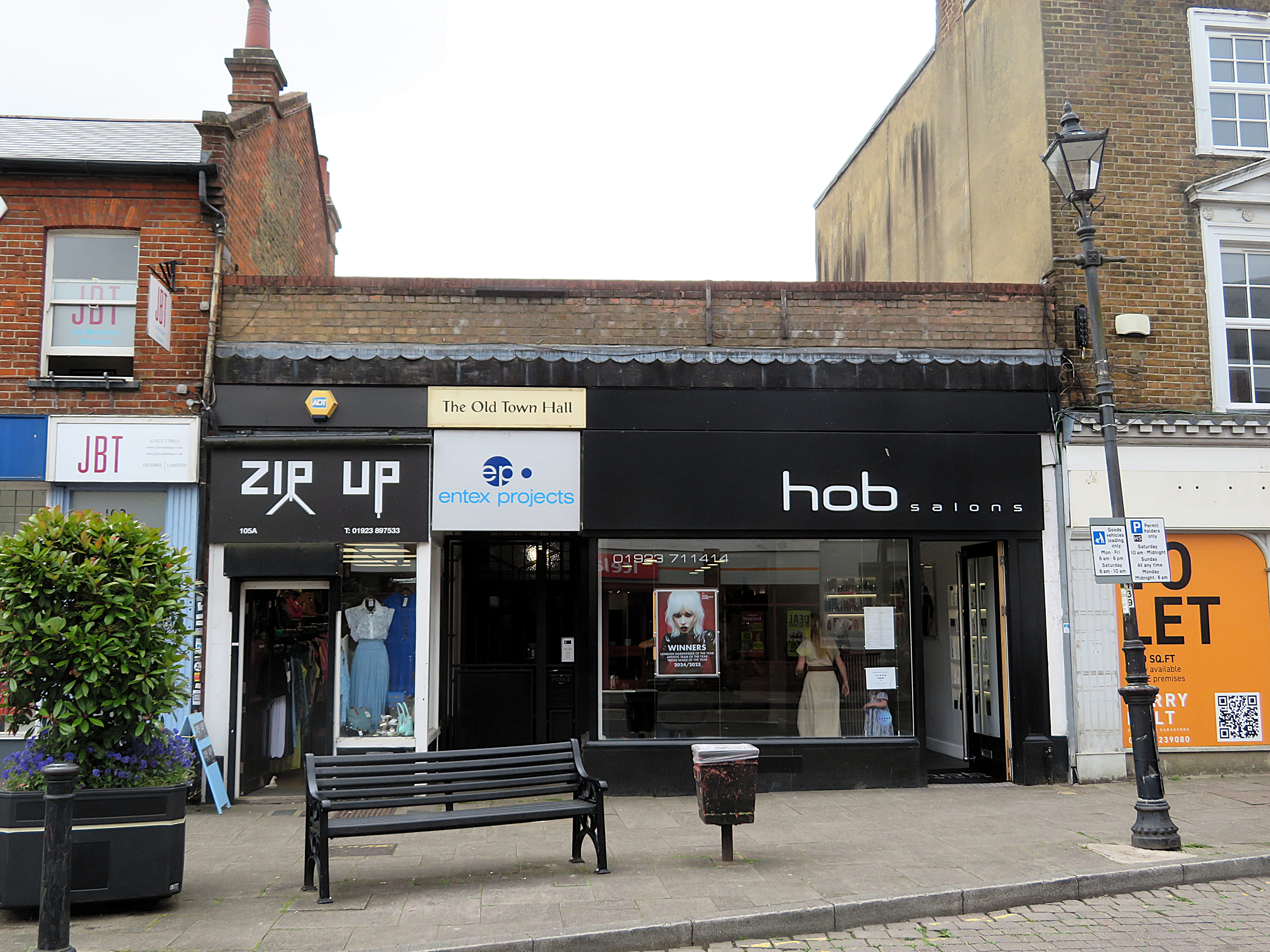
- Old Town Hall: Remains of building, now converted into shops

- Shown in Hertfordshire
- 51.6387°N 0.4694°W
- Location: High Street, Rickmansworth

History
- Built: 1869

Site notes
- Architect: Arthur Allum
- Architectural style: Gothic Revival style

The Old Town Hall was a municipal building in the High Street in Rickmansworth, a town in Hertfordshire, in England. The upper floors have been demolished and the ground floor is now in retail use.

== History ==
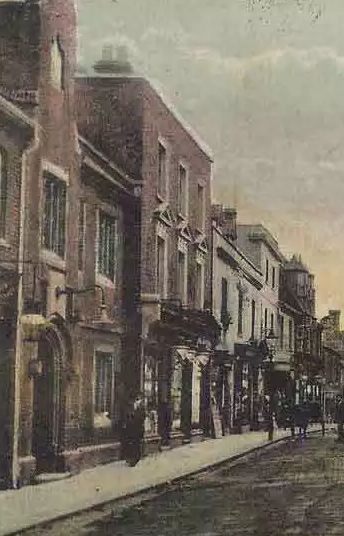
The building, with the arched doorway on the extreme left, in around 1910

In the mid-1860s, a group of local businessmen decided to form a company, known as the Rickmansworth Town Hall Company, to finance and commission a town hall for the town. The site they selected, on the south side of the High Street, was occupied by the old Market Hall, which had become very dilapidated. The site was donated to the directors by the lord of the manor, John Saunders Gilliat, whose residence was at The Cedars in Rickmansworth.

The new building was designed by Arthur Thomas Allom (1829–1895) of Westminster in the Gothic Revival style, built in red brick with Bath stone dressings at a cost of £1,200 and was officially opened in December 1869. The design involved a symmetrical main frontage of two bays facing onto the High Street. The left-hand bay featured an arched doorway with an archivolt, surmounted by a lamp which projected over the pavement. The right-hand bay on the ground floor and both bays on the first floor were fenestrated by casement windows with stone surrounds. There was an additional storey in the left-hand bay at attic level, fenestrated by a small square window and surmounted by a stepped gable with a finial. Internally, the principal room was an assembly hall, which was 56 feet (17 m) long and 27 feet (8.2 m) wide and which featured a hammerbeam roof. It was used for dances, concerts, lectures, and monthly meetings of the Penny Reading Society.

An inquiry was held in February 1896 at the hall, to consider whether to establish an urban district. This proposal went ahead, and the first meeting of Rickmansworth Urban District Council was held at the Town Hall on 16 April 1898. In 1912, the assembly hall was converted into an auditorium to facilitate its use as a cinema known as the Electric Picture Playhouse, with a capacity of 300 people. It was later renamed the Electric Palace, but it closed as a cinema in 1927.

Meanwhile, the urban district council relocated to the former home of William Penn at Basing House, on the north side of the High Street in 1930.

The auditorium behind the old town hall was later demolished, along with the upper part of the town hall facade. The lower part of the facade was altered to create two shop fronts, while a two-storey office block was built on the site of the auditorium behind.
