= Rickmansworth Aquadrome =

Park and nature reserve in Hertfordshire, England

Coordinates: 51.6331°N 0.4785°W

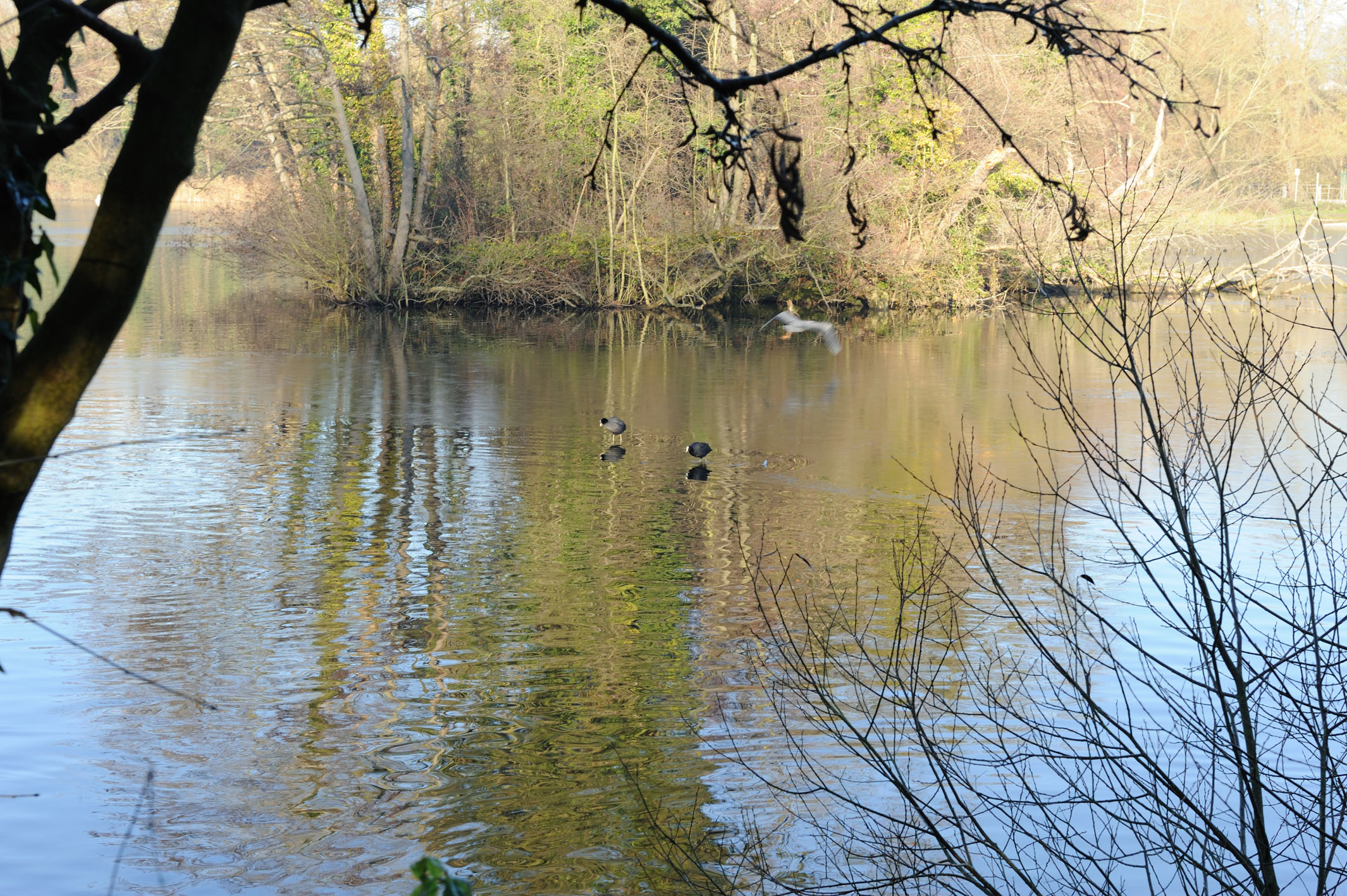
Batchworth Lake

Rickmansworth Aquadrome is a 41-hectare (101-acre) public park and Local Nature Reserve in Rickmansworth in Hertfordshire. It is owned and managed by Three Rivers District Council.

There are two lakes, which were created by the extraction of gravel for the original Wembley Stadium; Batchworth Lake is used for water skiing and Bury Lake is used by Bury Lake Young Mariners for sailing and canoeing. The site has a diverse range of wildlife habitats. It has small copper and gatekeeper butterflies.

The Aquadrome has open grassland; areas of woodland with trees such as oaks and willows; many birds including herons and moorhens; large car park; café and children's play area. Its boundaries are the River Colne to the north, the Grand Union Canal to the east and south and Stocker's Lake nature reserve to the west. In July 2009, it received a Green Flag Award for parks and open spaces which meet high standards.

Vehicular access is from Harefield Road via Frogmoor Lane'.
