= Mill End, Rickmansworth =

Suburb of Rickmansworth, Hertfordshire, England

Coordinates: 51.63671°N 0.49187°W

- Location within Hertfordshire
  - London: 0 mi (0.0 km)The London Borough of Hillingdon is to the S or SE
- District: Three Rivers District
- Shire county: Hertfordshire
- Region: East
- Country: England
- Sovereign state: United Kingdom
- Post town: RICKMANSWORTH
- Postcode district: WD3
- Dialling code: 01923
- Police: Hertfordshire
- Fire: Hertfordshire
- Ambulance: East of England
- UK Parliament: Hertfordshire South West

Mill End is a suburb of Rickmansworth in Hertfordshire, England. Most of it is an unparished area, not being within a civil parish, although part of the built-up area comes under Chorleywood Parish Council. All of Mill End forms part of Three Rivers District and so is administered by Three Rivers District Council and Hertfordshire County Council.

== History ==
Mill End was historically a hamlet in the parish of Rickmansworth. By the 1870s, Mill End had church buildings and so had become a village; it was no longer a hamlet. It contained St. Peter's Church (built in 1874–5) and a Baptist chapel. St Peter's was a small flint building with Bath-stone dressings. The village also had a paper mill, tannery, and brewery.

Mill End was part of the Rickmansworth Urban District from its creation in 1898 until the district was abolished in 1974.

Another notable ancient structure at Mill End was a timber-framed farmhouse called Shepherds Farm, mentioned in a 1294 subsidy roll with a reference to Robert Le Schephard. The subsidy roll of 1534 records the name of Robert Lane. The Lane family farmed there until 1773, when Joseph Lane sold the farm to Joseph Swannell. By 1839 the Thelluson trustees had bought it. They built a new farmhouse and used the original farmhouse as lodgings for single men employed on the farm.

Tornado Cars used to manufacture kit cars at 90 Uxbridge Rd, Mill End. The company sold the cars either factory finished or in component form (in which case the buyer was responsible for assembling the car from the components). The first model was shown to the press in August 1958 and production of cars stopped in 1964. Tornado Cars won the 750 Motor Clubs' Six Hour Handicap Relay Race at Silverstone twice and, at its peak, employed 60 people. The new Fairway Tyre Services building on the site is called "Tornado House" as a tribute.

Most of Mill End is unparished, but the part of it north of Oakfield is in Chorleywood Civil Parish.

== Geography ==
London is just to the south of Mill End (Mill End borders the London Borough of Hillingdon).

== Notable people ==
=== Harry Edwin Curtis ===
Harry Edwin Curtis JP (known as H.E. Curtis) was living in Springwell Lodge (276 Uxbridge Road) Mill End when he died on 8 December 1948. He had been a Hertfordshire County Council alderman and a chairman of Rickmansworth Urban District Council "who worked for the good of Mill End for many years and who had taken great interest in the welfare of old people".

When Springwell Avenue, Mill End was built (in December 1925), Rickmansworth Urban District Council named it after Curtis' home, Springwell Lodge. In 1953 the council named Curtis Close (which contained bungalows for old people) in commemoration of Curtis. These road names were kept in 1972 when their pre-fabricated bungalows and houses were demolished and rebuilt.

=== Job Lane ===
Job Lane (1620–1697) emigrated to America from Shepherds Farm, Mill End, in 1649 (with his brothers James and Edward). He was a carpenter who built bridges and houses in the Boston, Massachusetts area. He also imported goods from England.

In 1664, Lane became the owner of 1,500 acres of land in Billerica in exchange for building a mansion at Norwich, Connecticut for Fitz John Winthrop, the grandson of Governor Winthrop. This land is now one-fifth of Bedford, Massachusetts. Lane also built one of the college buildings in Cambridge, Massachusetts.
