= Eli Small =

English cricketer

Eli Small (born 1767 at Petersfield, Hampshire; died 20 May 1837 at Petersfield]) was an English professional cricketer who made 2 known appearances in important matches from 1788 to 1796. He was a son of John Small and brother of Jack Small.

== Career ==
He was mainly associated with Hampshire.
