= Crystal 23 =

Sailboat class

Development
- Designer: Alan Buchanan
- Location: United Kingdom
- Year: 1961
- Builders: French Brothers; Seamaster Limited; Stebbings & Sons
- Role: Cruiser
- Name: Crystal 23

Boat
- Displacement: 3,000 lb (1,361 kg)
- Draft: 3.50 ft (1.07 m)

Hull
- Type: monohull
- Construction: glassfibre
- LOA: 22.75 ft (6.93 m)
- LWL: 18.17 ft (5.54 m)
- Beam: 7.50 ft (2.29 m)
- Engine: Volvo inboard engine

Hull appendages
- Keel: fin keel
- Ballast: 830 lb (376 kg)
- Rudder: transom-mounted rudder

Rig
- Rig type: Bermuda rig

Sails
- Sailplan: masthead sloop
- Total sail area: 225.00 sq ft (20.903 m^{2})

The Crystal 23 is a British trailerable sailboat that was designed by Alan Buchanan as a cruiser and first built in 1961.

The Crystal 23 was later developed into the Buchanan-designed 1967 Halcyon 23.

== Production ==
The design was built by French Brothers and Seamaster Limited, and were fitted out by Stebbings & Sons in the United Kingdom, starting in 1961, but it is now out of production.

== Design ==
The Crystal 23 is a recreational keelboat, built predominantly of glassfibre, with wood trim. It has a masthead sloop rig, a spooned raked stem, an angled transom, a transom-hung rudder controlled by a tiller and a fixed fin keel with a weighted bulb or optional bilge keels. It displaces 3,000 lb (1,361 kg) and carries 830 lb (376 kg) of iron ballast.

The boat has a draft of 3.50 ft (1.07 m) with the fin keel. It is fitted with a Swedish Volvo inboard engine for docking and maneuvering.

The design has a hull speed of 5.71 kn (10.57 km/h).

== See also ==
- List of sailing boat types
