= Stocker's Lake =

Artificial lake in Hertfordshire, England

Coordinates: 51.630°N 0.488°W

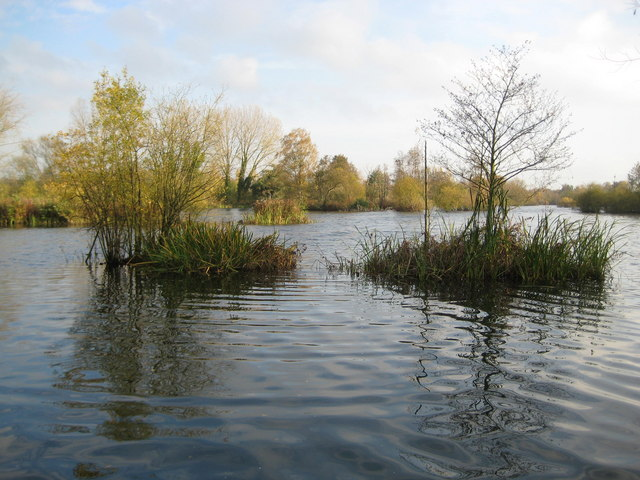
Stocker's Lake

Stocker's Lake is an old flooded gravel pit of approx 90 acres (37.5ha) at Rickmansworth, Hertfordshire, England, within the Colne Valley Regional Park which is designated as a Local Nature Reserve.

The lake is owned by Affinity Water and managed by the Herts and Middlesex Wildlife Trust assisted by the Friends of Stocker's Lake.

== Environment ==
The lake has a number of small islands and is surrounded by mixed woodland, alder carr and willow scrub. It is almost adjacent to Springwell Lake reedbeds.

== Wildlife ==
Situated on the North-South Flyway of the Colne Valley, the reserve is especially attractive to birds both in spring, when many migratory passerines pass through, and in winter, when the lake is full of waterfowl. Common terns nest on specially constructed rafts moored on the lake, and the heronry is the largest in Hertfordshire. Over 60 species of birds are recorded to breed.

== Access ==
The reserve (at TQ042933) is accessible at all times. Entrance to the reserve is via Rickmansworth Aquadrome, where there is car parking. Alternative parking is possible along Springwell Lane.
