= Thomas Burgoyne (cricketer, born 1775) =

English cricketer

Thomas John Burgoyne
- Born: 1775
- Died: 20 October 1847 (aged 71–72)
- Occupation: Cricketer

Thomas John Burgoyne (1775 – 20 October 1847) was an English cricketer who made 24 known appearances from 1796 to 1816. His place of birth is Marylebone; he died in London. He was mainly associated with Middlesex. He played for the Gentlemen in the second Gentlemen v Players match in 1806.

== Bibliography ==
- Haygarth, Arthur (1996) [1862]. Scores & Biographies, Volume 1 (1744–1826). Kennington: Frederick Lillywhite. ISBN 978-19-00592-23-9.
- Haygarth, Arthur (1997) [1862]. Scores & Biographies, Volume 2 (1827–1840). Kennington: Frederick Lillywhite. ISBN 978-19-00592-23-9.
