= Alan Buchanan (naval architect) =

British sailor and naval architect

- Born: 20 October 1922
- Died: 26 January 2015 (aged 92); Saint Peter, Jersey
- Occupations: Naval architect, sailor

Alan Buchanan (1922–2015) was an English naval architect and sailor. He designed over 2400 vessels, including yachts that won the Admiral's Cup, Cowes Week, and the Fastnet Race.

== Biography ==
Buchanan started his career as a draftsman and aircraft engineer at the De Havilland Aircraft Company. His family having a summer house in West Mersea, he was a regular visitor from a young age. After he left de Havilland, he started as a boat designer firstly from his home in Enfield and then at his office which he established in Burnham-on-Crouch.

In the early years many of his designs were built by the boatyard of William Wyatt in West Mersea. By 1950 he had a busy design office in Burnham employing about ten staff.

In 1948 the Burnham boatyard of RH Prior & Son started work on his first design specifically for ocean racing. This was the 10.3 metre (34 feet) Red Gurnet.

The first yacht he designed for himself and his wife was the 9.4m (31') LOA Bermudan Sloop Taeping. She was launched on 15 May 1954 having been built by Priors of Burnham.

In 1956 he was commissioned by the London Rowing Club for a vessel (Casamajor) which had to be fast but with minimal wash for use as a coaching boat for their racing eights on the River Thames. She was built by Tucker Brown & Co. of Burnham.

Sir Maurice Laing commissioned Buchanan to design him a yacht for ocean racing which was the 11.2m (37') Vashti. She was very successful in RORC racing and her sistership Rival, built in Australia, was handicap winner in the 1961 Sydney Hobart race.

In the 1950s and 60s Buchanan was designing steel-built yachts where the basic steelwork was completed in Dutch yards, with the fitting-out being done in England.

Also in the mid-1950s the Buchanan Design Office was working on fibreglass designs and developed the first European-built glassfibre yacht, the 10.6m (35') Bonito. Their first production design was the 6.8m Crystal Class which later became the well-known Halcyon 23 of which well over 1000 have been built. The Diamond Class shortly followed, becoming in 1968 the Halcyon 27, and remained in production until 1975, about 200 having been built.

Although mainly known as a sailing yacht designer, Buchanan was also responsible for motor yachts like the 19.8 metre twin-screw Sita II, as well as numerous commercial motor vessels such as ferries and fishing vessels.

In 1997 he received a medal from the RINA for his small craft designs.

== Designs ==
Buchanan's designs include

- Bonito 35
- Brabant
- Buchanan Dragonfly
- Buchanan Nantucket Clipper 32
- Buchanan Queen 38
- Buchanan Spartan-1
- Buchanan Spartan-2
- Buchanan Viking 30
- Coypu
- Crystal 23
- Diamond 27
- Yawl Marken III
- East Anglian 28
- Halcyon 23
- Halcyon 27
- Halcyon Clipper 26
- Hilbre One Design
- Holliwell 22
- Neptune 33
- Neptunian 33
- Prior 37
- Saxon 34
- Wild Duck 19
- Yeoman Junior
