= Alice Hayes (Quaker) =

- Born: 1657; Rickmansworth
- Died: 8 July 1720 (aged 62–63); Tottenham
- Other name: Alice Smith
- Known for: Quaker preacher and autobiographer
- Spouse(s): Daniel Smith, Thomas Hayes
- Children: five in her first marriage

Alice Hayes (1657 – 1720), also Alice Smith, was an English Quaker preacher and autobiographer.

== Life ==
Hayes was born in Rickmansworth in 1657, and her parents are unknown. She was brought up in the church of England and indulged in behaviour, like singing, that she would later regret as a Quaker. After she became a Quaker in 1680 she was evangelical, in 1696 she attended a Church of England service, and she stopped the service by standing to question the priest. She married a farmer named Daniel Smith, who she converted to her faith. She described him as handsome and faithful, who was tender and loving. After he died she was jailed for over twelve weeks in St Albans jail for not paying the tithes which she objected to on religious grounds. She was the leader of the group, and their objection was that a section of the monies gathered by the Countess of Essex was to pay for the parish priest. In 1701, they stopped trying to jail her, but they gave her heavy fines. In 1707 the crops seized in lieu of money amounted to over 43 pounds.

Her life is documented thanks to an autobiography that she wrote in 1708. She did not include her 1697-second marriage to Thomas Hayes, which was announced in 1697 and made her a widow in 1699. She also failed to mention that she had toured Britain, the Netherlands and Germany talking about her Quaker faith. Hayes enjoyed a greater freedom as a Quaker, as she was allowed to do things traditionally reserved for men. She had led the Quaker group who resisted the tax, and when she moved to Tottenham in 1712 she was described as a "conspicuous member" of that meeting.

She died in Tottenham in 1720. Three years later her "dying sayings" were published and her spiritual biography A Legacy, or, Widow's Mite went to five reprints. No copy of the original manuscript is extant.
