= Halcyon 23 =

Sailing boat class

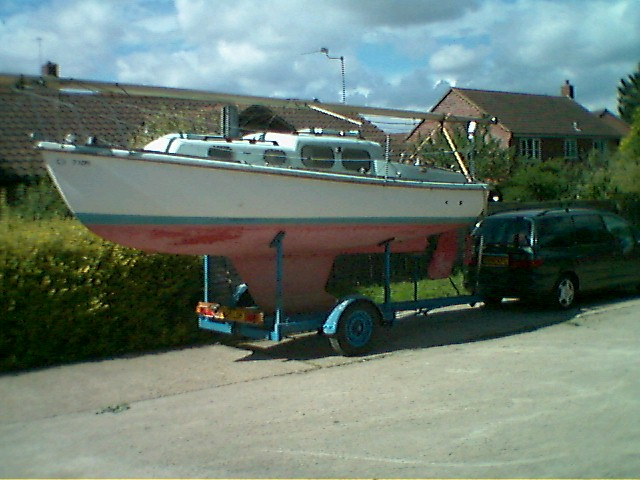

Development
- Designer: Alan Buchanan
- Location: United Kingdom
- Year: 1967
- No. built: 1,000
- Builder: Offshore Yachts Limited
- Role: Cruiser
- Name: Halcyon 23

Boat
- Displacement: 3,100 lb (1,406 kg)
- Draft: 2.25 ft (0.69 m)

Hull
- Type: monohull
- Construction: glassfibre
- LOA: 22.75 ft (6.93 m)
- LWL: 18.67 ft (5.69 m)
- Beam: 7.50 ft (2.29 m)
- Engine: Stuart-Turner petrol engine

Hull appendages
- Keel: triple keel
- Ballast: 1,155 lb (524 kg)
- Rudder: transom-mounted rudder

Rig
- Rig type: Bermuda rig

Sails
- Sailplan: masthead sloop
- Total sail area: 225.00 sq ft (20.903 m^{2})

The Halcyon 23 is a British trailerable sailing boat that was designed by Alan Buchanan as a cruiser and first built in 1967.

The Halcyon 23 is a development of the Buchanan designed 1961 Crystal 23.

== Production ==
The design was built by Offshore Yachts Limited in the United Kingdom, from 1967 until 1975, with 1,000 boats built, but it is now out of production. Boats were supplied both complete and as kits for home completion.

== Design ==
The Halcyon 23 is a recreational keelboat, built predominantly of glassfibre, with wood trim. It has a masthead sloop rig, a spooned raked stem, an angled transom, a transom-hung rudder controlled by a tiller and a fixed fin keel with a weighted bulb or optional triple keels with steel plate side fins. It displaces 3,100 lb (1,406 kg) and carries 1,155 lb (524 kg) of iron ballast.

The boat has a draft of 3.50 ft (1.07 m) with the fin keel and 2.25 ft (0.69 m) with the triple keels.

The boat was factory-fitted with a number of powerplants for docking and manoeuvring, including the British Stuart-Turner petrol engine. The fuel tank holds 10 U.S. gallons (38 L; 8.3 imp gal) and the fresh water tank has a capacity of 20 U.S. gallons (76 L; 17 imp gal).

The design has sleeping accommodation for four people, with a double "V"-berth in the bow cabin and two straight settee berths in the main cabin. The galley is located on both sides of the companionway ladder. The galley is equipped with a two-burner stove and a sink. The head is located on the starboard side under the bow cabin "V"-berth. Cabin headroom is 65 in (170 cm).

The design has a hull speed of 5.8 kn (10.7 km/h).

== Operational history ==
In a 1970 review in Yachts and Yachting concluded, "the Halcyon is a sturdy and comfortable little yacht which, although lacking some of the refinements of more modern designs, may well still have considerable appeal to those who do not believe in cramming the maximum number of separate compartments and berths into the minimum overall length. Not only is she offered with a very reasonable inventory but the general standard of fitting out, particularly below deck, is well above average standards in relation to the very modest price at which she is offered. The yacht is also offered in various stages of completion and many owners have taken advantage of this facility to complete the boat either in standard form or to meet their own ideas."

In a 2010 review Steve Henkel wrote, "best features: The big-boat features offered as standard are impressive, especially the inboard engine. The ballast weight is shown here as 1,100 pounds, but 900 of these are mostly in a bulb at the bottom of a fin keel, so ultimately her ability to stand up in a blow would likely be significantly greater than the boat's comp[etitor]s, all of which are centerboarders with inside ballast. Worst features: The basic boat came with a hand-start inboard engine, which sounds mighty inconvenient for all but the most hardened sail-right-into-the-slip sailors, who never use engines anyway. The outboard rudder is hung on the transom with no support or weed guards below the stock itself, leaving the rudder open to damage if it connects with a rocky bottom, Some do-it-yourself kits were badly finished. Let the boat buyer beware."

== See also ==
- List of sailing boat types
