= Hilbre One Design =

Sailboat class

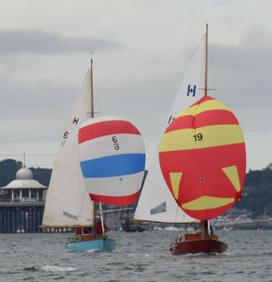
- Hilbres racing in the Menai Strait Regattas

Development
- Designer: Alan Buchanan
- Location: United Kingdom
- Year: 1958
- No. built: 55
- Builder: amateur
- Role: One-design racer
- Name: Hilbre One Design

Boat
- Displacement: 2,000 lb (907 kg)
- Draft: 4.42 ft (1.35 m) with centreboard down

Hull
- Type: monohull
- Construction: wood clinker
- LOA: 19.75 ft (6.02 m)
- Beam: 5.90 ft (1.80 m)

Hull appendages
- Keel: keel with centreboard
- Ballast: 500 lb (227 kg)
- Rudder: transom-mounted rudder

Rig
- Rig type: Bermuda rig

Sails
- Sailplan: fractional rigged sloop masthead sloop

The Hilbre One Design is a British trailerable sailboat that was designed by Alan Buchanan as a one design racer, specifically for the West Kirby Sailing Club in northwest England and first built in 1958.

== Production ==
The design has been built in the United Kingdom since 1958, with 55 boats completed.

== Design ==
The Hilbre One Design is a racing keelboat, built predominantly of wood with clinker construction. It has a fractional sloop rig, a spooned raked stem, a plumb transom, a transom-hung rudder controlled by a tiller and a fixed stub keel with a retractable centreboard. It displaces 2,000 lb (907 kg) and carries 500 lb (227 kg) of iron ballast.

The boat has a draft of 4.42 ft (1.35 m) with the centerboard extended and 1.56 ft (0.48 m) with it retracted, allowing operation in shallow water or ground transportation on a trailer.

For downwind sailing the design is equipped with a spinnaker.

== See also ==
- List of sailing boat types
