= List of Gentlemen v Players matches =

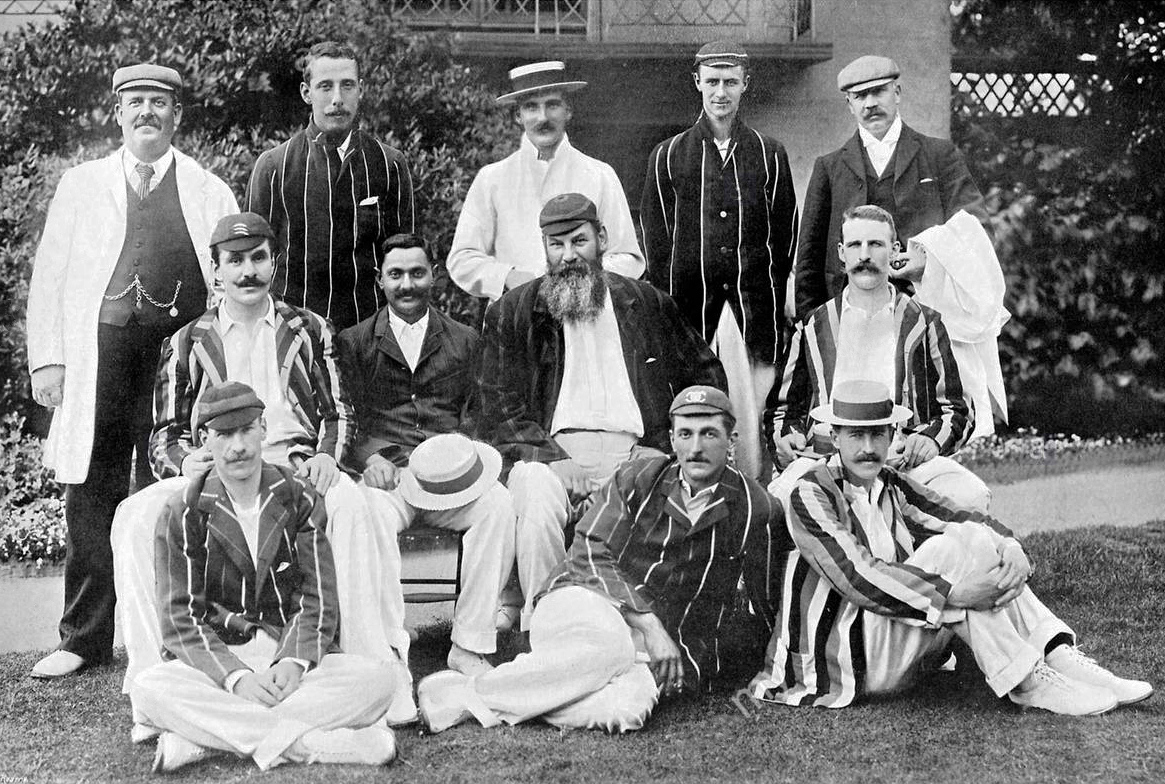
The Gentlemen team, captained by W. G. Grace, which took on the Players at Lord's in 1899

This is a list of all matches played between the Gentlemen and Players between 1806 and 1962. Unless otherwise stated, all matches were scheduled for three days' duration and eleven-a-side.

Three matches were cancelled:

- The first, scheduled to start on 7 September 1914 at Scarborough, was cancelled due to the outbreak of World War I.
- The second, scheduled to start on 9 July 1930 at The Oval, was cancelled due to fixture issues surrounding the County Championship and a second match scheduled (and subsequently played) at Lord's a week later.
- The third, scheduled to start on 6 September 1939 at Scarborough, was cancelled due to the outbreak of World War II.

== Results ==
Matches played	Gentlemen won	Players won	Drawn	Tied
274	68	125	80	1

== Matches ==
List of Gentlemen v Players matches
No.	Date	Venue	Winners	Winning margin	Notes	Ref(s)
1	7 July 1806	Lord's Old Ground	Gentlemen	innings and 14 runs		
2	21 July 1806	Lord's Old Ground	Gentlemen	82 runs		
3	7 July 1819	Lord's Cricket Ground	Players	six wickets		
4	19 June 1820	Lord's	Gentlemen	70 runs		
5	23 July 1821	Lord's	Players	Gentlemen conceded defeat	Played to celebrate the coronation of George IV.	
6	8 July 1822	Lord's	Gentlemen	six wickets		
7	21 July 1823	Lord's	Players	345 runs	Gentlemen, set 402 to win, were bowled out for 56 with two men absent hurt and another retired hurt.	
8	2 August 1824	Lord's	Players	101 runs	Gentlemen had 14 men.	
9	4 July 1825	Lord's	Gentlemen	72 runs	Four-day match; Gentlemen had 16 men.	
10	25 June 1827	Lord's	Gentlemen	29 runs	Gentlemen had 17 men.	
11	9 July 1827	Lord's	Players	innings and 42 runs	Gentlemen had 17 men.	
12	22 June 1829	Lord's	Gentlemen	193 runs	Gentlemen had 12 men; Players were bowled out for 24 and 37.	
13	14 June 1830	Lord's	Drawn		Gentlemen had 12 men; rain ended play on the first day, and washed out the second and third days after the Gentlemen had been bowled out for 46, with the Players 17/3 in reply.	
14	25 June 1831	Lord's	Players	five wickets	The match was arranged as eleven-a-side, but Players only had nine men appear; the match was still an important one.	
15	27 August 1832	Lord's	Players	innings and 34 runs	Gentlemen defended a smaller-than-normal wicket of 22 by 6 inches.	
16	8 July 1833	Lord's	Players	nine wickets	Gentlemen had 16 men.	
17	28 July 1834	Lord's	Players	innings and 21 runs		
18	20 July 1835	Lord's	Players	six wickets		
19	25 July 1836	Lord's	Gentlemen	35 runs	Gentlemen had 18 men.	
20	3 July 1837	Lord's	Players	innings and 10 runs	Players defended an oversized wicket of four stumps measuring 36 by 12 inches, and won despite being bowled out for 99, having been 17/8.	
21	17 July 1837	Lord's	Players	innings and 38 runs	Gentlemen had 16 men.	
22	30 July 1838	Lord's	Players	40 runs		
23	29 July 1839	Lord's	Drawn			
24	29 June 1840	Lord's	Players	nine wickets		
25	12 July 1841	Lord's	Players	three wickets		
26	25 July 1842	Lord's	Gentlemen	95 runs		
27	31 July 1843	Lord's	Gentlemen	innings and 20 runs		
28	29 July 1844	Lord's	Players	38 runs		
29	21 July 1845	Lord's	Players	67 runs	Four-day match.	
30	15 September 1845	Brighton	Drawn		Rain ended play on the first day, and washed out the second and third days, after the Players reached 119/3.	
31	20 July 1846	Lord's	Gentlemen	one wicket		
32	19 July 1847	Lord's	Players	147 runs		
33	31 July 1848	Lord's	Gentlemen	27 runs	Gentlemen won despite being bowled out for 31 in their first innings; Players, set 105 to win, were bowled out for 77.	
34	23 July 1849	Lord's	Gentlemen	innings and 40 runs		
35	22 July 1850	Lord's	Players	innings and 48 runs		
36	23 June 1851	Lord's	Players	innings and 14 runs		
37	21 July 1851	Lord's	Players	innings and 22 runs		
38	19 July 1852	Lord's	Players	five wickets		
39	18 July 1853	Lord's	Gentlemen	60 runs	Gentlemen won despite being bowled out for 37 in their second innings.	
40	17 July 1854	Lord's	Players	nine wickets		
41	23 July 1855	Lord's	Players	seven wickets	Gentlemen, after leading on first innings, were bowled out for 43.	
42	21 July 1856	Lord's	Players	two wickets	Gentlemen were bowled out for 50 in their first innings.	
43	2 July 1857	The Oval	Players	ten wickets		
44	13 July 1857	Lord's	Players	13 runs		
45	1 July 1858	The Oval	Players	three wickets		
46	19 July 1858	Lord's	Players	285 runs		
47	30 June 1859	The Oval	Players	innings and 25 runs		
48	18 July 1859	Lord's	Players	169 runs		
49	5 July 1860	The Oval	Players	eight wickets		
50	9 July 1860	Lord's	Players	innings and 181 runs		
51	1 July 1861	Lord's	Players	innings and 60 runs		
52	4 July 1861	The Oval	Players	innings and 68 runs		
53	26 June 1862	The Oval	Drawn			
54	14 July 1862	Lord's	Players	157 runs		
55	29 July 1863	Lord's	Players	eight wickets		
56	2 July 1863	The Oval	Players	nine wickets		
57	23 June 1864	The Oval	Players	205 runs		
58	27 June 1864	Lord's	Players	innings and 68 runs	Gentlemen were bowled out for 60, and following-on, 59.	
59	3 July 1865	The Oval	Players	118 runs		
60	10 July 1865	Lord's	Gentlemen	eight wickets	Gentlemen broke a winless streak of 20 matches (19 losses, 1 drawn).	
61	25 June 1866	Lord's	Players	38 runs		
62	28 June 1866	The Oval	Gentlemen	98 runs	Gentlemen won after being required to follow-on.	
63	8 July 1867	Lord's	Gentlemen	eight wickets		
64	15 July 1867	The Oval	Drawn			
65	29 June 1868	Lord's	Gentlemen	eight wickets		
66	2 July 1868	The Oval	Gentlemen	innings and 87 runs		
67	24 June 1869	The Oval	Gentlemen	17 runs		
68	28 June 1869	Lord's	Gentlemen	three wickets		
69	14 July 1870	The Oval	Drawn			
70	18 July 1870	Lord's	Gentlemen	four runs		
71	3 July 1871	Lord's	Drawn			
72	6 July 1871	The Oval	Gentlemen	five wickets		
73	14 August 1871	Royal Brunswick Ground, Hove	Drawn			
74	1 July 1872	Lord's	Gentlemen	seven wickets		
75	4 July 1872	The Oval	Gentlemen	nine wickets		
76	30 June 1873	Lord's	Gentlemen	innings and 55 runs		
77	3 July 1873	The Oval	Gentlemen	innings and 11 runs		
78	17 July 1873	Prince's Cricket Ground, London	Gentlemen	innings and 54 runs		
79	2 July 1874	The Oval	Gentlemen	48 runs		
80	6 July 1874	Lord's	Players	two wickets	Players broke a winless streak of 18 matches (15 losses, 3 drawn).	
81	23 July 1874	Prince's Cricket Ground	Gentlemen	60 runs		
82	1 July 1875	The Oval	Drawn			
83	5 July 1875	Lord's	Gentlemen	262 runs		
84	22 July 1875	Prince's Cricket Ground	Players	43 runs		
85	29 June 1876	The Oval	Drawn			
86	3 July 1876	Lord's	Gentlemen	innings and 98 runs		
87	6 July 1876	Prince's Cricket Ground	Gentlemen	five wickets		
88	28 June 1877	The Oval	Drawn			
89	2 July 1877	Lord's	Gentlemen	one wicket	Gentlemen added 46 for the last wicket to win, setting a new record.	
90	5 July 1877	Prince's Cricket Ground	Gentlemen	nine wickets		
91	4 July 1878	The Oval	Gentlemen	55 runs		
92	8 July 1878	Lord's	Gentlemen	206 runs		
93	3 July 1879	The Oval	Gentlemen	innings and 126 runs		
94	7 July 1879	Lord's	Drawn			
95	1 July 1880	The Oval	Players	37 runs		
96	5 July 1880	Lord's	Gentlemen	five wickets		
97	30 June 1881	The Oval	Gentlemen	two wickets		
98	11 July 1881	Lord's	Gentlemen	five wickets		
99	8 August 1881	County Ground, Hove	Players	one run	Gentlemen, set 113 to win, collapsed from 56/0 to 111 all out.	
100	29 June 1882	The Oval	Players	87 runs		
101	3 July 1882	Lord's	Gentlemen	eight wickets		
102	28 June 1883	The Oval	Tied		Gentlemen, set 150 to win, were bowled out for 149 with five minutes remaining.	
103	9 July 1883	Lord's	Gentlemen	seven wickets		
104	3 July 1884	The Oval	Players	nine wickets		
105	7 July 1884	Lord's	Gentlemen	six wickets		
106	2 July 1885	The Oval	Drawn			
107	6 July 1885	Lord's	Players	four wickets		
108	3 September 1885	Scarborough	Gentlemen	innings and 25 runs		
109	12 July 1886	Lord's	Players	five wickets		
110	15 July 1886	The Oval	Drawn			
111	11 July 1887	Lord's	Players	innings and 123 runs		
112	14 July 1887	The Oval	Players	innings and 16 runs		
113	9 July 1888	Lord's	Gentlemen	five runs	Players, set 78 to win, were bowled out for 72.	
114	12 July 1888	The Oval	Players	innings and 39 runs		
115	4 July 1889	The Oval	Players	nine wickets		
116	8 July 1889	Lord's	Players	ten wickets		
117	6 September 1889	Hastings	Gentlemen	one wicket		
118	3 July 1890	The Oval	Players	nine wickets		
119	7 July 1890	Lord's	Drawn			
120	2 July 1891	The Oval	Gentlemen	innings and 54 runs		
121	6 July 1891	Lord's	Drawn			
122	14 September 1891	Hastings	Players	innings and 128 runs		
123	4 July 1892	Lord's	Players	innings and 26 runs		
124	11 July 1892	The Oval	Players	ten wickets		
125	1 September 1892	Scarborough	Drawn			
126	12 September 1892	Hastings	Drawn			
127	6 July 1893	The Oval	Players	eight runs		
128	10 July 1893	Lord's	Drawn			
129	5 July 1894	The Oval	Players	innings and 27 runs		
130	9 July 1894	The Oval	Gentlemen	innings and 39 runs		
131	10 September 1894	Hastings	Drawn			
132	8 July 1895	Lord's	Players	32 runs		
133	11 July 1895	The Oval	Drawn			
134	6 July 1896	The Oval	Gentlemen	one wicket		
135	13 July 1896	Lord's	Gentlemen	six wickets		
136	8 July 1897	The Oval	Players	eight wickets		
137	12 July 1897	Lord's	Players	78 runs		
138	30 August 1897	Scarborough	Drawn			
139	13 September 1897	Hastings	Players	175 runs		
140	13 June 1898	The Oval	Players	eight wickets		
141	18 July 1898	Lord's	Players	137 runs		
142	29 August 1898	Scarborough	Gentlemen	eight wickets		
143	6 July 1899	The Oval	Players	innings and 36 runs		
144	10 July 1899	Lord's	Gentlemen	innings and 59 runs	Digby Jephson (Gentlemen) took 6–21 with underarm lobs.	
145	9 July 1900	The Oval	Players	37 runs	The umpires were replaced at lunch on the first day after an objection from Gentlemen captain W. G. Grace.	
146	16 July 1900	Lord's	Players	two wickets	Despite Tip Foster (102 & 136) being the first man to score a century in each innings in these matches, Players scored 502/8 in their second innings to win.	
147	30 August 1900	Scarborough	Players	innings and 22 runs		
148	8 July 1901	Lord's	Players	221 runs		
149	11 July 1901	The Oval	Players	ten wickets		
150	9 September 1901	Hastings	Drawn			
151	7 July 1902	Lord's	Players	innings and 68 runs		
152	10 July 1902	The Oval	Drawn			
153	1 September 1902	Scarborough	Drawn			
154	6 July 1903	Lord's	Drawn		Gentlemen made 500/2 declared following on (C. B. Fry 232*).	
155	9 July 1903	Scarborough	Gentlemen	54 runs		
156	31 August 1903	Scarborough	Players	innings and eight runs		
157	10 September 1903	Hastings	Drawn			
158	4 July 1904	Lord's	Gentlemen	two wickets		
159	7 July 1904	The Oval	Gentlemen	innings and 39 runs		
160	10 July 1905	Lord's	Players	105 runs		
161	17 July 1905	The Oval	Players	128 runs		
162	9 July 1906	Lord's	Gentlemen	45 runs		
163	16 July 1906	The Oval	Drawn			
164	6 September 1906	Scarborough	Drawn			
165	8 July 1907	Lord's	Drawn			
166	15 July 1907	The Oval	Players	54 runs		
167	2 July 1908	Lord's	Players	seven wickets		
168	9 July 1908	The Oval	Gentlemen	six wickets		
169	3 September 1908	Scarborough	Drawn			
170	8 July 1909	The Oval	Players	64 runs		
171	12 July 1909	Lord's	Players	200 runs		
172	6 September 1909	Scarborough	Drawn			
173	7 July 1910	The Oval	Players	innings and 22 runs		
174	11 July 1910	Lord's	Players	ten wickets		
175	5 September 1910	Scarborough	Drawn			
176	6 July 1911	The Oval	Drawn			
177	10 July 1911	Lord's	Gentlemen	130 runs		
178	4 September 1911	Scarborough	Drawn			
179	11 July 1912	The Oval	Drawn			
180	18 July 1912	Lord's	Drawn			
181	10 July 1913	The Oval	Drawn			
182	14 July 1913	Lord's	Players	seven wickets		
183	4 September 1913	Scarborough	Gentlemen	six runs		
184	9 July 1914	The Oval	Players	241 runs		
185	13 July 1914	Lord's	Gentlemen	134 runs		
186	3 July 1919	The Oval	Drawn			
187	14 July 1919	Lord's	Drawn			
188	4 September 1919	Lord's	Players	innings and 110 runs	Jack Hobbs uniquely scored centuries in all three matches in 1919.	
189	3 June 1920	The Oval	Players	innings and 87 runs		
190	14 July 1920	Lord's	Players	seven wickets		
191	6 September 1920	Scarborough	Drawn			
192	29 June 1921	Lord's	Players	innings and three runs		
193	13 July 1921	Lord's	Players	nine wickets		
194	5 September 1921	Scarborough	Players	198 runs		
195	5 July 1922	The Oval	Drawn			
196	19 July 1922	Lord's	Drawn			
197	7 September 1922	Scarborough	Drawn			
198	4 July 1923	The Oval	Players	six wickets		
199	18 July 1923	Lord's	Drawn			
200	6 September 1923	Scarborough	Drawn			
201	2 July 1924	The Oval	Players	six wickets		
202	16 July 1924	Lord's	Players	innings and 231 runs		
203	1 September 1924	Blackpool	Players	nine wickets	The only Gentlemen v Players match at this venue.	
204	6 September 1924	Scarborough	Drawn			
205	8 July 1925	The Oval	Gentlemen	four wickets	Gentlemen broke a winless streak of 19 matches (10 losses, 9 drawn).	
206	15 July 1925	Lord's	Drawn			
207	2 September 1925	Scarborough	Drawn			
208	5 September 1925	Folkestone	Players	nine wickets		
209	7 July 1926	The Oval	Players	seven wickets		
210	14 July 1926	Lord's	Drawn			
211	1 September 1926	Scarborough	Drawn		Players captain Jack Hobbs scored 266, a record in Gentlemen v Players matches.	
212	6 July 1927	The Oval	Drawn			
213	13 July 1927	Lord's	Drawn			
214	31 August 1927	Folkestone	Players	innings and 81 runs		
215	3 September 1927	Scarborough	Drawn			
216	6 June 1928	The Oval	Drawn			
217	18 July 1928	Lord's	Players	nine wickets		
218	5 September 1928	Bournemouth	Gentlemen	one wicket	The only Gentlemen v Players match at this venue.	
219	8 September 1928	Folkestone	Players	five wickets		
220	10 July 1929	The Oval	Drawn			
221	17 July 1929	Lord's	Players	seven wickets		
222	16 July 1930	Lord's	Drawn			
223	10 September 1930	Folkestone	Drawn			
224	10 June 1931	The Oval	Drawn			
225	15 July 1931	Lord's	Drawn			
226	2 September 1931	Folkestone	Drawn			
227	5 September 1931	Scarborough	Drawn			
228	6 July 1932	The Oval	Drawn			
229	13 July 1932	Lord's	Drawn			
230	31 August 1932	Folkestone	Players	47 runs		
231	19 July 1933	Lord's	Players	ten wickets		
232	6 September 1933	Folkestone	Players	innings and 46 runs		
233	11 July 1934	The Oval	Players	innings and 305 runs		
234	25 July 1934	Lord's	Gentlemen	seven wickets	Gentlemen broke a winless streak of 15 matches (six losses, nine drawn).	
235	5 September 1934	Scarborough	Drawn		Played simultaneously with the match below; Gentlemen, set 224 to win, were 203/9 when time expired.	
236	5 September 1934	Folkestone	Gentlemen	three wickets	Played simultaneously with the match above.	
237	17 July 1935	Lord's	Players	nine wickets		
238	4 September 1935	Folkestone	Drawn			
239	15 July 1936	Lord's	Drawn			
240	5 September 1936	Folkestone	Drawn			
241	14 July 1937	Lord's	Players	eight wickets		
242	13 July 1938	Lord's	Gentlemen	133 runs		
243	7 September 1938	Scarborough	Players	five wickets	Players scored 5/130 in 50 minutes to win with one minute remaining.	
244	5 July 1939	Lord's	Players	160 runs		
245	17 July 1946	Lord's	Players	innings and 140 runs	Gentlemen collapsed from 138/4 to 144 all out in first innings.	
246	16 July 1947	Lord's	Drawn			
247	10 September 1947	Scarborough	Players	innings and ten runs		
248	14 July 1948	Lord's	Drawn			
249	13 July 1949	Lord's	Players	four wickets		
250	26 July 1950	Lord's	Drawn		Players, set 253 to win, were 241/9 when time expired.	
251	18 July 1951	Lord's	Players	21 runs		
252	5 September 1951	Scarborough	Drawn			
253	23 July 1952	Lord's	Players	two runs		
254	6 September 1952	Scarborough	Drawn		Gentlemen, set 254 to win, were 252/8 when time expired.	
255	15 July 1953	Lord's	Gentlemen	95 runs		
256	5 September 1953	Scarborough	Gentlemen	five wickets	Gentlemen won after conceding 532/5 declared (Len Hutton 241) in first innings.	
257	14 July 1954	Lord's	Players	49 runs		
258	4 September 1954	Scarborough	Players	50 runs		
259	13 July 1955	Lord's	Players	20 runs		
260	3 September 1955	Scarborough	Players	two wickets		
261	18 July 1956	Lord's	Drawn			
262	1 September 1956	Scarborough	Players	seven wickets		
263	17 July 1957	Lord's	Drawn		Players (46/9 declared in the first innings), set 290 to win, were 242/9 when time expired.	
264	4 September 1957	Scarborough	Players	six wickets		
265	16 July 1958	Lord's	Drawn			
266	6 September 1958	Scarborough	Players	55 runs		
267	15 July 1959	Lord's	Drawn			
268	5 September 1959	Scarborough	Players	ten wickets		
269	13 July 1960	Lord's	Drawn			
270	3 September 1960	Scarborough	Drawn			
271	19 July 1961	Lord's	Players	172 runs		
272	2 September 1961	Scarborough	Players	54 runs		
273	18 July 1962	Lord's	Drawn			
274	8 September 1962	Scarborough	Players	seven wickets		
