= John Pointer (antiquary) =

English cleric and antiquary (1668–1754)

John Pointer (1668–1754) was an English cleric and antiquary.

== Life ==
Born at Alkerton, Oxfordshire, on 19 May 1668, he was son of John Pointer, rector there from 1663 till his death in 1710, and Elizabeth (d. 1709), daughter of John Hobel, a London merchant. He was educated at Banbury grammar school, and then at Preston Deanery school, Northamptonshire. He matriculated at Merton College, Oxford, on 24 January 1687, graduating B.A. 1691, and M.A. 1694.

Pointer took holy orders, being ordained deacon on 24 December 1693, and priest on 23 September 1694, and from 1693 until he resigned the office in 1732 he was chaplain to his college. According to Thomas Hearne, Pointer was removed for sodomy.

Instituted in September 1694 to the rectory of Slapton, Northamptonshire, Pointer retained the post for life. He was lord of the manor of Keresley in Warwickshire, and in December 1722 he came into other property in the parish. He died on 16 January 1754 in the house of his niece, Mrs. Bradborne of Chesterton in Worfield, Shropshire, and was buried in the chancel of Worfield parish church on 19 January. A tablet was erected to his memory.

== Works ==
Pointer was author of:

- An Account of a Roman pavement lately found at Stunsfield, Oxfordshire, 1713; dedicated to John Holland, Warden of Merton College. In reply to criticism, Pointer created an advertisement containing praise from White Kennett, William Musgrave, and others.
- Chronological History of England, 1714, 2 vols. Rather complete in description of events occurring after 1660. It was intended that the narrative should end with the peace of Utrecht (1713), but the second volume was not published until after the death of Queen Anne, when the history was brought down to her death. Six supplements, each containing the incidents of a year, and the last two with the name of "Mr. Brockwel" on the title-page, carried it on to the close of July 1720. Pointer was paid by Bernard Lintot for his work on it.
- Miscellanea in usum juventutis Academicæ, 1718. It contained characters, chronology, and a catalogue of the classical authors with notes for reading them.
- A Rational Account of the Weather, 1723; 2nd ed. corrected and enlarged, 1738. It was pointed out in the Gentleman's Magazine, 1748 (pp. 255–6), that this volume supplied the groundwork of The Shepherd of Banbury's Rules to judge of the Weather, by "John Claridge the shepherd" (which is usually attributed to John Campbell).
- Britannia Romana, or Roman antiquities in Britain, viz., coins, camps, and public roads, 1724.
- Britannia Triumphans, or an Historical Account of some of the most signal Naval Victories obtained by the English over the Spaniards,’ 1743.
- Oxoniensis Academia, or the Antiquities and Curiosities of the University of Oxford, 1749.

== Notes ==
Attribution

This article incorporates text from a publication now in the public domain: Lee, Sidney, ed. (1896). "Pointer, John". Dictionary of National Biography. Vol. 46. London: Smith, Elder & Co.
