= Ray White (cricketer) =

South African cricketer (born 1941)

Personal information
- Full name: Raymond Christopher White
- Born: 29 January 1941 (age 85); Johannesburg, South Africa
- Batting: Right-handed
- Bowling: Right-arm medium-pace

Domestic team information
- Years: Team
- 1962–1964: Gloucestershire

Career statistics
Competition	FC	List A
Matches	141	8
Runs scored	6824	211
Batting average	27.96	35.16
100s/50s	10/35	0/1
Top score	205	64
Balls bowled	1079	–
Wickets	17	–
Bowling average	34.64	–
5 wickets in innings	0	–
10 wickets in match	0	–
Best bowling	3/17	–
Catches/stumpings	67/0	2/0
- Source: Cricinfo, 31 July 2013

Raymond Christopher White (born 29 January 1941) is a former South African cricketer. He played for Gloucestershire between 1962 and 1964 and for Transvaal from 1965–66 to 1972–73.

White was educated at Hilton College and the University of Cambridge, where he participated in the 1962 Varsity Match.

He was president of Cricket South Africa from 1998 to 2000.
