= Bury Lake Young Mariners =

Sailing School in Rickmansworth

Bury Lake Young Mariners is an RYA-certified sailing school and training centre for people aged 7+ that has been in operation since 1983 at Bury Lake at Rickmansworth Aquadrome, Hertfordshire, England. The charity has more than 100 boats and each year enables around 7,500 mostly young people to go sailing.

BLYM has no paid staff, and is run entirely by over 300 volunteers.

== History ==
=== Lake Formation ===
During the early 1900's, land between the River Colne and the Grand Union Canal was taken over by the Rickmansworth Gravel Company, in 1902. Dry and wet digging took place closer to Croxley Green, but once supplies were exhausted, digging moved to the Aquadrome area, starting firstly on Batchworth Lake and then moving on to Bury and Stockers Lakes. Steam cranes were used on flat pontoons, for the majority of the digging. It was sorted by means of size, with the original stones being returned to the lake, explaining the small islands in the Stockers and Batchworth lakes. Useful material that was collected, was used to build the original Wembley Stadium and the British Empire Exhibition of 1924.

== Awards ==
=== 2013 ===
In 2013, Bury Lake Young Mariners won the Queen's Award for Voluntary Service. The award is equivalent to the MBE and is the highest award that can be made to a voluntary group. The award was made for "assisting with youth development through accessible and affordable sailing and sail training activities".

=== 2015 ===
The charity was one of five finalists for Club of the Year, awarded by the Royal Yachting Association.
