= John Pointer (cricketer) =

English cricketer

John Pointer (1782 in England – 1815 in England) was an English professional cricketer.

== Career ==
He was mainly associated with Hampshire and he made 15 known appearances from 1803 to 1810.

== External sources ==
- CricketArchive record
