= 1803 English cricket season =

Cricket season review

The 1803 English cricket season was the 17th since the foundation of Marylebone Cricket Club (MCC). Thomas Howard made his debut in historically important matches. Details of ten historically important eleven-a-side matches are known. (Note: Any match listed in the ACS' Important Match Guide (1981) is historically important, and therefore of the highest standard, whether or not a scorecard might exist. The same applies to numerous matches discovered by researchers since 1981. For further information, see First-class cricket.)

== Events ==
- Prime Minister William Pitt referred to cricket when introducing his Defence Bill.
- With the Napoleonic War continuing, loss of investment and manpower impacted cricket and only three matches have been recorded in 1803:
  - 21–24 June: England v Surrey at Lord's Old Ground
  - 4–6 July: Nottinghamshire & Leicestershire v Hampshire at Lord's Old Ground
  - 11–12 July: England v Surrey at Lord's Old Ground
- Another match that has sometimes been regarded as important is H. C. Woolridge's XI v W. R. Capel's XI at Clifford's Park, Rickmansworth, on Friday 26 August.

== Bibliography ==
- ACS (1981). A Guide to Important Cricket Matches Played in the British Isles 1709–1863. Nottingham: ACS. OCLC 85045528.
- Haygarth, Arthur (1996) [1862]. Scores & Biographies, Volume 1 (1744–1826). Kennington: Frederick Lillywhite. ISBN 978-19-00592-23-9.
- Warner, Pelham (1946). Lords: 1787–1945. London: Harrap. OCLC 877106024.
