= Rickmansworth =

Town in Hertfordshire, England

Coordinates: 51.6383°N 0.4659°W

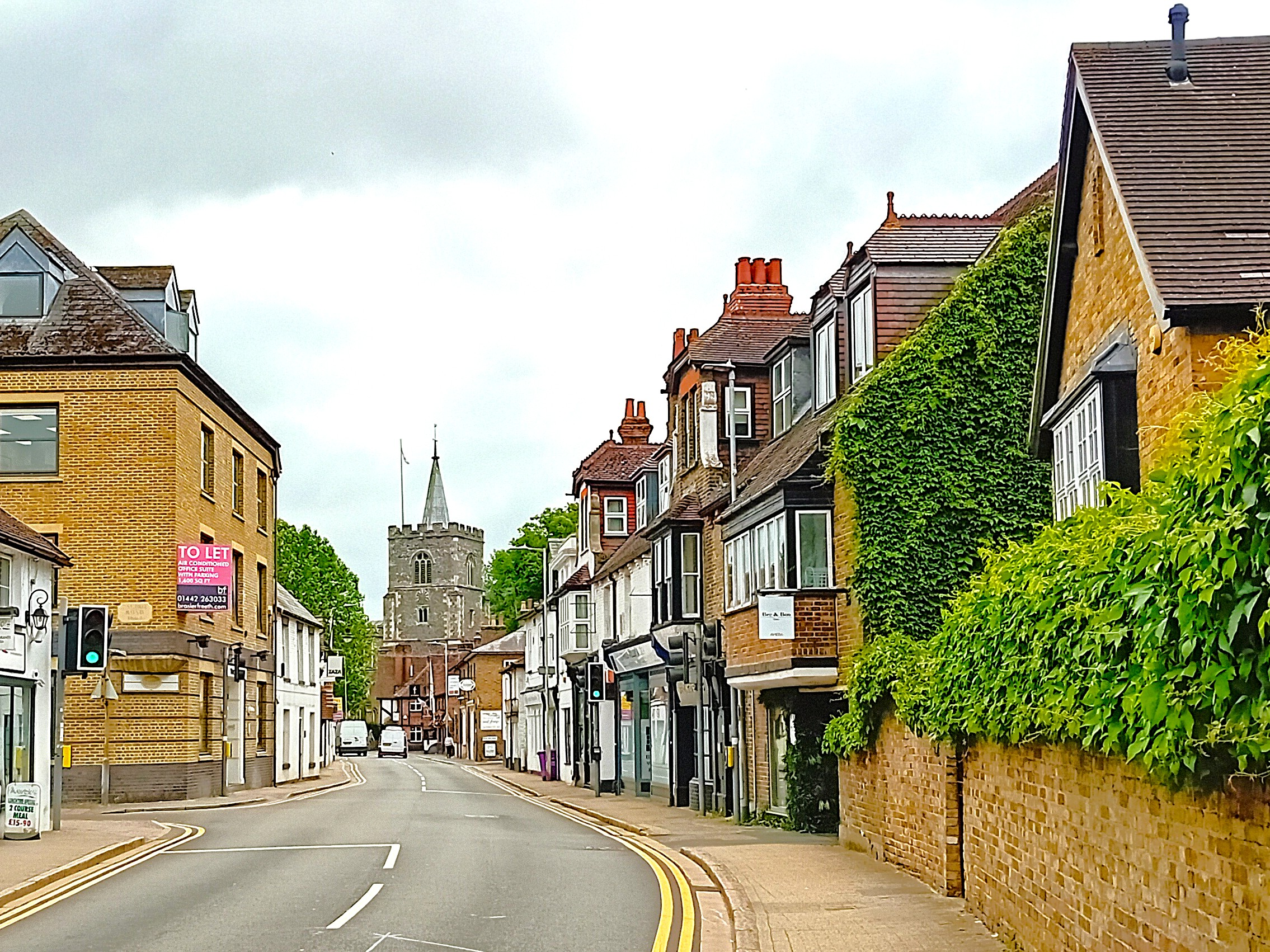
- Church Street looking towards St Mary's Church

- Location within Hertfordshire
- Population: 25,413 (2020 approx)
- OS grid reference: TQ061944
- District: Three Rivers
- Shire county: Hertfordshire
- Region: East
- Country: England
- Sovereign state: United Kingdom
- Post town: RICKMANSWORTH
- Postcode district: WD3
- Dialling code: 01923
- Police: Hertfordshire
- Fire: Hertfordshire
- Ambulance: East of England
- UK Parliament: South West Hertfordshire

Rickmansworth (/ˈrɪkmənzwəθ/) is a town in south-west Hertfordshire, England, located approximately 17 miles (27 km) north-west of central London, 5 miles (8 km) south-west of Watford and inside the perimeter of the M25 motorway. The town is mainly to the north of the Grand Union Canal (formerly the Grand Junction Canal) and the River Colne.

Rickmansworth is the administrative seat of the Three Rivers District Council; the confluence of the River Chess and the River Gade with the Colne in Rickmansworth inspired the district's name. The enlarged Colne flows south to form a major tributary of the River Thames.

The town is served by the Metropolitan line of the London Underground and by Chiltern Railways of the National Rail network, between London Marylebone and Aylesbury.

== Toponymy ==
The name Rickmansworth comes from the Saxon name Ryckmer, the local landowner, and worth meaning a farm within an enclosure or stockade. In the Domesday Book of 1086 it was recorded as the Manor of Prichemaresworde. Other spellings include Rykemarwurthe (1119–46), Richemaresworthe (1180), Rykemerewrthe (1248), Richemereworthe (1259), Rikesmareswrth (1287), Rikmansworth (1382), Rikmeresworth (1396) and Rykemerysworth (1418).

== History ==
There was a settlement in this part of the Colne Valley in the Stone Age. Rickmansworth was one of five manors with which the great Abbey of St Albans had been endowed when founded in 793 by King Offa of Mercia. Local tithes supported the abbey, which provided clergy to serve the people until the dissolution of the monasteries in 1539. Around the time of the Domesday Book, the population of "Prichemareworth" may have been about 200.

Cardinal Wolsey, in his capacity as Abbot of St Albans, held the Manor of le More in the valley. The manor house was replaced by the hill-top mansion Moor Park, which eventually became the residence of Admiral Lord Anson, who commissioned Capability Brown to remake the formal gardens, and in 1828 of the Barons Ebury; it is now the Golf Club House. The wider area, including Croxley Green, Moor Park, Batchworth, Mill End, West Hyde and Chorleywood, formed the original parish of Rickmansworth.

In 1851, the population had grown to 4,800, and the parish was divided. St Mary's Church serves the parish concentrated in the town and extending to Batchworth and parts of Moor Park. The town had a population of 14,571 recorded at the 2001 census.

The three rivers, the Colne, Chess and Gade, provided water for the watercress trade and power for corn milling, silk weaving, paper making and brewing, all long gone. Other industries have included leather-tanning, soft drinks, laundry, straw-plaiting and stocking production. Now, the rivers, canal and flooded gravel pits provide for recreation.

West Mill, a water mill, existed at the time of the Domesday Survey. It was leased to the abbot and convent of St Albans by Ralph Bukberd for a term of years ending in 1539. In 1533, they leased it from the end of this term for twenty-six years to Richard Wilson of Watford. He was to keep in repair the mill and also two millstones, 10 inches (25 centimetres) thick, and 4 ft 8 in (142 cm) in breadth. The mill was leased in 1544 to William Hutchinson, yeoman of the spicery, and Janet his wife for their lives. It afterwards came to John Wilson, and was granted in 1576–77 to Richard Master. There was also a water-mill called Batchworth Mill, and a fishery called Blacketts Mill in Rickmansworth. Batchworth Mill was later used as a cotton mill, but was bought in 1820 by John Dickinson & Co., and converted into paper mills, now the site of Affinity Water. Scotsbridge Mill was also productive but is now a restaurant with the unusual feature of a salmon run. During the sixteenth and seventeenth centuries many of the principal inhabitants were described as "clothiers", from which it may be inferred that the manufacture of cloth was at one time carried on in the parish, but this industry has long since ceased. There were also silk and flock mills here, described in 1808 as recently built.

A long-running dispute over water levels in the Batchworth area, following construction of the Grand Junction Canal, was resolved in 1825, when an 8-foot-3-inch (2.51 m) obelisk was erected in a pond, to act as a water gauge. It records the agreement made between the canal company, John Dickinson the miller at Batchworth Mill, and R. Williams of Moor Park the landowner.

In July 1860, Lord Ebury obtained powers in the Watford and Rickmansworth Railway Act 1860 (23 & 24 Vict. c. cxi) to construct a 4 1/2-mile (7.2 km) single-track railway line, the Watford and Rickmansworth Railway (WRR) between Rickmansworth and Watford. Opening in October 1862, Rickmansworth (Church Street) railway station was opposite the parish church of St Mary, with interchange sidings to the Grand Union Canal. The line had stations at Watford Junction and Watford High Street and a depot in Watford. The Uxbridge and Rickmansworth Railway Act 1861 (24 & 25 Vict. c. lxxiii) was obtained a year later to construct an extension from Rickmansworth to connect with the Great Western Railway's Uxbridge branch, but this was never realised.

Despite hopes that the railway would bring economic development and serve the factories and warehouses that had developed along the Grand Union Canal, it was Watford that grew at a faster pace and drew business from Rickmansworth. The railway was dogged with financial problems and a further act of Parliament the Watford and Rickmansworth Railway (Sale) Act 1863 (26 & 27 Vict. c. cxxxi) authorised the issue of further shares to the value of £30,000 (£40,000 worth had already been issued). The service consisted of five trains each way. The line was worked from the outset by the London and North Western Railway (LNWR), which paid the WRR 50% of the gross earnings.

The railway was never financially successful and the Official Receiver was called in four years after opening. The company attempted to remedy its financial problems by opening several freight branches, the most notable being to the Croxley printers and to the Grand Union Canal at Croxley Green. The company was absorbed by the burgeoning LNWR whose station it shared at Watford Junction in 1881.

Rickmansworth grew dramatically during the Victorian era and in the 1920s and 1930s as part of Metro-land, due to the extension of the Metropolitan Railway, and became a commuter town.

== Transport ==
=== Railway ===
Rickmansworth station is served by passenger services on two lines:

- London to Aylesbury Line, on the National Rail network, from Marylebone station to Aylesbury, via Harrow. Services are operated by Chiltern Railways;
- Metropolitan line trains on the London Underground network. Services operate between Aldgate and Baker Street to Amersham and Chesham.

=== Buses ===
Local bus services are operated by several companies, including Arriva and Red Rose Travel; key routes include:

- 322 Rickmansworth to Watford and Hemel Hempstead
- 336 Chorleywood to Watford and North Bushey
- 724 Heathrow Airport to Harlow, via St Albans and Ware.
- 725 Heathrow Airport to Stevenage via Rickmansworth, Watford, St Albans and Welwyn Garden City.
- R1/R2 Chorleywood or Maple Cross to Mount Vernon Hospital
- W1 Maple Cross to Garston (Sundays only)

=== Roads ===
Junctions 17 and 18 of the M25 motorway are within Rickmansworth's boundaries, giving access to Heathrow Airport and the national motorway network.

== Politics and economy ==
Rickmansworth is a part of the UK Parliament constituency of South West Hertfordshire. Gagan Mohindra has been the Member of Parliament since the December 2019 United Kingdom general election.

The agricultural co-operative, Quality Milk Producers has its headquarters in Scotsbridge House, as do the English Guernsey Cattle Society, the Jersey Cattle Society, the UK Holstein Society, the British Friesian Breeders Club, the Milk Development Council and the Centre for Dairy Information.

== Police station ==
In 1897, a police station opened in the High Street adjoining the fire station. The site of a later police station on Rectory Road was purchased by Lidl in 2013 for £2.3 million and the building was demolished. The residents association (RDRA) and district council have opposed the proposal for a store. Lidl were still exploring plans to open the store in late 2022 whilst using the site for “storage purposes”.

Rickmansworth police station is now located within the district council’s Three Rivers House offices in Northway.

== Geography ==
Valley Road in Rickmansworth has a frost hollow. This is caused by the local geography, notably the railway embankment which prevents the natural drainage of cold air from a specific part of the valley. The greatest daily temperature range in England was recorded on 29 August 1936 in Rickmansworth when the temperature climbed from 1.1 °C at dawn to 24.9 °C within 9 hours due to this unusual geographic feature.

== Administrative history ==
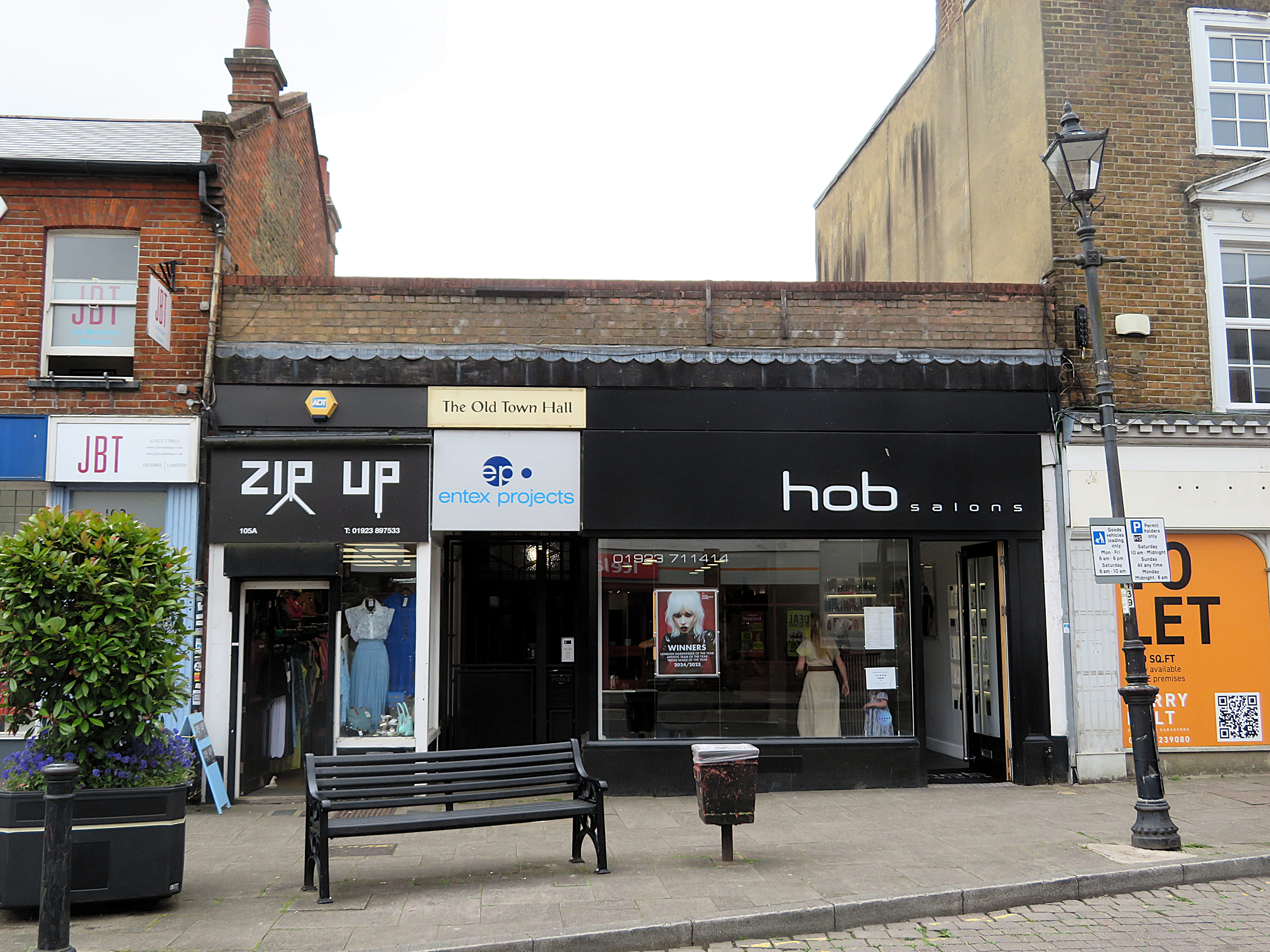
Old Town Hall: Remains of building, now converted into shops

=== Parish ===
Rickmansworth was an ancient parish. Following the Poor Law Amendment Act 1834 the parish was included in the Watford Poor Law Union, established in 1835. When sanitary districts were created in 1872, the parish of Rickmansworth therefore became part of the Watford Rural Sanitary District, which in turn became Watford Rural District in December 1894.

=== Rickmansworth Urban District (1898–1974) ===
Rickmansworth
- Urban District
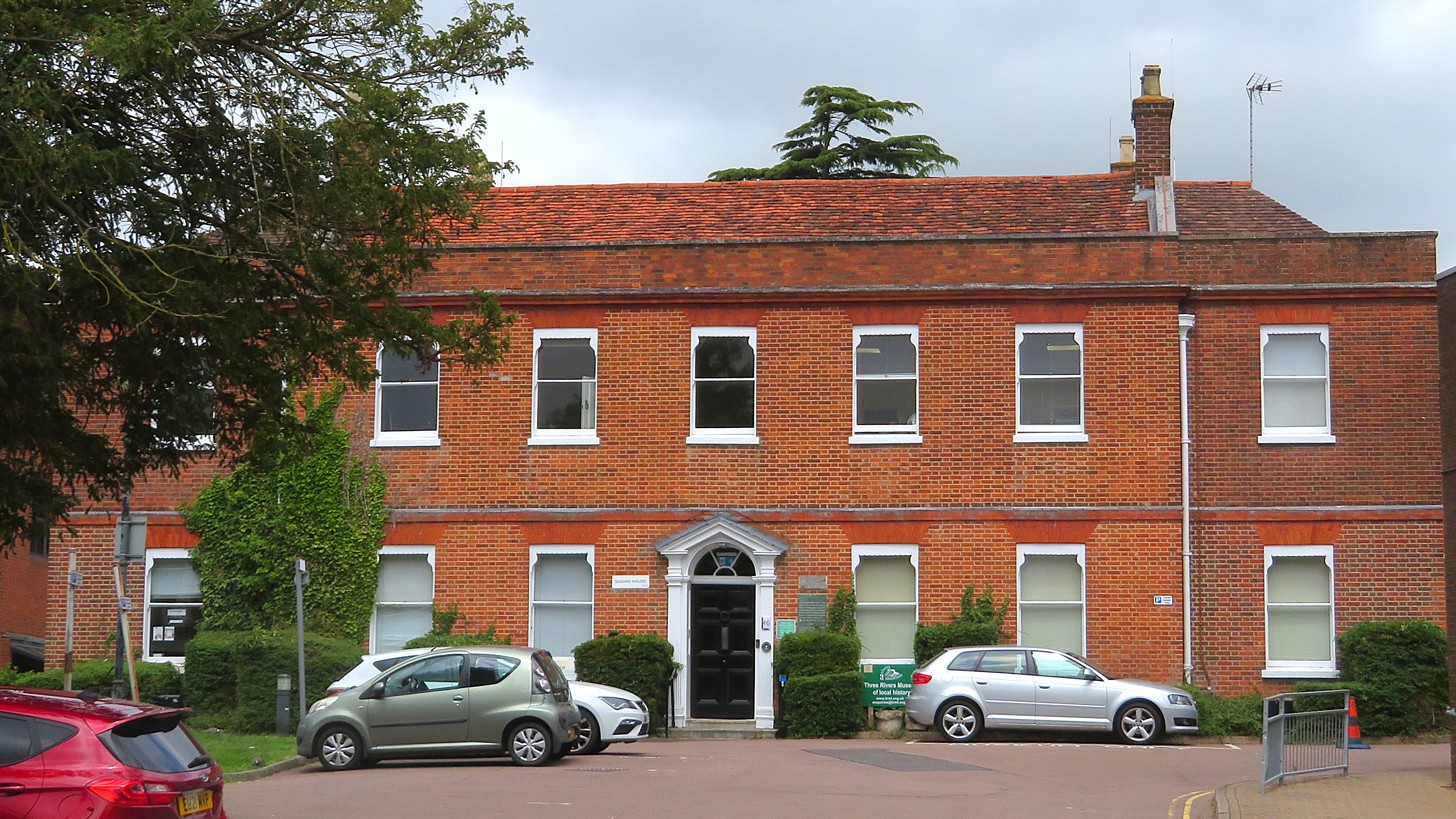
- Basing House, 46 High Street, Rickmansworth

Coat of arms
- Population
  - 1901: 5,627
  - 1971: 28,820
- History
  - Created: 15 April 1898
  - Abolished: 31 March 1974
  - Succeeded by: Three Rivers
  - HQ: Rickmansworth
- Contained within
  - County Council: Hertfordshire

Shortly after Watford Rural District had been created, the process of creating an urban district for the town of Rickmansworth began. An inquiry was held in February 1896 at the Town Hall in Rickmansworth, considering whether to turn the parish into an urban district The initial conclusion was that the whole parish was not appropriate for becoming an urban district, but that an urban district could perhaps be created for just part of it. It was eventually decided to split the parish of Rickmansworth into three parts. The hamlet of Chorleywood was made into a separate parish, whilst the remainder of Rickmansworth parish was split between a Rickmansworth Urban parish (covering the built-up area including Mill End, Rickmansworth and Croxley Green), and a Rickmansworth Rural parish. The Rickmansworth Rural parish was not one contiguous area, but a number of detached pieces of land around the edges of the original parish. The Chorleywood and Rickmansworth Rural parishes remained in the Watford Rural District, whilst the parish of Rickmansworth Urban became Rickmansworth Urban District. These changes all came into force on 15 April 1898. The first meeting of Rickmansworth Urban District Council was held on 16 April 1898 at the Town Hall at 105 High Street in Rickmansworth. William Culley was elected the first chairman of the council.

In 1930, Rickmansworth Urban District Council bought Basing House at 46 High Street in Rickmansworth, which had once been the home of William Penn. The council converted Basing House to become its offices and meeting place, holding its first meeting there in November 1930.

The Rickmansworth Rural parish was abolished in 1935, with most of its area being added to Rickmansworth Urban District and the remainder to the neighbouring parish of Sarratt.

Rickmansworth Urban District Council was granted a coat of arms on 30 October 1953.

Under the Local Government Act 1972, Rickmansworth Urban District was abolished, becoming part of the district of Three Rivers on 1 April 1974.

=== After 1974 ===
No successor parish was created for Rickmansworth in 1974 and so it became an unparished area, governed directly by Three Rivers District Council.

Two parish councils were subsequently created from parts of the former Rickmansworth Urban District. The civil parish of Croxley Green was created on 1 April 1986, covering the eastern part of the former Rickmansworth Urban District and an adjoining area transferred from the parish of Sarratt.

The civil parish of Batchworth was created on 1 April 2017 covering the two Three Rivers district wards of Rickmansworth Town, and Moor Park and Eastbury. The Batchworth parish therefore covers much of Rickmansworth, including the town centre. The Batchworth and Croxley Green parishes do not cover the whole of the former Rickmansworth Urban District, with two areas remaining unparished: one around Maple Cross and Mill End, and another near Loudwater.

== Education ==
=== Junior schools ===
- Arnett Hills JMI School
- Rickmansworth Park Junior Mixed and Infant School
- Shepherd Primary School
- St. John's Catholic Primary School
- St. Mary's C of E Primary School
- St. Peter's C of E Voluntary Aided Primary School

=== Secondary schools ===
- Rickmansworth School
- St. Clement Danes School
- St Joan of Arc Catholic School
- The Reach Free School

=== Independent schools ===
- The Royal Masonic School for Girls
- Merchant Taylors’ Prep School
- York House Prep School

== Culture and sport ==
Watersmeet is a 515-seat theatre complex owned by the Three Rivers District Council in the town centre. Its auditorium can be transformed from a raked theatre to a flat floor for performances in the round, dancing, cabaret, weddings, indoor markets and craft fairs. The Rickmansworth Players (affiliated to NODA) is an amateur dramatics society that performs musicals and plays on a regular basis. Rickmansworth Historical Society meets monthly from September to June in the Cloisters Hall.

Rickmansworth is sometimes shortened to "Ricky", as used in the annual Ricky Week celebrations which occur in May. The town's canal history is remembered at the end of the week with the Rickmansworth Festival organised by Rickmansworth Waterways Trust. The annual Ricky Road Run takes place with more than 500 runners. The annual Victorian Evening, held in the town centre at the end of November, was changed to Starlight Evening in 2011.

The first page of The Hitchhiker's Guide to the Galaxy features a girl in a café in Rickmansworth who realises how to make the world "a good and happy place", before the planet is promptly destroyed. She appears again, named as Fenchurch, in So Long, and Thanks for All the Fish.

=== Aquadrome ===
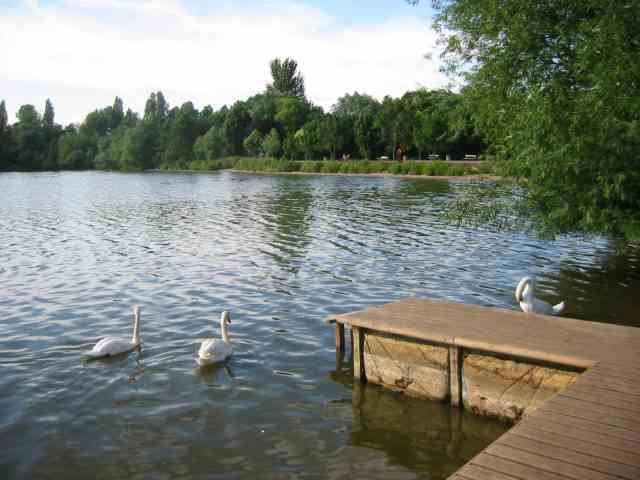
Bury Lake

The Aquadrome covers 41 hectares (100 acres) and includes the Aquadrome Local Nature Reserve, Batchworth and Bury Lakes, open grassland, areas of woodland, car parking, a café and a children's play area. Its boundaries are the River Colne to the north, the Grand Union Canal to the east and south and Stocker's Lake nature reserve to the west. In July 2009, it received a Green Flag Award for parks and open spaces which meet high standards.

The lakes are old gravel quarries filled with water and stocked with fish but only Batchworth Lake is available for fishing. Some gravel from the site was used to build Wembley Stadium in 1923. Batchworth Lake is popular for water skiing events and hosts the Rickmansworth Water Ski Club.

Bury Lake is home to Bury Lake Young Mariners (BLYM); a sailing club and RYA-recognised teaching establishment.

=== Sports clubs ===
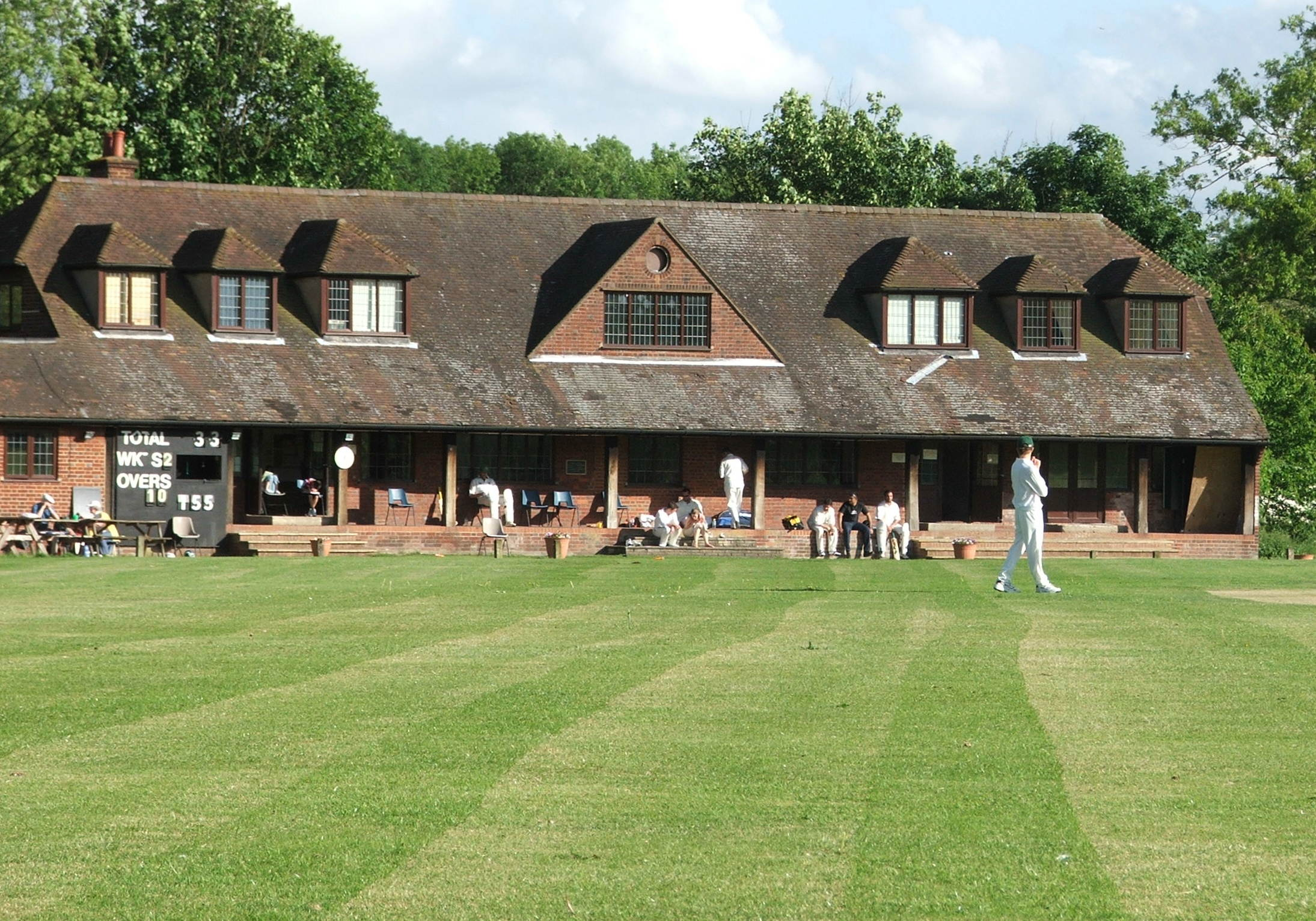
Rickmansworth Cricket and Sports Club

Rickmansworth Cricket Club was founded in 1787 and is one of the oldest recorded clubs in England. Its clubhouse was built in 1921 by Sir William Francis Reckitt – a member of the Reckitt and Colman Mustard dynasty. Rickmansworth Sports Club runs five teams in the Saracens Hertfordshire Cricket League. Rickmansworth golf course is adjacent to Moor Park golf course. Rickmansworth Lawn Tennis Club also hosts Rickmansworth table tennis club matches. Rickmansworth Water Ski Club is located on Batchworth Lake. The William Penn Leisure Centre has an indoor swimming pool and sports facilities.

=== Media ===
Because of its proximity to London, television signals are received from the Crystal Palace TV transmitter, placing Rickmansworth in the BBC London and ITV London areas.

Local radio stations are BBC Three Counties Radio, Heart Hertfordshire, Tring Radio and Vibe 107.6, a community-based station which broadcasts from Watford.

The town is served by the local newspaper, The Watford Observer.

== Filming ==
- The Adventures of Black Beauty (1972)
- Grange Hill (1978)
- Raiders of the Lost Ark (1981)
- Withnail and I (1986)
- Indiana Jones and the Last Crusade (1989)
- Double X: The Name of the Game (1992)
- Ashes to Ashes (British TV series) (2009)
- Harry and Paul (2010)
- The First Men in the Moon (2010)
- Foyle's War (Lesson in Murder)
- Bridget Jones: The Edge of Reason (film) (Pig report scene, filmed at Stockers Farm)
- Dick Turpin (Starring Richard O'Sullivan, filmed at Stockers Farm)
- Genevieve (Genevieve 'broke down' at the top of Batchworth Hill, by the gates to Moor Park)
- Metro-land (Television documentary) (1973)
- Doctor Who ('The Three Doctors' – 10th anniversary story 1972/1973)
- Harry Enfield's Television Programme (1990-1992)
- New Tricks (2014)
- Children of Men (2006)
- Silent Witness (2013)
- Doctor Foster (2015 and 2017; filming took place in Green Lane, Croxley Green)
- The Professionals (TV series) Harefield Road & Springwell Lock
- 28 Weeks Later (2007) Stockers Farm
- Endeavour (TV series) 2019 Stockers Farm

== Notable people ==
- Cardinal Wolsey (Manor of the More, 1522–1530)
- Robert Carey, 1st Earl of Monmouth (Moor Park, 1631–1639, buried at Rickmansworth Parish Church)
- Francis Russell, 2nd Earl of Bedford (Moor Park, 1576)
- Edward Russell, 3rd Earl of Bedford (Moor Park, 1585–1627)
- William Herbert, 3rd Earl of Pembroke (Moor Park, 1627)
- Franklin baronets (bought Moor Park and Manor of Rickmansworth, 1655)
- Henry Carey, 2nd Earl of Monmouth (buried at Rickmansworth Parish Church)
- James Butler, 1st Duke of Ormonde (Moor Park, 1664)
- Thomas Butler, 6th Earl of Ossory (made Lord Butler of Moore Park in 1666)
- William E. Fairbairn (developed hand-to-hand combat methods)
- James Scott, 1st Duke of Monmouth (illegitimate son of Charles II, Moor Park, 1670 - executed 1685)
- George Anson, 1st Baron Anson (Admiral Lord Anson, Moor Park c. 1752)
- Sir Lawrence Dundas, 1st Baronet (Moor Park, 1763)
- William Penn (founder of Pennsylvania)
- Thomas Dundas, 1st Baron Dundas (Moor Park, sold 1785)
- Robert Grosvenor, 1st Marquess of Westminster (Moor Park, 1828–1845)
- Robert Grosvenor, 1st Baron Ebury (Moor Park, 1846 and The Bury, 1879 to 1893)
- Robert Grosvenor, 2nd Baron Ebury (Moor Park, 1893–1918)
- Harvey Fellows (cricketer)
- Guy Calthrop aka Sir Calthrop Guy Spencer Calthrop, 1st Baronet (26 March 1870 – 23 February 1919)
- Alice Hayes (1657–1720), English Quaker preacher and autobiographer
- David Urquhart (MP, Russophile and advocate for Victorian Turkish baths)
- George Eliot (pen-name of Mary Anne Evans – The Elms, 1875)
- Val Doonican (resided in The Drive, Rickmansworth)
- Sam Little (golfer)
- Barbara Woodhouse (dog trainer, author, horse trainer and television personality)
- William Stanier (locomotive designer and Chief Mechanical Engineer of the London, Midland and Scottish Railway.)

== See also ==
- W. H. Walker and Brothers

== Sources ==
- Population figures (PDF)
- William Page, ed. (1908). "Parishes: Rickmansworth". A History of the County of Hertford: volume 2. Institute of Historical Research.
