= List of Sites of Special Scientific Interest in Hertfordshire =

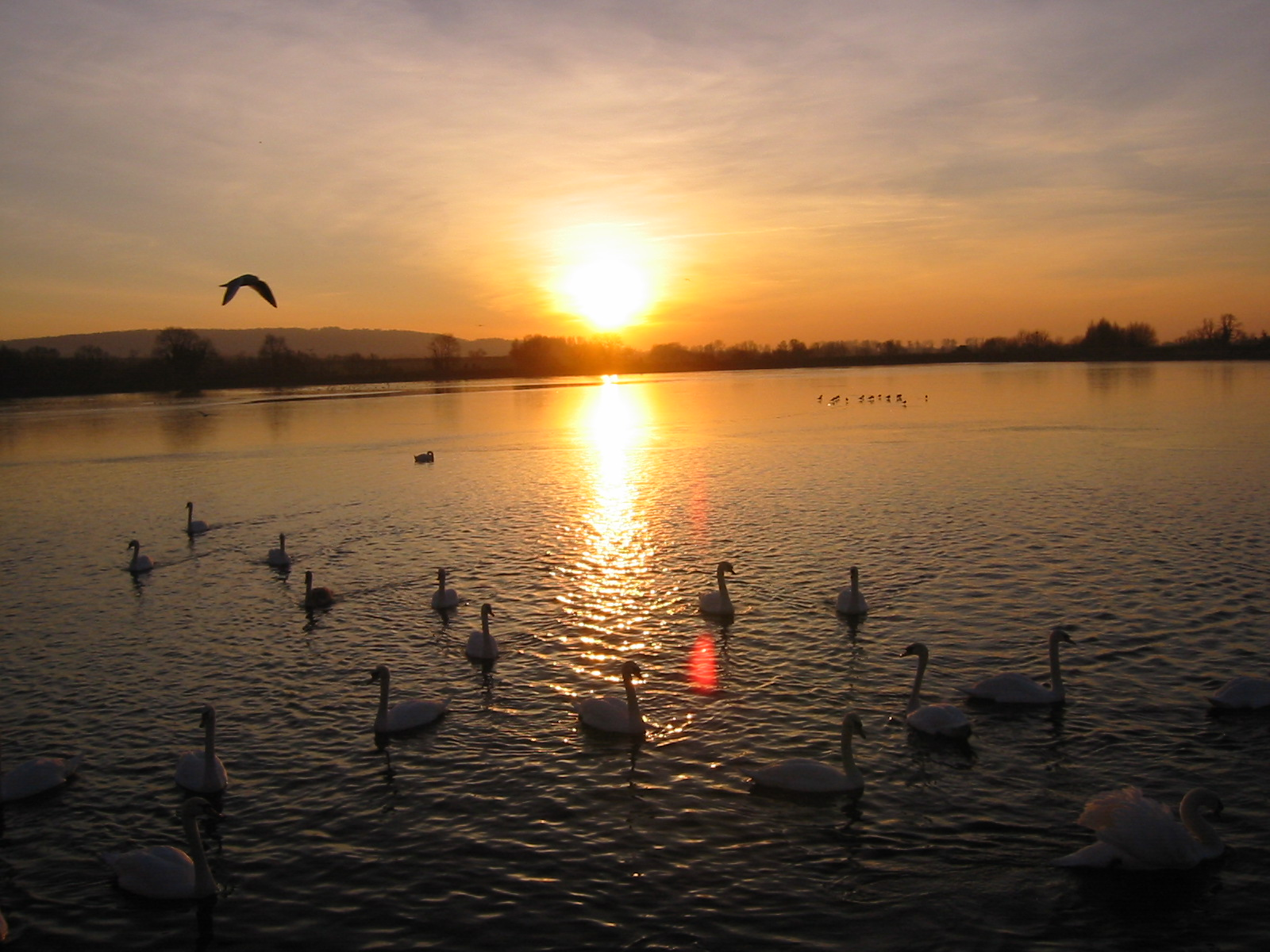
Tring Reservoirs at sunrise

Hertfordshire is a county in eastern England. It is bordered by Bedfordshire to the north, Cambridgeshire to the north-east, Essex to the east, Buckinghamshire to the west and Greater London to the south. The county town is Hertford. As of 2018, the county has a population of 1,184,400 in an area of 634 square miles (1,640 km^{2}).

As of July 2019, there are 43 sites designated within this Area of Search, 36 of which have been designated for their biological interest and 7 for their geological interest. In England the body responsible for designating SSSIs is Natural England, which chooses a site "because of its flora, fauna, or geological or physiographical features".

== Key ==
=== Interest ===
- B = a site of biological interest
- G = a site of geological interest

=== Other classifications ===
- CAONB = Chilterns Area of Outstanding Natural Beauty
- GCR = Geological Conservation Review
- EWT = Essex Wildlife Trust
- HMWT = Herts and Middlesex Wildlife Trust
- LNR = Local nature reserve
- NCR = A Nature Conservation Review
- NNR = National nature reserve
- NT = National Trust
- Ramsar = Ramsar site
- RHPG = Register of Historic Parks and Gardens of Special Historic Interest in England
- RSPB = Royal Society for the Protection of Birds
- SM = Scheduled monument
- SPA = Special Protection Area
- WT = Woodland Trust

== Sites ==
Site name	Photograph	B	G	Area (Note: Maps and citations for each site are taken from the Natural England database. The area and location of the site is shown on the citation. The listing is as in January 2016.)	Public access	Location	Other classifications	Map	Citation	Description
Aldbury Nowers	Aldbury Nowers	✓		19.8 hectares (49 acres)	YES	Tring; 51.8120°N 0.6219°W; SP951135	HMWT	Map	Citation	The site hosts the flowers of chalk grassland and has butterfly habitats with several different species of butterfly including the Duke of Burgundy, hairstreaks and the Essex skipper. There are also large areas of woodland and calcareous grassland.
Alpine Meadow	Alpine Meadow	✓		0.8 hectares (2.0 acres)	YES	Berkhamsted; 51.7826°N 0.5677°W; SP989103	HMWT	Map	Citation	This steeply sloping small meadow is a rare example of unimproved chalk grassland. Grass species include upright brome, false brome and sheep's fescue, and there are many orchids, especially common twayblade and common spotted orchid.
Amwell Quarry	Amwell Quarry	✓		37.1 hectares (92 acres)	YES	Great Amwell; 51.7978°N 0.0045°W; TL377129	HMWT, SPA, SPA Ramsar	Map	Citation	This is an internationally important site for wintering wildfowl, and is Britain's most important site for dragonflies. Plants include marsh dock and hairlike pondweed, both nationally rare. Amwell has a quarter of all British species of molluscs.
Ashridge Commons & Woods	Pitstone Common	✓		627.3 hectares (1,550 acres)	YES	Little Gaddesden; 51.8116°N 0.5871°W; SP975135	CAONB, NT	Map	Citation	Ths site is mainly semi-natural vegetation, with has extensive areas of woodland, grass and scrub. There are many species of breeding birds, including some which are rare nationally, such as firecrests. Other species which are rare in Hertfordshire are common redstart, nightingale and wood warbler.
Ashwell Springs	Ashwell Springs	✓		0.3 hectares (0.74 acres)	YES	Ashwell; 52.0421°N 0.1497°W; TL270398		Map	Citation	The site consists of a series of freshwater springs, which provide a habitat for cold water, invertebrate animals, some of which are rare. The site is particularly important for flatworms, including Crenobia alpina and the Polycelis felina.
Benington High Wood	Benington High Wood	✓		20.7 hectares (51 acres)	YES	Benington; 51.8952°N 0.1339°W; TL285235		Map	Citation	The site is ancient woodland, described by Natural England as "one of the best remaining examples in the county of the pedunculate oak-hornbeam of the ash-maple variety". Shrub species include field maple and hazel, with a higher ground flora diversity in clearings and rides.
Blagrove Common	Blagrove Common	✓		5.0 hectares (12 acres)	YES	Sandon; 51.9868°N 0.0704°W; TL326338	HMWT	Map	Citation	The site is one of the few areas of unimproved marshy grassland in east Hertfordshire. It is crossed by a stream and has a rich diversity of vegetation, including a variety of orchids. Kestrels often hunt mice and voles, which are common on the site.
Bricket Wood Common	Bricket Wood Common	✓		75.5 hectares (187 acres)	YES	Bricket Wood; 51.6964°N 0.3664°W; TL130010		Map	Citation	The common is a remnant of a lowland heath, with much it on the heavy soils of boulder clay which have poor drainage and wet habitats. There are also areas of ancient woodland and dry heath. In drier heath areas there are heather, purple moor-grass and heath milkwort.
Castle Lime Works Quarry	Castle Lime Works Quarry		✓	1.4 hectares (3.5 acres)	NO	South Mimms; 51.7087°N 0.2227°W; TL229026	GCR	Map	Citation	Natural England states: "This reveals extensive piping in the top of the chalk resulting from solution at the Chalk - Tertiary sediment interface. Believed to have formed during the Tertiary and Pleistocene, it is the finest exposure of clay-filled pipes in the Chalk Karst of England."
Croxley Common Moor	Croxley Common Moor	✓		39.6 hectares (98 acres)	YES	Croxley Green; 51.6425°N 0.4363°W; TQ083949	LNR	Map	Citation	The site is mainly grass heathland with some ancient woodland and hazel coppice. Over 250 species of plants have been recorded, including sheep sorrel, common bent and sheep's fescue. There are many ant hills made by yellow meadow ants.
Downfield Pit, Westmill	Downfield Pit		✓	0.3 hectares (0.74 acres)	YES	Ware; 51.8308°N 0.0437°W; TL349165		Map	Citation	The site provides an example of the complex sequence of Pleistocene gravels and clays laid down by the River Thames when it flowed through the Vale of St Albans before the river was diverted south by the Anglian ice age around 450,000 years ago.
Frogmore Meadows	Frogmore Meadows	✓		4.6 hectares (11 acres)	YES	Chenies; 51.6796°N 0.5247°W; TQ021989	CAONB, HMWT,	Map	Citation	The site has marshy areas and fens next to the river, damp grassland and drier, more acidic areas. The river bank has water voles, and damp areas are dominated by meadow foxtail and Yorkshire fog, with some marsh marigold and marsh bedstraw.
Great Hormead Park	Great Hormead Park	✓		15.0 hectares (37 acres)	YES	Great Hormead; 51.9432°N 0.0616°E; TL418292		Map	Citation	The site is coppiced ancient woodland on boulder clay. It has diverse tree species, including wych elm and hornbeam, resulting in a rich ground flora. Dog's mercury is dominant over most of the woodland floor, with plants such as angelica sylvestris and tufted hair grass in wetter areas.
Hertford Heath	Hertford Heath	✓		29.1 hectares (72 acres)	YES	Hertford Heath; 51.7813°N 0.0372°W; TL355110 & TL350106	HMWT	Map	Citation	The heath is dominated by heather, and there are grass snakes and slow worms. Sphagnum mosses and creeping willow are found in wetter areas. Ponds support the rare water violet and a rich invertebrate fauna such as great crested and smooth newts, the water spider and eight species of dragonfly.
Hillcollins Pit	Hillcollins Pit		✓	0.2 hectares (0.49 acres)	YES	Furneux Pelham; 51.9211°N 0.0954°E; TL442268	GCR	Map	Citation	This disused gravel pit is the type site for the Westland Green Gravels, which were laid down by the ancestral River Thames 1.6 to 1.8 million years ago, and which show the river's ancient course.
Hunsdon Mead	Hunsdon Mead	✓		34.2 hectares (85 acres)	YES	Harlow; 51.7797°N 0.0541°E; TL418110	HMWT	Map	Citation	This is unimproved grassland which is subject to winter flooding. Notable grass species include meadow brome and the quaking grass briza media, and there are other unusual flora such as pepper saxifrage and green-winged orchid.
Knebworth Woods	Knebworth Woods	✓		128.8 hectares (318 acres)	YES	Stevenage; 51.8857°N 0.2172°W; TL228223		Map	Citation	The wood is ancient in origin and ecologically diverse. The dominant trees are oak and hornbeam. Ponds have unusual plant species, and the site is rich in fungi and bryophytes. Breeding birds include nightingales.
Little Heath Pit	Little Heath Pit		✓	1.2 hectares (3.0 acres)	YES	Potten End; 51.7633°N 0.5278°W; TL017082	GCR, NT	Map	Citation	The lowest layer is gravel dating to the beginning of the Pleistocene 2.6 million years ago. A higher layer of gravel was laid down some 20,000 years ago, when the last ice age was at its maximum, and the site was cold tundra like western Siberia today.
Moor Hall Meadows	Moor Hall Meadows	✓		24.0 hectares (59 acres)	YES	Ardeley; 51.9211°N 0.0674°W; TL330265		Map	Citation	The site has a variety of types of meadows, with marshy grassland being the most extensive. Its rich flora makes it one of the most important grassland sites in the county. There is also a small ancient woodland which has a variety of breeding birds.
Moor Mill Quarry, West	Moor Mill Quarry		✓	0.2 hectares (0.49 acres)	NO	How Wood; 51.7119°N 0.3506°W; TL141027	GCR	Map	Citation	The pit displays the advance of ice during the Anglian glaciation around 450,000 years ago, which diverted the Thames south to its present course. The site is regarded by Natural England as of fundamental importance as the only one which demonstrates the diversion of the Thames from its pre-Anglian course.
Northaw Great Wood	Northaw Great Wood	✓		224.3 hectares (554 acres)	YES	Cuffley; 51.7228°N 0.1483°W; TL280043	LNR	Map	Citation	The site has one of the county's most extensive areas of ancient hornbeam woodland, with other trees including oak and silver birch. Glades, streams and springs add to the biodiversity.
Oddy Hill and Tring Park	Tring Park	✓		36.0 hectares (89 acres)	YES	Tring; 51.7890°N 0.6473°W; SP934109; 51.7837°N 0.6561°W; SP928103	RHPG.	Map	Citation	This is one of the most extensive areas of unimproved chalk downland in Hertfordshire. The site has diverse grass and flowering plant species. Orchids include common spotted-orchid, common twayblade, greater butterfly-orchid and southern marsh-orchid.
Oughtonhead Lane	Oughtonhead Lane		✓	1.0 hectare (2.5 acres)	YES	Hitchin; 51.9552°N 0.2959°W; TL172299	GCR	Map	Citation	The site probably dates to the Hoxnian interglacial 420,000 to 300,000 years ago. It was then a marsh fed by springs, and it has a tufa which contains fossil land snails and mammal bones which show the climate and local environmental conditions.
Patmore Heath	Patmore Heath	✓		8.5 hectares (21 acres)	YES	Albury; 51.9120°N 0.0965°E; TL443258	HMWT	Map	Citation	The site is home to a large amount of dry grass, as well as marshy-areas. Much of the turf is dominated by Deschampsia, as well as occurrences of Anthoxanthum odoratum. Uncommon plants are heath rush and heath grass. There are a wide variety of dragonfly, including the emperor dragonfly.
Plashes Wood	Plashes Wood	✓		73.2 hectares (181 acres)	YES	Standon; 51.8669°N 0.0058°E; TL382206		Map	Citation	The site is mainly oak and hornbeam woodland near the northern limit of its natural distribution. It has varied ground flora on soils from damp heavy clay to light gravels. There are also ponds and extensive clearings dominated by bracken, and other flora including hoary cinquefoil.
Redwell Wood	Redwell Wood	✓		52.6 hectares (130 acres)	YES	South Mimms; 51.7081°N 0.2459°W; TL213025		Map	Citation	The site has ancient and secondary woodland, heath and scrub. The woodland canopy is dominated by pedunculate oak. Ground flora include bluebells and enchanter's-nightshade, while heathland species include heather and the rare creeping willow.
Roughdown Common	Roughdown Common	✓		3.7 hectares (9.1 acres)	YES	Hemel Hempstead; 51.7402°N 0.4850°W; TL047057	CAONB	Map	Citation	This is one of the few examples of unimproved calcareous grassland in Hertfordshire. The dominant grasses are meadow fescue and meadow oat-grass, and there are colonies of orchids. It is the only site in the county where common juniper regenerates naturally.
Rye Meads	Rye Meads	✓		60.3 hectares (149 acres)	YES	Rye House; 51.7760°N 0.0061°E; TL385105	Ramsar, SPA RSPB, HMWT	Map	Citation	Part of this site is an ancient flood meadow which has a variety of habitats including reedbed, marshy grassland and fen. It is grazed by ponies and water buffalo. There are also ponds which have kingfisher, snipe, green sandpiper, shoveler, gadwall and tufted duck.
Sarratt Bottom	Sarratt Bottom	✓		3.5 hectares (8.6 acres)	NO	Sarratt; 51.6794°N 0.5102°W; TQ031989		Map	Citation	The site is a meadow beside the River Chess. It is an example of damp grassland which has been traditionally managed for grazing. There are also areas of swamp and marsh. The main plants in grassland areas include sweet vernal grass and meadow foxtail, and marsh horsetail and common spike-rush are common in damper areas.
Sawbridgeworth Marsh	Sawbridgeworth Marsh	✓		6.2 hectares (15 acres)	YES	Sawbridgeworth; 51.8209°N 0.1634°E; TL492158	EWT	Map	Citation	The site is a river valley marsh close to the River Stort, which has a varied wetland flora. Grazing and cutting of the marsh in rotation maintain biological diversity. The site also has an important wetland fauna and many moth species.
Sherrardspark Wood	Sherrardspark Wood	✓		74.4 hectares (184 acres)	YES	Welwyn Garden City; 51.8102°N 0.2172°W; TL230139	LNR	Map	Citation	The site is an ancient semi-natural sessile oak and hornbeam wood on acid soils. There are also swallowholes fed by streams, and a woodland ride provides a habitat for invertebrates.
Tewinbury	Tewinbury	✓		7.3 hectares (18 acres)	NO	Tewin; 51.8095°N 0.1679°W; TL264139	HMWT	Map	Citation	The site borders the River Mimram. It has alluvial meadows and marshes which are rare in lowland Britain. There are areas of swamp and tall fens, with plants including butterbur and angelica. Otters have been observed on the riverbank, in possibly the only site in the county.
Therfield Heath	Therfield Heath	✓		146.5 hectares (362 acres)	YES	Therfield; 52.0423°N 0.0549°W; TL335400	LNR, SM	Map	Citation	This site is described by Natural England as describing some to the richest chalkland in England. It is unimproved pasture which has a wide variety of plants including the rare pasque flower. There is a diverse insect fauna.
Thorley Flood Pound	Thorley Flood Pound	✓		17.3 hectares (43 acres)	YES	Thorley; 51.8434°N 0.1615°E; TL490183	HMWT	Map	Citation	Habitats include tall wash grassland, which is now rare, marsh and waterlogged grassland. It has a wide variety of plant species, including reed sweet-grass and meadowsweet. There are flowers such as fen bedstraw and early marsh orchid. Breeding birds include snipe and water rails.
Tring Reservoirs	Tring Reservoirs	✓		100.0 hectares (247 acres)	YES	Tring; 51.8135°N 0.6683°W; SP919136; SP905131	HMWT	Map	Citation	These four reservoirs are on the sites of ancient marshes, and their diverse fauna and flora include some dating back to their marshland origins. The site is important for breeding and wintering birds, including nationally important numbers of shovelers. The site is also significant for invertebrates.
Tring Woodlands	Tring Woodlands	✓		24.1 hectares (60 acres)	YES	Tring; 51.7812°N 0.6721°W; SP917100	CAONB	Map	Citation	The wood has a rich flora, showing that it is well established. It is one of the best examples of semi-natural beech woodland in Hertfordshire. Plants include woodruff, wood anemone and dog's mercury, and there is a variety of woodland birds.
Turnford and Cheshunt Pits	Cheshunt Pit	✓		174.4 hectares (431 acres)	YES	Cheshunt; 51.7090°N 0.0186°W; TL370030	SPA	Map	Citation	This site includes ten former gravel pits, which are of national importance for wintering gadwalls and shovelers. It is also valuable for invertebrates, especially grasshoppers and bush-crickets.
Wain Wood	Wain Wood	✓		19.0 hectares (47 acres)	YES	Preston; 51.9155°N 0.2858°W; TL180255		Map	Citation	The wood lies on a north-east facing slope of decalcified boulder clay. The woodland area is also home to pedunculate oak and Quercus petraea, with much of the south of the area consisting of acidic grassland. There are many butterfly species, including Thecla quercus.
Water End Swallow Holes	Water End Swallow Holes	✓		11.1 hectares (27 acres)	YES	Welham Green; 51.7239°N 0.2206°W; TL230043		Map	Citation	The site covers more than fifteen sinkholes, the only ones in chalk which are a permanent feature of the landscape. Next to the holes is a swamp area of willow carr which is biologically important, and in deep water there is reed sweet-grass. The site also has areas of woodland and grassland.
Westwood Quarry	Westwood Quarry		✓	0.1 hectares (0.25 acres)	NO	Watford; 51.6823°N 0.4523°W; TQ071993	GCR	Map	Citation	This site throws light on the early history of the River Thames, when it flowed through the Vale of St Albans, before it was diverted south to its present course during the Anglian Ice Age around 450,000 years ago.
Whippendell Wood	Whippendell Wood	✓		66.7 hectares (165 acres)	YES	Watford; 51.6687°N 0.4455°W; TQ076978		Map	Citation	This is ancient woodland, and the main trees are oak, ash, hazel and hornbeam. Ground flora include Yorkshire fog, bluebells and honeysuckle. There are diverse species of fungi, invertebrates and birds.
Wormley-Hoddesdonpark Wood North	Hoddesdonpark Wood	✓		143.9 hectares (356 acres)	YES	Hoddesdon; 51.7589°N 0.0425°W; TL352085; TL325075	NNR, WT, NCR, HMWT, SAC	Map	Citation	The site is oak and hornbeam on acid gravel. The ground flora is diverse, including dog's mercury and yellow archangel. Small ponds and streams are important for bryophytes, and invertebrates include the green tiger beetle.
Wormley-Hoddesdonpark Wood South	Wormley-Hoddesdonpark Wood South	✓		196.2 hectares (485 acres)	YES	Cheshunt; 51.7441°N 0.0735°W; TL331068	NNR, NCR, SAC	Map	Citation	The site is oak and hornbeam woodland mainly on London clay. Plants in the variable ground flora include brambles, wood anemones and bluebells. Other habitats include marshland and acidic grassland.

== See also ==
- Herts and Middlesex Wildlife Trust
- List of Local Nature Reserves in Hertfordshire
