= Danemead =

Nature reserve in Hertfordshire, England

Coordinates: 51.752267°N 0.050737°W

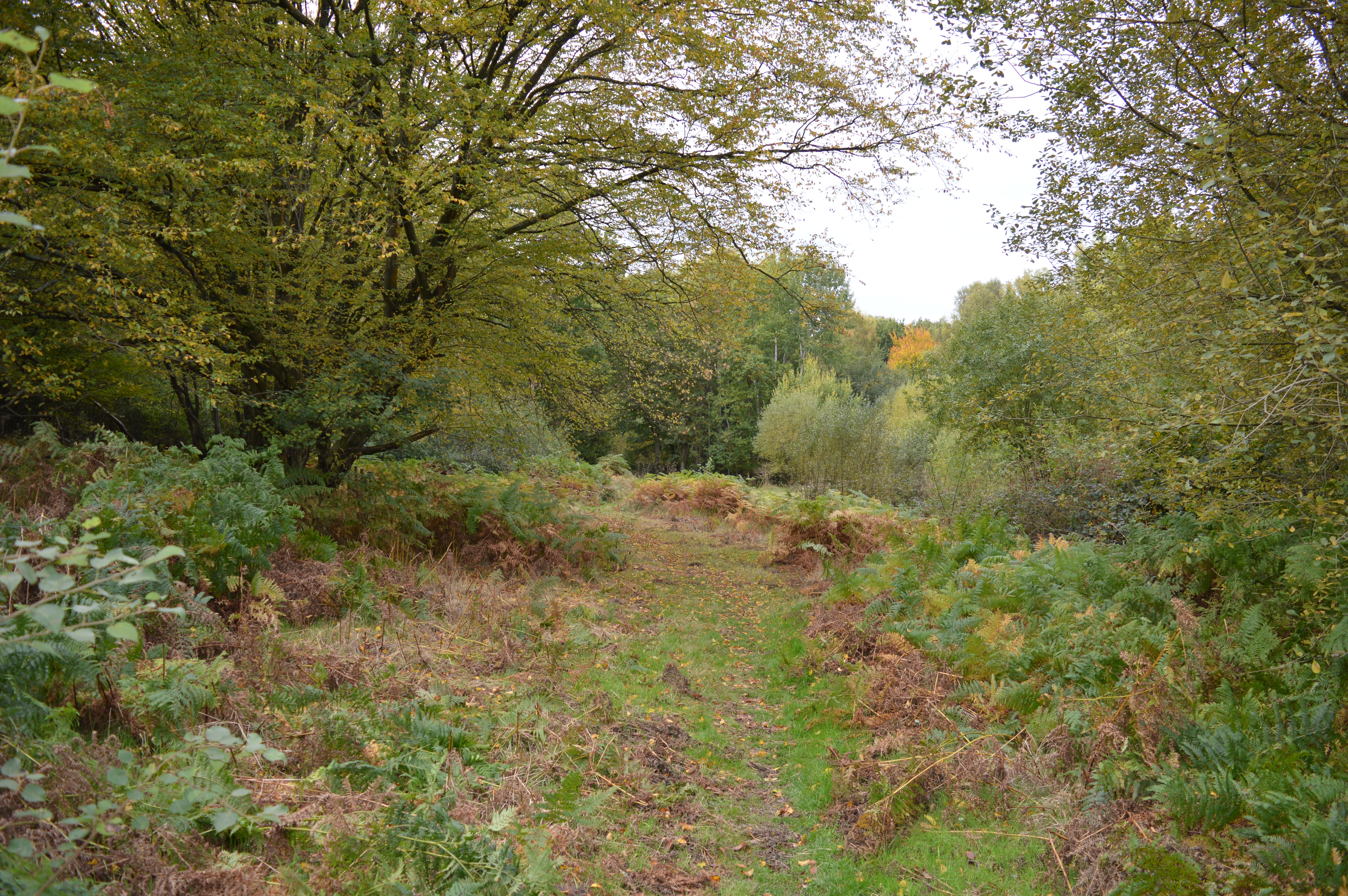

Danemead is a 5.6-hectare nature reserve west of Hoddesdon in Hertfordshire, managed by the Herts and Middlesex Wildlife Trust. It is part of the Wormley-Hoddesdonpark Wood North Site of Special Scientific Interest. (Note: The site noticeboard states that it is part of the Broxbourne Woods National Nature Reserve, but according to the Natural England map of Broxbourne Woods this is incorrect.)

The site has hornbeam woodland, damp acid grassland, a stream, scrub and valley mire. There are many butterflies and wild flowers, including meadowsweet and devil's-bit scabious.

The entrance is on a section of Ermine Street, formerly a major Roman road and now a bridleway. Access is from the Ermine Street carpark on Cock Lane. There is a gate on Cock Lane to a private estate called Danemead Scout Campsite which is closed to the public, and the nature reserve is behind the private estate.
