= Bricket Wood Common =

Protected area in Hertfordshire, England

Coordinates: 51.6964°N 0.3664°W

- Site of Special Scientific Interest
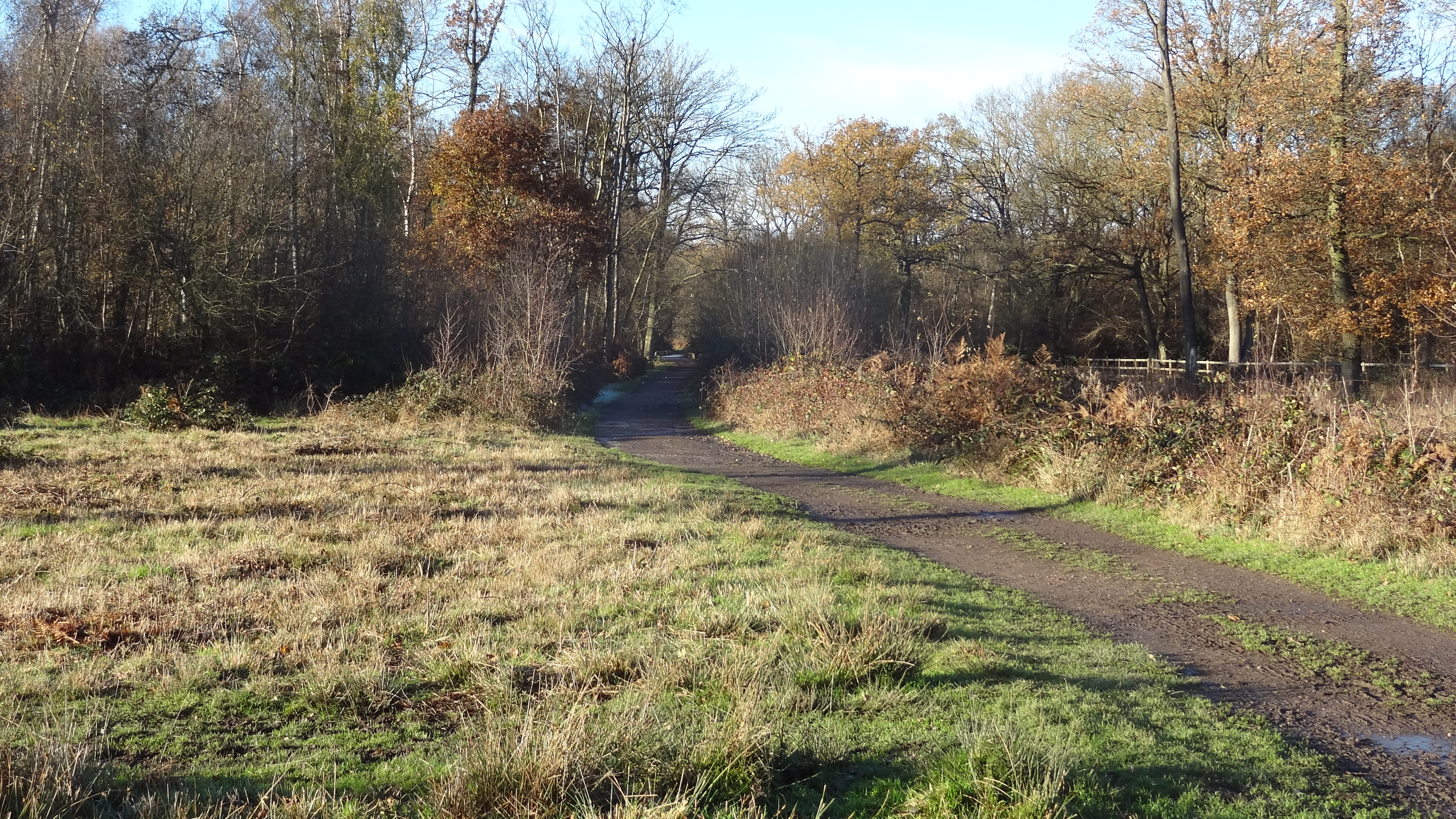
- Path in Bricket Wood Common
- Location of Bricket Wood Common.
- Area of search: Hertfordshire
- Grid reference: TL385105
- Interest: Biological
- Area: 70.0 ha (173 acres)
- Notification date: 1984
- Location map: Magic Map

Bricket Wood Common is a 70 hectare open space and biological Site of Special Scientific Interest in Bricket Wood in Hertfordshire. It is managed by St Albans City and District Council together with the Countryside Management Service and Bricket Wood Joint Management Committee.

The common is a remnant of a lowland heath, with much it on the heavy soils of boulder clay with poor drainage and wet habitats. There are also areas of ancient woodland and dry heath. The woodland canopy is mainly oak and silver birch with a shrub layer of hornbeam and hazel. Lowland heath flora include sphagnum in the wetter areas and there are several small ponds. In drier heath areas there are heather, purple moor-grass and heath milkwort.

The common is divided by the Abbey Line railway. There is access from Mount Pleasant Lane, Bucknalls Drive and School Lane.

== See also ==
- List of Sites of Special Scientific Interest in Hertfordshire
