= Plashes Wood =

Protected area in Hertfordshire, England

Coordinates: 51.8669°N 0.0058°E

- Site of Special Scientific Interest
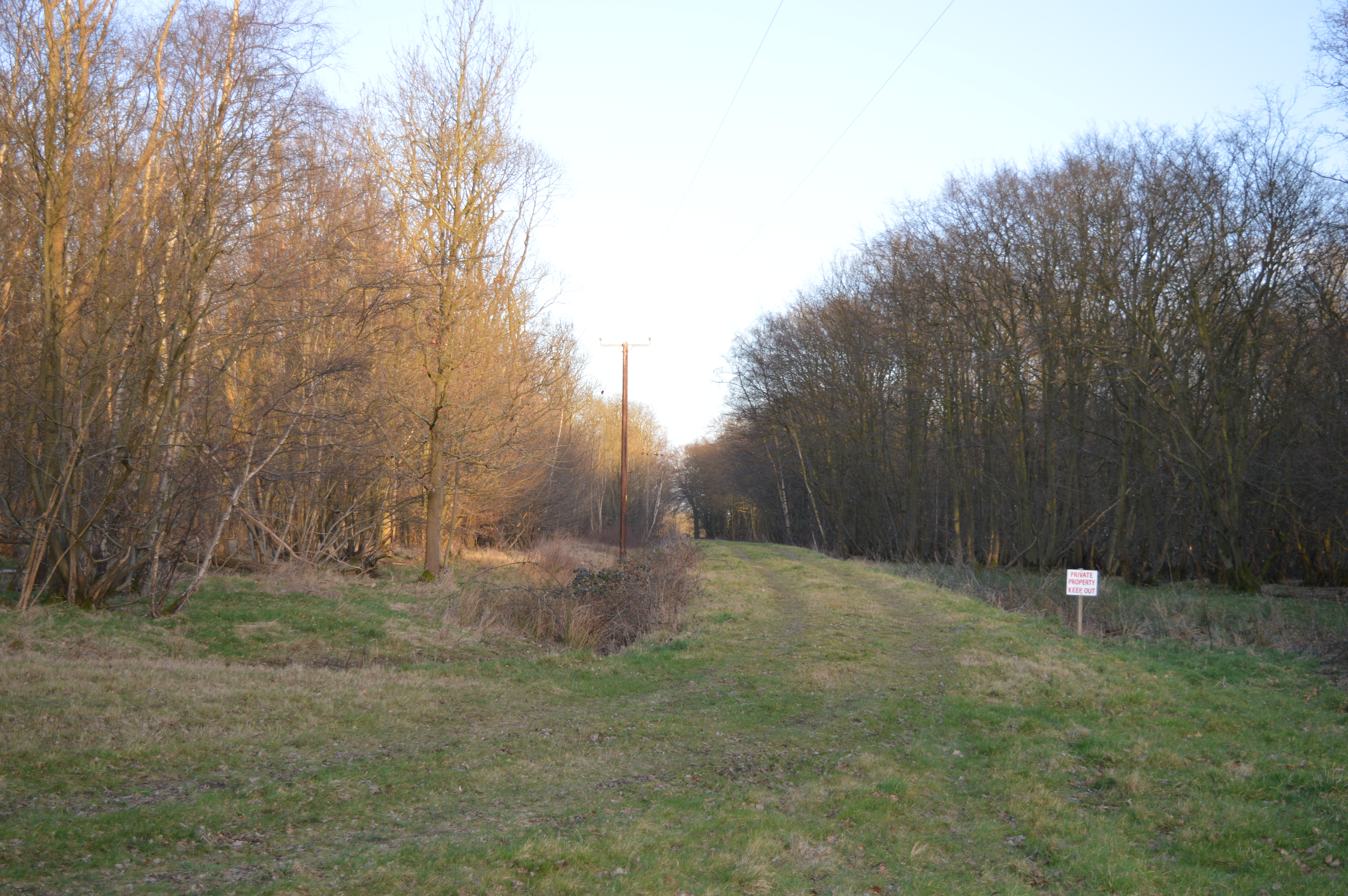
- Location of Plashes Wood.
- Area of search: Hertfordshire
- Grid reference: TL349165
- Interest: Biological
- Area: 19.7 ha (49 acres)
- Notification date: 1984
- Location map: Magic Map

Plashes Wood is a 71.9-hectare (178-acre) biological Site of Special Scientific Interest south of Standon in Hertfordshire. The local planning authority is East Hertfordshire District Council. The wood is private property.

The site is mainly oak and hornbeam woodland near the northern limit of its natural distribution. It has varied ground flora on soils from damp heavy clay to light gravels. Common plants include bramble, bluebells and dog's mercury. There are also ponds and extensive clearings dominated by bracken, and other flora including hoary cinquefoil.

There is access from a footpath next to Colliers End church in Ermine Street.
