= Castle Lime Works Quarry =

Site of Special Scientific Interest in England

Coordinates: 51.70868°N 0.22268°W

- Site of Special Scientific Interest
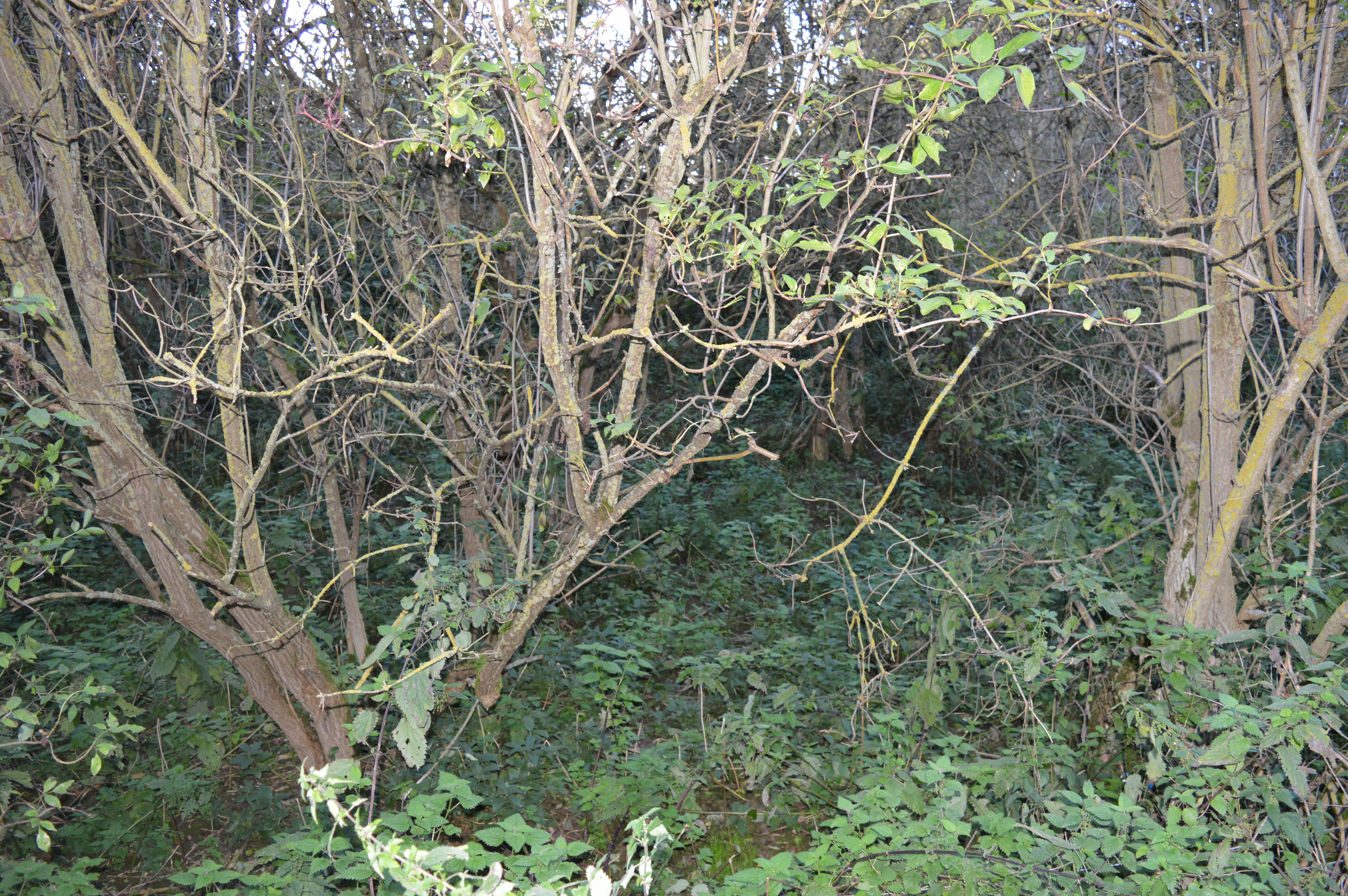
- Location of Castle Lime Works Quarry.
- Area of search: Hertfordshire
- Grid reference: TL229026
- Interest: Geological
- Area: 1.6 ha (4.0 acres)
- Notification date: 1986
- Location map: Magic Map

Castle Lime Works Quarry is a 1.6 hectares (4.0 acres) geological Site of Special Scientific Interest near South Mimms in Hertfordshire. The site was notified in 1986 under the Wildlife and Countryside Act 1981. The site is a disused chalk quarry and according to Natural England:

This reveals extensive piping in the top of the chalk resulting from solution at the Chalk - Tertiary sediment interface. Believed to have formed during the Tertiary and Pleistocene, it is the finest exposure of clay-filled pipes in the Chalk Karst of England.

The site is on private land and there is no public access.

== See also ==
- List of Sites of Special Scientific Interest in Hertfordshire
