= Westwood Quarry =

Geological site of Special Scientific Interest in United Kingdom

Coordinates: 51.68226°N 0.45227°W

- Site of Special Scientific Interest
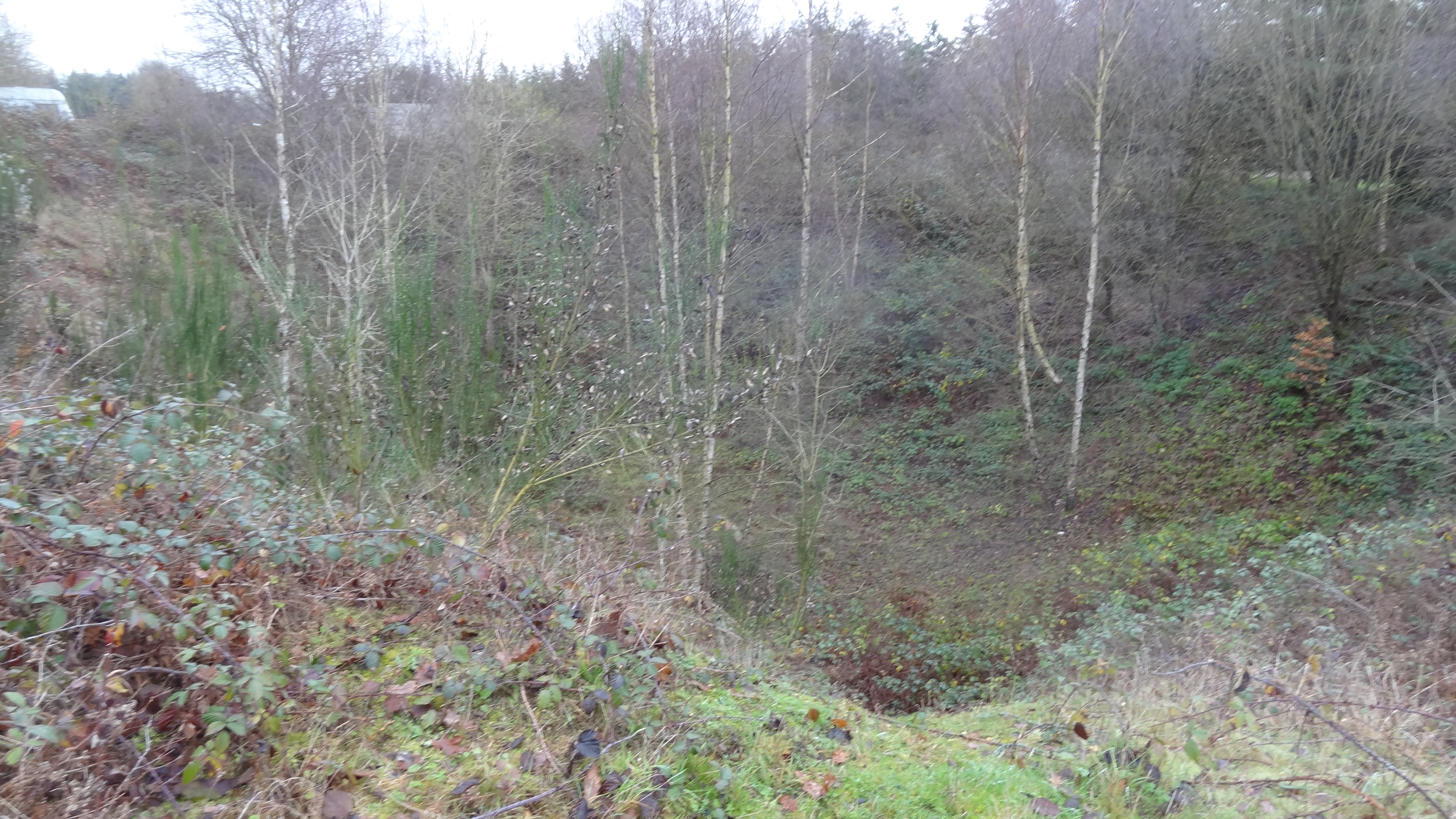
- Location of Westwood Quarry.
- Area of search: Hertfordshire
- Grid reference: TQ071993
- Interest: Geological
- Area: 0.07 ha (0.17 acres)
- Notification date: 1987
- Location map: Magic Map

Westwood Quarry is a 0.07 hectares (0.17 acres) geological site of Special Scientific Interest west of Watford in Hertfordshire. It was notified in 1987 under the Wildlife and Countryside Act 1981. The planning authority is Three Rivers District Council. It is a Geological Conservation Review site.

It is described by Natural England as a key site for the early history of the River Thames as it provides the best known exposure of the Lower Gravel Train, a deposit formed when the Thames flowed through the Vale of St Albans, before it was diverted south to its present course during the Anglian Ice Age around 450,000 years ago.

The site is privately owned with no public access.

== See also ==
- List of Sites of Special Scientific Interest in Hertfordshire
