= Wain Wood =

Woodland in Preston, Hertfordshire, England

Coordinates: 51.91554°N 0.28577°W

- Site of Special Scientific Interest
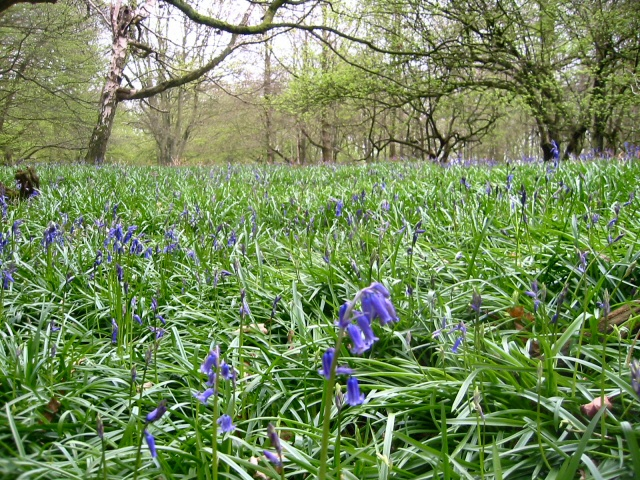
- Location of Wain Wood.
- Area of search: Preston, Hertfordshire
- Grid reference: TL180255
- Interest: Biological
- Area: 19.2 ha (47 acres)
- Notification date: 1986
- Location map: Magic Map

Wain Wood is an ancient woodland extending to 19.2 hectares (47 acres) near Preston in North Hertfordshire. The site is a Site of Special Scientific Interest, which was notified in 1986 under the Wildlife and Countryside Act 1981. The local planning authority is North Hertfordshire District Council. It is a relic of a large forest which extended from Hitchin to Hatfield.

== Description ==
Wain Wood is situated on a north-east facing slope over decalcified boulder clay. It is an example of a habitat with limited and localised distribution in the United Kingdom due to deforestation or afforestation, especially with conifers. The woodland is dominated by pedunculate oak, sessile oak, and hornbeam in the north of the site and gean to the south. At the centre of the wood is a disused pit surrounded by ash and gean. Much of the south of the area consists of acidic grassland. Wain Wood is host to a diverse butterfly fauna, including purple hairstreak and the speckled wood.

== History ==
Wain Wood's name has been associated with a site of pagan worship, but it may, more prosaically, derive from the old word for a wagon and refer to a wagon way which passed through the area. It was used by Quaker families from Hitchin for recreation, mainly the enjoyment of nature. Hornbeam was coppiced in the woodland, and the bark of the trees was collected for use in tanning. The author and Baptist preacher John Bunyan preached in Wain Wood. Sometimes the congregations in the woods would number into the thousands. Up to the 1880s, anniversary services were held in the woods to commemorate Bunyan's preaching.

There is access by a footpath from the bottom of Preston Hill.

== See also ==
- List of Sites of Special Scientific Interest in Hertfordshire
