= Knebworth Woods =

Woodland in Knebworth, Hertfordshire, England

Coordinates: 51.8857°N 0.2172°W

- Site of Special Scientific Interest
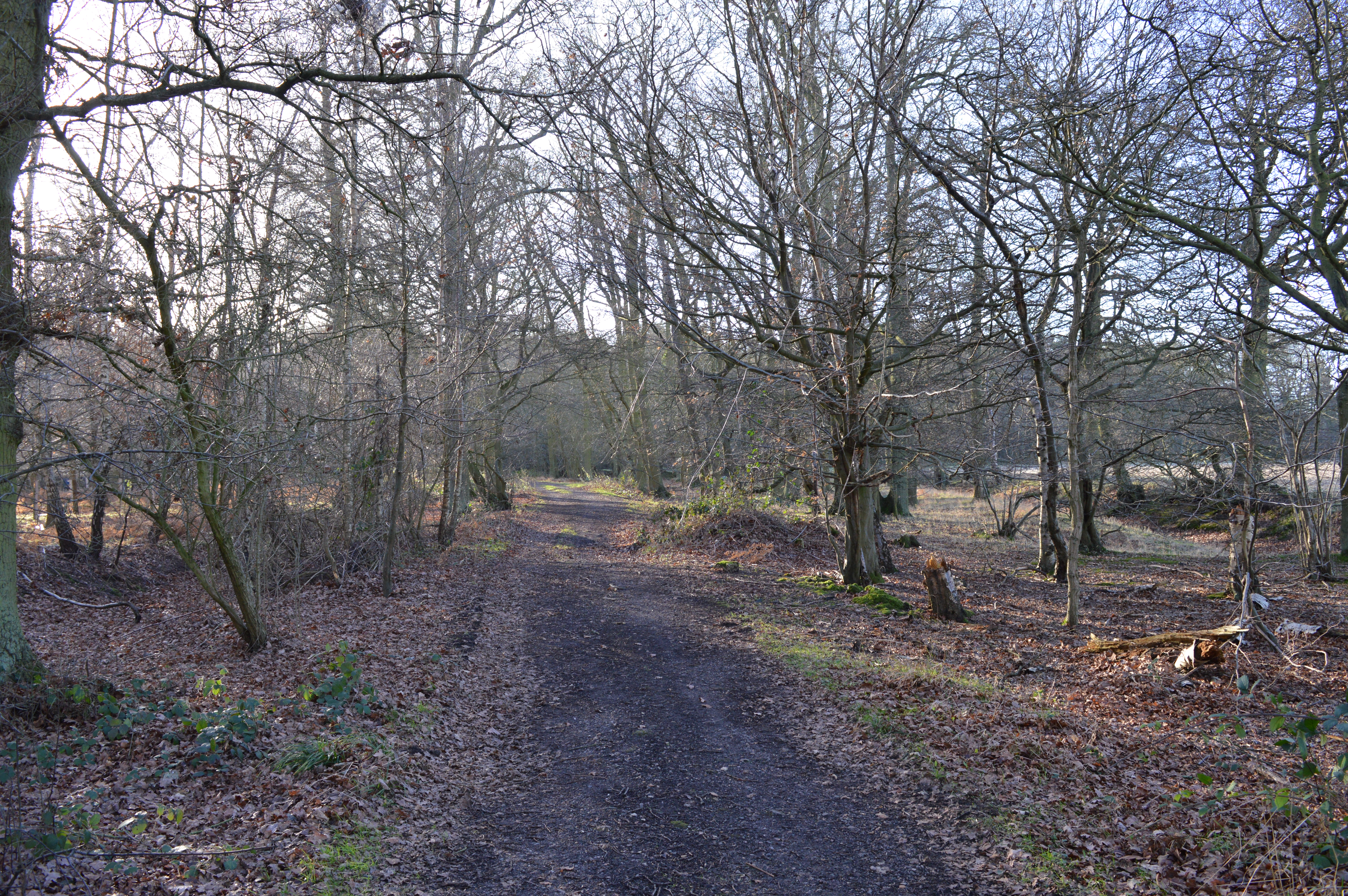
- Location of Knebworth Woods.
- Area of search: Hertfordshire
- Grid reference: TL228223
- Interest: Biological
- Area: 120.8 ha (299 acres)
- Notification date: 1985
- Location map: Magic Map

Knebworth Woods is a 120.8-hectare (299-acre) biological Site of Special Scientific Interest in Knebworth, immediately south of Stevenage in Hertfordshire. The planning authority is North Hertfordshire District Council.

The wood is ancient in origin and ecologically diverse. It is described by Natural England as "a most important woodland in the north of the county lying on poorly drained soils derived from underlying clay-with-flints". The dominant trees are oak and hornbeam. Ponds have unusual plant species, and the site is rich in fungi and bryophytes. Breeding birds include nightingales, and purple emperor butterflies have been reported in Watery Grove in the north of the site.

There is access by a footpath which is a continuation of Chadwell Road.

== See also ==
- List of Sites of Special Scientific Interest in Hertfordshire
