= Downfield Pit =

Coordinates: 51.8308°N 0.0437°W

Downfield Pit, Westmill
- Site of Special Scientific Interest
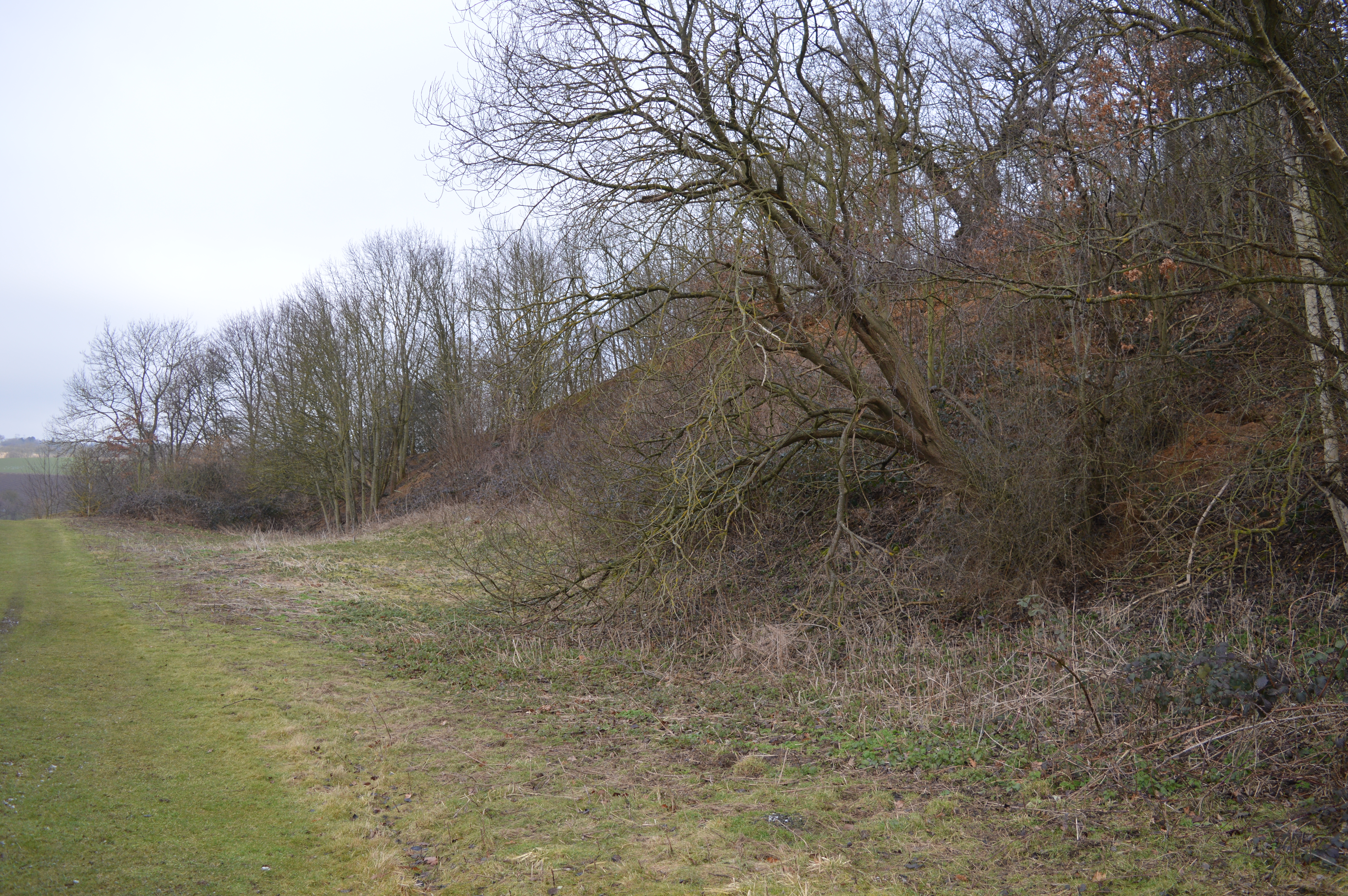
- Downfield Pit north
- Location of Downfield Pit, Westmill.
- Area of search: Hertfordshire
- Grid reference: TL349165
- Interest: Geological
- Area: 3.6 ha (8.9 acres)
- Notification date: 1989
- Location map: Magic Map

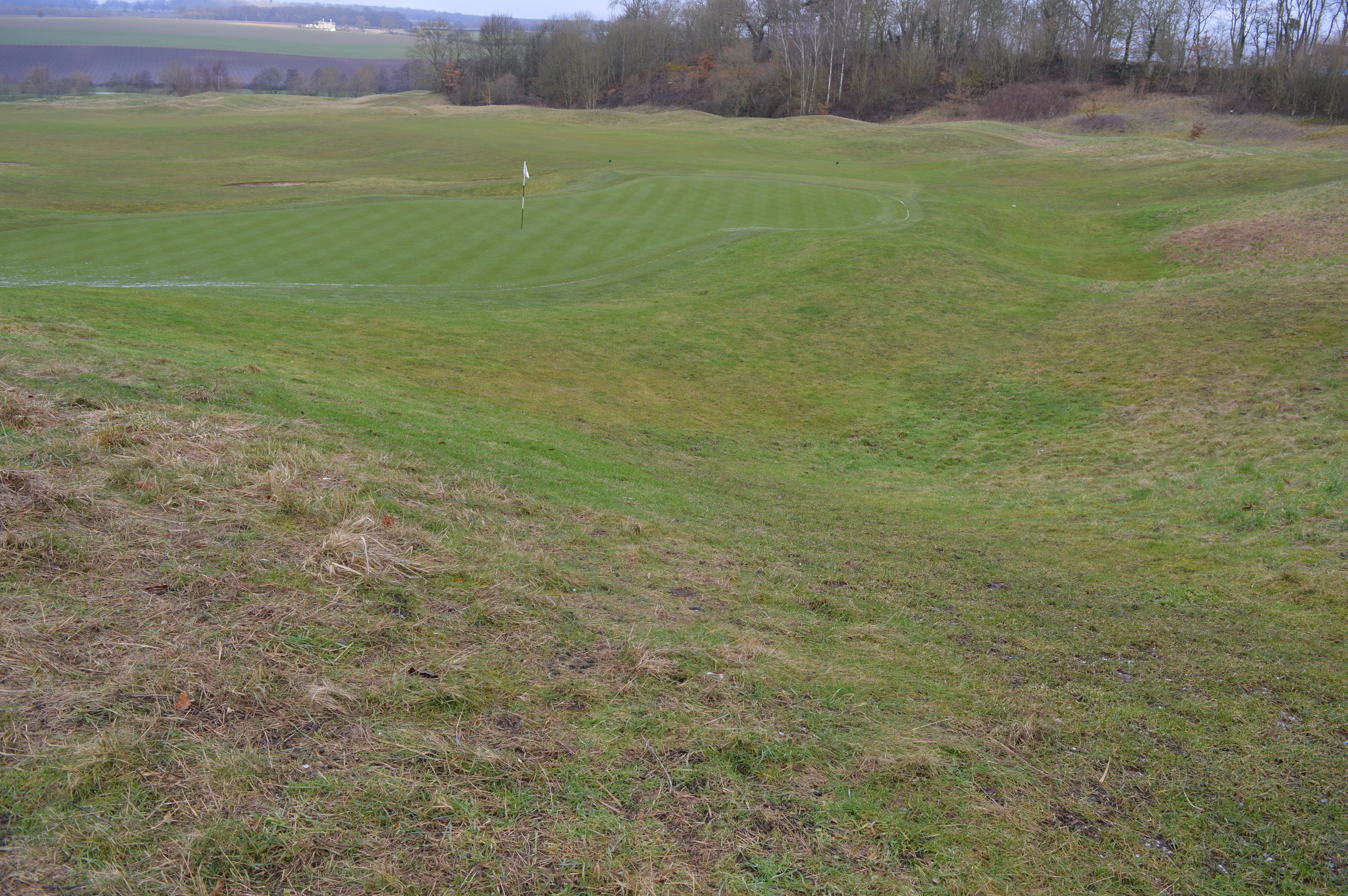
Downfield Pit south

Downfield Pit is a 3.6-hectare (8.9-acre) geological Site of Special Scientific Interest near Ware in Hertfordshire. It is in the Geological Conservation Review in the Thames Pleistocene section, and the local planning authority is East Hertfordshire District Council.

The site provides an example of the complex sequence of Pleistocene gravels and clays laid down by the River Thames when it flowed through the Vale of St Albans before the river was diverted south by the Anglian ice age around 450,000 years ago. Downfield Pit is a key site linking the Thames and East Anglia regions during the Middle Pleistocene.

The site is now very degraded, but a borehole could establish the sequence of deposits. It is in two areas, both now within the Hanbury Manor Golf Course. The northern area is on a steeply sloping boundary of the course and the southern one is part of the course. They can be observed from Poles Lane.

== See also ==
- List of Sites of Special Scientific Interest in Hertfordshire
