= Wormley-Hoddesdonpark Wood North =

Woodland in Hertfordshire, England

Coordinates: 51.75053°N 0.08196°W

- Site of Special Scientific Interest
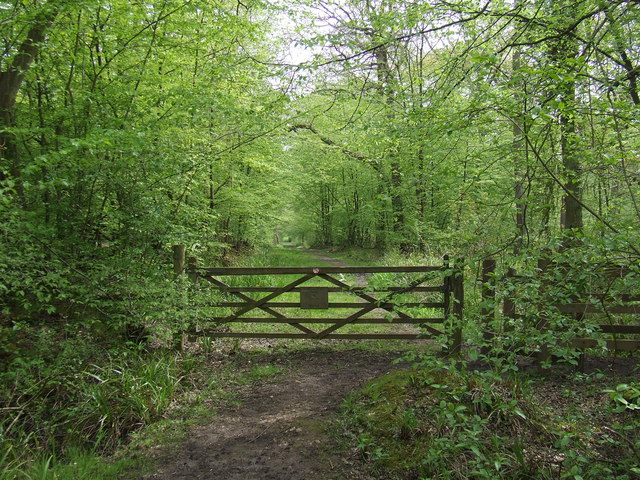
- Gate into Hoddesdonpark Wood
- Location of Wormley-Hoddesdonpark Wood North.
- Area of search: Hertfordshire
- Grid reference: TL325075
- Interest: Biological
- Area: 146.3 ha (362 acres)
- Notification date: 1986
- Location map: Magic Map

Wormley-Hoddesdonpark Wood North is a 143.9-hectare (356-acre) woodland area in Hertfordshire which has been designated as a biological Site of Special Scientific Interest. The site is listed as Grade 1 in A Nature Conservation Review, and is designated a Special Area of Conservation. It is in Hoddesdon in the Borough of Broxbourne, with a large proportion of the site in East Hertfordshire.

It includes Hoddesdonpark Wood and Broxbourne Wood, which are part of Broxbourne Woods National Nature Reserve. Broxbourne and Bencroft Woods are owned by Hertfordshire County Council and managed by HCC Countryside Management Service. The site also includes Danemead, a small area of 5.6 hectares, which is managed by the Herts and Middlesex Wildlife Trust.

== See also ==
- List of Sites of Special Scientific Interest in Hertfordshire
