= Ashwell Springs =

Protected area in Hertfordshire, England

Coordinates: 52.04206°N 0.14970°W

- Site of Special Scientific Interest
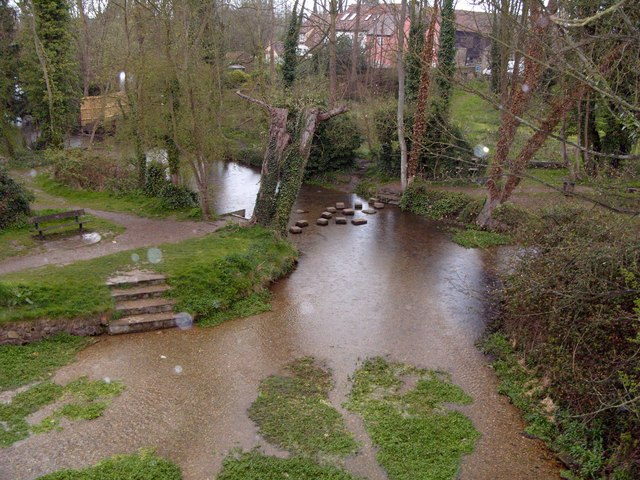
- Location of Ashwell Springs.
- Area of search: Hertfordshire
- Grid reference: TL270398
- Interest: Biological
- Area: 0.3 ha (0.74 acres)
- Notification date: 1986
- Location map: Magic Map

Ashwell Springs is a 0.3-hectare (0.74-acre) biological Site of Special Scientific Interest in Ashwell in Hertfordshire, England. The local planning authority is North Hertfordshire District Council.

The site consists of a series of freshwater springs, which form a source for the River Cam. Due to the low temperatures of the spring pools, they provide a habitat for cold-water invertebrate animals, some of which are rare. The site is particularly important for flatworms, including Crenobia alpina and the Polycelis felina. The pools are surrounded by grassland which provide shade for the water.

There is access from the High Street and by a footpath from Hodwell.

== Land ownership ==
All land within Ashwell Springs SSSI is owned by the local authority

== See also ==
- List of Sites of Special Scientific Interest in Hertfordshire
