= Tring Woodlands =

Woodland in Hertfordshire, England

Coordinates: 51.7812°N 0.6721°W

- Site of Special Scientific Interest
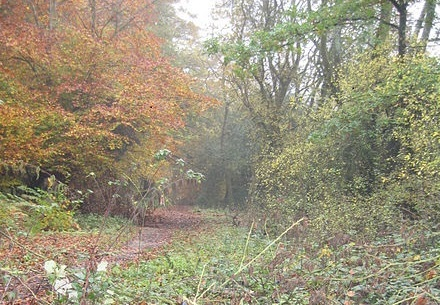
- Location of Tring Woodlands.
- Area of search: Hertfordshire
- Grid reference: SP917100
- Interest: Biological
- Area: 23.8 ha (59 acres)
- Notification date: 1985
- Location map: Magic Map

Tring Woodlands is a 23.8-hectare (59-acre) biological Site of Special Scientific Interest in Tring in Hertfordshire. It is part of the Chilterns Area of Outstanding Natural Beauty and the local planning authority is Dacorum District Council. The wood has a rich flora, showing that it is well established. It is a good example of a semi-natural beech wood in Hertfordshire. Plants that are abundant include woodruff, wood anemone and dog's mercury, and there are a variety of woodland birds. There is access to the wood from Hastoe Hill.

Tring Woodlands lies at the eastern end of the Chilterns and is a 23.8 ha (59 acres) area of semi-natural woodland. Stands of beech are intermingled with others where common ash and pedunculate oak predominate. Other trees include holly and yew in the higher parts, and in the lower parts, common dogwood, field maple, wayfaring tree, hawthorn, privet and hazel. The plentiful and diverse ground flora indicate the longevity of the woodland, and includes woodruff, wood anemone, wood sanicle, wood spurge, bramble and dog's mercury. There are about twenty species of shade-loving grasses, with wood mellick, wood barley and lesser hairy brome being particularly notable. Some rare plants present here include the yellow bird's-nest, common wintergreen, narrow-lipped helleborine, and the beech wood specialists fly orchid and white helleborine. Rides and trackways provide some open spaces and there is about 85% closed canopy, with regeneration of trees being largely limited to ash, sycamore and hawthorn.

The many resident and migratory birds include the tawny owl and the greater spotted woodpecker.

== See also ==
- List of Sites of Special Scientific Interest in Hertfordshire
