= Aldbury Nowers =

Protected area in Hertfordshire, England

Coordinates: 51.811569°N 0.618893°W

- Site of Special Scientific Interest
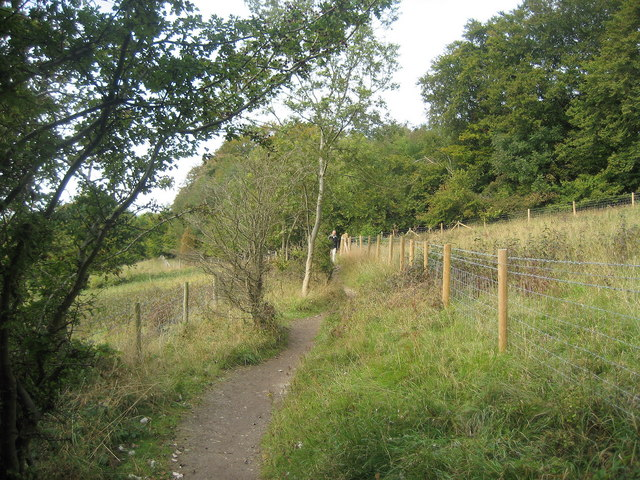
- Location of Aldbury Nowers.
- Area of search: Hertfordshire
- Grid reference: SP952135
- Interest: Biological
- Area: 19.7 hectares (49 acres)
- Notification date: 1990
- Location map: Magic Map

Aldbury Nowers is a 19.7 hectares (49 acres) biological Site of Special Scientific Interest (SSSI) in the Chiltern Hills, north-east of Tring in Hertfordshire. The site was notified in 1990 under the Wildlife and Countryside Act 1981. It is managed by the Hertfordshire and Middlesex Wildlife Trust.

The site, formerly known as "Duchie's Piece," comprises two areas of hillside, linked by The Ridgeway. The calcareous meadow element of the site hosts the flowers of chalk grassland and has butterfly habitats with thirty-four different species of butterfly recently recorded, including the Duke of Burgundy, hairstreaks and the Essex skipper. The site also includes a "beech hanger", a type of upland ancient woodland, and is considered one of the best examples of this feature in Hertfordshire.

Archaeological features on the site are two sections of Grim's Ditch, part of a 30-kilometre (19 mi) linear earthwork thought to originate in the Iron Age, and two bowl barrows, from either the Late Neolithic or the Bronze Age periods.

Northwest of the village of Aldbury, it adjoins the Pitstone Hill SSSI in Buckinghamshire and provides views over the Tring Gap and Vale of Aylesbury.

The site is always open and there is access by a footpath from Northfield Road.

== See also ==
- List of Sites of Special Scientific Interest in Hertfordshire
