= Wormley-Hoddesdonpark Wood South =

Woodland in Hertfordshire, England

Coordinates: 51.7441°N 0.0735°W

- Site of Special Scientific Interest
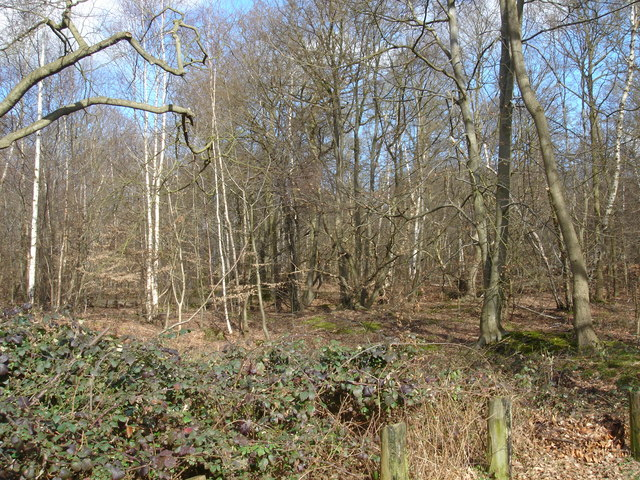
- Location of Wormley-Hoddesdonpark Wood South.
- Area of search: Hertfordshire
- Grid reference: TL331068
- Interest: Biological
- Area: 192.5 ha (476 acres)
- Notification date: 1984
- Location map: Magic Map

Wormley-Hoddesdonpark Wood South is a 192.5 hectares (476 acres) is a biological site of Special Scientific Interest near Cheshunt in Hertfordshire. It is part of Broxbourne Woods National Nature Reserve, and is listed in A Nature Conservation Review. Wormley Wood is owned and managed by the Woodland Trust. The site is also a Special Area of Conservation.

The site is oak and hornbeam woodland mainly on London clay. Plants in the variable ground flora include brambles, wood anemones and bluebells. Other habitats include marshland and acidic grassland.

White Stubbs Lane runs along the northern edge of the site.

== See also ==
- List of Sites of Special Scientific Interest in Hertfordshire
