= Redwell Wood =

Protected area in Hertfordshire, England

Coordinates: 51.7081°N 0.2459°W

- Site of Special Scientific Interest
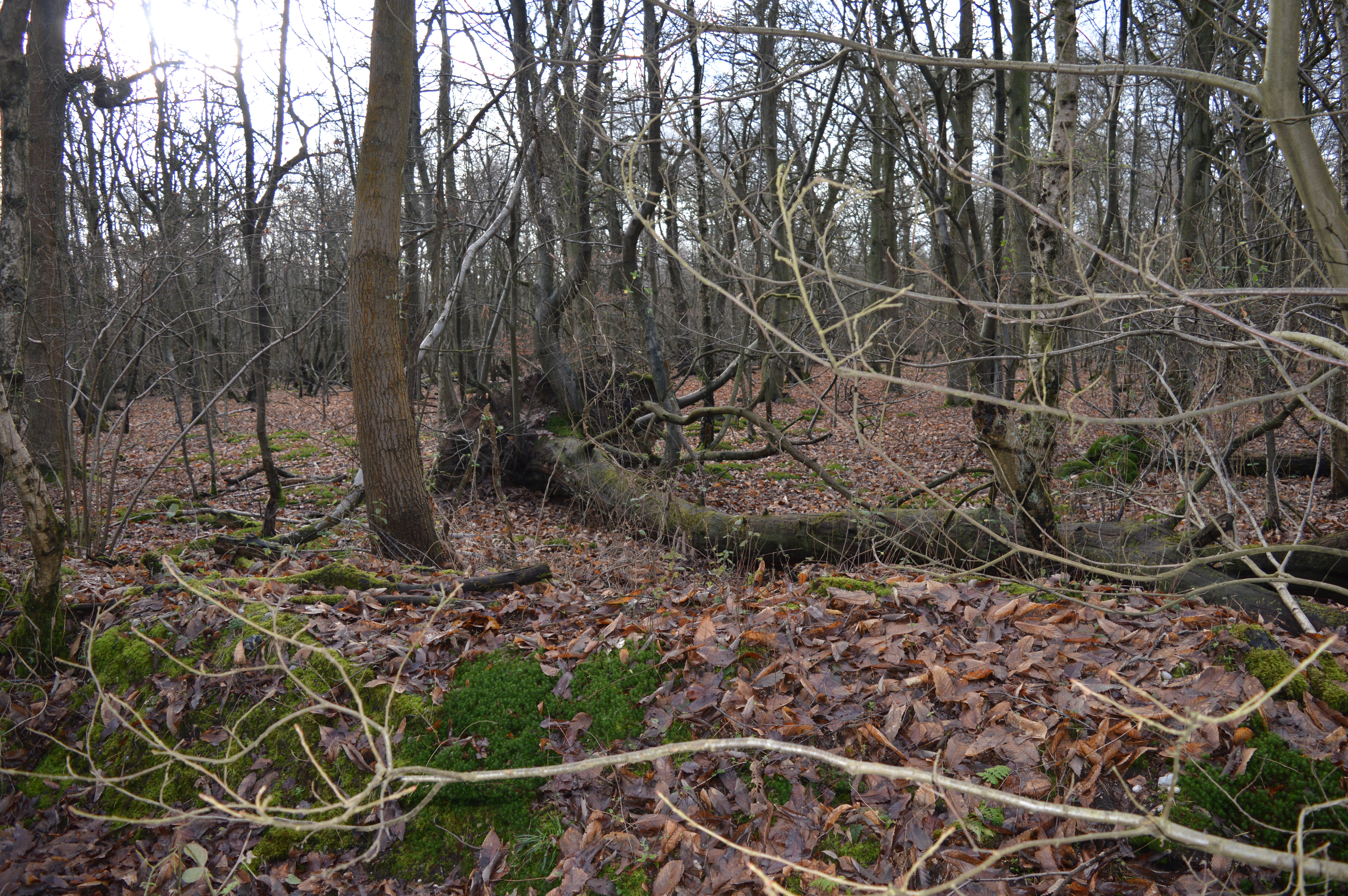
- Fallen tree in Redwell Wood
- Location of Redwell Wood.
- Area of search: Hertfordshire
- Grid reference: TL213025
- Interest: Biological
- Area: 52.8 ha (130 acres)
- Notification date: 1984
- Location map: Magic Map

Redwell Wood is a 52.8-hectare (130-acre) biological Site of Special Scientific Interest near South Mimms in Hertfordshire. The local planning authority is split between Hertsmere Borough Council and Welwyn Hatfield District Council.

The site has ancient and secondary woodland, heath and scrub. The woodland canopy is dominated by pedunculate oak. Ground flora include bluebells and enchanter’s-nightshade, while heathland species include heather and the rare creeping willow.

There is access from Blackhorse Lane.

== See also ==
- List of Sites of Special Scientific Interest in Hertfordshire
