= Patmore Heath =

Protected area in Hertfordshire, England

Coordinates: 51.9110°N 0.09597°E

- Site of Special Scientific Interest
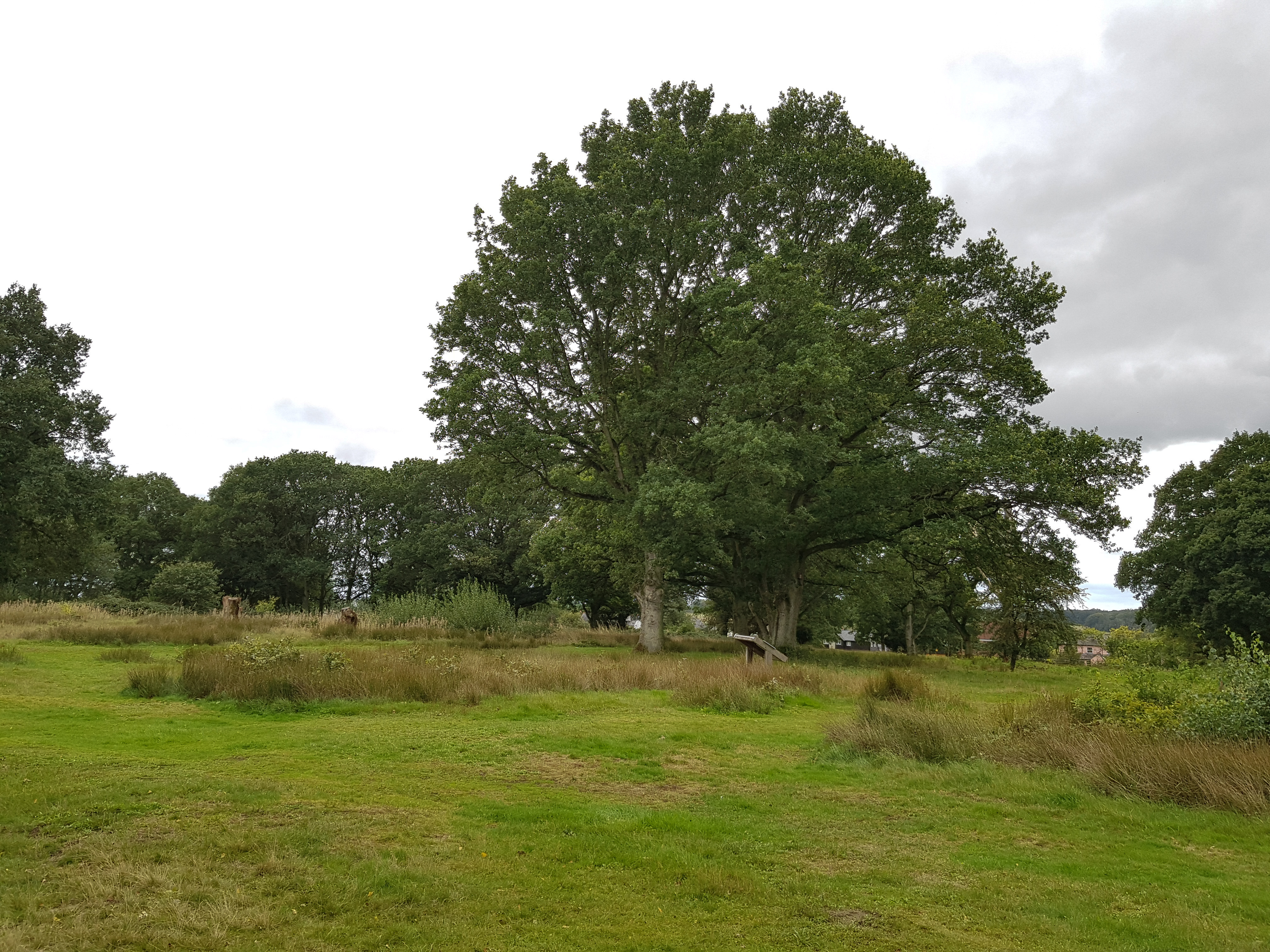
- Location of Patmore Heath.
- Area of search: Hertfordshire
- Grid reference: TL 442 257
- Interest: Biological
- Area: 7.6 ha (19 acres)
- Notification date: 1985
- Location map: Magic Map

Patmore Heath is a 7.6 hectares (19 acres) biological Site of Special Scientific Interest in East Hertfordshire, England, 2 kilometres north-east of Albury. The site was notified in 1985 under the Wildlife and Countryside Act 1981. Patmore Heath is home to a large amount of dry grass, as well as marshy areas. Much turf throughout the site is dominated by Deschampsia, as well as occurrences of Anthoxanthum odoratum.

The site is managed by the Hertfordshire and Middlesex Wildlife Trust. It is accessed by a path from Albury Road and is open at all times.

Patmore Heath is also the name of a nearby hamlet.

== See also ==
- List of Sites of Special Scientific Interest in Hertfordshire
