= Moor Hall Meadows =

Coordinates: 51.9211°N 0.0674°W

- Site of Special Scientific Interest
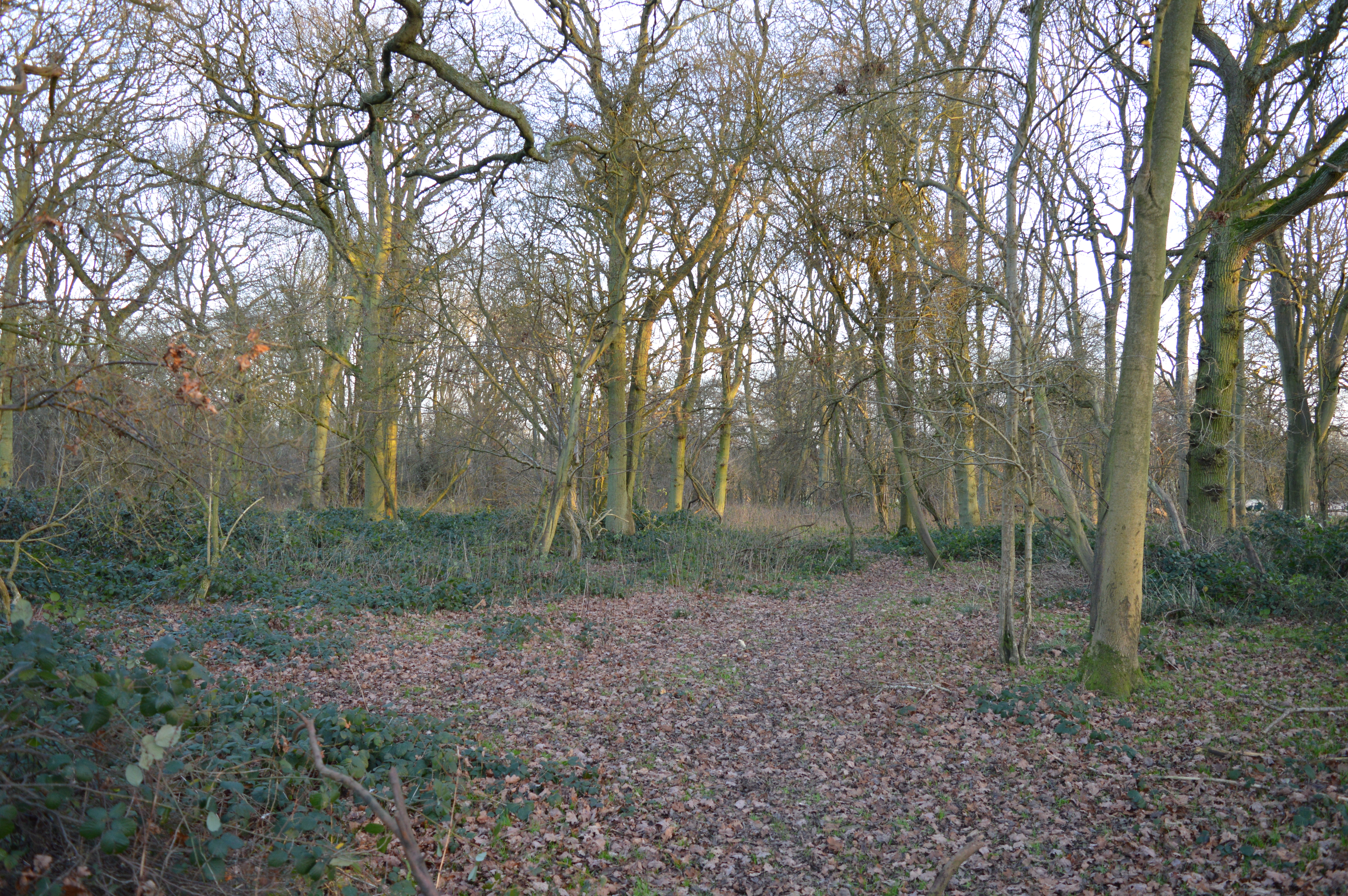
- Great Wood in Moor Hall Meadows
- Location of Moor Hall Meadows.
- Area of search: Hertfordshire
- Grid reference: TL 330265
- Interest: Biological
- Area: 24.4 ha (60 acres)
- Notification date: 1986
- Location map: Magic Map

Moor Hall Meadows is a 24.4-hectare (60-acre) biological Site of Special Scientific Interest in Moor Green in Hertfordshire. The local planning authority is East Hertfordshire District Council.

The site has a variety of types of meadows, with marshy grassland being the most extensive. Its rich flora makes it one of the most important grassland sites in the county. There is also a small ancient woodland which has a variety of breeding birds.

There is access by a narrow footpath near Moor Hall.

== See also ==
- List of Sites of Special Scientific Interest in Hertfordshire
