= Little Heath, near Hemel Hempstead, Hertfordshire =

Woodland in Hertfordshire, England

Coordinates: 51.7633°N 0.5278°W

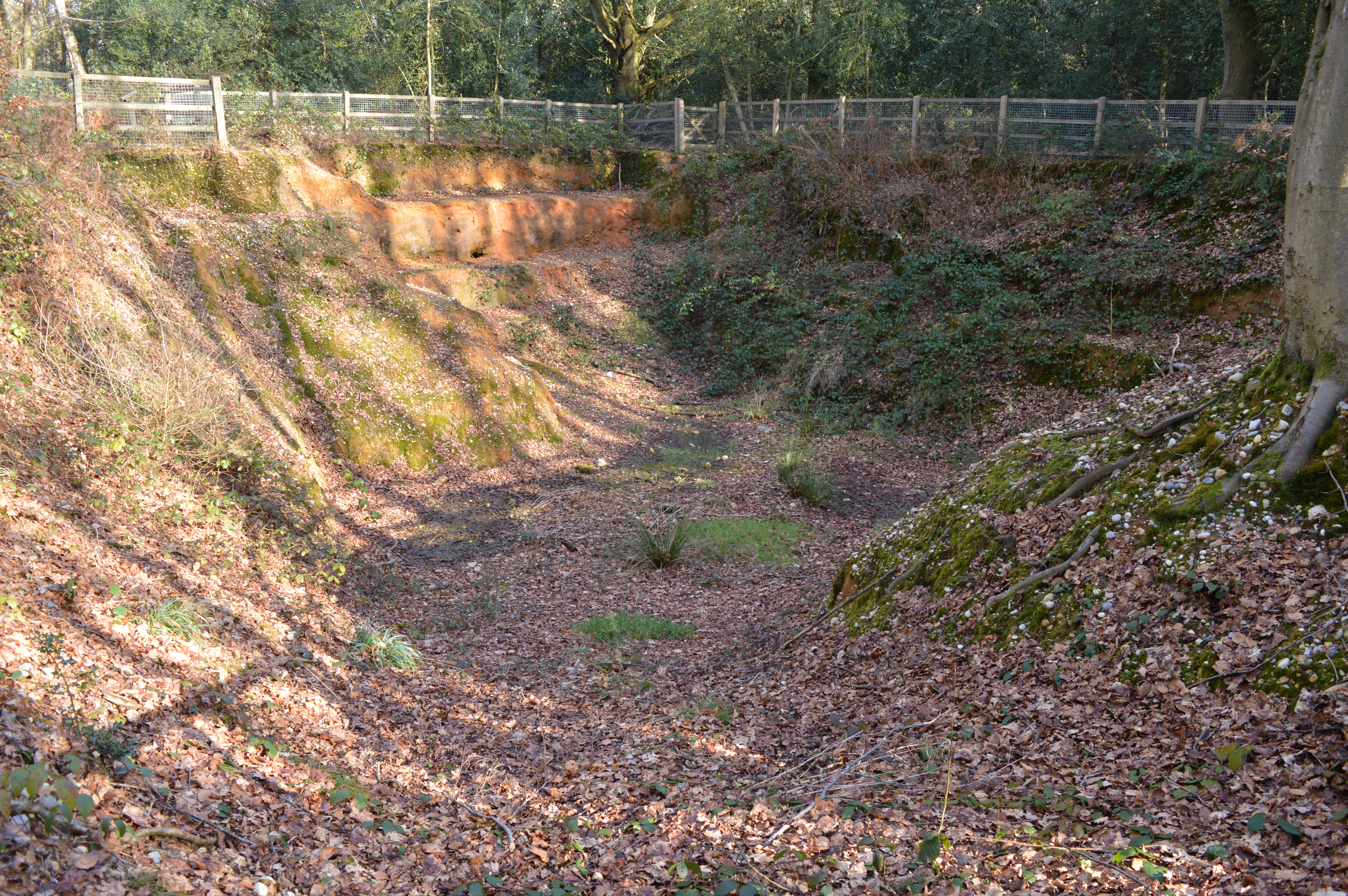
The pit at Little Heath, a SSSI

Little Heath is a partly wooded area with scattered housing, just south of the village of Potten End, Hertfordshire, England.

It represents the top of the Chiltern Hill plateau and has distinctive geological beds that remain while they have been eroded elsewhere. The exposed structure of ancient coastal deposition known as Little Heath Pit has been classified as a Site of Special Scientific Interest (SSSI) because of its unique geology.

The land is a detached part of the Ashridge estate and owned by the National Trust. The woods are dotted with many deep pits called dells which are the remains of gravel extraction during World War 1 for production of sandbags. There are up-market detached residences and a tea room with a small plant nursery.

Two World War II anti tank bollards lie at the bend in Bullbeggers Lane on the south-western side of the wood.
