= Hillcollins Pit =

Coordinates: 51.920741°N 0.095653295°E

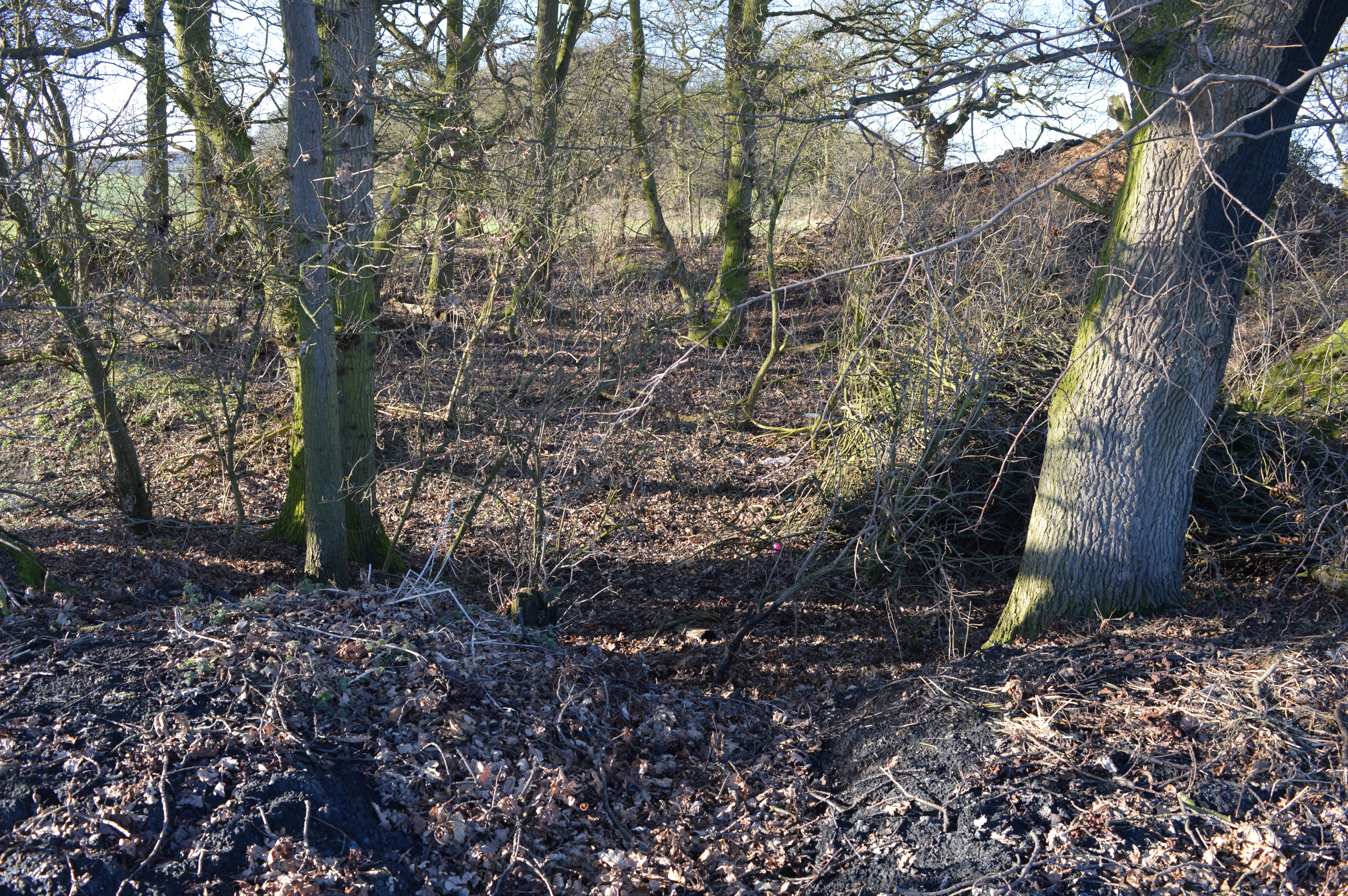

Hillcollins Pit or Furneux Pelham Gravel Pit is a 0.2-hectare (0.49-acre) geological Site of Special Scientific Interest near Furneux Pelham in Hertfordshire. The local planning authority is East Hertfordshire District Council. it was identified as a site of national importance in the Geological Conservation Review in 1988.

This is a disused gravel pit which exposes the Westland Green Gravels, which were laid down by the ancestral River Thames 1.6 to 1.8 million years ago. At this time the Thames flowed from Oxford through the Goring Gap to Norwich, and the Gravels show the ancient course of the river. As the original site where the Gravels were identified is now completely degraded, Hillcollins Pit is now considered the type site for the Westland Green Gravels, and is of considerable importance in reconstructing the evolution of the geography of southern Britain.

There is access to the site from a track between Furneux Pelham and Gravesend.
