= Broxbourne Woods =

Protected area in Hertfordshire, England

- IUCN category IV (habitat/species management area)
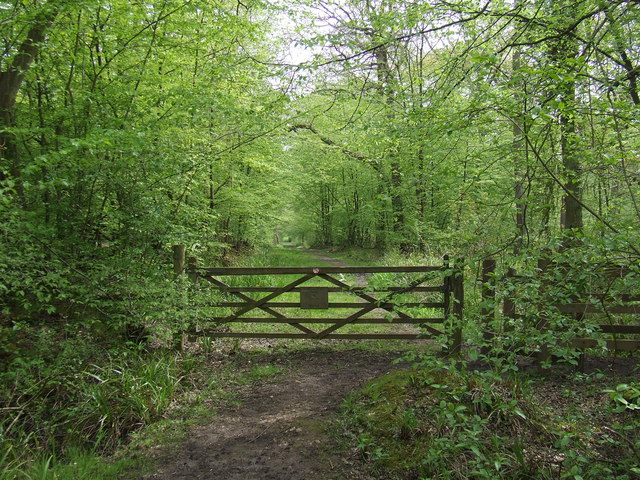
- Gate into Hoddesdon Park Wood

- Location within England
- Location: Hertfordshire, England
- Nearest city: Broxbourne
- Coordinates: 51.7478°N 0.082075°W
- Area: 239.1 ha (591 acres)
- Governing body: Hertfordshire County Council and the Woodland Trust

Broxbourne Woods are a 239.1 hectare National Nature Reserve west of Broxbourne in Hertfordshire. The site is Hertfordshire's only National Nature Reserve, and is also a Special Area of Conservation. It covers Hoddesdonpark Wood, Wormley Wood, Broxbourne Wood and Bencroft Wood. Bencroft and Broxbourne are owned by Hertfordshire County Council, and Hoddesdonpark and Wormley Woods by the Woodland Trust. They are all in Sites of Special Scientific Interest; Wormley Wood and Bencroft Wood form almost all of Wormley-Hoddesdonpark Wood South, and Hoddesdonpark Wood and Broxbourne Wood are part of Wormley-Hoddesdonpark Wood North.

The site is a large area of sessile oak and hornbeam woodland with diverse wildlife Flowers include bluebells, and invertebrates the rare purple emperor butterfly.

There is access to Hoddesdonpark Wood from Lord Street, to Broxbourne Wood from Pembridge Lane, and to Wormley and Bencroft Woods from White Stubbs Lane.
