= Oughtonhead Lane =

Coordinates: 51.9552°N 0.2959°W

- Site of Special Scientific Interest
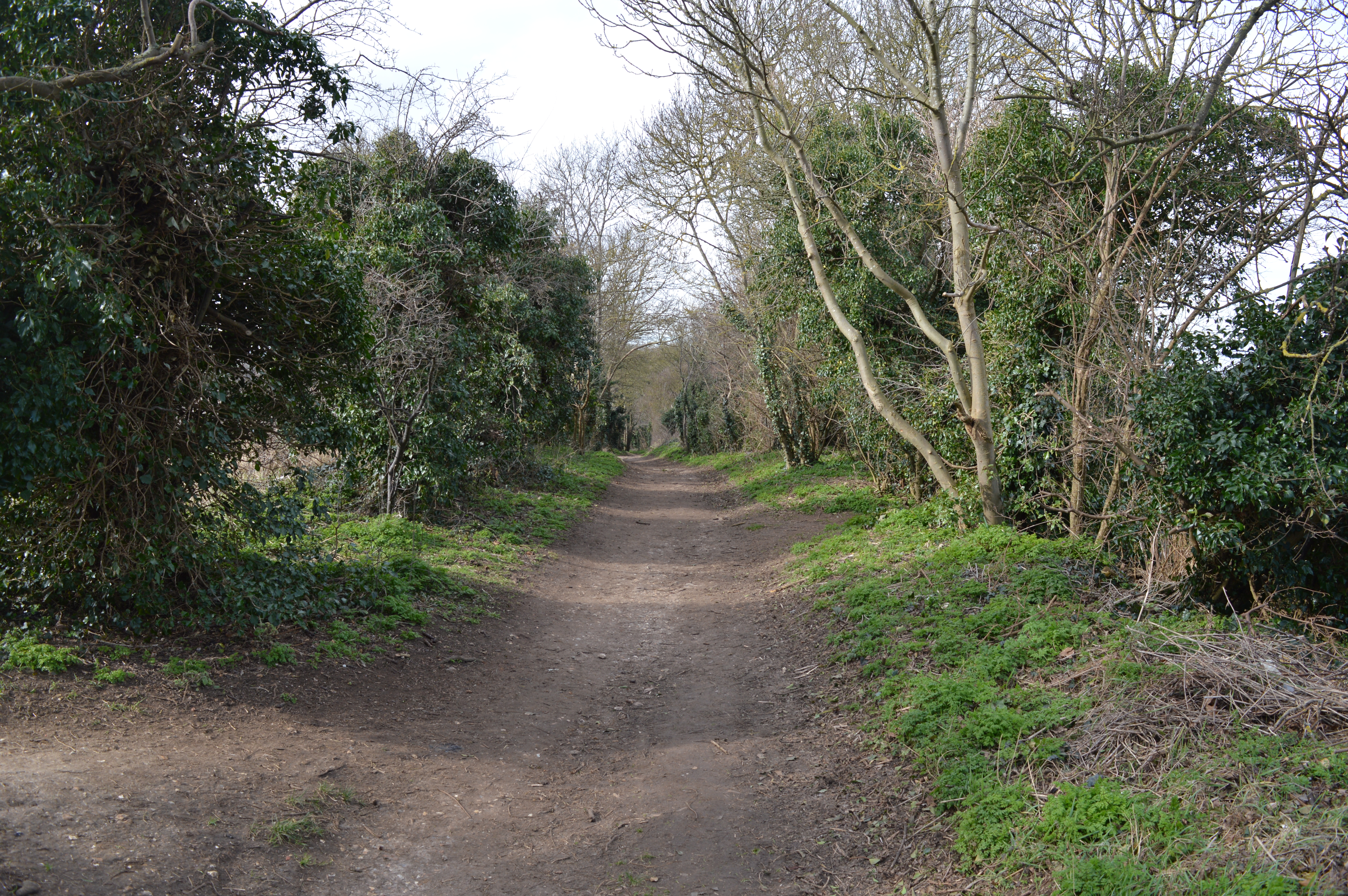
- Location of Oughtonhead Lane.
- Area of search: Hertfordshire
- Grid reference: TL172299
- Interest: Geological
- Area: 0.9 ha (2.2 acres)
- Notification date: 1989
- Location map: Magic Map

Oughtonhead Lane is a 0.9-hectare (2.2-acre) geological Site of Special Scientific Interest in Hitchin in Hertfordshire. The local planning authority is North Hertfordshire District Council. The site has been identified as of national importance in the Geological Conservation Review.

The site probably dates to the Hoxnian interglacial 420,000 to 300,000 years ago. It was then a marsh fed by springs, and it has a tufa which contains fossil land snails and mammal bones which show the climate and local environmental conditions.

The site is a public lane and a shallow trench would be required to expose the geology.
