= Little Heath Pit =

Protected area in Hertfordshire, England

Coordinates: 51.7633°N 0.5278°W

- Site of Special Scientific Interest
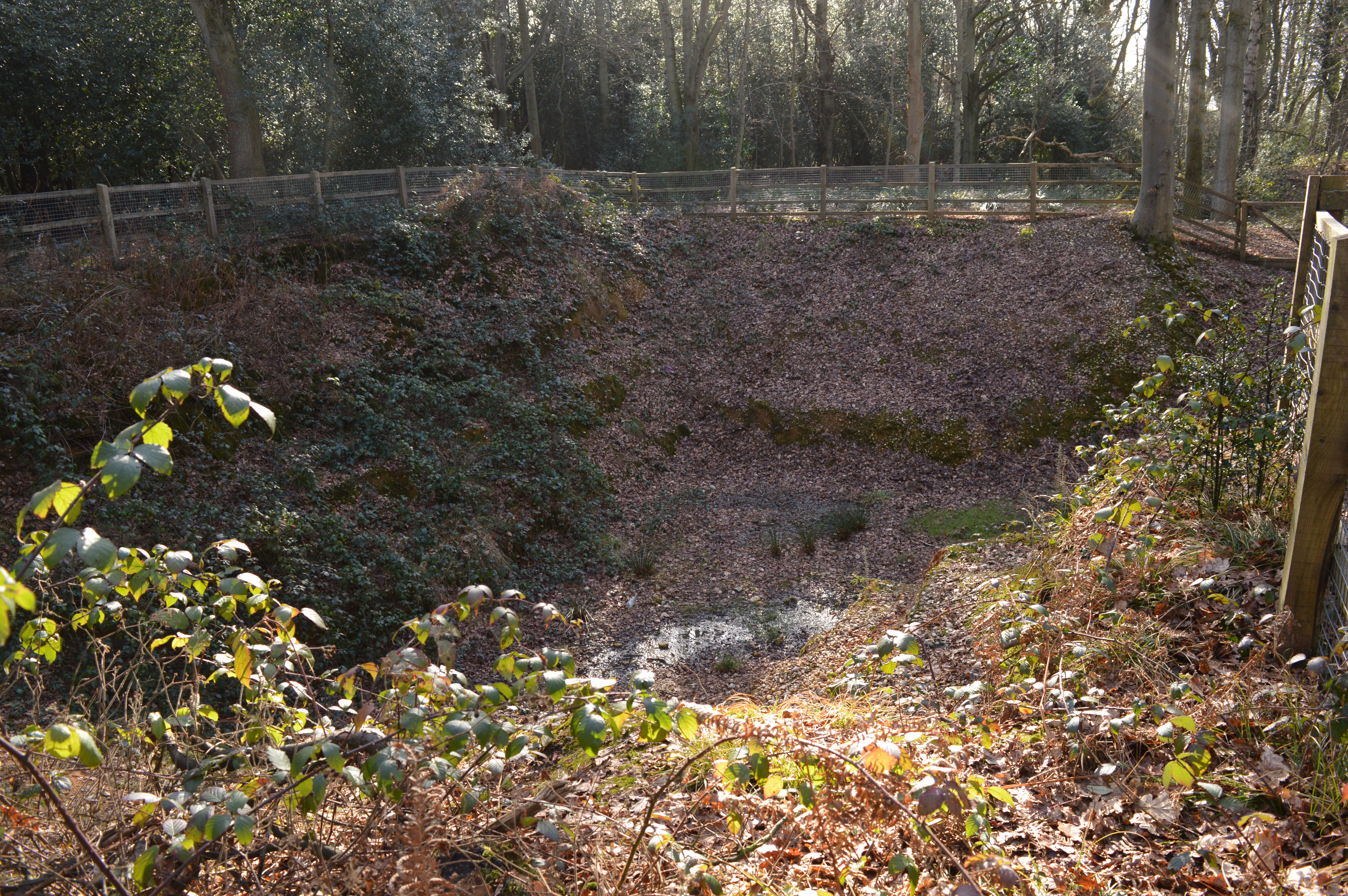
- Location of Little Heath Pit.
- Area of search: Hertfordshire
- Grid reference: TL017082
- Interest: Geological
- Area: 0.3 ha (0.74 acres)
- Notification date: 1986
- Location map: Magic Map

Little Heath Pit is a 0.3-hectare (0.74-acre) geological Site of Special Scientific Interest at Little Heath near Potten End in Hertfordshire. It is part of the Ashridge Estate, owned by the National Trust, and the local planning authority is Dacorum Borough Council. It is listed in the Geological Conservation Review.

The lowest layer is gravel dating to the beginning of the Pleistocene 2.6 million years ago. At this time the North Sea covered much of south-east England and the site was in an inter-tidal area, but since then the Chiltern Hills have risen 170 metres. Above this gravel layer is sand, and then another layer of gravel laid down some 20,000 years ago. This was the height of the last ice age, when the site was cold tundra like western Siberia today. According to Natural England the site is "controversial" as the new excavation shows gravel of possible marine origin rather than glacial till as previously believed.

The size of the site is unclear. In April 2012 the Planning Inspectorate gave consent for the erection of fencing round the site to allow re-excavation of the site while protecting it against badger damage and protecting the public against accidentally falling into the deep pit. The size was given as 360 square metres (0.036 hectares). The excavation and erection of the fence were carried out shortly afterwards. However, the Natural England (NE) citation gives the area as 0.3 hectares and the NE map shows a larger area of 1.2 hectares.

There is access to the site from Bullbeggars Lane.

The surrounding area is wooded and covered in deep pits called locally 'dells''. These are the remains of working to extract the gravel during World War One to make sandbags of use at the front.
