= Great Hormead Park =

Woodland near Great Hormead, Hertfordshire, England

Coordinates: 51.9432°N 0.0616°E

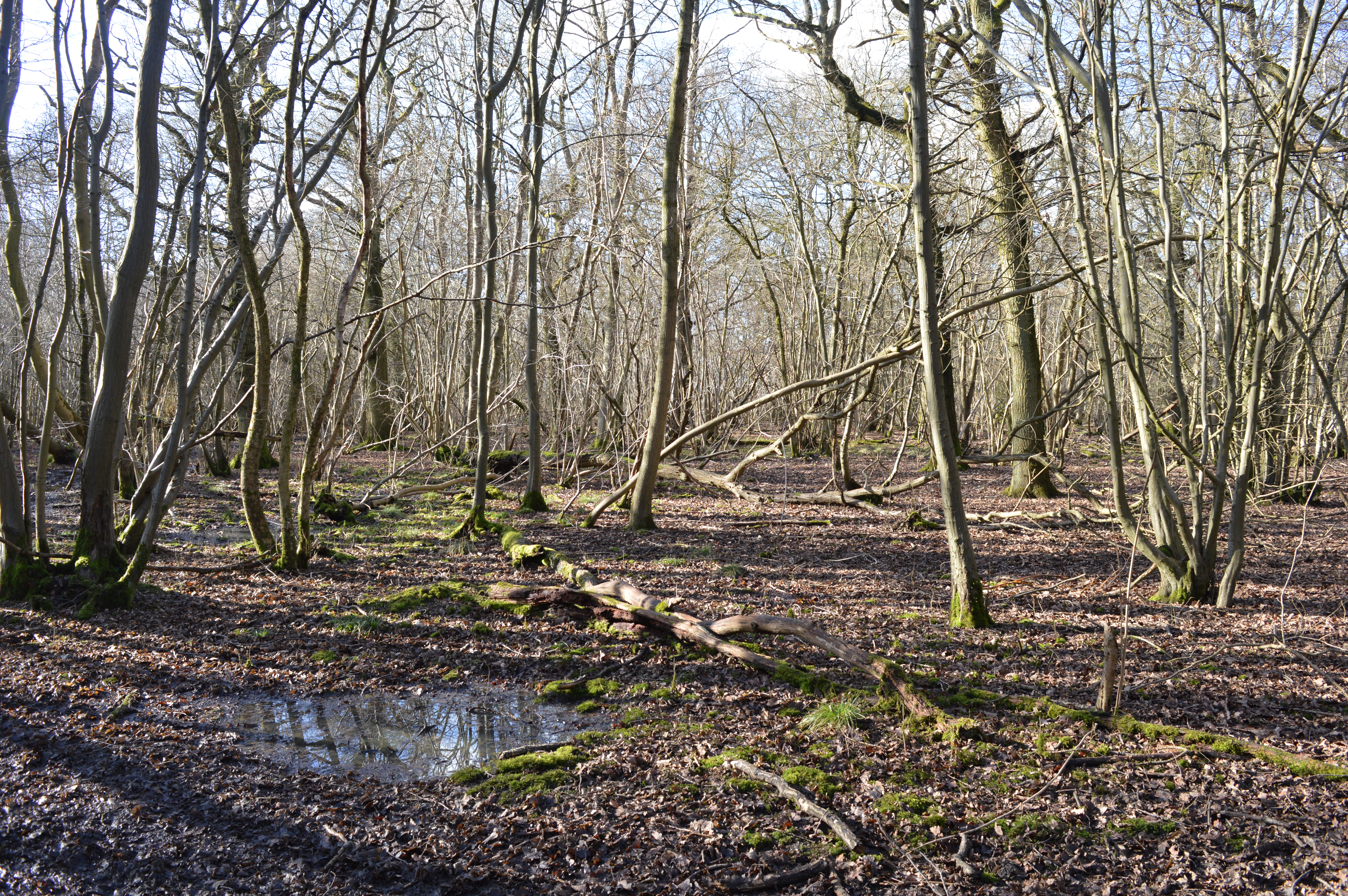

Great Hormead Park is a 15 hectare biological Site of Special Scientific Interest near Great Hormead in Hertfordshire. The local planning authority is East Hertfordshire District Council.

The site is coppiced ancient woodland on boulder clay. It has diverse tree species, including wych elm and hornbeam, resulting in a rich ground flora. Dog's mercury is dominant over most of the woodland floor, with plants such as angelica sylvestris and tufted hair grass in wetter areas.

There is access by footpaths from Great Hormead, Little Hormead and Furneux Pelham.
