= Heath milkwort =

Heath milkwort is a common name for several plants and may refer to the following species:

- Comesperma ericinum, from Australia
- Polygala serpyllifolia, from Europe
