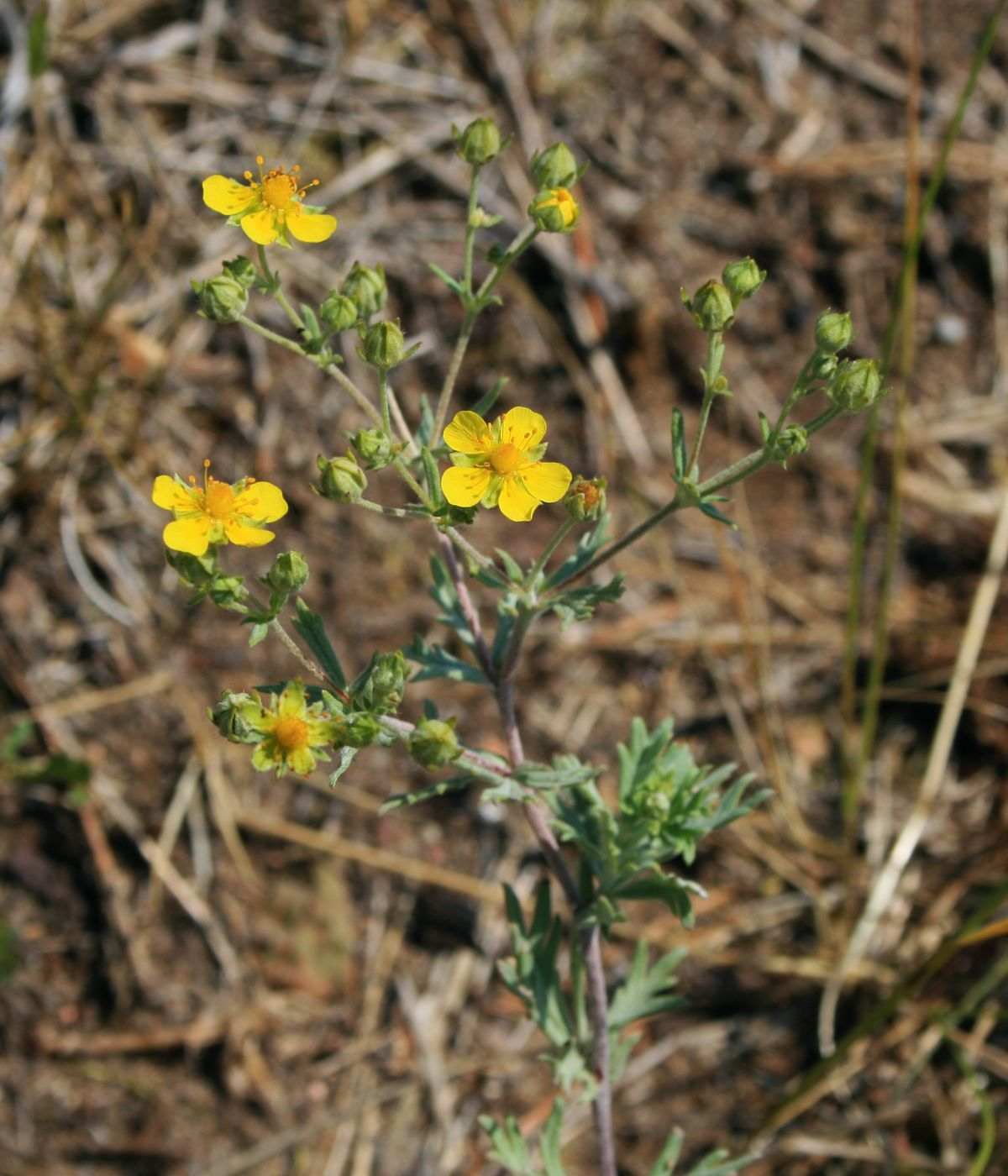

Scientific classification
- Kingdom: Plantae
- Clade: Tracheophytes
- Clade: Angiosperms
- Clade: Eudicots
- Clade: Rosids
- Order: Rosales
- Family: Rosaceae
- Genus: Potentilla
- Species: P. argentea

Binomial name
- Potentilla argentea L.

= Potentilla argentea =

Species of herb

Potentilla argentea, known as hoary cinquefoil, silver cinquefoil, silvery cinquefoil, or silver-leaf cinquefoil, is a perennial herb (or forb) in the family Rosaceae. Potentilla argentea is native to Europe, Asia Minor, and Siberia, and is introduced throughout temperate areas in North America and in New Zealand.

== Description ==
The basal leaves are palmate, generally in groups of five, grey-green above and silvery-white and tomentose below. With multiple flowers per plant, the flowers bloom a few at a time from late Spring to mid-Summer. Flowers are about 1 to 1.5 cm wide, and are five-petaled, with the petals rounded, wedge-shaped, and separated, sulphur-yellow coloured, in leafy cymes. Its growth habit is upright or sprawling, to 0.5 m high.

Potentilla argentea thrives in sunny, disturbed, and well-drained areas at elevations from sea level to 2000 m.

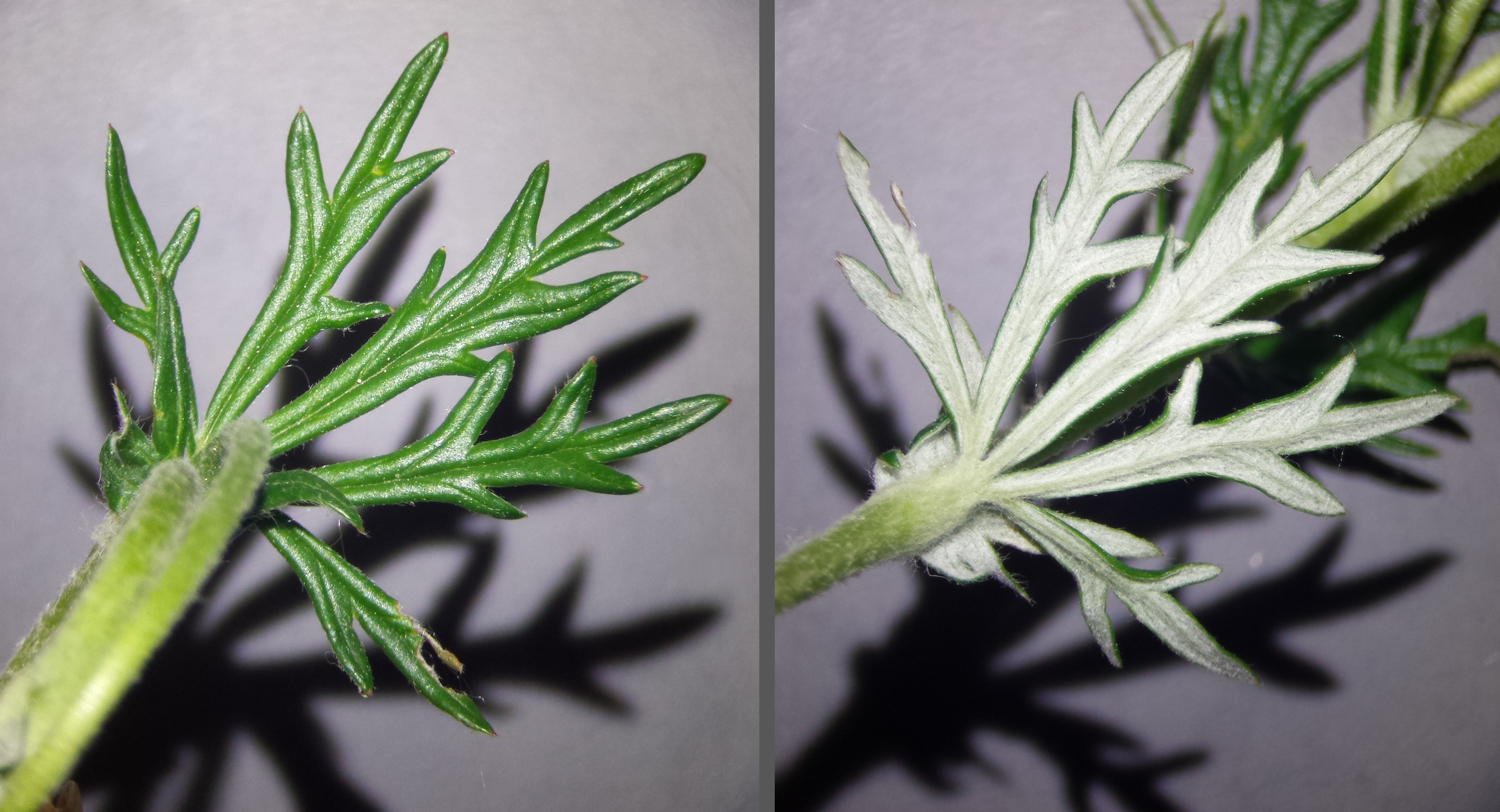
Upper (left) and lower (right) leaf surfaces
