= List of Limonium species =

The following species in the flowering plant genus Limonium, often called sea-lavenders, statices, and marsh-rosemaries, are accepted by Plants of the World Online. As of November 2024, Plants of the World Online accepts 605 species. About 70% of these species are endemic to the Mediterranean Basin.

== Species ==
=== A ===
- Limonium × abnorme (Rouy) P.Fourn.
- Limonium acuminatum L.Bolus
- Limonium acutifolium (Rchb.) C.E.Salmon
- Limonium adilguneri Yıld. & Doğru-Koca
- Limonium admirabile Terrones, J.Moreno, M.Á.Alonso, Juan & M.B.Crespo
- Limonium aegaeum Erben & Brullo
- Limonium aegusae Brullo
- Limonium afghanicum Erben & Podlech
- Limonium afrum (Pignatti) Domina
- Limonium albarracinense Pau ex P.P.Ferrer & R.Roselló
- Limonium albidum (Guss.) Pignatti
- Limonium albomarginatum Brullo
- Limonium albuferae P.P.Ferrer, R.Roselló, M.Rosato, Rosselló & E.Laguna
- Limonium album (Coincy) Sennen
- Limonium alcudianum Erben
- Limonium algarvense Erben
- Limonium algusae (Brullo) Greuter
- Limonium alicunense Gómiz
- Limonium alleizettei (Pau) Brullo & Erben
- Limonium alutaceum (Steven) Kuntze
- Limonium × ambiguum (Rouy) P.Fourn.
- Limonium ammochostianum Erben, Christodoulou, Hand & Kefalas
- Limonium ammophilon (Papatsou & Phitos) Domina
- Limonium amoenum (C.H.Wright) R.A.Dyer
- Limonium amopicum Erben & Brullo
- Limonium ampuriense Arrigoni & Diana
- Limonium anatolicum Hedge
- Limonium anglicum (Ingr.) P.D.Sell
- Limonium angustebracteatum Erben
- Limonium anthericoides (Schltr.) R.A.Dyer
- Limonium antipaxorum R.Artelari
- Limonium antonii-llorensii L.Llorens
- Limonium aphroditae R.Artelari & Georgiou
- Limonium apulum Brullo
- Limonium aragonense (Debeaux ex Willk.) Pignatti
- Limonium arboreum (Willd.) H.Arnaud
- Limonium archeothirae Erben & Brullo
- Limonium arcuatum R.Artelari
- Limonium arenosum Erben
- Limonium argentarium Pignatti
- Limonium articulatum (Loisel.) Kuntze
- Limonium artruchium Erben
- Limonium asparagoides (Coss. & Durieu ex Batt.) Maire
- Limonium asperrimum Maire
- Limonium asterotrichum (C.E.Salmon) C.E.Salmon
- Limonium astypaleanum Erben & Brullo
- Limonium athinense Erben & Brullo
- Limonium atticum Erben & Brullo
- Limonium aucheri (Girard) Greuter & Burdet
- Limonium aureum (L.) Chaz.
- Limonium auriculae-ursifolium (Pourr.) Druce
- Limonium auriculifolium (Vahl) Druce
- Limonium australe (R.Br.) Kuntze
- Limonium avei (De Not.) Brullo & Erben
- Limonium axillare (Forssk.) Kuntze

=== B ===
- Limonium bahamense (Griseb.) Britton
- Limonium balearicum (Pignatti) Brullo
- Limonium barceloi Gil & L.Llorens
- Limonium battandieri Greuter & Burdet
- Limonium bellidifolium (Gouan) Dumort.
- Limonium benmageci Marrero Rodr.
- Limonium bianorii (Sennen & Pau) Erben
- Limonium bicolor (Bunge) Kuntze
- Limonium biflorum (Pignatti) Pignatti
- Limonium billardierei (Girard) Kuntze
- Limonium binervosum (G.E.Sm.) C.E.Salmon
- Limonium bocconei (Lojac.) Litard.
- Limonium boirae L.Llorens & Tébar
- Limonium boitardii Maire
- Limonium bollei (Webb ex Wangerin) Erben
- Limonium bolosii Gil & L.Llorens
- Limonium bonafei Erben
- Limonium bonduellei (T.Lestib.) Kuntze
- Limonium bonifaciense Arrigoni & Diana
- Limonium botschantzevii (Lincz.) M.Malekm., Akhani & Borsch
- Limonium bourgaei (Webb ex Boiss.) Kuntze
- Limonium brasiliense (Boiss.) Kuntze
- Limonium brassicifolium (Webb & Berthel.) Kuntze
- Limonium braunii (Bolle) A.Chev.
- Limonium brevipetiolatum R.Artelari & Erben
- Limonium britannicum Ingr.
- Limonium brunneri (Webb ex Boiss.) Kuntze
- Limonium brusnicense (Trinajstić) Bogdanović & Brullo
- Limonium brutium Brullo
- Limonium bulgaricum Ančev
- Limonium bungei (Claus) Gamajun.
- Limonium busianum Bogdanović & Brullo
- Limonium byzacium Brullo & Erben

=== C ===
- Limonium caesium (Girard) Kuntze
- Limonium calabrum Brullo
- Limonium calaminare Pignatti
- Limonium calanchicola Erben
- Limonium calcarae (Tod. ex Janka) Pignatti
- Limonium calcicola P.D.Sell
- Limonium californicum (Boiss.) A.Heller
- Limonium callianthum (T.X.Peng) Kamelin
- Limonium calliopsium Alf.Mayer
- Limonium cambrense (Ingr.) P.D.Sell
- Limonium camposanum Erben
- Limonium cancellatum (Bernh. ex Bertol.) Kuntze
- Limonium cantianum (Ingr.) P.D.Sell
- Limonium capense (L.Bolus) L.Bolus
- Limonium capitis-eliae Erben
- Limonium capitis-marci Arrigoni & Diana
- Limonium caprariae Rizzotto
- Limonium caprariense (Font Quer & Marcos) Pignatti
- Limonium carisae Erben
- Limonium carminis B.Díez & Erben
- Limonium carnosum (Boiss.) Kuntze
- Limonium carolinianum (Walter) Britton
- Limonium carpathum (Rech.f.) Rech.f.
- Limonium carpetanicum Erben
- Limonium carregadorense Erben
- Limonium carthaginense (Rouy) C.E.Hubb. & Sandwith
- Limonium carvalhoi Rosselló & L.Sáez
- Limonium caspium (Willd.) P.Fourn.
- Limonium castellonense Erben
- Limonium catalaunicum (Willk. & Costa) Pignatti
- Limonium catanense (Tineo ex Lojac.) Brullo
- Limonium catanzaroi Brullo
- Limonium cavanillesii Erben
- Limonium cazzae Bogdanović & Brullo
- Limonium cedrorum Domina & Raimondo
- Limonium celticum (Ingr.) P.D.Sell
- Limonium cephalonicum R.Artelari
- Limonium cercinense Brullo & Erben
- Limonium chazaliei (H.Boissieu) Maire
- Limonium chersonesum Erben & Brullo
- Limonium chrysocomum (Kar. & Kir.) Kuntze
- Limonium chrysopotamicum Maire
- Limonium clupeanum Brullo & Erben
- Limonium cofrentanum Erben
- Limonium × coincyi Sennen
- Limonium comosum Erben
- Limonium compactum Erben & Brullo
- Limonium companyonis (Gren. & Billot) Kuntze
- Limonium confertum Brullo & Erben
- Limonium confusum (Gren. & Godr.) Fourr.
- Limonium congestum (Ledeb.) Kuntze
- Limonium connivens Erben
- Limonium contortirameum (Mabille) Erben
- Limonium contractum Erben & Brullo
- Limonium coombense (Ingr.) P.D.Sell
- Limonium cophanense C.Brullo, Brullo, Cambria, Giusso & Ilardi
- Limonium coralliforme Alf.Mayer
- Limonium coralloides (Tausch) Lincz.
- Limonium cordatum (L.) Mill.
- Limonium cordovillense Stübing & Cirujano
- Limonium × coriacifolium (Sennen) M.B.Crespo & Serra
- Limonium coriarium H.Arnaud
- Limonium corinthiacum (Boiss. & Heldr.) Kuntze
- Limonium cornarianum Kypr. & R.Artelari
- Limonium coronense R.Artelari
- Limonium corsicum Erben
- Limonium cossonianum Kuntze
- Limonium costae (Willk.) Pignatti
- Limonium cosyrense (Guss.) Kuntze
- Limonium crateriforme Erben & Brullo
- Limonium cretaceum Cherkasova
- Limonium creticum R.Artelari
- Limonium cumanum (Ten.) Kuntze
- Limonium cunicularium Arrigoni & Diana
- Limonium cylindrifolium (Forssk.) Verdc. ex Cufod.
- Limonium cymuliferum (Boiss.) Sauvage & Vindt
- Limonium cyprium (Meikle) Hand & Buttler
- Limonium cyrenaicum (Rouy) Brullo
- Limonium cyrtostachyum (Girard) Brullo
- Limonium cythereum R.Artelari & Georgiou

=== D ===
- Limonium dagmariae Mucina
- Limonium damboldtianum Phitos & R.Artelari
- Limonium daveaui Erben
- Limonium davisii Doğan
- Limonium decumbens (Boiss.) Kuntze
- Limonium delicatulum (Girard) Kuntze
- Limonium dendroides Svent.
- Limonium densiflorum (Guss.) Kuntze
- Limonium densissimum (Pignatti) Pignatti
- Limonium depauperatum (Boiss.) R.A.Dyer
- Limonium devoniense (Ingr.) P.D.Sell
- Limonium dianium Pignatti
- Limonium dichotomum (Cav.) Kuntze
- Limonium dichroanthum (Rupr.) Ikonn.-Gal.
- Limonium dictyophorum (Tausch) Degen
- Limonium didimense Doğan & Akaydın
- Limonium dielsianum (Wangerin) Kamelin
- Limonium diomedeum Brullo
- Limonium dodartiforme Ingr.
- Limonium dodartii (Girard) Kuntze
- Limonium doerfleri (Halácsy) Rech.f.
- Limonium × dolcheri Pignatti
- Limonium dolihiense Erben & Brullo
- Limonium donetzicum Klokov
- Limonium doriae (Sommier) Pignatti
- Limonium dragonericum Erben
- Limonium dregeanum (C.Presl) Kuntze
- Limonium drepanostachyum Ikonn.-Gal.
- Limonium dubium (Andrews ex Guss.) Litard.
- Limonium dufourii (Girard) Kuntze
- Limonium durieui (Girard) Kuntze
- Limonium duriusculum (Girard) Fourr.
- Limonium dyeri Lincz.

=== E ===
- Limonium ebusitanum (Font Quer) Font Quer
- Limonium echioides (L.) Mill.
- Limonium eduardi-diasii H.Schaef.
- Limonium effusum (Boiss.) Kuntze
- Limonium ejulabilis Rosselló, Mus & J.X.Soler
- Limonium elaphonisicum Alf.Mayer
- Limonium elfahsianum Brullo & Giusso
- Limonium emarginatum (Willd.) Kuntze
- Limonium epiroticum Brullo
- Limonium equisetinum (Boiss.) R.A.Dyer
- Limonium × erectiflorum (B.Fedtsch. & Gontsch.) A.V.Grebenjuk
- Limonium erythrorrhizum Ikonn.-Gal. ex Lincz.
- Limonium × escarrei L.Llorens & Tébar
- Limonium estevei Fern.Casas
- Limonium etruscum Arrigoni & Rizzotto
- Limonium eugeniae Sennen

=== F ===
- Limonium failachicum Erben & Mucina
- Limonium fajzievii Zakirov
- Limonium fallax (Coss. ex Wangerin) Maire
- Limonium ferganense Ikonn.-Gal.
- Limonium fesianum Erben
- Limonium fischeri (Trautv.) Lincz.
- Limonium flagellare (Lojac.) Brullo
- Limonium flexuosum (L.) Chaz.
- Limonium florentinum Arrigoni & Diana
- Limonium fontqueri (Pau) L.Llorens ex Greuter, Burdet & G.Long
- Limonium formenterae L.Llorens
- Limonium formosum Bartolo, Brullo & Giusso
- Limonium fradinianum (Pomel) Erben
- Limonium fragile Erben & Brullo
- Limonium franchetii (Debeaux) Kuntze
- Limonium frederici (Barbey) Rech.f.
- Limonium frutescens (Lem.) Erben, A.Santos & Reyes-Bet.
- Limonium furfuraceum (Lag.) Kuntze
- Limonium furnarii Brullo

=== G ===
- Limonium gabrieli (Bornm.) Rech.f.
- Limonium galilaeum Domina, Danin & Raimondo
- Limonium gallurense Arrigoni & Diana
- Limonium gibertii (Sennen) Sennen
- Limonium ginzbergeri Bogdanović & Brullo
- Limonium girardianum (Guss.) Fourr.
- Limonium globuliferum (Boiss. & Heldr.) Kuntze
- Limonium glomeratum (Tausch) Erben
- Limonium gmelini (Willd.) Kuntze
- Limonium gorgonae Pignatti
- Limonium gougetianum (Girard) Kuntze
- Limonium grabusae Erben & Brullo
- Limonium graecum (Poir.) Kuntze
- Limonium greuteri Erben
- Limonium grosii L.Llorens
- Limonium grubovii Lincz.
- Limonium guaicuru (Molina) Kuntze
- Limonium gueneri Doğan, H.Duman & Akaydın
- Limonium guigliae Raimondo & Domina
- Limonium gymnesicum Erben

=== H ===
- Limonium halophilum Pignatti
- Limonium helenae Erben & Brullo
- Limonium heraionense Erben & Brullo
- Limonium herculis Pignatti
- Limonium hermaeum Pignatti
- Limonium heterospicatum Erben
- Limonium hibericum Erben
- Limonium hierapetrae Rech.f.
- Limonium himariense F.K.Mey.
- Limonium hipponense Brullo & Erben
- Limonium hirsuticalyx Pignatti
- Limonium hoeltzeri (Regel) Ikonn.-Gal.
- Limonium humile Mill.
- Limonium hungaricum Klokov
- Limonium hyblaeum Brullo
- Limonium hypanicum Klokov

=== I ===
- Limonium iconicum (Boiss. & Heldr.) Kuntze
- Limonium ikaricum Erben & Brullo
- Limonium ilergabonum López-Alvarado, Cobacho, Arán & L.Sáez
- Limonium ilvae Pignatti
- Limonium imbricatum (Webb ex Girard) H.Arnaud
- Limonium inarimense (Guss.) Pignatti
- Limonium inexpectans L.Sáez & Rosselló
- Limonium insigne (Coss.) Kuntze
- Limonium insulare (Bég. & Landi) Arrigoni & Diana
- Limonium intercedens P.D.Sell
- Limonium interjectum J.X.Soler & Rosselló
- Limonium intermedium (Guss.) Brullo
- Limonium intricatum Brullo & Erben
- Limonium ionicum Brullo
- Limonium iranicum (Bornm.) Lincz.
- Limonium irtaensis P.P.Ferrer, A.Navarro, P.Pérez, R.Roselló, Rosselló, M.Rosato
- Limonium isidorum Erben & Brullo
- Limonium issaeum Bogdanović & Brullo
- Limonium istriacum Bogdanović & Brullo
- Limonium ithacense R.Artelari

=== J ===
- Limonium jankae (Lojac.) Giardina & Raimondo
- Limonium japygicum (E.Groves) Pignatti
- Limonium jovibarba (Webb ex Boiss.) Kuntze

=== K ===
- Limonium kairouanum Brullo & Erben
- Limonium kardamylii R.Artelari & Kamari
- Limonium karpasiticum Kefalas, Erben, Christodoulou & Hand
- Limonium kaschgaricum (Rupr.) Ikonn.-Gal.
- Limonium kimmericum (Lipsky) Klokov
- Limonium kirikosicum Erben & Brullo
- Limonium kobstanicum Tzvelev
- Limonium korakonisicum R.Artelari & Valli
- Limonium korbousense Brullo & Erben
- Limonium kraussianum (Buchinger ex Boiss.) Kuntze
- Limonium ksamilum Bogdanović, Shuka, Giusso & Brullo
- Limonium kurgantjubense (Lincz.) M.Malekm., Akhani & Borsch

=== L ===
- Limonium lacertosum Brullo & Erben
- Limonium lacinium Arrigoni
- Limonium lacostei (Danguy) Kamelin
- Limonium laetum (Nyman) Pignatti
- Limonium lagostanum Bogdanović & Brullo
- Limonium lambinonii Erben
- Limonium lanfrancoi Agius, M.E.Galea, Cambria, Giusso & Brullo
- Limonium latebracteatum Erben
- Limonium lausianum Pignatti
- Limonium laxiusculum Franco
- Limonium legrandii (R.Gauthier & Timb.-Lagr.) Erben
- Limonium leonardi-llorensii L.Sáez, Á.C.Carvalho & Rosselló
- Limonium leprosorum Bogdanović & Brullo
- Limonium leptolobum Kuntze
- Limonium leptophyllum (Schrenk) Kuntze
- Limonium letourneuxii (Coss. ex Batt.) Greuter & Burdet
- Limonium liberianum Bogdanović & Brullo
- Limonium liburnicum Bogdanović & Brullo
- Limonium lilacinum (Boiss. & Balansa) Wagenitz
- Limonium lilybaeum Brullo
- Limonium limbatum Small
- Limonium linifolium (L.f.) Chaz.
- Limonium lobatum (L.f.) Chaz.
- Limonium lobetanicum Erben
- Limonium lobinii N.Kilian & Leyens
- Limonium loganicum Ingr.
- Limonium lojaconoi Brullo
- Limonium longibracteatum Erben
- Limonium longifolium (Thunb.) R.A.Dyer
- Limonium lopadusanum Brullo
- Limonium lovricii Bogdanović & Brullo
- Limonium lowei R.Jardim, M.Seq., Capelo, J.C.Costa & Rivas Mart.
- Limonium × lucentinum Pignatti & Freitag

=== M ===
- Limonium macrophyllum (Willd. ex Spreng.) Kuntze
- Limonium macrorrhizum (Ledeb.) Kuntze
- Limonium magallufianum L.Llorens
- Limonium majoricum Pignatti
- Limonium majus (Boiss.) Erben
- Limonium malacitanum B.Díez
- Limonium malfatanicum Erben
- Limonium mansanetianum M.B.Crespo & Lledó
- Limonium marisolii L.Llorens
- Limonium maritimum Caperta, Cortinhas, A.P.Paes, Guara, Esp.Santo & Erben
- Limonium marmarisense Doğan & Akaydın
- Limonium maroccanum (Batt. & Trab.) Domina
- Limonium mateoi Erben & Arán
- Limonium maurocordatae (Schweinf. & Volkens) Cufod.
- Limonium mazarae Pignatti ex Brullo
- Limonium meandrinum Erben & Brullo
- Limonium melancholicum Brullo, Marcenò & S.Romano
- Limonium melitense Brullo
- Limonium menigense Brullo & Erben
- Limonium merxmuelleri Erben
- Limonium messeniacum R.Artelari & Kamari
- Limonium michelsonii Lincz.
- Limonium microcycladicum Erben & Brullo
- Limonium migjornense L.Llorens
- Limonium milleri Ghaz. & J.R.Edm.
- Limonium milovicii Bogdanović & Brullo
- Limonium minoricense Erben
- Limonium minus (Boiss.) Erben
- Limonium minutiflorum (Guss.) Kuntze
- Limonium minutum (L.) Chaz.
- Limonium monolithicum Erben & Brullo
- Limonium montis-christi Rizzotto
- Limonium morisianum Arrigoni
- Limonium mouretii (Pit.) Maire
- Limonium mouterdei Domina, Erben & Raimondo
- Limonium mucronatum (L.f.) Chaz.
- Limonium mucronulatum (H.Lindb.) Greuter & Burdet
- Limonium multiceps (Pomel) Erben
- Limonium multiflorum Erben
- Limonium multiforme Pignatti
- Limonium multifurcatum Erben
- Limonium muradense Erben
- Limonium mutatum (Ingr.) P.D.Sell
- Limonium myrianthum (Schrenk) Kuntze

=== N ===
- Limonium namaquanum L.Bolus
- Limonium naniforme P.D.Sell
- Limonium narbonense Mill.
- Limonium narynense Lincz.
- Limonium neapolense Brullo & Erben
- Limonium × neumanii C.E.Salmon
- Limonium normannicum Ingr.
- Limonium nudum (Boiss. & Buhse) Kuntze

=== O ===
- Limonium oblanceolatum Brullo & Erben
- Limonium obtusifolium (Rouy) Erben
- Limonium ocymifolium (Poir.) Kuntze
- Limonium oligotrichum Erben & Brullo
- Limonium omissae Bogdanović & Brullo
- Limonium optimae Raimondo
- Limonium opulentum (Lojac.) Brullo
- Limonium orellii Erben
- Limonium oristanum Alf.Mayer
- Limonium ornatum (Ball) Kuntze
- Limonium otolepis (Schrenk) Kuntze
- Limonium oudayense Sauvage & Vindt
- Limonium ovalifolium (Poir.) Kuntze

=== P ===
- Limonium pachynense Brullo
- Limonium pagasaeum Erben & Brullo
- Limonium palmare (Sm.) Rech.f.
- Limonium palmyrense (Post) Dinsm.
- Limonium panormitanum (Tod.) Pignatti
- Limonium papillatum (Webb & Berthel.) Kuntze
- Limonium paradoxum Pugsley
- Limonium paralimniticum Christodoulou, Erben, Hand & Kefalas
- Limonium parosicum Erben & Brullo
- Limonium parvibracteatum Pignatti
- Limonium parvifolium (Tineo) Pignatti
- Limonium parvum Ingr.
- Limonium patrimoniense Arrigoni & Diana
- Limonium paulayanum (Vierh.) Ghaz. & J.R.Edm.
- Limonium pavonianum Brullo
- Limonium pectinatum (Aiton) Kuntze
- Limonium pelagosae Bogdanović & Brullo
- Limonium peregrinum (P.J.Bergius) R.A.Dyer
- Limonium perezii (Stapf) F.T.Hubb.
- Limonium × pericotii (O.Bolòs & Vigo) Greuter & Burdet
- Limonium perplexum L.Sáez & Rosselló
- Limonium pescadense Greuter & Burdet
- Limonium peucetium Pignatti
- Limonium pharosianum Bogdanović & Brullo
- Limonium phitosianum R.Artelari
- Limonium pigadiense (Rech.f.) Rech.f.
- Limonium pinillense Roselló & Peris
- Limonium planesiae Pignatti
- Limonium plurisquamatum Erben
- Limonium poimenum Ilardi, Brullo, D.Cusimano & G.Giusso
- Limonium pomelianum (Rouy) Erben
- Limonium pomoense Bogdanović & Brullo
- Limonium pontium Pignatti
- Limonium ponzoi (Fiori & Bég.) Brullo
- Limonium popovii Kubansk.
- Limonium portlandicum (Ingr.) P.D.Sell
- Limonium portopetranum Erben
- Limonium portovecchiense Erben
- Limonium postii Domina, Erben & Raimondo
- Limonium potaninii Ikonn.-Gal.
- Limonium preauxii (Webb & Berthel.) Kuntze
- Limonium procerum (C.E.Salmon) Ingr.
- Limonium proliferum (d'Urv.) Erben & Brullo
- Limonium protohermaeum Arrigoni & Diana
- Limonium pruinosum (L.) Chaz.
- Limonium pseudarticulatum Erben
- Limonium pseudebusitanum Erben
- Limonium × pseudoconfusum (Rouy) P.Fourn.
- Limonium pseudodictyocladum L.Llorens
- Limonium pseudolaetum Arrigoni & Diana
- Limonium pseudominutum Erben
- Limonium pseudotranswallianum (Ingr.) P.D.Sell
- Limonium puberulum (Webb ex Lindl.) H.Arnaud
- Limonium pujosii Sauvage & Vindt
- Limonium pulviniforme Arrigoni & Diana
- Limonium punicum Brullo & Erben
- Limonium purpuratum (L.) Chaz.
- Limonium pusillum Erben & Brullo
- Limonium pylium R.Artelari
- Limonium pyramidatum Brullo & Erben

=== Q ===
- Limonium quesadense Erben
- Limonium quinnii M.B.Crespo & Pena-Martín

=== R ===
- Limonium racemosum (Lojac.) Diana
- Limonium ramosissimum (Poir.) Maire
- Limonium recticaule Erben & Brullo
- Limonium recurvum C.E.Salmon
- Limonium redivivum (Svent.) G.Kunkel & Sunding
- Limonium relicticum R.Mesa & A.Santos
- Limonium remotispiculum (Lacaita) Pignatti
- Limonium reniforme (Girard) Lincz.
- Limonium retirameum Greuter & Burdet
- Limonium retusum L.Llorens
- Limonium revolutum Erben
- Limonium rezniczenkoanum Lincz.
- Limonium rhodense M.B.Crespo & Pena-Martín
- Limonium rigidum Alf.Mayer
- Limonium rigualii M.B.Crespo & Erben
- Limonium roridum (Sm.) Brullo & Guarino
- Limonium rosselloi P.P.Ferrer, R.Roselló & E.Laguna
- Limonium rubescens Brullo & Erben
- Limonium ruizii (Font Quer) Fern.Casas
- Limonium rumicifolium (Svent.) G.Kunkel & Sunding
- Limonium rungsii Sauvage & Vindt

=== S ===
- Limonium sabulicola P.D.Sell
- Limonium salmonis (Sennen & Elías) Pignatti
- Limonium samium Erben & Brullo
- Limonium sanctamargaritense P.D.Sell
- Limonium santapolense Erben
- Limonium saracinatum R.Artelari
- Limonium sarcophyllum Ghaz. & J.R.Edm.
- Limonium sardoum (Pignatti) Erben
- Limonium sareptanum (A.K.Becker) Gams
- Limonium sarniense (Ingr.) P.D.Sell
- Limonium sartorianum Erben & Brullo
- Limonium savianum Pignatti
- Limonium saxicola Erben
- Limonium saxonicum (Ingr.) P.D.Sell
- Limonium scabrum (Thunb.) Kuntze
- Limonium schinousae Erben & Brullo
- Limonium scoparium (Pall. ex Willd.) H.Arnaud
- Limonium scopulorum M.B.Crespo & Lledó
- Limonium scorpioides Erben
- Limonium secundirameum (Lojac.) Brullo
- Limonium selinuntinum Brullo
- Limonium senkakuense T.Yamaz.
- Limonium × sennenii (Rouy) P.Fourn.
- Limonium serpentinicum R.Pino, Silva Pando & J.J.Pino
- Limonium serratum Brullo & Erben
- Limonium sibthorpianum (Guss.) Kuntze
- Limonium sieberi (Boiss.) Kuntze
- Limonium silvestrei Aparicio
- Limonium sinense (Girard) Kuntze
- Limonium sinisicum Erben
- Limonium sinuatum (L.) Mill.
- Limonium sirinicum Erben & Brullo
- Limonium sitiacum Rech.f.
- Limonium smithii Akaydın
- Limonium soboliferum Erben
- Limonium sogdianum (Popov) Ikonn.-Gal.
- Limonium sokotranum (Vierh.) Radcl.-Sm.
- Limonium solanderi Lincz.
- Limonium sommierianum (Fiori) Arrigoni
- Limonium sougiae Erben & Brullo
- Limonium spathulatum (Desf.) Kuntze
- Limonium spectabile (Svent.) G.Kunkel & Sunding
- Limonium spreitzenhoferi Erben & Brullo
- Limonium squarrosum Erben
- Limonium stenophyllum Erben
- Limonium stenotatum (Rech.f.) Erben & Brullo
- Limonium steppicum Sefi, Ghrabi-Gammar & Brullo
- Limonium stocksii (Boiss.) Kuntze
- Limonium strictissimum (Salzm.) Arrigoni
- Limonium subanfractum Trinajstić
- Limonium subglabrum Erben
- Limonium subnudum Bogdanović & Brullo
- Limonium subrotundifolium (Bég. & A.Vacc.) Brullo
- Limonium sucronicum Erben
- Limonium suffruticosum (L.) Kuntze
- Limonium sulcitanum Arrigoni
- Limonium sundingii Leyens, Lobin, N.Kilian & Erben
- Limonium supinum (Girard) Pignatti
- Limonium sventenii A.Santos & M.Fernández
- Limonium syracusanum Brullo

=== T ===
- Limonium tabernense Erben
- Limonium tabulare Bogdanović & Brullo
- Limonium tacapense Brullo & Erben
- Limonium taenari Erben & Brullo
- Limonium tamaricoides Bokkari
- Limonium tamarindanum Erben
- Limonium tarcoense Arrigoni & Diana
- Limonium tauromenitanum Brullo
- Limonium tenellum (Turcz.) Kuntze
- Limonium tenoreanum (Guss.) Pignatti
- Limonium tenuicaule Erben
- Limonium tenuiculum (Tineo ex Guss.) Pignatti
- Limonium teretifolium L.Bolus
- Limonium tetragonum (Thunb.) Bullock
- Limonium teuchirae Brullo
- Limonium thaenicum Brullo & Erben
- Limonium thiniense Erben
- Limonium thirae Erben & Brullo
- Limonium tianschanicum Lincz.
- Limonium tibulatium Pignatti
- Limonium tigulianum Arrigoni & Diana
- Limonium tineoi Giardina & Raimondo
- Limonium tobarrense J.Moreno, Terrones, M.A.Alonso, Juan & M.B.Crespo
- Limonium todaroanum Raimondo & Pignatti
- Limonium toletanum Erben
- Limonium tomentellum (Boiss.) Kuntze
- Limonium tournefortii (Girard) Erben
- Limonium trachycladum Maire & Wilczek
- Limonium transcanalis (Ingr.) P.D.Sell
- Limonium transwallisnum (Pugsley) Pugsley
- Limonium tremolsii (Rouy) Erben
- Limonium trinajsticii Bogdanović & Brullo
- Limonium tritonianum Brullo & Erben
- Limonium trojae Pignatti
- Limonium tschurjukiense (Klokov) Lavrenko
- Limonium tuberculatum (Boiss.) Kuntze
- Limonium tubiflorum (Delile) Kuntze
- Limonium tunetanum (Barratte) Maire
- Limonium tyrrhenicum Arrigoni & Diana

=== U ===
- Limonium ugijarense Erben
- Limonium ursanum Erben
- Limonium usticanum Giardina & Raimondo

=== V ===
- Limonium vaccarii Pignatti ex Brullo
- Limonium × valentinum (Huter, Porta & Rigo) M.B.Crespo & Lledó
- Limonium validum Erben
- Limonium vanandense Erben & Brullo
- Limonium vanense Kit Tan & Sorger
- Limonium velutinum Bogdanović & Brullo
- Limonium vestitum (C.E.Salmon) C.E.Salmon
- Limonium viciosoi (Pau) Erben
- Limonium vigaroense Marrero Rodr. & R.S.Almeida
- Limonium vigoi L.Sáez, Curcó & Rosselló
- Limonium viniolae Arrigoni & Diana
- Limonium × virgatoformis (Rouy) B.Bock
- Limonium virgatum (Willd.) Fourr.
- Limonium vravronense Erben & Brullo
- Limonium vulgare Mill.

=== W ===
- Limonium wendelboi Bokhari
- Limonium wiedmannii Erben
- Limonium wrightii (Hance) Kuntze

=== X ===
- Limonium xerocamposicum Erben & Brullo
- Limonium xerophilum Brullo & Erben
- Limonium xiliense Erben & Brullo
- Limonium xipholepis (Baker) Hutch. & E.A.Bruce

=== Z ===
- Limonium zacynthium R.Artelari
- Limonium zankii Bogdanović & Brullo
- Limonium zanonii (Pamp.) Domina
- Limonium zembrae Pignatti
- Limonium zeraphae Brullo
- Limonium zeugitanum Brullo & Erben
