= Statice limonium =

Statice limonium may refer to:

- Statice limonium Bigelow
- Statice limonium Cav. ex Willk. & Lange
- Statice limonium L., accepted as Limonium vulgare Mill.
- Statice limonium Pall.
- Statice limonium Thunb.
- Statice limonium var. californica (Boiss. ex DC.) A.Gray, accepted as Limonium californicum (Boiss.) A.Heller
- Statice limonium var. caroliniana (Walter) A.Gray, accepted as Limonium carolinianum (Walter) Britton
