= Agdistis frankeniae =

Scientific classification
- Kingdom: Animalia
- Phylum: Arthropoda
- Clade: Pancrustacea
- Class: Insecta
- Order: Lepidoptera
- Family: Pterophoridae
- Genus: Agdistis
- Species: A. frankeniae

Binomial name
- Agdistis frankeniae (Zeller, 1847)

Synonyms
- Adactyla frankeniae Zeller, 1847; Agdistis urmijensis Zagulajev, 1996; Agdistis bahrlutia Amsel, 1955; Agdistis kulunda Ustjuzhanin, 1991; Agdistis lerinsis Millière, 1875; Agdistis rjabovi Zagulajev & Filippova, 1976; Agdistis rupestris Bigot, 1974; Agdistis tondeuri Bigot, 1963

Species of plume moth

Agdistis frankeniae is a moth in the family Pterophoridae. It is found from Siberia through Central Asia, the northern parts of Asia and North Africa along the Mediterranean and in the west from the Canary Islands to southern France.

The wingspan is about 29 mm.

The larvae feed on Limonium minutum and Frankenia species.
