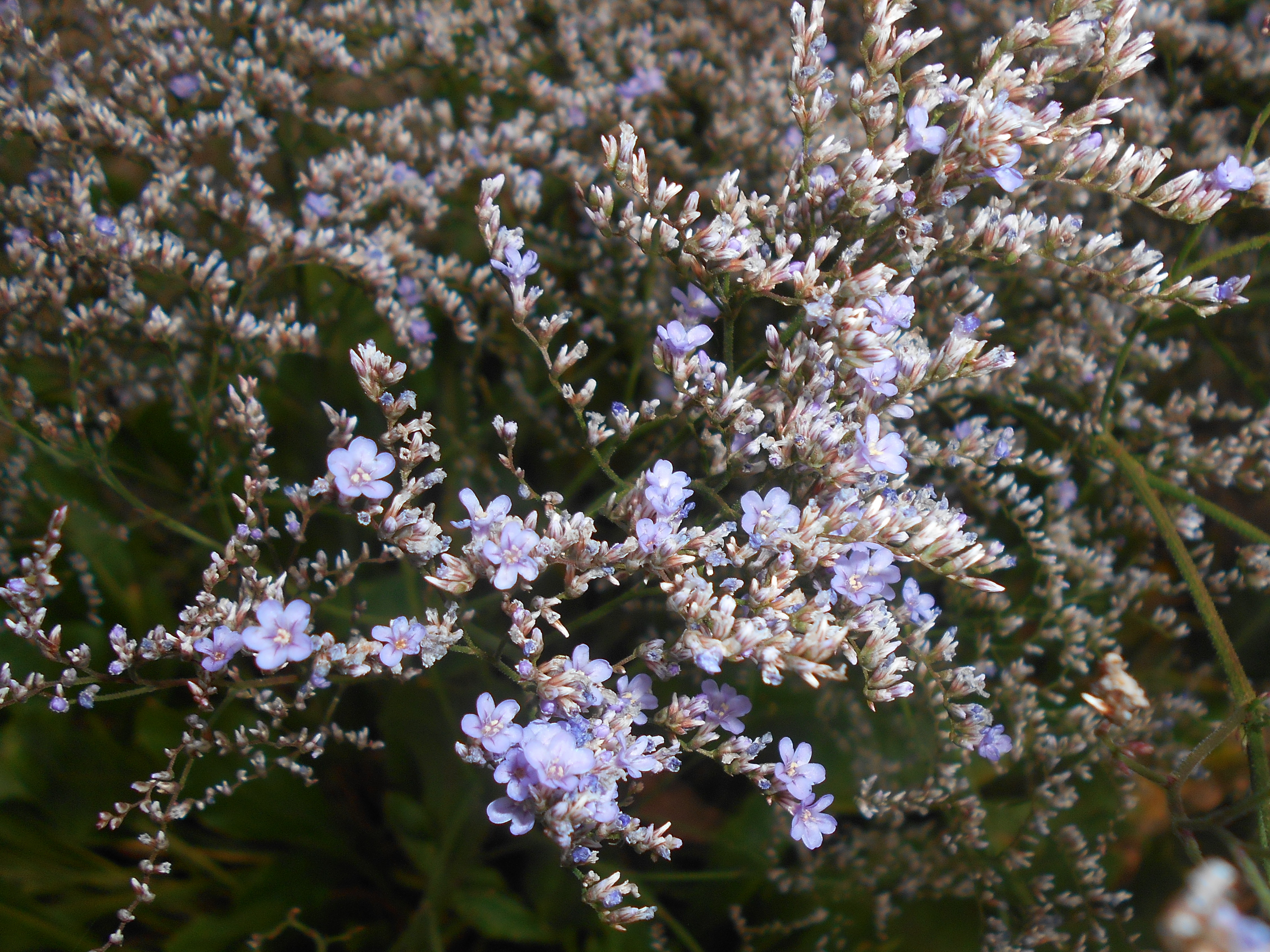
- Flowers
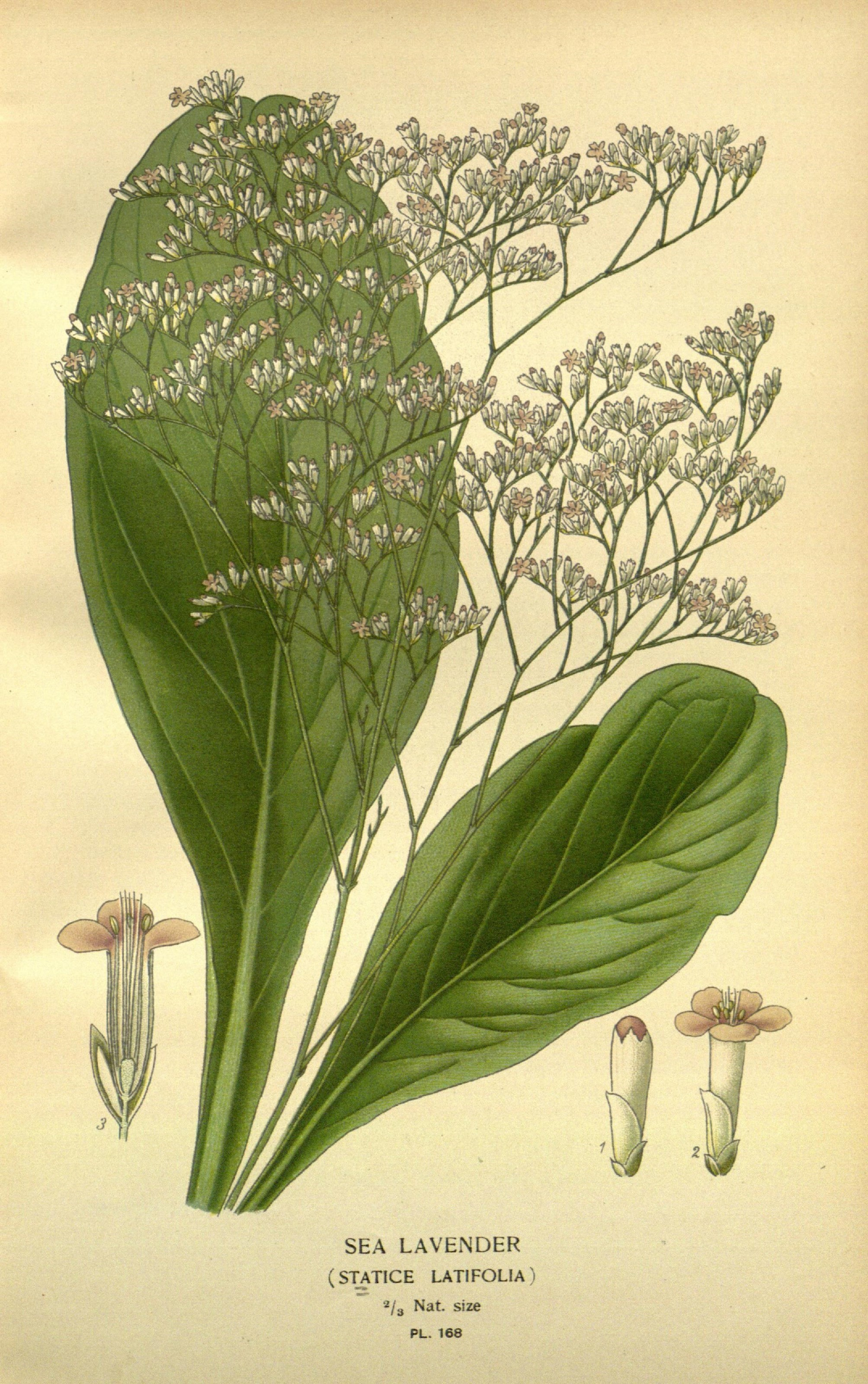
- Botanical illustration

Scientific classification
- Kingdom: Plantae
- Clade: Tracheophytes
- Clade: Angiosperms
- Clade: Eudicots
- Order: Caryophyllales
- Family: Plumbaginaceae
- Genus: Limonium
- Species: L. platyphyllum

Binomial name
- Limonium platyphyllum Lincz.

Synonyms
- Limonium gerberi Soldano; Limonium latifolium (Sm.) Kuntze; Statice coriacea Schult.; Statice coriaria Pall.; Statice latifolia Sm.; Taxanthema latifolium (Sm.) Sweet

= Limonium platyphyllum =

Species of plant

Limonium platyphyllum, the broad-leaved statice, or florist's sea lavender, is a species of flowering plant in the family Plumbaginaceae. It is native to the Black Sea region; Bulgaria, Romania, Ukraine, Crimea, south and east European Russia, and the Caucasus, and it has been introduced to Great Britain. A perennial halophyte 60 to 75 cm (24 to 30 in) tall, it is widely available from commercial suppliers. There are a number of cultivars, including the well-known 'Violetta' which has darker petals.

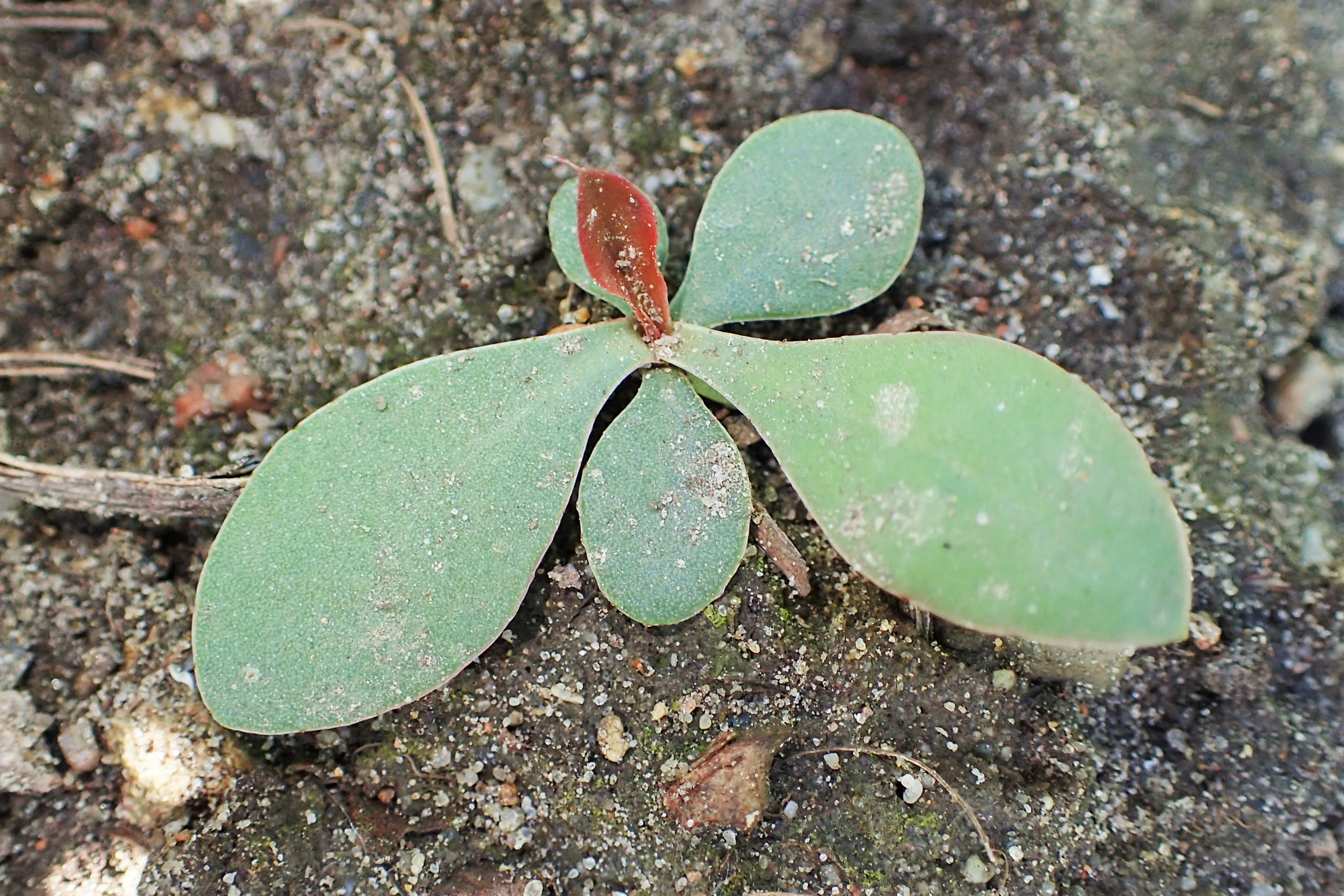
Rosette is rather typical of the plantains

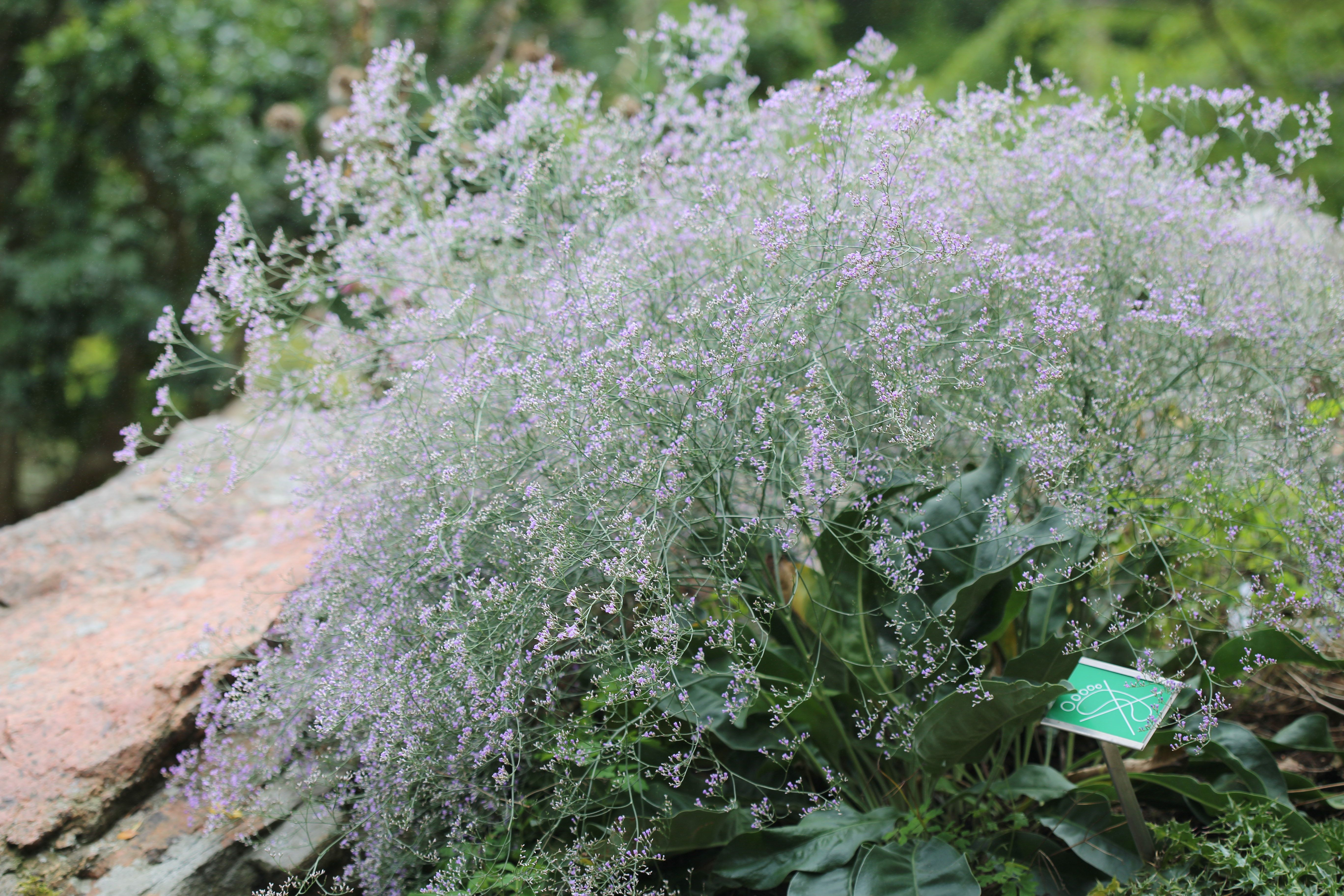
At the Gothenburg Botanical Garden

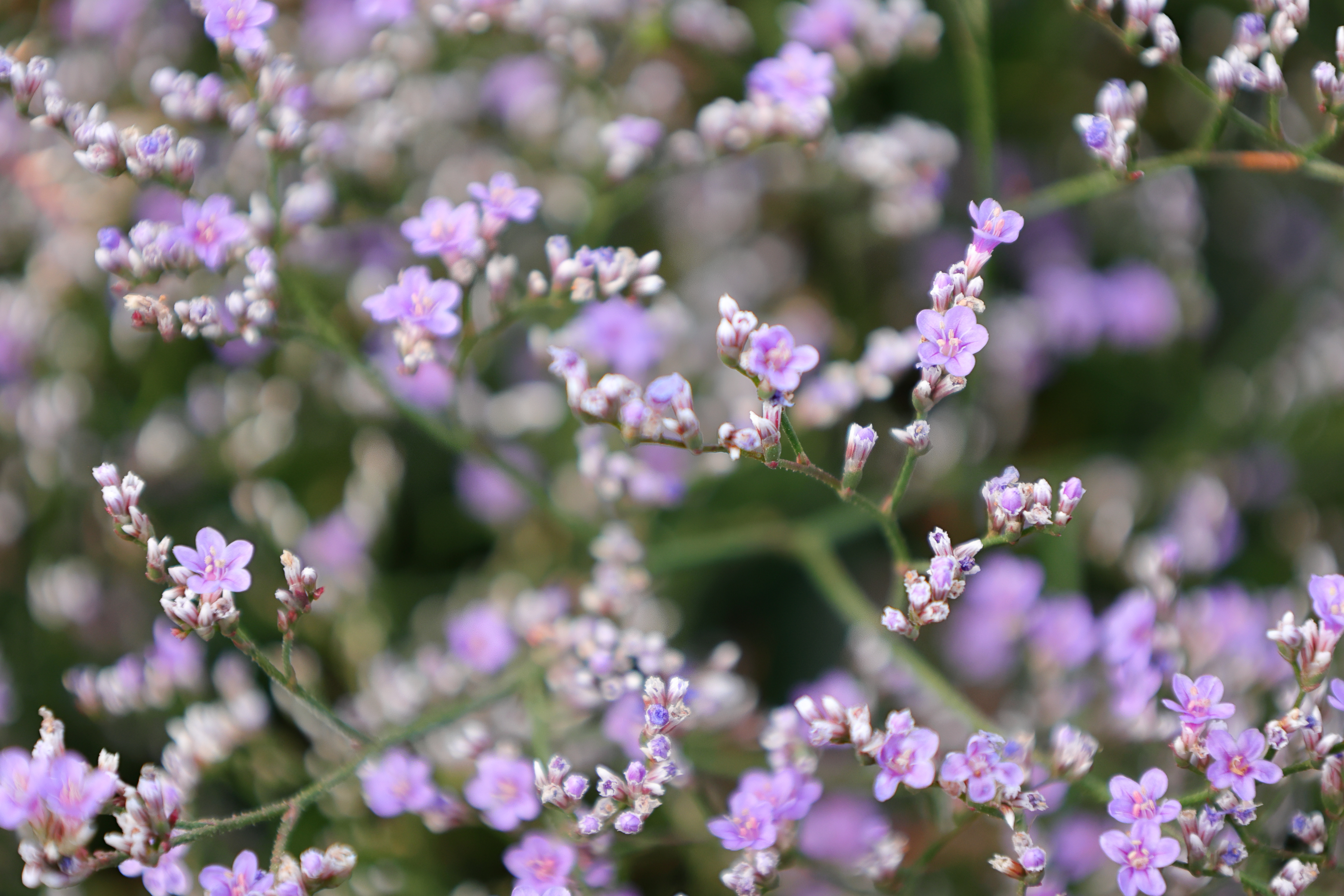
Close-up of flowers
