= Limonium greuteri =

Scientific classification
- Kingdom: Plantae
- Clade: Tracheophytes
- Clade: Angiosperms
- Clade: Eudicots
- Order: Caryophyllales
- Family: Plumbaginaceae
- Genus: Limonium
- Species: L. greuteri

Binomial name
- Limonium greuteri Erben

Species of flowering plant

Limonium greuteri is a species of Limonium from Corsica.

== Origin and distribution ==
Limonium greuteri is native to the La Revellata peninsula in northwestern Corsica.
