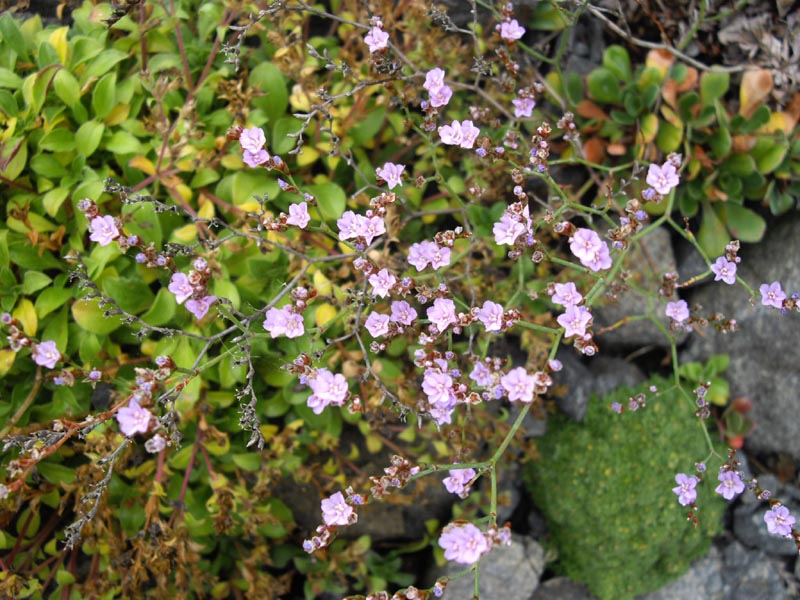

Scientific classification
- Kingdom: Plantae
- Clade: Tracheophytes
- Clade: Angiosperms
- Clade: Eudicots
- Order: Caryophyllales
- Family: Plumbaginaceae
- Genus: Limonium
- Species: L. bellidifolium

Binomial name
- Limonium bellidifolium (Gouan) Dumort.

= Limonium bellidifolium =

Species of flowering plant

Limonium bellidifolium, commonly known as the matted sea-lavender, is an aggregate species in the family Plumbaginaceae.

Despite the common name, matted sea-lavender is not related to the lavenders, but is a perennial herb with flowers with five petals in clusters. It occurs in the upper saltmarshes of Europe and southwest Asia and grows up to 30 cm tall from a rhizome.
