= Limonium sinense =

Scientific classification
- Kingdom: Plantae
- Clade: Tracheophytes
- Clade: Angiosperms
- Clade: Eudicots
- Order: Caryophyllales
- Family: Plumbaginaceae
- Genus: Limonium
- Species: L. sinense

Binomial name
- Limonium sinense (Girard) Kuntze

Synonyms
- Limonium sinense var. spinulosum Y.Huang; Statice fortunei Lindl.; Statice sinensis Girard; Statice taxanthema Schult.

Species of plant

Limonium sinense is a species of flowering plant in the sea lavender genus Limonium, family Plumbaginaceae, native to coastal China, Taiwan, the Ryukyu Islands, and Vietnam. It is a perennial reaching 60 cm (24 in), found on sandy, salty shales next to the ocean. There are a large number of cultivars, with a wide variety of flower colors, created for the cut flower industry. Wild individuals have flowers with white sepals and yellow petals.
