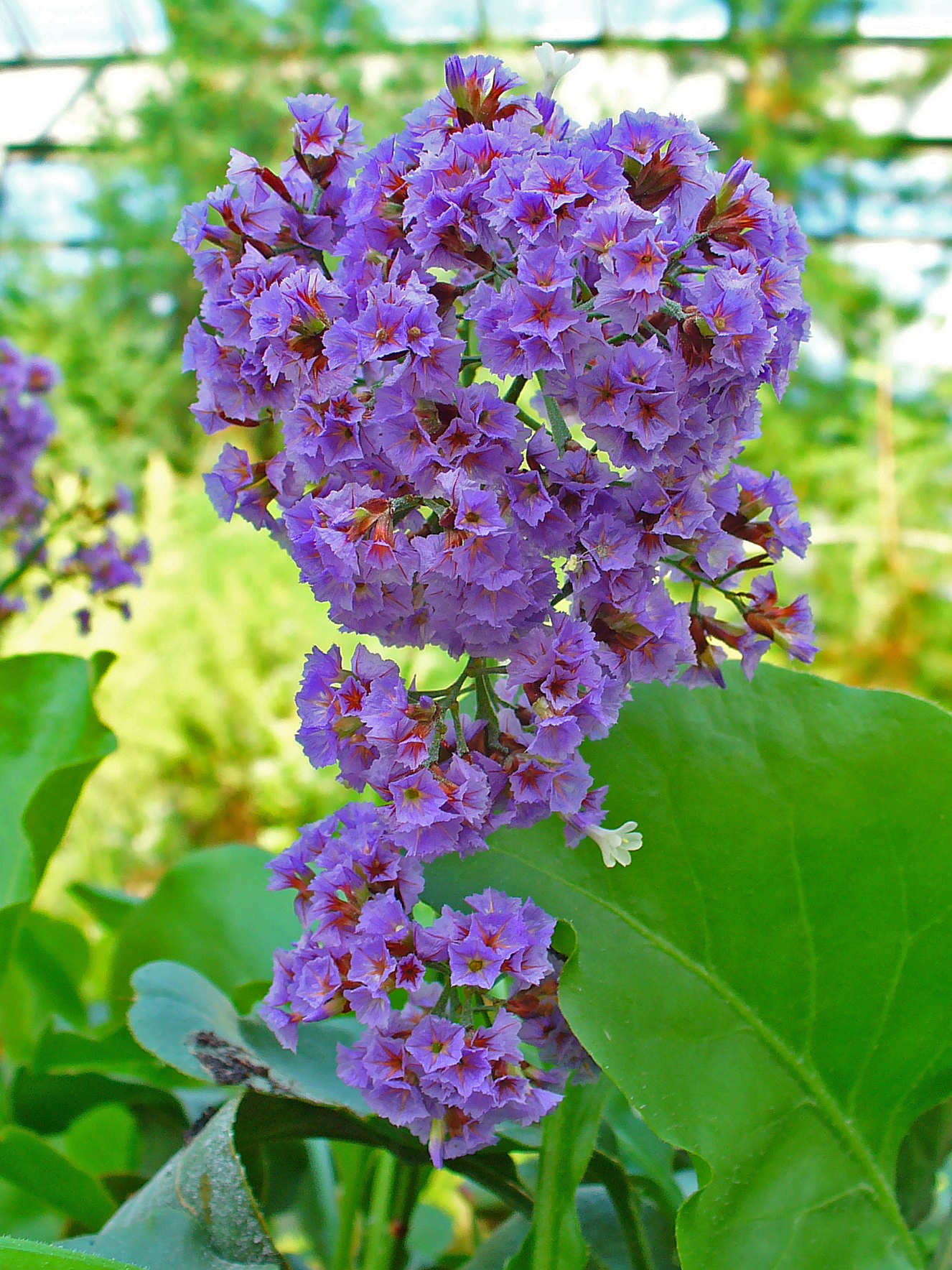
- Inflorescence

Conservation status
- Near Threatened (IUCN 3.1)

Scientific classification
- Kingdom: Plantae
- Clade: Tracheophytes
- Clade: Angiosperms
- Clade: Eudicots
- Order: Caryophyllales
- Family: Plumbaginaceae
- Genus: Limonium
- Species: L. arboreum

Binomial name
- Limonium arboreum (Willd.) Erben, A.Santos & Reyes-Bet.

Synonyms
- Limonium arborescens Kuntze; Statice arborea Willd.; Statice arborescens Brouss. ex Webb & Berthel.

= Limonium arboreum =

Species of flowering plant

Limonium arboreum is a species of sea lavender known by the common name tree limonium and siempreviva. It is endemic to the Canary Islands, where it is a plant of coastal habitat.

== Description ==
This is a tough perennial herb growing from a woody rhizome. The thick leaves are oval in shape and up to about 30 centimeters long including the petioles, located in a basal rosette about the stem. The inflorescence is a stiff, branching panicle often exceeding a meter tall bearing large clusters of flowers. The flowers have lavender sepals and smaller white petals.

It is also known from coastal southern California, where it is a non-native landscaping escapee which can occasionally be seen growing around beaches and roadsides.

Mr George Penny of the Milford Nursery, was the first to cultivate of the Statice arborea in 1838 in the UK after it was sent from the Canary Islands. It had been sold originally for the high price of 25 guineas.

It was first published as Limonium arboreum in Fl. Medit. 22: 65 in 2012.
