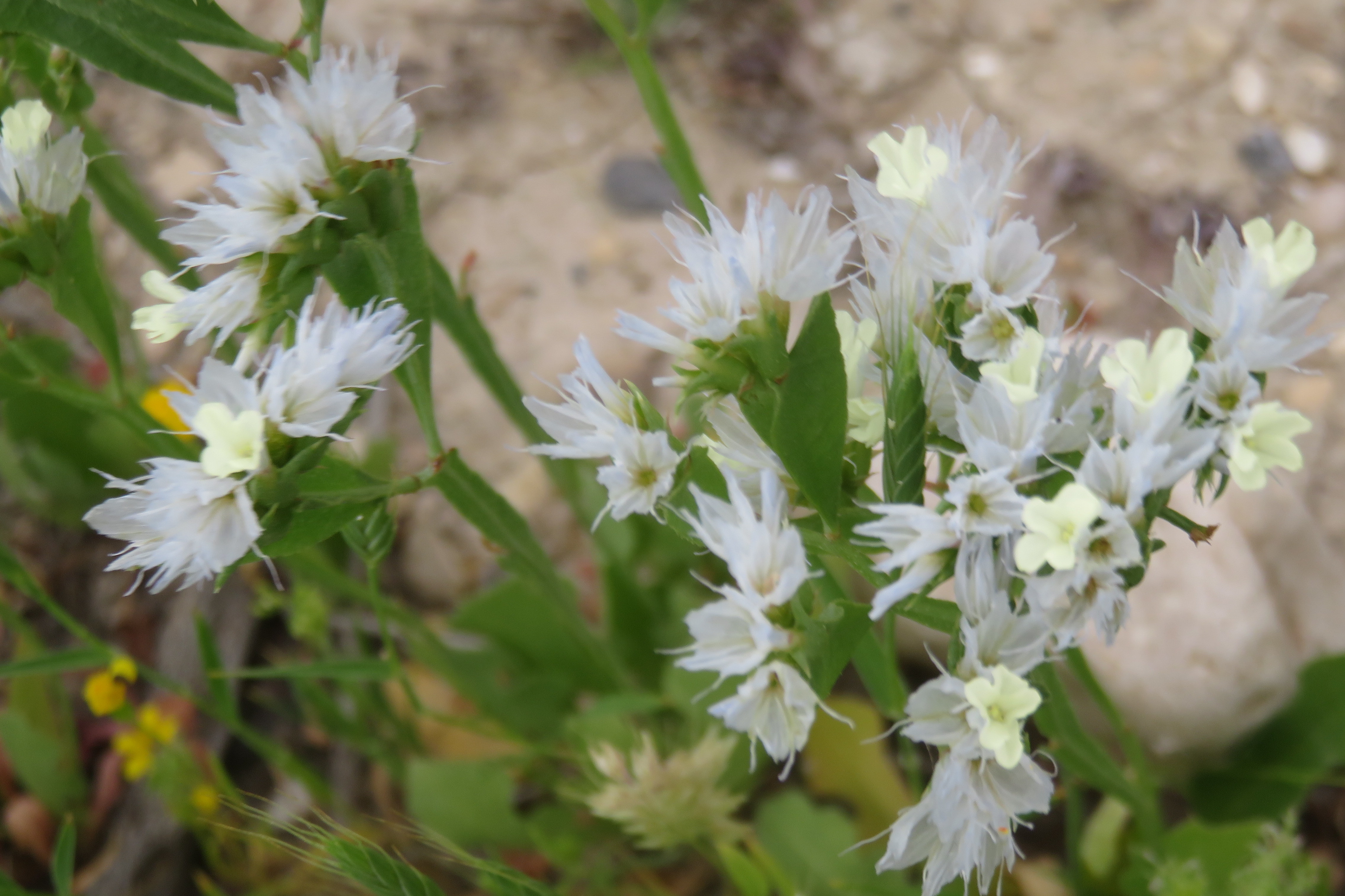
- Flowers range from white to pale blue

Scientific classification
- Kingdom: Plantae
- Clade: Tracheophytes
- Clade: Angiosperms
- Clade: Eudicots
- Order: Caryophyllales
- Family: Plumbaginaceae
- Genus: Limonium
- Species: L. lobatum

Binomial name
- Limonium lobatum (L.f.) Chaz.

Synonyms
- List: Limonium thouinii (Viv.) Kuntze; Linczevskia thouinii (Viv.) Tzvelev; Statice aegyptiaca Pers.; Statice alata Willd.; Statice cuneata Sm. ex Link; Statice lobata L.f.; Statice thouinii Viv.; Statice tripteris Poir.; Taxanthema aegyptiacum Sweet; Taxanthema alatum Sweet; Taxanthema thouinii (Viv.) Sweet

= Limonium lobatum =

Species of plant

Limonium lobatum, the winged sea-lavender, is a species of flowering plant in the family Plumbaginaceae, native to the Canary Islands, Spain, Greece, North Africa, and the Middle East as far as Iran. It is an incipient invasive in Australia.
