= Limonium lilacinum =

Scientific classification
- Kingdom: Plantae
- Clade: Tracheophytes
- Clade: Angiosperms
- Clade: Eudicots
- Order: Caryophyllales
- Family: Plumbaginaceae
- Genus: Limonium
- Species: L. lilacinum

Binomial name
- Limonium lilacinum (Boiss. & Balansa) Wagenitz

Species of plant

Limonium lilacinum is a Turkish species of flowering plant that usually occurs in central Anatolia. Limonium lilacinums local name in Turkey is "camel ear" or "barren lavender". Limonium lilacinum is a member of Limonium, the most common genus of the Plumbaginaceae family, which usually grows in salty soil. The Plumbaginaceae family has six genera in Turkey and Limonium is one of them. Many members of the family are of great importance in the medical, ecological, and ornamental plant industry. Limonium is a genus which is widespread around the world. There are around 600 species of this genus in the world. Limonium has 21 species in Turkey, and 9 of them are endemic, including Limonium lilacinum.

== Description ==
Limonium lilacinum is an herbaceous perennial with a number of 2n = 36 chromosomes. It has a thick, small-branch body that is 20-30 cm long. The leaves are widely elliptical or rectangular shaped, 6-20 x 3-5 cm wide, blunt, or sharp. The sepals are branched in the middle or above, showing branching between the false umbrella or the compound emit. The bass is very short and dense. The basins are 2-4 flowers, 4-5 mm long. The outer brackets are wide-bristled, 1 to 1.4 mm long, wide-bristled, similar to the outer one on the first inside bracket and twice the length and almost the edge of the cucumber, rectangular-inverted egg on the second bracket is 3 times the length of the outer one, with a large membrane edge. Kaliks 3,5-5 mm, inverse conical to funnel, limb 5-lobe, lobes are rounded. Petals are violet-colored. Limonium lilacinum blooms between June and September at 900-1200 m heights. The most efficient environment for the germination of this plant species is semi-luminous. They bloom in a semi-luminous environment in 5 days and bloom in a dark environment in 7 days.

== Uses ==
While the fresh leaves of Limonium lilacinum are being eaten by animals, dried flowers are used locally by Turks as medicines. The dried flower branches of this species are also used as filling materials in the flower shop. The type used in the ornamental plant and pharmaceutical industry is also beneficial to edema disease. It helps to reduce bladder stones and relieve spasms and pains. It has been reported that it helps to spill sand and stones that accumulate in the urinary tract, which cleans the blood and removes harmful substances that accumulate in the body, and addresses complaints of rheumatism and nicricin. The presence of Limonium lilacinum usually located the edge of Lake Tuz and this situation is a risk for the continuation of the species. Because in these areas, especially agriculture, grazing activities, cultural and social threats, human activities, heavy metal pollution and climate factors are harmful for the natural environment. An endemic species, Limonium lilacinum, is in danger category “can be damaged” according to the Red List of endangered species.

== The Germination Features of Endemic Limonium lilacinum ==
The species included in this study are included in the Flora of Turkey records. according to Limonium genus Sphaerostachys located in the section. As a result of the experiments L. The germination ability of lilacinum seeds is very found to be good. Especially in semi-light. 95% of seeds on day 5 at ambient room conditions germinated, on the 7th day in a permanent dark environment has completed its germination. Similar result for L. stocksii by Zia and Khan (2004) has reported. Temel and Tokur (2005) 13 Origanum In his study on the L. (Lamiaceae) taxon bright environment promotes germination more they have detected. Yıldız et al. (2008) L. what they did on iconicum and L. lilacinum In the study, both types of light stimulated germination. they have detected. Also Baskin and Baskin (1998) revealed the necessity of light for 23 halophytic species. they have put. Tilki and Kebeşoğlu (2009) is Paliurus. spina-christi Mill. and Punica granatum L. germination barrier sulfuric acid+cold-moist folding they have removed the pre-processes as a result of the application. As a result, our study material, L. lilacinum in a short time without any pre-treatment and highly germinated. This type of situation not destroying their natural habitats provided that the reproductive trait is good and that there is no risk of reproduction by seed The short title to be given as a header on the page should be written with spaces not exceeding 100 characters, Author surname et al. BATTERY FEBID 12 (2012) 011006 52 shows. However, the natural distribution of the plant Akarçay Basin industry, thermal hotels and a threat of rapid construction for the residential area below. EIA to prevent invasion in these areas requesting a report and obtaining a building permit accordingly. endangerment of the species preventable. In addition, Crop Production General Among the duties of the Directorate are “Meadows, pastures, Rehabilitation and conservation of pastures and winter quarters provide, protect and take the necessary measures” takes. Duties and duties of relevant institutions and organizations if it fulfills its responsibilities extinction of L. lilacinum, an endemic species will be preserved.
