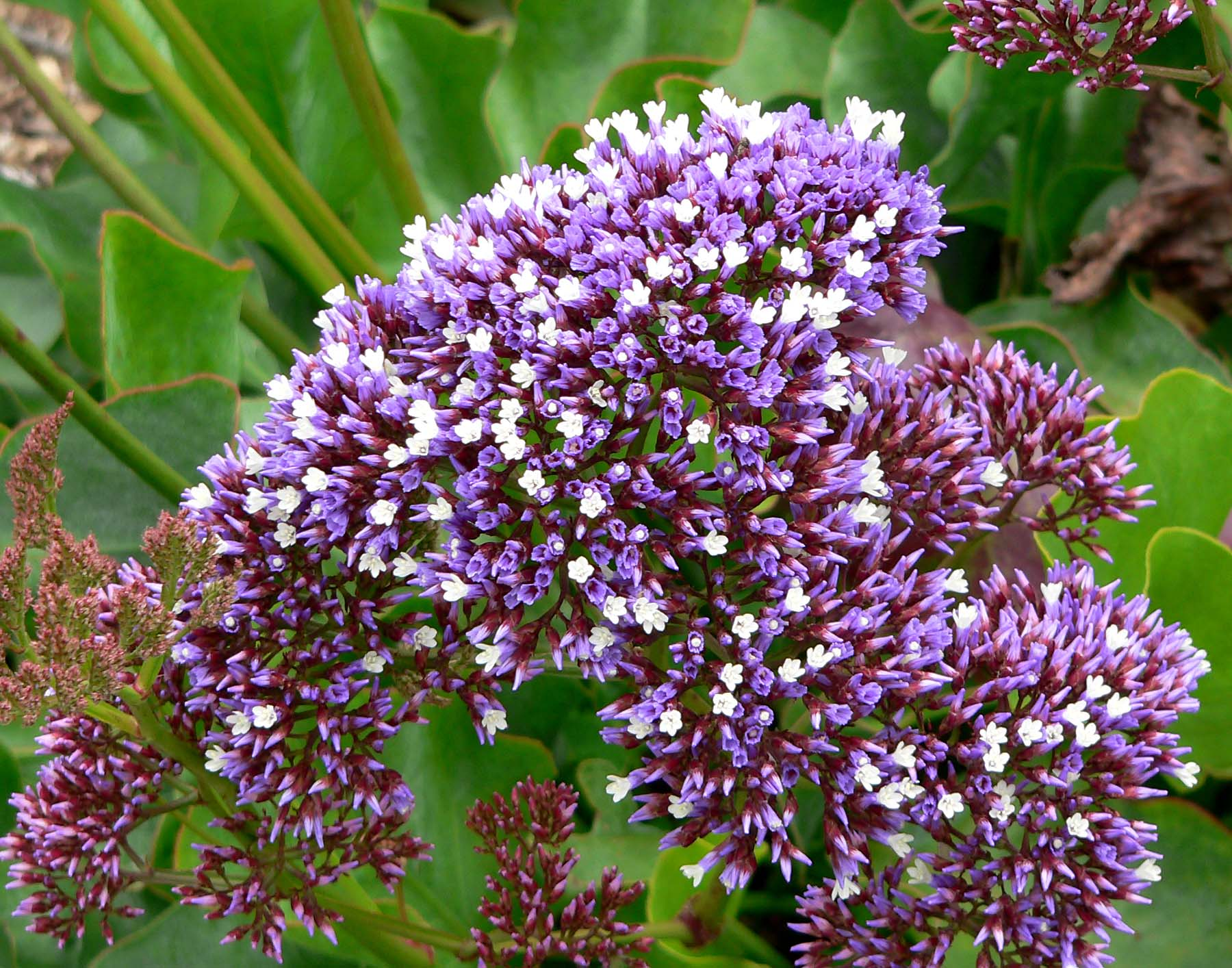

Conservation status
- Vulnerable (IUCN 3.1)

Scientific classification
- Kingdom: Plantae
- Clade: Tracheophytes
- Clade: Angiosperms
- Clade: Eudicots
- Order: Caryophyllales
- Family: Plumbaginaceae
- Genus: Limonium
- Species: L. perezii

Binomial name
- Limonium perezii (Stapf) F.T.Hubbard

= Limonium perezii =

Species of flowering plant

Limonium perezii is a species of Limonium known by the common names Perez's sea lavender and seafoam statice. It is also known as simply statice (reflecting the former name of the genus), sea lavender or marsh rosemary (common names for the genus). It is native to the coasts of the Canary Islands but are widely used in gardens throughout the world.

== Description ==
This is a tough perennial herb growing from a woody rhizome. The thick leaves are oval to round in shape and up to about 30 centimeters (12 in) long including the petioles, located in a basal rosette about the stem. The inflorescence is a stiff, branching panicle 15 to 45 centimeters (5.9 to 17.7 in) tall, topped with bushy clusters of flowers. The small flower has lavender sepals and white petals.

== Naming ==
As a widely used garden plant, it is often referred to by the common names Perez's sea lavender and seafoam statice, as well as variations on the name of the genus (former name Statice, current name Limonium and common names sea lavender and marsh rosemary). It may be referred to by the Afrikaans name papierblom or the common name everlasting in South Africa.

== Origin and distribution ==
Limonium perezii is native to the Canary Islands, but widely cultivated as a garden plant.
