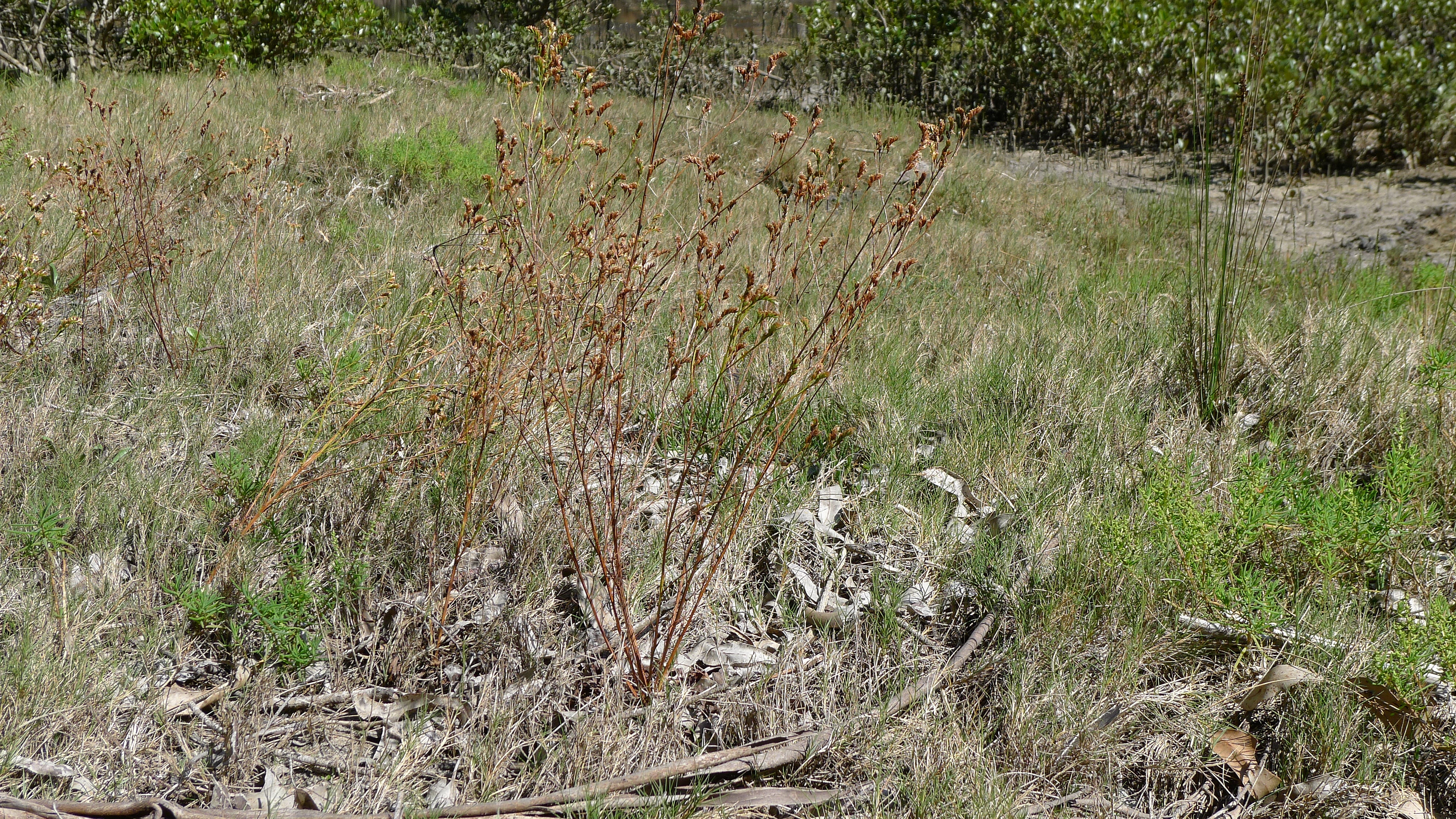

Scientific classification
- Kingdom: Plantae
- Clade: Tracheophytes
- Clade: Angiosperms
- Clade: Eudicots
- Order: Caryophyllales
- Family: Plumbaginaceae
- Genus: Limonium
- Species: L. australe

Binomial name
- Limonium australe Kuntze

= Limonium australe =

Species of flowering plant

Limonium australe is a species of sea lavender known by the common name native sea lavender. It is native to Australia, where it is known to inhabit saltmarshes and mud flats along the eastern coast from northern Tasmania to Mackay in Queensland.
