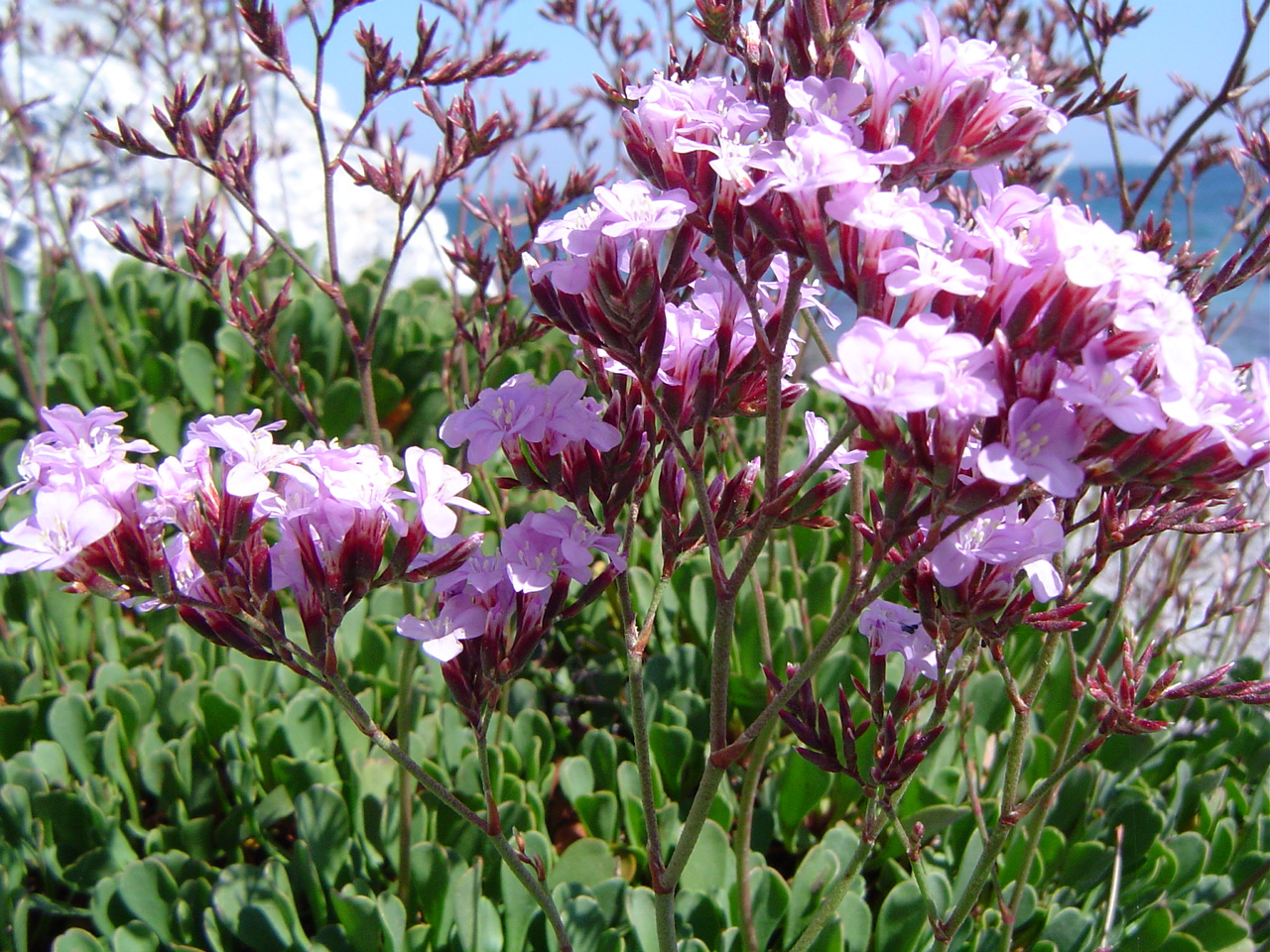

Scientific classification
- Kingdom: Plantae
- Clade: Tracheophytes
- Clade: Angiosperms
- Clade: Eudicots
- Order: Caryophyllales
- Family: Plumbaginaceae
- Genus: Limonium
- Species: L. emarginatum

Binomial name
- Limonium emarginatum (Willd.) Kuntze

= Limonium emarginatum =

Species of flowering plant

Limonium emarginatum is a species of sea lavender known by the common names Gibraltar sea lavender.

== Description ==
This evergreen is native to southern Spain, Ceuta, Morocco and Gibraltar around the Straits of Gibraltar. The plant creates clumps that are 25 cm high and 50 cm in diameter.
