= Limonium paulayanum =

Conservation status
- Least Concern (IUCN 3.1)

Scientific classification
- Kingdom: Plantae
- Clade: Tracheophytes
- Clade: Angiosperms
- Clade: Eudicots
- Order: Caryophyllales
- Family: Plumbaginaceae
- Genus: Limonium
- Species: L. paulayanum

Binomial name
- Limonium paulayanum (Vierh.) Ghaz. & J.R.Edm. (2003)

Synonyms
- Limonium kossmatii (R.Wagner & Vierh.) Verdc. & Hemming ex Cufod. (1969); Statice kossmatii R.Wagner & Vierh. (1905); Statice paulayana Vierh. (1905)

Species of flowering plant

Limonium paulayanum is a species of plant in the family Plumbaginaceae. It is a subshrub or shrub endemic to Yemen's Socotra Archipelago, where it is native to the islands of Socotra, Samhah, and Abd al Kuri. Its grows in coastal dwarf shrubland and on inland cliffs and rocky areas, from sea level to 550 metres elevation.
