= Limonium zeraphae =

Scientific classification
- Kingdom: Plantae
- Clade: Tracheophytes
- Clade: Angiosperms
- Clade: Eudicots
- Order: Caryophyllales
- Family: Plumbaginaceae
- Genus: Limonium
- Species: L. zeraphae

Binomial name
- Limonium zeraphae Brullo

Species of plant

Limonium zeraphae is a species of plants in the family Plumbaginaceae (leadworts). It is endemic to Malta.

== Sources ==
This article incorporates text from a free content work. Licensed under CC0 (license statement/permission). Text taken from Limonium zerapha. Encyclopedia of Life.
