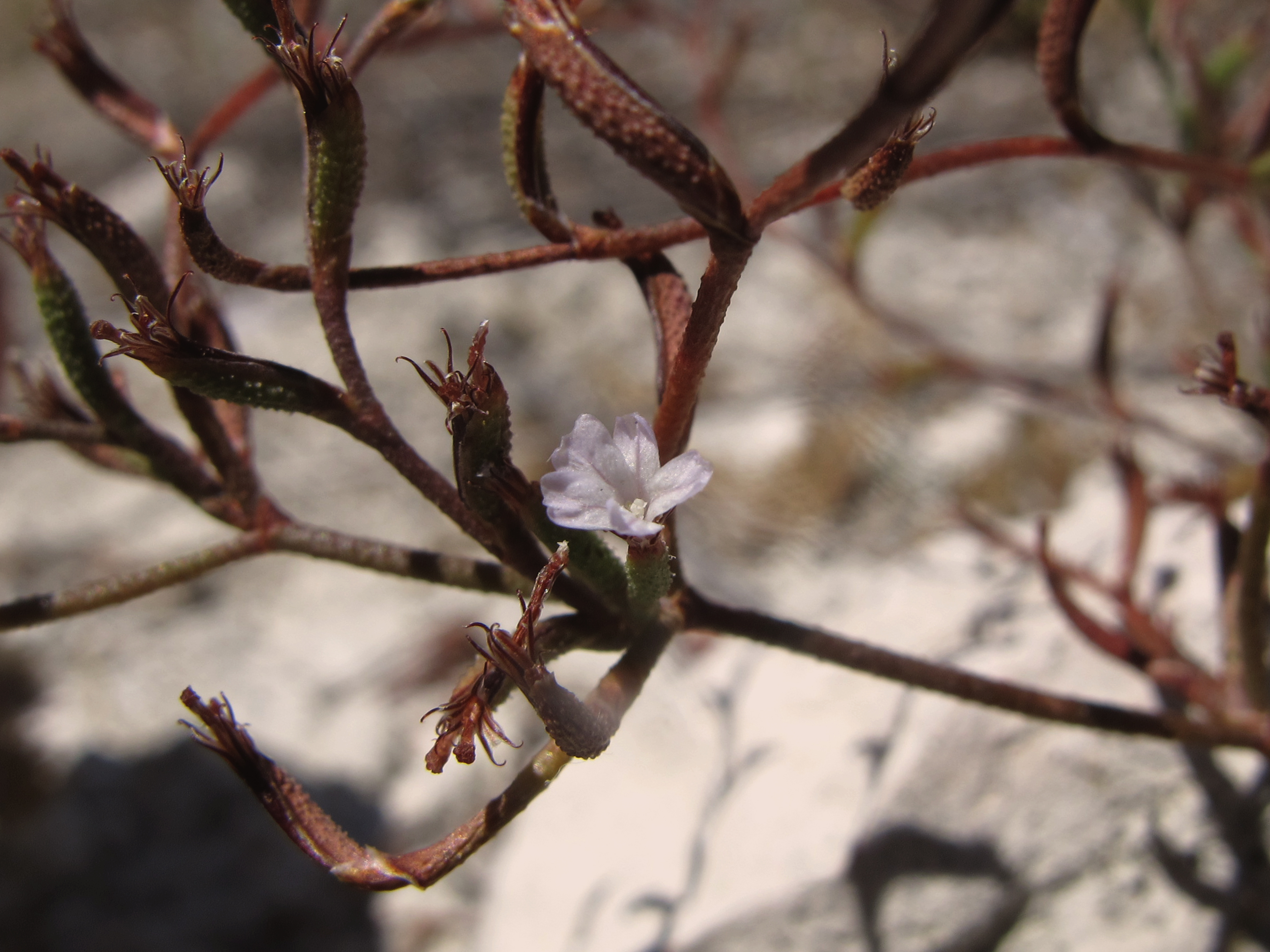

Scientific classification
- Kingdom: Plantae
- Clade: Tracheophytes
- Clade: Angiosperms
- Clade: Eudicots
- Order: Caryophyllales
- Family: Plumbaginaceae
- Genus: Limonium
- Species: L. virgatum

Binomial name
- Limonium virgatum (Willd.) Fourr.

Synonyms
- Limonium oleifolium

= Limonium virgatum =

Species of plant

Limonium virgatum is a species of plants in the family Plumbaginaceae (leadworts). Individuals can grow to 17 cm tall.

== Sources ==
This article incorporates text from a free content work. Licensed under CC0 (license statement/permission). Text taken from Limonium virgatum. Encyclopedia of Life.
