= Limonium sokotranum =

Conservation status
- Least Concern (IUCN 3.1)

Scientific classification
- Kingdom: Plantae
- Clade: Tracheophytes
- Clade: Angiosperms
- Clade: Eudicots
- Order: Caryophyllales
- Family: Plumbaginaceae
- Genus: Limonium
- Species: L. sokotranum

Binomial name
- Limonium sokotranum (Vierh.) Radcl.-Sm. (1971)

Synonyms
- Statice sokotrana Vierh. (1905)

Species of flowering plant

Limonium sokotranum is a species of plant in the family Plumbaginaceae. It is a subshrub or shrub endemic to Yemen's Socotra Archipelago, where it is native to the islands of Socotra, Samhah, and Abd al Kuri. Its grows in coastal dwarf shrubland and inland cliffs and rocky areas from sea-level to 550 metres elevation.
