= Limonium solanderi =

Scientific classification
- Kingdom: Plantae
- Clade: Tracheophytes
- Clade: Angiosperms
- Clade: Eudicots
- Order: Caryophyllales
- Family: Plumbaginaceae
- Genus: Limonium
- Species: L. solanderi

Binomial name
- Limonium solanderi Lincz.

Species of flowering plant

Limonium solanderi is a species of flowering plant in the family Plumbaginaceae. It is sometimes referred to by the common name native sea lavender and is native to the Australia, where it is known to inhabit salt marshes and estuaries along the eastern coast from Brisbane to Townsville in Queensland. It has small yellow flowers

The plant was originally collected by Sir Joseph Banks. His specimens are still held by the British Museum
