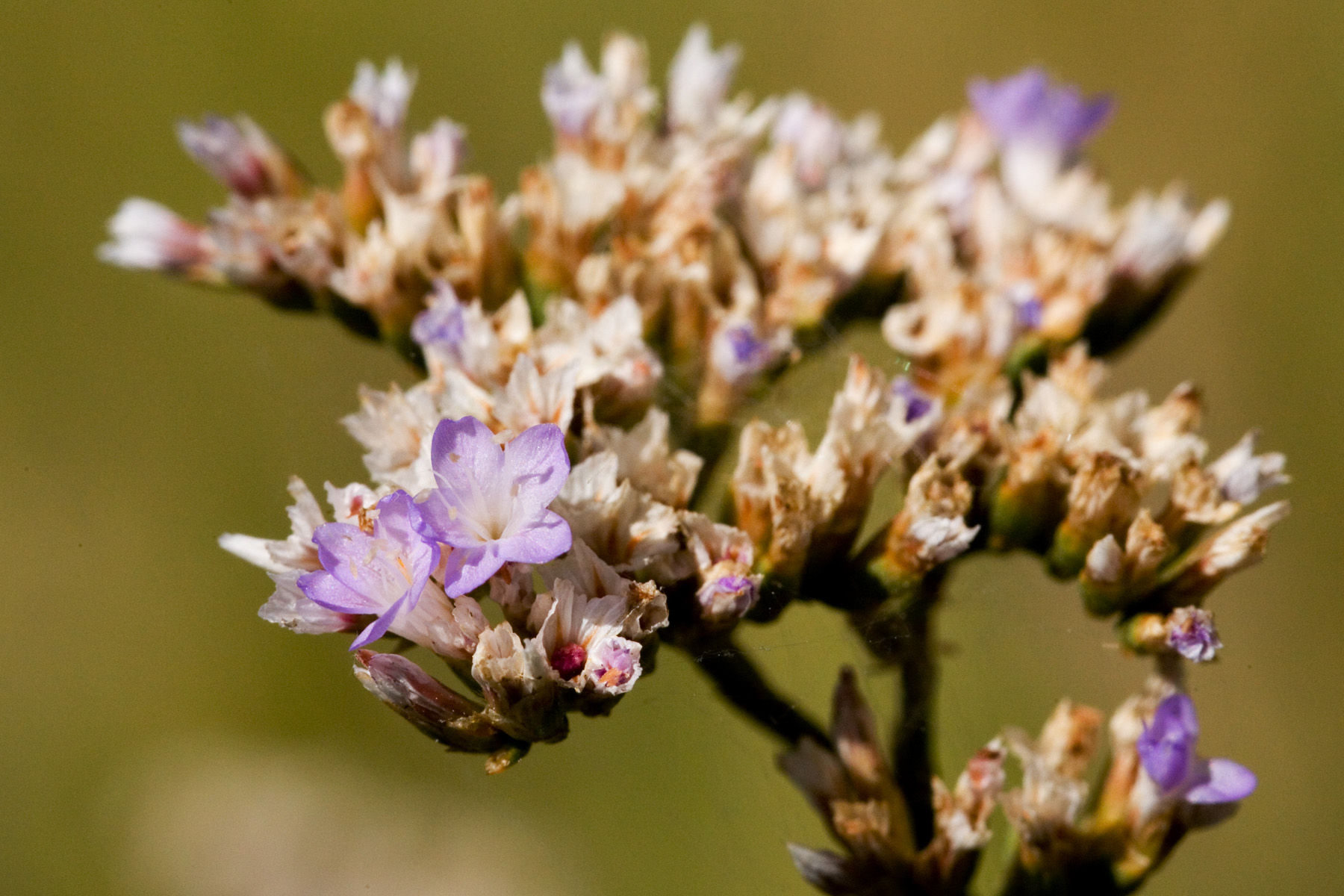

Scientific classification
- Kingdom: Plantae
- Clade: Tracheophytes
- Clade: Angiosperms
- Clade: Eudicots
- Order: Caryophyllales
- Family: Plumbaginaceae
- Genus: Limonium
- Species: L. limbatum

Binomial name
- Limonium limbatum Small

Synonyms
- Limonium limbatum var. glabrescens Correll; Statice limbata (Small) K. Schum.

= Limonium limbatum =

Species of plant

Limonium limbatum, common names trans-pecos sea-lavender or desert sea-lavender, is a plant species native to the southwestern United States (Arizona, New Mexico, Texas and Oklahoma) and the Mexican State of Coahuila. Most of the 300 species of the genus are found on seashores and in marine salt marshes, but L. limbatum also grows on the shores of salt lakes and in alkaline depressions in desert areas, at elevations of 400–1800 m.

Limonium limbatum is a perennial herb with a large taproot, producing a rosette of leaves that are still alive at flowering time. Leaves are up to 17 cm long, thick and leathery. Flowering stalk is up to 100 cm tall, not winged, bearing flowers with whitish sepals and blue petals.
