= Limonium otolepis =

Scientific classification
- Kingdom: Plantae
- Clade: Tracheophytes
- Clade: Angiosperms
- Clade: Eudicots
- Order: Caryophyllales
- Family: Plumbaginaceae
- Genus: Limonium
- Species: L. otolepis

Binomial name
- Limonium otolepis (Schrenk) Kuntze

Synonyms
- Statice otolepis Schrenk

Species of plant

Limonium otolepis, the saltmarsh sea lavender, lacy sea lavender or Asian sea lavender, is a species of flowering plant in the family Plumbaginaceae. It is native to Afghanistan, Central Asia, and Xinjiang and western Gansu in China. A halophyte, it is common in saline areas, such as the bed of the former Aral Sea. It has been introduced to California as a garden escapee, and is also present in southeastern Australia. There appears to be an ornamental cultivar, 'Lavender Lace'.
