= Limonium cosyrense =

Scientific classification
- Kingdom: Plantae
- Clade: Tracheophytes
- Clade: Angiosperms
- Clade: Eudicots
- Order: Caryophyllales
- Family: Plumbaginaceae
- Genus: Limonium
- Species: L. cosyrense

Binomial name
- Limonium cosyrense (Guss.) Kuntze

Synonyms
- Statice cosyrensis Guss.; Statice gracilis Tineo; Statice pygmaea Tineo; Statice tineoi J.Woods; Statice tineoi var. gracilis (Tineo) J.Woods; Statice tineoi var. pygmaea (Tineo) J.Woods

Species of plant

Limonium cosyrense is a species of flowering plant in the family Plumbaginaceae, native to Malta and Pantelleria. It is occasionally available from commercial suppliers.
