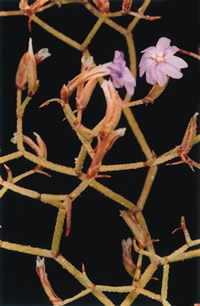

Conservation status
- Endangered (IUCN 3.1)

Scientific classification
- Kingdom: Plantae
- Clade: Tracheophytes
- Clade: Angiosperms
- Clade: Eudicots
- Order: Caryophyllales
- Family: Plumbaginaceae
- Genus: Limonium
- Species: L. strictissimum

Binomial name
- Limonium strictissimum (Salzmann) Arrigoni

= Limonium strictissimum =

Species of flowering plant

Limonium strictissimum is a species of plant in the family Plumbaginaceae. It is endemic to the island of Sardinia in Italy. Its natural habitat is Mediterranean-type shrubby vegetation. It is threatened by habitat loss.
