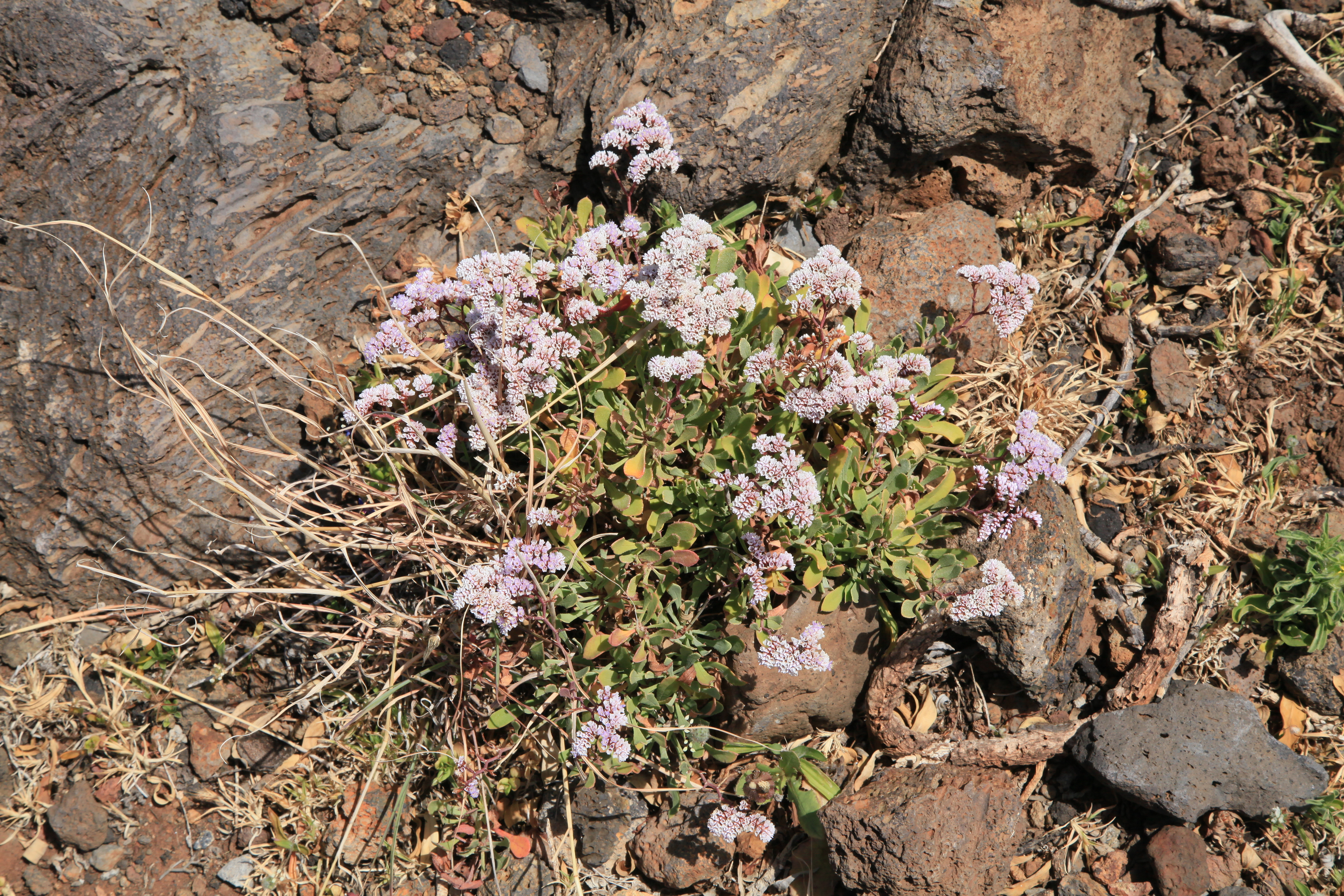
- In habitat, Garafía, La Palma

Scientific classification
- Kingdom: Plantae
- Clade: Tracheophytes
- Clade: Angiosperms
- Clade: Eudicots
- Order: Caryophyllales
- Family: Plumbaginaceae
- Genus: Limonium
- Species: L. pectinatum

Binomial name
- Limonium pectinatum (Aiton) Kuntze

= Limonium pectinatum =

Species of flowering plant

Limonium pectinatum is a species of flowering plant in the family Plumbaginaceae, native to the Canary Islands.

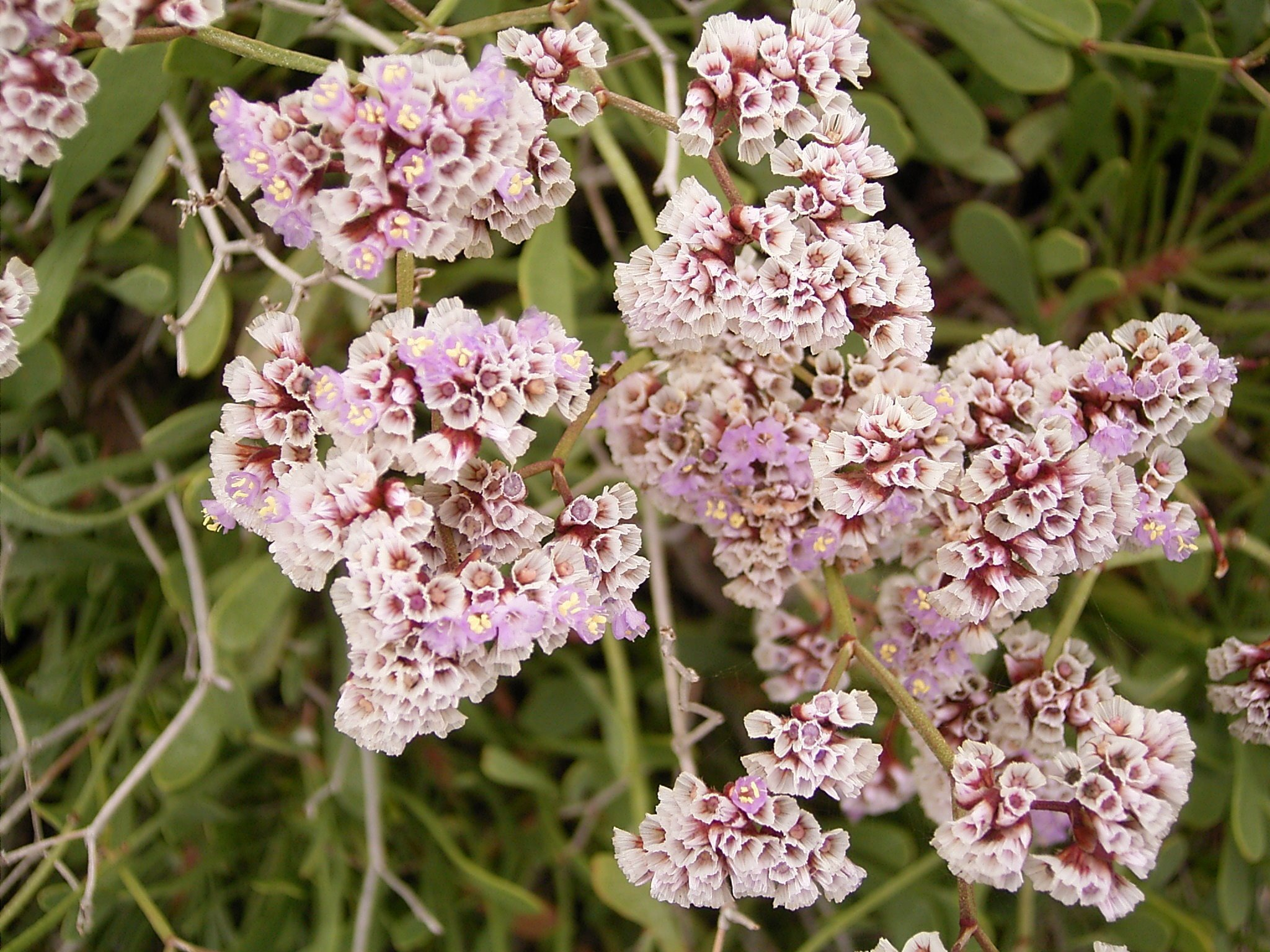
Flowers
