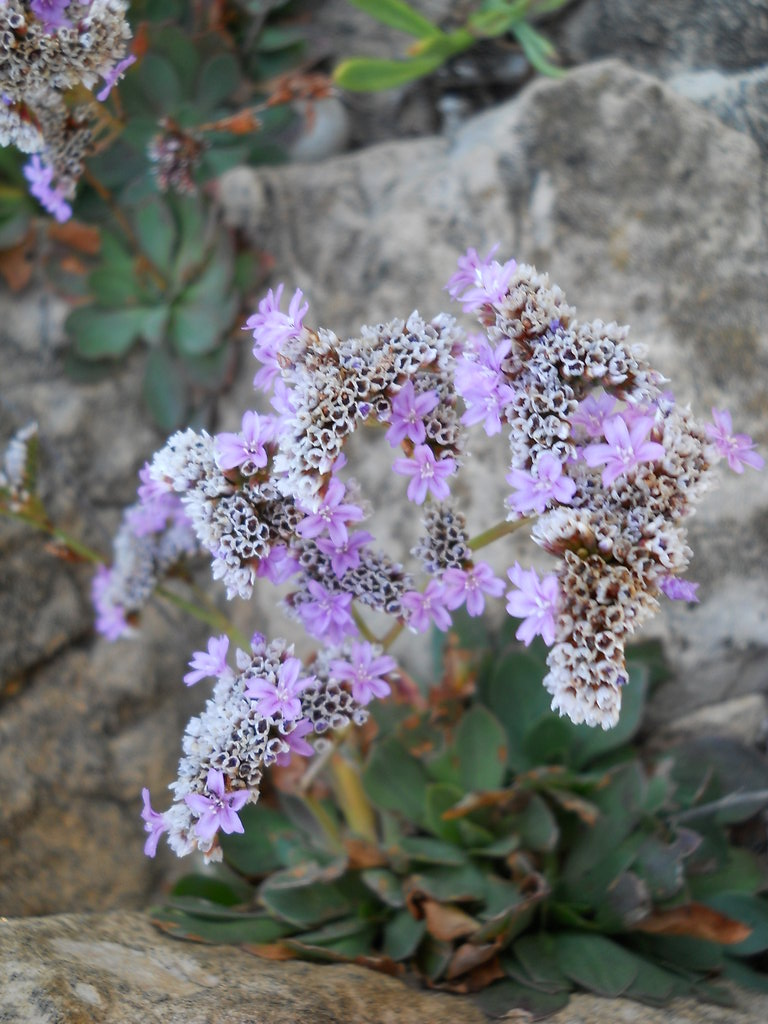
- Specimen at Cabo Raso

Conservation status
- Least Concern (IUCN 3.1)

- Least Concern (IUCN 3.1)

Scientific classification
- Kingdom: Plantae
- Clade: Tracheophytes
- Clade: Angiosperms
- Clade: Eudicots
- Order: Caryophyllales
- Family: Plumbaginaceae
- Genus: Limonium
- Species: L. multiflorum

Binomial name
- Limonium multiflorum Erben

Synonyms
- Limonium binervosum subsp. multiflorum Pignatti; Statice densiflora var. lusitanica Daveau; Limonium auriculaeursifolium subsp. multiflorum Pignatti; Limonium dodartii subsp. lusitanicum (Daveau) Franco

= Limonium multiflorum =

Species of plant

Limonium multiflorum is a species of sea-lavender endemic to central-west Portugal, where it inhabits rocky and sandy areas.

== Description ==
Flowers are 6.3–7.2 mm (0.25–0.28 in) in diameter and petals are purplish-reddish.
