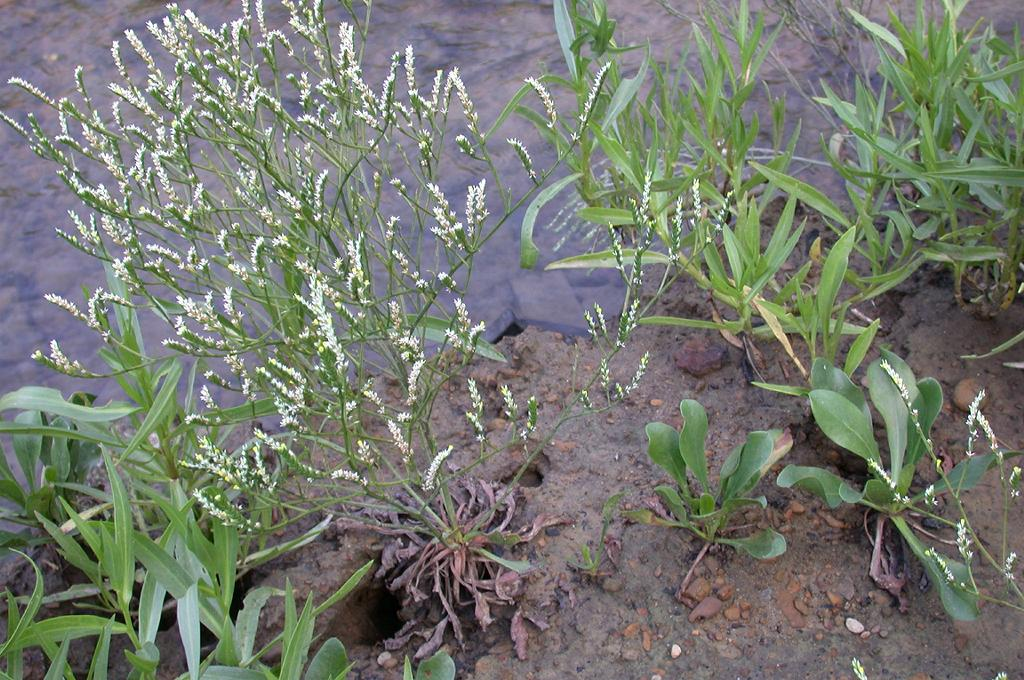
- One and two-year old plants. Note that the leaves of the flowering individual have senesced.
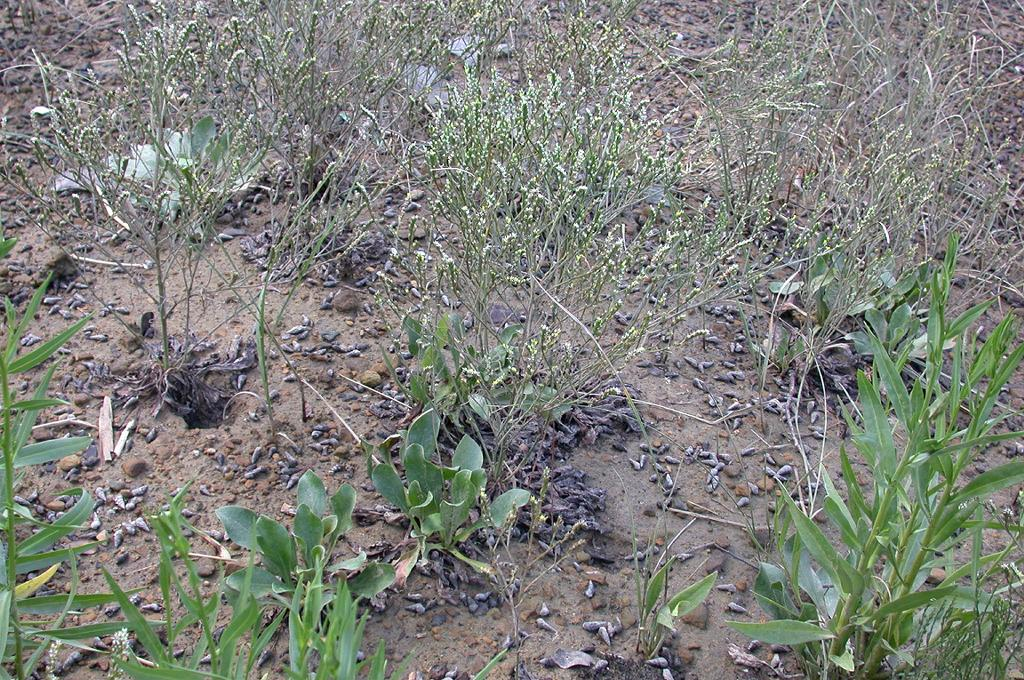
- In Japan, with seashells

Scientific classification
- Kingdom: Plantae
- Clade: Tracheophytes
- Clade: Angiosperms
- Clade: Eudicots
- Order: Caryophyllales
- Family: Plumbaginaceae
- Genus: Limonium
- Species: L. tetragonum

Binomial name
- Limonium tetragonum (Thunb.) Bullock

Synonyms
- Limonium japonicum (Siebold & Zucc.) Kuntze; Statice japonica Siebold & Zucc.; Statice tetragona Thunb.; Taxanthema tetragonum (Thunb.) Sweet

= Limonium tetragonum =

Species of plant

Limonium tetragonum, the square-stalked sea lavender, is a species of flowering plant in the family Plumbaginaceae. It is native to Primorsky Krai in Russia, South Korea, central and southern Japan, the northern Ryukyu Islands, and New Caledonia some 6,800 km (4,200 mi) away. A biennial halophyte, it can be found growing at the high tide line in coastal wetlands and in salt marshes. It is collected in the wild and eaten as a vegetable, and is considered to have medicinal properties. There appears to be an ornamental cultivar, 'Confetti'.
