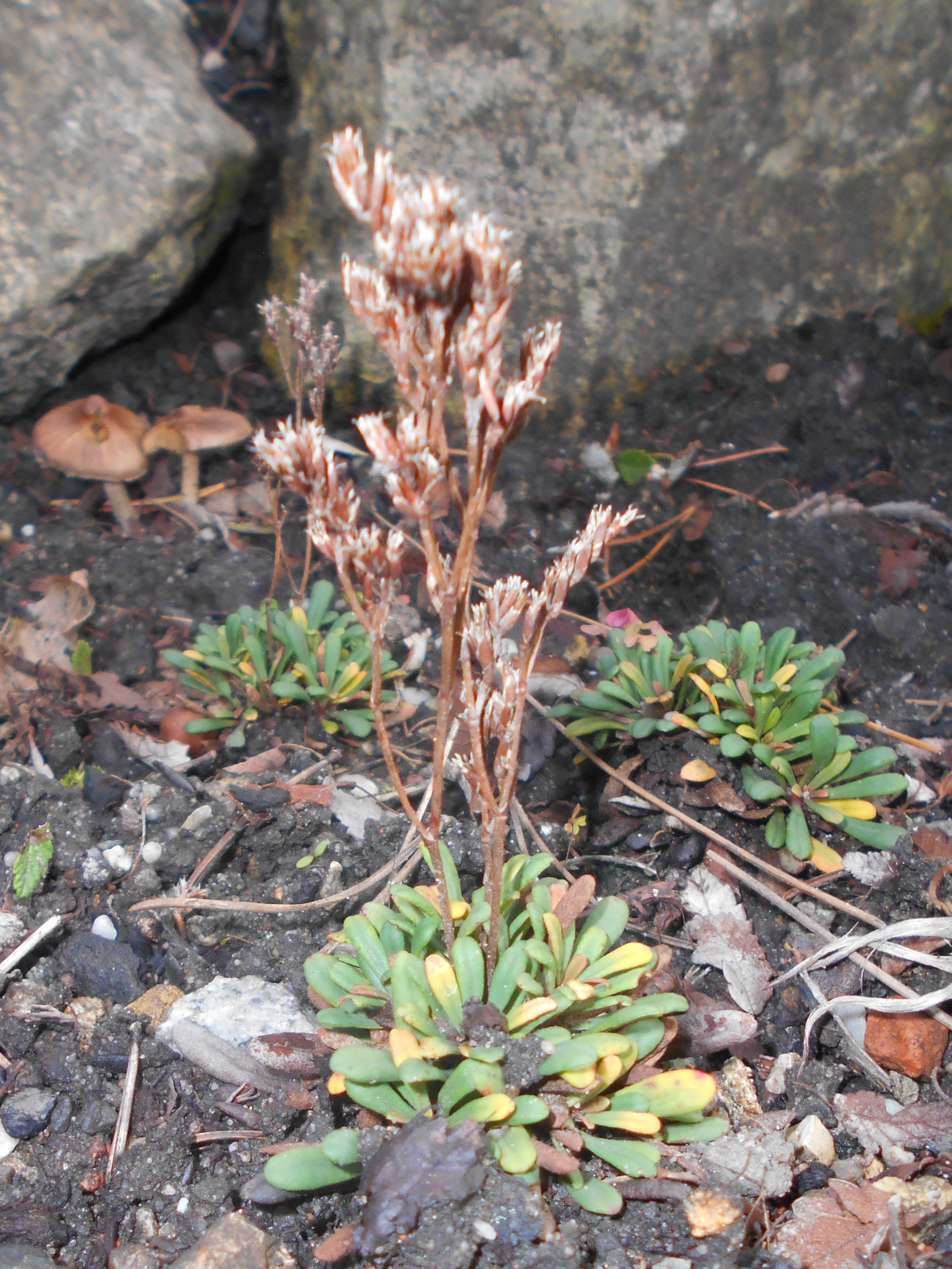
- In bloom
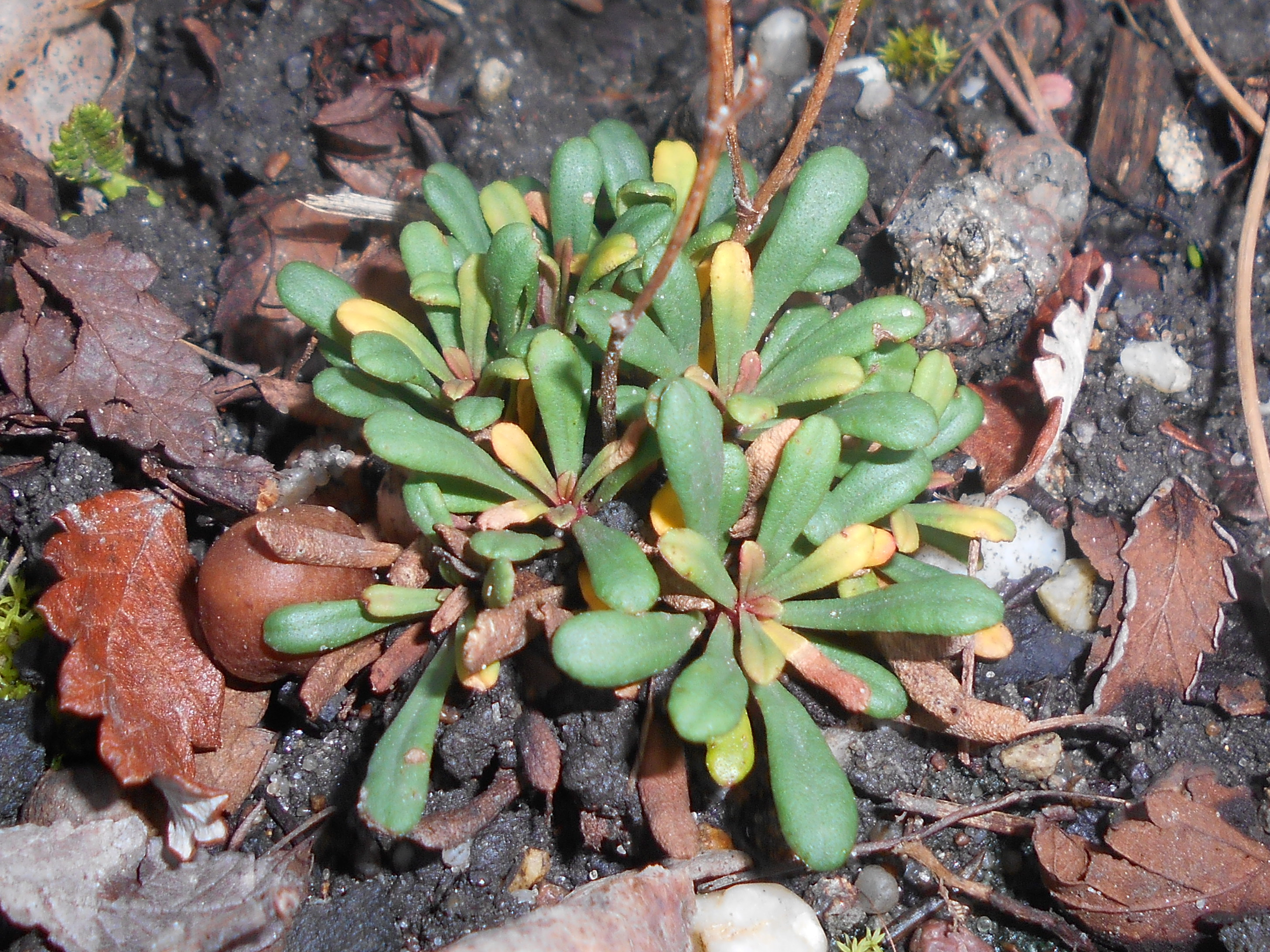
- Close up of rosettes

Scientific classification
- Kingdom: Plantae
- Clade: Tracheophytes
- Clade: Angiosperms
- Clade: Eudicots
- Order: Caryophyllales
- Family: Plumbaginaceae
- Genus: Limonium
- Species: L. minutum

Binomial name
- Limonium minutum (L.) Chaz.

Synonyms
- Statice minuta L.; Statice minuta var. balearica Martelli; Statice virgata var. minuta (L.) Knoche; Taxanthema minutum (L.) Sweet

= Limonium minutum =

Species of plant

Limonium minutum, the dwarf statice, is a species of flowering plant in the family Plumbaginaceae, native to the Balearic Islands. A halophyte found in coastal habitats, it is occasionally available from commercial suppliers.
