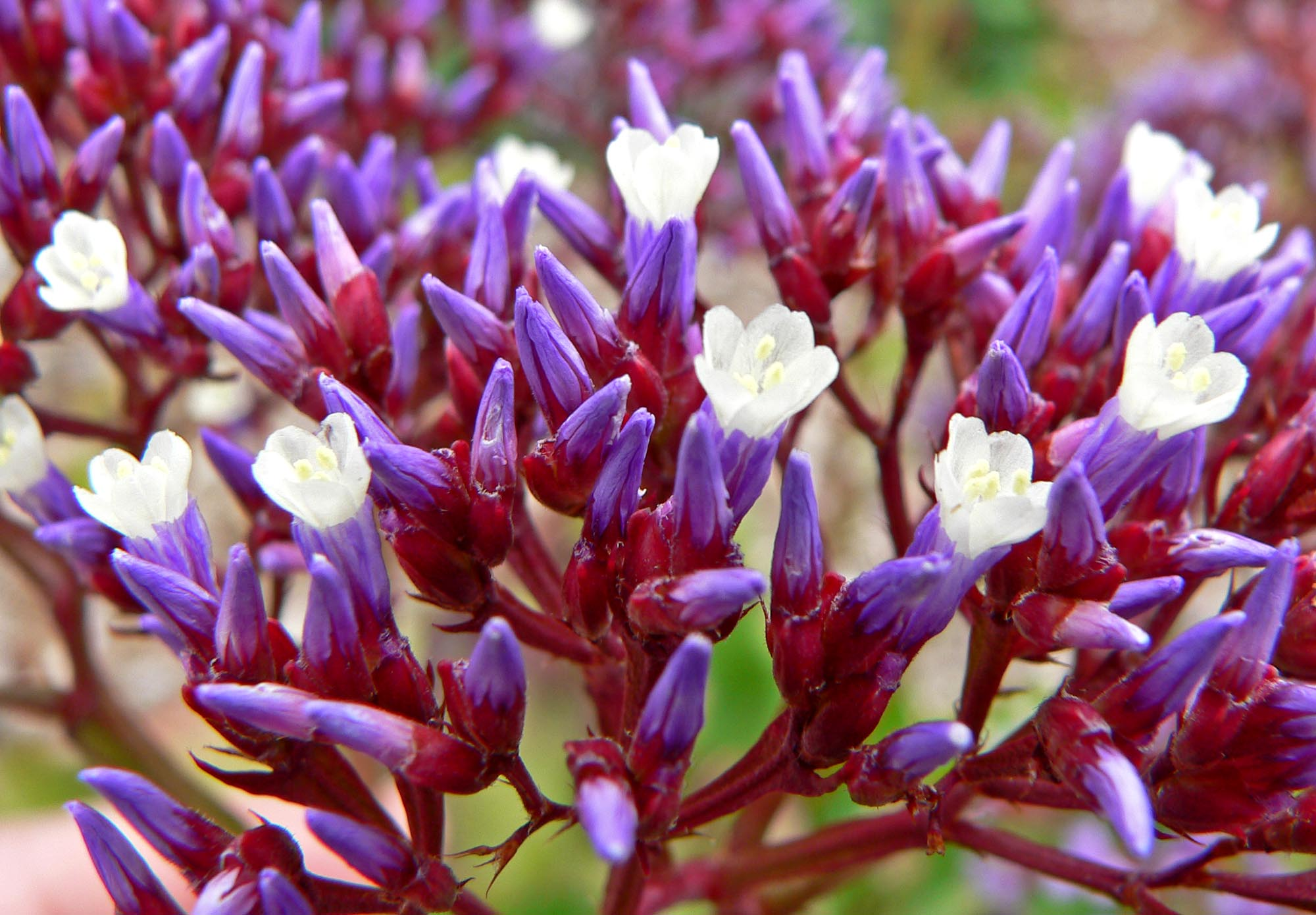
- Limonium perezii at the San Francisco Botanical Garden

Scientific classification
- Kingdom: Plantae
- Clade: Embryophytes
- Clade: Tracheophytes
- Clade: Angiosperms
- Clade: Eudicots
- Order: Caryophyllales
- Family: Plumbaginaceae
- Genus: Limonium; Mill.

Species
- About 600 species; see text

= Limonium =

Genus of flowering plants

Limonium is a genus of about 600 flowering plant species. Members are also known as sea-lavender, statice, caspia or marsh-rosemary. Despite their common names, species are not related to the lavenders or to rosemary. They are instead in Plumbaginaceae, the plumbago or leadwort family. The generic name is from the Latin līmōnion, used by Pliny for a wild plant and is ultimately derived from the Ancient Greek leimon (λειμών, 'meadow').

== Distribution ==
The genus has a subcosmopolitan distribution in Europe, Asia, Africa, North America and Australia. By far the greatest diversity (over 100 species) is in the area stretching from the Canary Islands east through the Mediterranean region to central Asia; for comparison, North America only has three native Limonium species.

== Description ==
Sea-lavenders normally grow as herbaceous perennial plants, growing 10–70 cm tall from a rhizome; a few (mainly from the Canary Islands) are woody shrubs up to 2 metres tall. Many species flourish in saline soils, and are therefore common near coasts and in salt marshes, and also on saline, gypsum and alkaline soils in continental interiors.

The leaves are simple, entire to lobed, and from 1–30 cm long and 0.5–10 cm broad; most of the leaves are produced in a dense basal rosette, with the flowering stems bearing only small brown scale-leaves (bracts). The flowers are produced on a branched panicle or corymb, the individual flowers are small (4–10 mm long) with a five-lobed calyx and corolla, and five stamens; the flower colour is pink or violet to purple in most species, white or yellow in a few. Many of the species are apomictic. The fruit is a small capsule containing a single seed, partly enclosed by the persistent calyx.

== Features ==
Several species are popular garden flowers; they are generally known to gardeners as statices. They are grown both for their flowers and for the appearance of the calyx, which remains on the plant after the true flowers have fallen, and are known as "everlasting flowers".

== Species ==
There are about 600 species in the genus, many of them local endemic species with a very restricted range. Species not given a common name here are generally referred to simply as "sea-lavender", "statice," or "marsh-rosemary".

- Limonium aragonense (Monegros, endemic)
- Limonium arboreum (tree limonium or Statice arborea; Tenerife, endemic)
- Limonium aureum (central Asia: Siberia, Mongolia, northwest China)
- Limonium auriculaeursifolium (Alderney sea-lavender; southwest Europe, northwest Africa)
- Limonium australe (Australia)
- Limonium bellidifolium (matted sea-lavender; Europe, southwest Asia)
- Limonium bicolor (Mongolia, northwest China)
- Limonium binervosum (rock sea-lavender; western Europe)
- Limonium bourgeaui (Lanzarote, endemic)
- Limonium brassicifolium (Canary Islands, Statice brassicifolia)
- Limonium braunii (Cape Verde)
- Limonium brunneri (Cape Verde)
- Limonium caesium (western Mediterranean)
- Limonium californicum (California sea-lavender; western North America, Oregon to Baja California)
- Limonium callianthum (western China: Xinjiang)

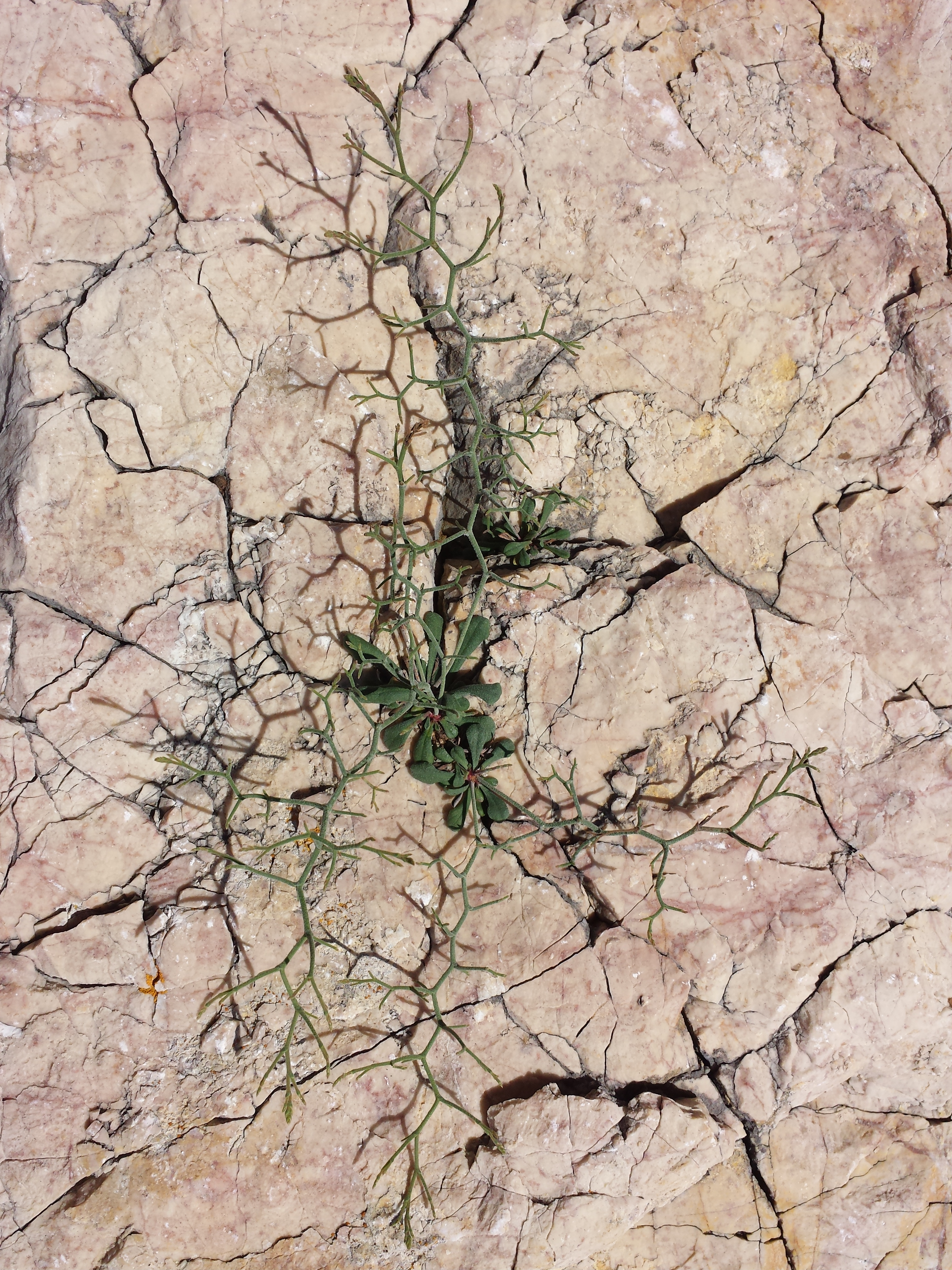
L. cancellatum

- Limonium cancelatum (eastern Mediterranean Croatia)
- Limonium carolinianum (Carolina sea-lavender; eastern North America, Newfoundland to Bermuda, Florida and Tamaulipas; syn. L. angustatum, L. nashii)
- Limonium caspium (central Europe east to central Asia)
- Limonium chrysocomum (central Asia)
- Limonium confusum (western Mediterranean)
- Limonium congestum (central Asia)
- Limonium coralloides (central Asia)
- Limonium cordatum (central Mediterranean)
- Limonium cosyrense (eastern Mediterranean)
- Limonium delicatulum (western Mediterranean)
- Limonium dichroanthum (central Asia)
- Limonium dielsianum (western China: Gansu, Qinghai)
- Limonium dregeanum (Natal statice; South Africa)
- Limonium echioides (Mediterranean)
- Limonium emarginatum (southern Iberia, northern Morocco)
- Limonium ferulaceum (western Mediterranean)
- Limonium flexuosum (central Asia)
- Limonium franchetii (east coastal China)
- Limonium fruticans (Tenerife, endemic)
- Limonium gmelinii (eastern Europe, northern Asia, Siberia)
- Limonium gougetianum (western Mediterranean)
- Limonium humile (lax-flowered sea-lavender; northwest Europe)
- Limonium imbricatum (Tenerife, endemic)
- Limonium insigne (southeast Spain, endemic)
- Limonium jovibarba (Cape Verde)
- Limonium kaschgaricum (central Asia)
- Limonium iranicum (Iran)
- Limonium lacostei (western China, Tibet, Kashmir)
- Limonium leptolobum (central Asia)
- Limonium leptostachyum (statice; central Asia)
- Limonium lilacinum (central Turkey, endemic)
- Limonium limbatum (Transpecos sea-lavender; interior southwest United States)
- Limonium lobinii (Cape Verde)
- Limonium macrophyllum (Tenerife)

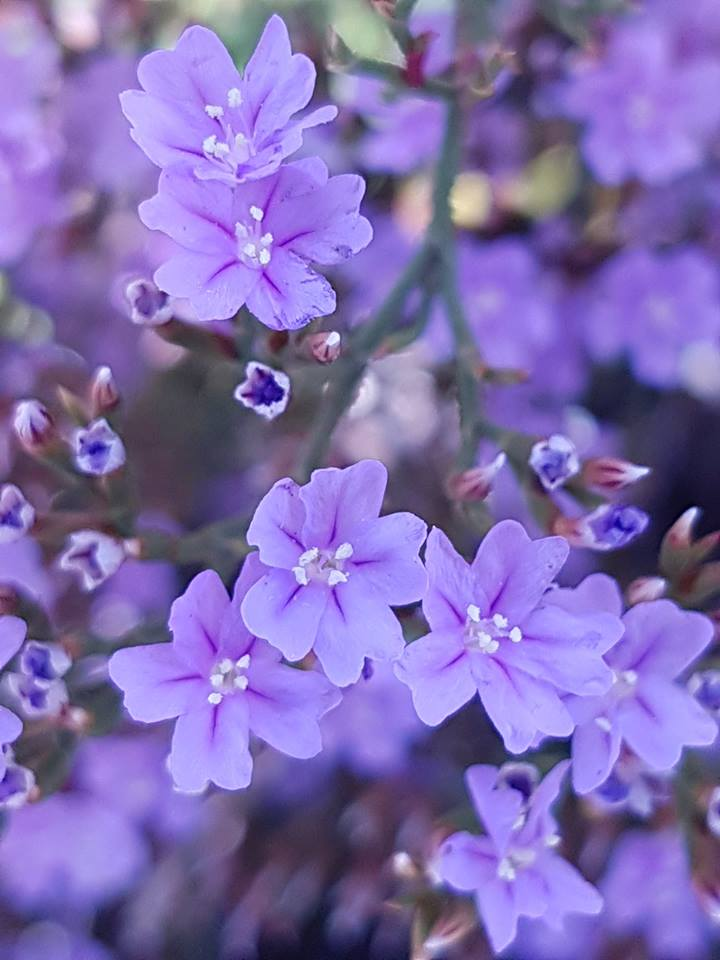
Limonium scabrum

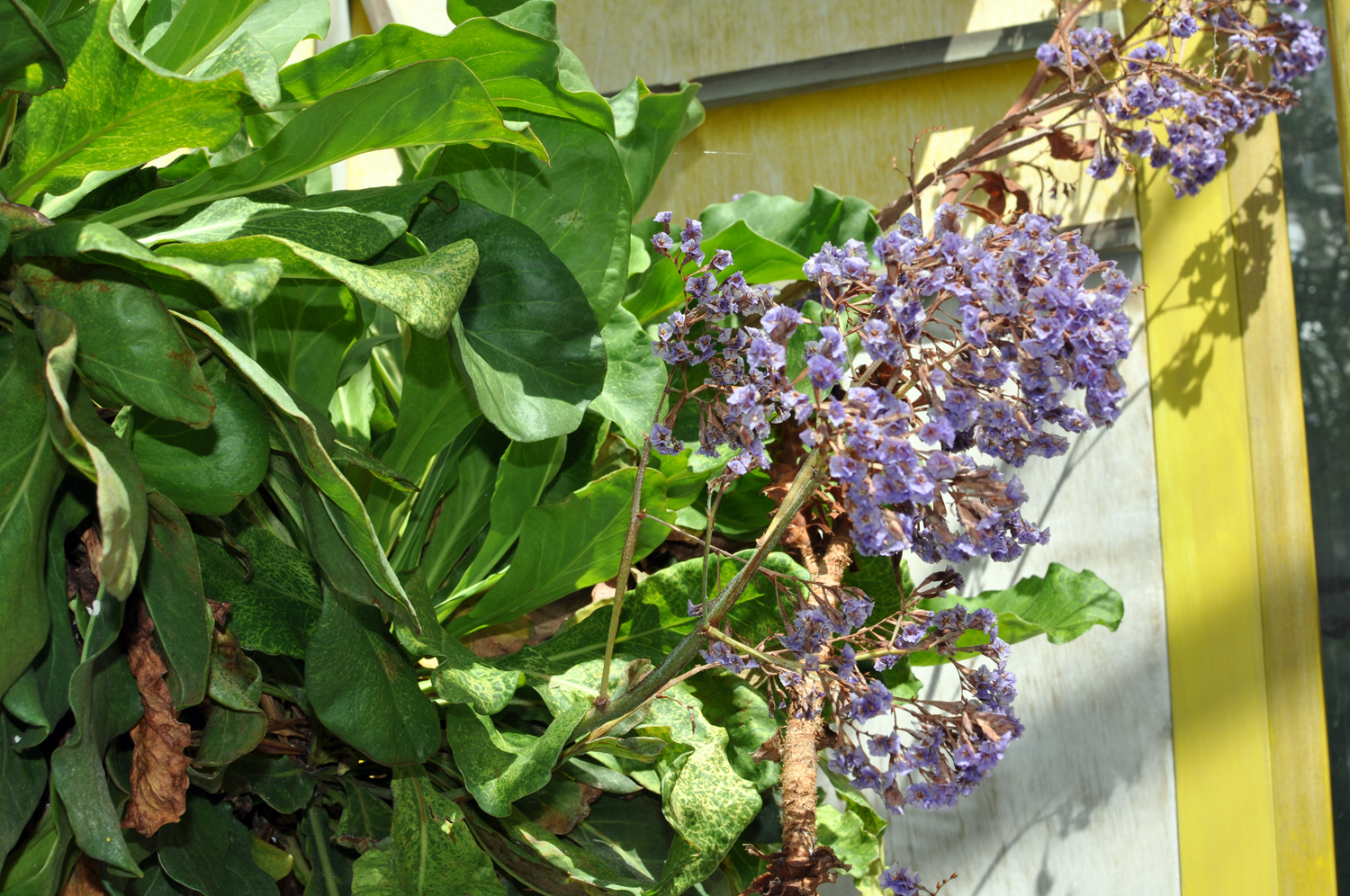
Limonium macrophyllum

- Limonium macropterum (Canary Islands)
- Limonium macrorhabdos (Ladakh)
- Limonium melitensis (Malta)
- Limonium minutum (Balearic Islands, endemic)
- Limonium mouretii (Morocco)
- Limonium multiflorum (western Portugal, endemic)
- Limonium myrianthum (central Asia)
- Limonium narbonense (Southern Europe, North Africa, Southwest Asia)
- Limonium nashii (Maritime North America)
- Limonium ornatum (Morocco)
- Limonium otolepis (Saltmarsh sea-lavender; southwest and central Asia)
- Limonium paradoxum (Great Britain, Ireland, endemic)
- Limonium paulayanum (Yemen, endemic)
- Limonium pectinatum (Canary Islands)
- Limonium peregrinum (South Africa)
- Limonium perezii (Perez's sea-lavender; Canary Islands)
- Limonium platyphyllum (German statice; central and southeast Europe)
- Limonium potaninii (western China: Sichuan, Qinghai, Gansu)
- Limonium preauxii (Canary Islands)
- Limonium puberulum (Canary Islands)
- Limonium ramosissimum (Mediterranean)
- Limonium reniforme (kidneyleaf sea-lavender; Iran)
- Limonium rezniczenkoanum (central Asia)
- Limonium sibthorpianum (Mediterranean: Sicily in Italy)
- Limonium scabrum Kuntze (South Africa)
- Limonium sieberi (eastern Mediterranean)
- Limonium sinense (eastern Asia coasts: China, Ryukyu Islands, Vietnam)
- Limonium sinuatum (wavyleaf sea-lavender; Mediterranean)
- Limonium sokotranum (Yemen, endemic)
- Limonium solanderi (Australia)
- Limonium spathulatum (Mediterranean)
- Limonium spectabile (Canary islands)
- Limonium strictissimum (Mediterranean: France, Italy)
- Limonium suffruticosum (western and central Asia)
- Limonium tenellum (Mongolia, northwest China)
- Limonium tetragonum (square-stalked sea lavender; eastern Asia south to New Caledonia)
- Limonium thouinii (Mediterranean)
- Limonium tomentellum (Black Sea region)
- Limonium virgatum (western Mediterranean)
- Limonium vulgare (common sea-lavender; western Europe, northwest Africa)
- Limonium wrightii (Japan, Taiwan)
- Limonium zeraphae (Malta)
- Limonium calabrum (Italy)

Some species formerly included in Limonium, e.g. L. tataricum, have now been transferred to the separate genus Goniolimon.
