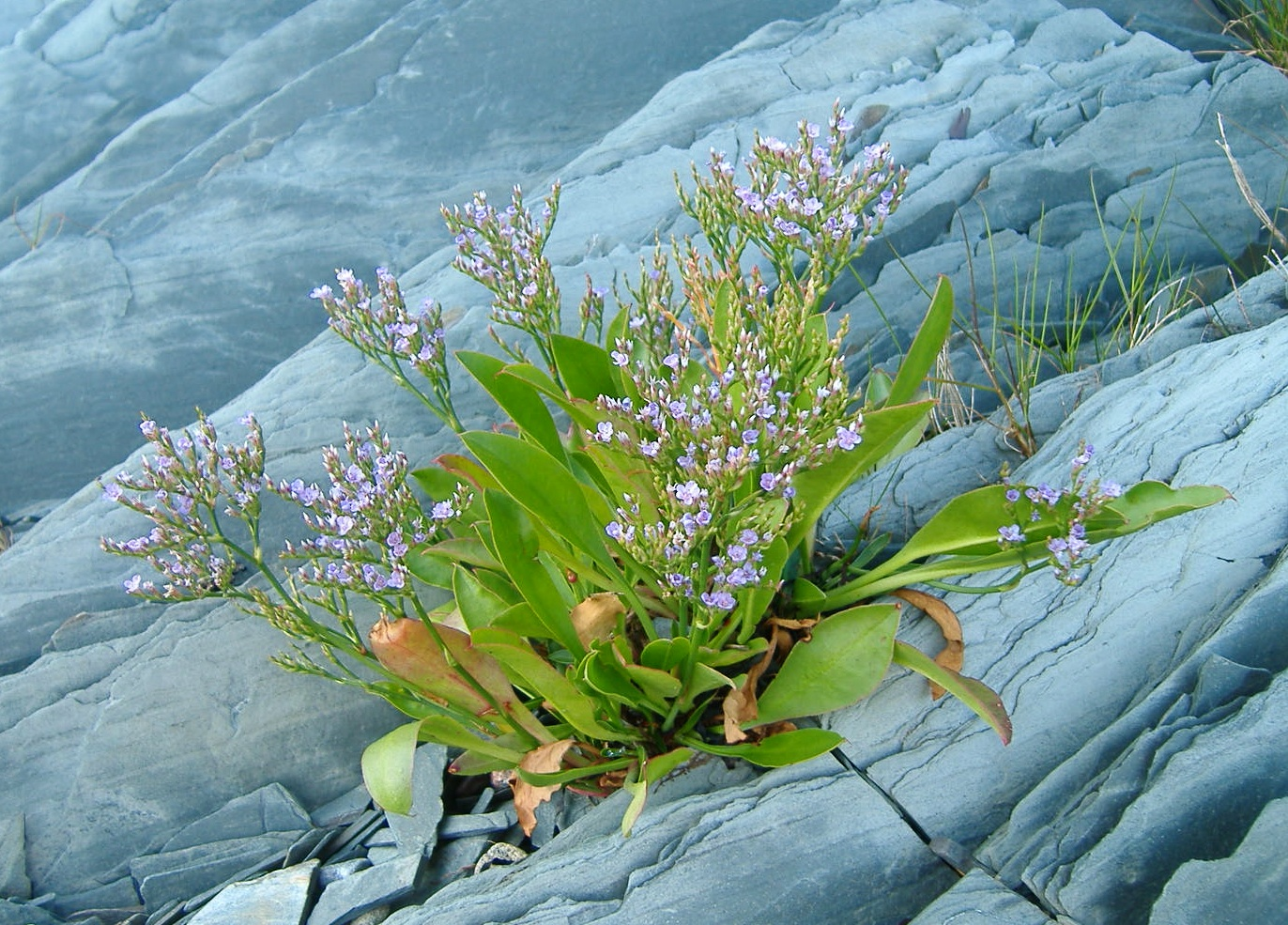

Scientific classification
- Kingdom: Plantae
- Clade: Embryophytes
- Clade: Tracheophytes
- Clade: Angiosperms
- Clade: Eudicots
- Order: Caryophyllales
- Family: Plumbaginaceae
- Genus: Limonium
- Species: L. carolinianum

Binomial name
- Limonium carolinianum (Walter) Britton

Synonyms
- List: Limonium angustatum (A.Gray) Small; Limonium carolinianum var. angustatum (A.Gray) S.F.Blake; Limonium carolinianum var. compactum Shinners; Limonium carolinianum var. nashii (Small) B.Boivin; Limonium carolinianum var. obtusilobum (S.F.Blake) H.E.Ahles; Limonium carolinianum var. trichogonum (S.F.Blake) B.Boivin; Limonium endlichianum (Wangerin)S.F.Blake; Limonium lefroyi (Hemsl.) Britton; Limonium nashii Small; Limonium nashii f. albiflorum House; Limonium nashii var. angustatum (A.Gray) H.E.Ahles; Limonium nashii var. trichogonum S.F.Blake; Limonium obtusilobum S.F.Blake; Limonium trichogonum S.F.Blake; Statice angustata (A.Gray) Wangerin; Statice brasiliensis var. angustata A.Gray; Statice caroliniana Walter; Statice endlichiana Wangerin; Statice lefroyi Hemsl.; Statice limonium var. carolinianum (Walter) A.Gray; Statice nashii (Small) Wangerin; Statice tracyi Gand.; Taxanthema carolinianum Sweet

= Limonium carolinianum =

Species of flowering plant

Limonium carolinianum, known variously as Carolina sealavender, canker root, ink root, marsh root, lavender thrift, American thrift, or seaside thrift, is a species of flowering plant native to the eastern shores of North America, from northern Mexico to Canada. It is a slow-growing perennial herb found in salt marshes and other maritime habitats. Its inflorescences are frequently harvested for use in cut flower arrangements.
