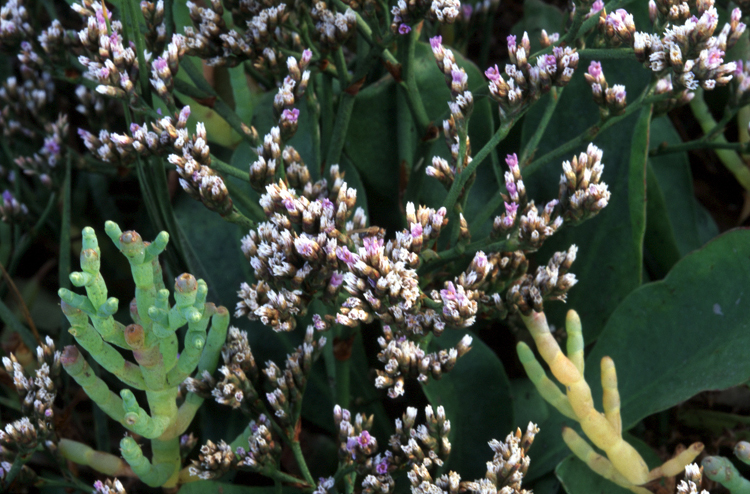

Scientific classification
- Kingdom: Plantae
- Clade: Embryophytes
- Clade: Tracheophytes
- Clade: Angiosperms
- Clade: Eudicots
- Order: Caryophyllales
- Family: Plumbaginaceae
- Genus: Limonium
- Species: L. californicum

Binomial name
- Limonium californicum (Boiss.) A.Heller

Synonyms
- Limonium californicum var. mexicanum (S.F.Blake) Munz; Limonium commune var. californicum (Boiss.) Greene; Limonium commune var. mexicanum (S.F.Blake) Jeps. Limonium mexicanum S.F.Blake; Statice limonium var. californica (Boiss.) A.Gray

= Limonium californicum =

Species of flowering plant

Limonium californicum is a species of sea lavender in the family Plumbaginaceae. It is known by the common names western marsh rosemary and California sea lavender.

== Description ==
This is a tough perennial herb growing from a woody rhizome. The thick, leathery leaves are oval in shape and up to about 30 centimeters (12 in) long including the petioles, located in a basal rosette about the stem. The inflorescence is a stiff, branching panicle no more than about 35 centimeters (14 in) tall bearing large clusters of flowers. The flowers have brownish white ribbed sepals and lavender to nearly white petals.

== Range ==
L. californicum is native to western North America from Oregon to Baja California, with occasional sightings in Nevada and Arizona.

== Habitat ==
L. californicum is found on coastal beaches, salt marshes, and coastal prairie, and other sandy saline and alkaline habitat such as playas.
