= Antoon Sanders =

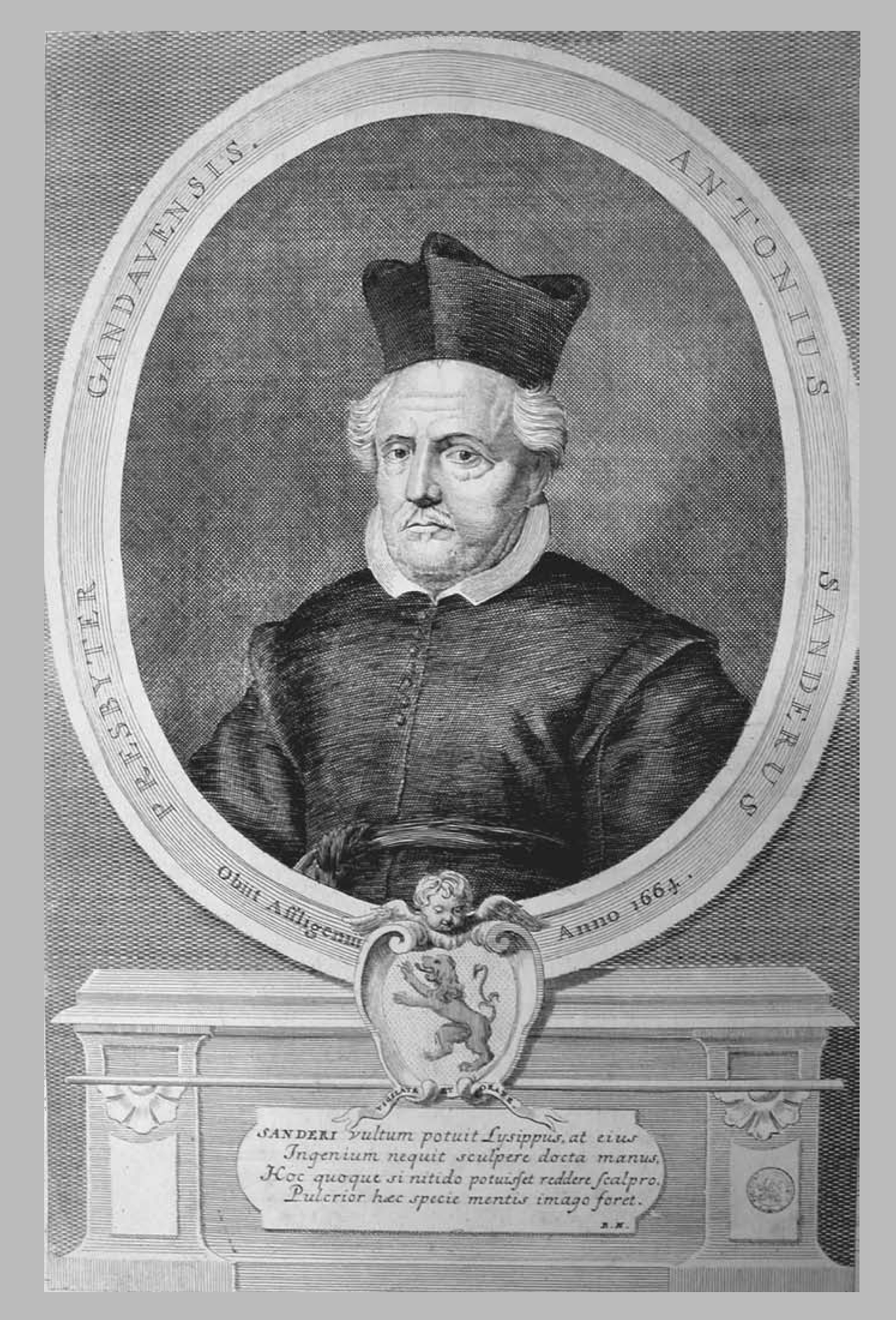
Antoon Sanders

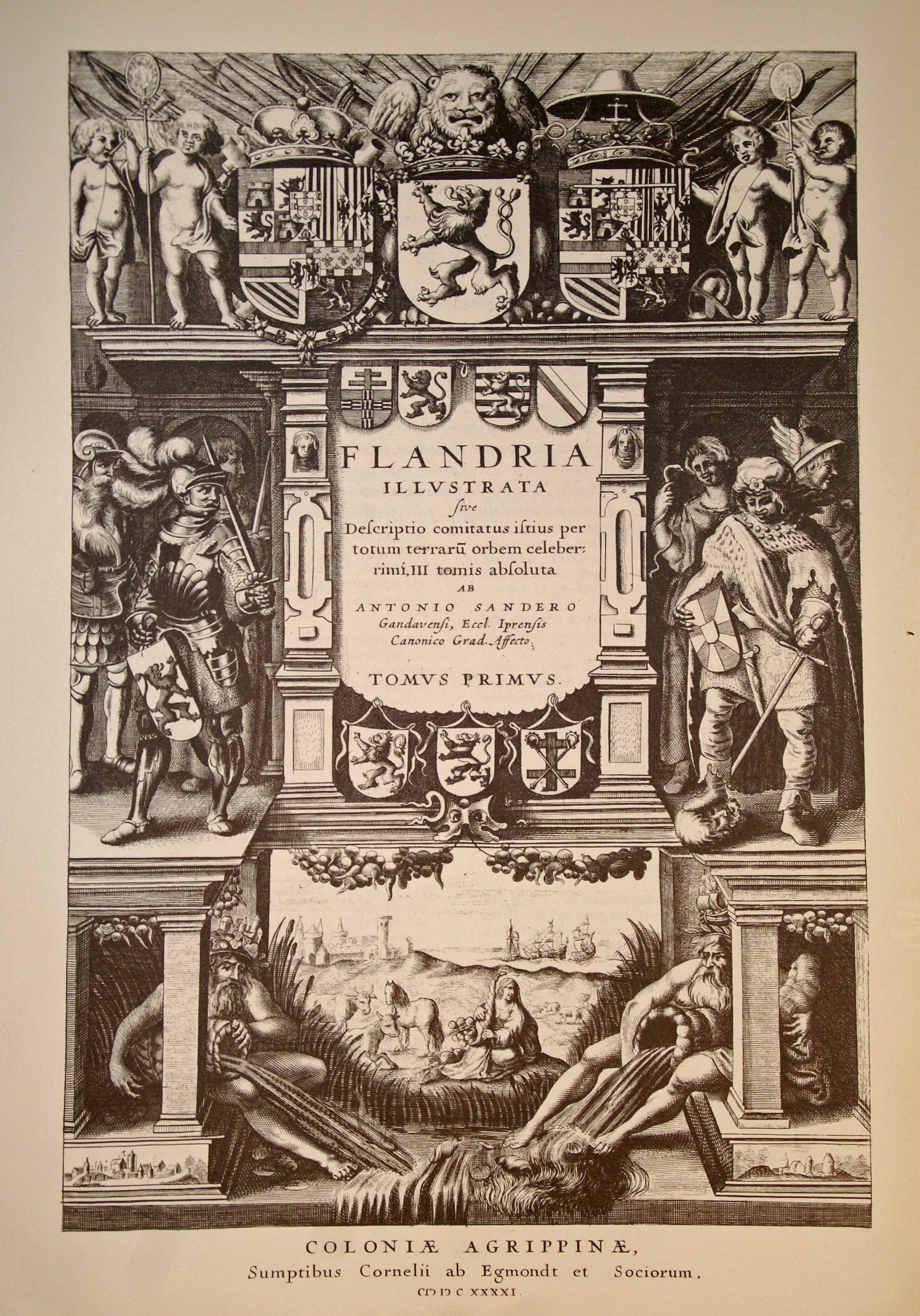
Front page of the first edition (1641) of the Flandria Illustrata

Antonius Sanderus (Antwerp, 15 September 1586 – Affligem, 10 January 1664) was a Catholic cleric and historian from the Duchy of Brabant in the Habsburg Netherlands (now Belgium).

== Biography ==
Sanderus was christened "Antoon Sanders", but like all writers and scholars of his time he Latinized his name. Having become master of philosophy at the University of Douai in 1609, he studied theology for some years under Johannes Malderus (Jan van Malderen) at the University of Leuven, and Willem Hessels van Est (Estius) at Douai, and was ordained priest at Ghent.

For some years he was engaged in parochial duties, and combated the Anabaptist movement in Flanders with great zeal and success. In 1625, he became secretary and almoner of Cardinal Alfonso de la Cueva, later becoming canon and scholaster of St Martin's Cathedral, Ypres. Publication of the first volume of his sumptuously illustrated Flandria illustrata (1641) nearly bankrupted him, and he was rescued by an award of 1,000 florins through the Lille Chamber of Accounts. Further subventions in support of his work followed in 1645, 1651, 1655 and 1662.

In 1654, he was appointed penitentiary at Ypres. After three years, however, he resigned this office to devote himself entirely to scholarly pursuits, and especially to historical studies. He soon found himself compelled to claim the hospitality of the Benedictine Abbey of Affligem, since he had reduced himself to absolute poverty by the publication of numerous works.

== Writings ==
He combined high intellectual gifts with great zeal, and left behind forty-two printed, and almost as many unprinted, works. The most important was:

- Chorographia sacra Brabantiae sive celebrium in ea provincia ecclesiarum et coenobiorum descriptio, imaginibus aeneis illustrata (Brussels, 1659; The Hague, 1726)

Also important were:

- De scriptoribus Flandriae libri III (Antwerp, 1624)
- De Gandavensibus eruditionis fama claris (Antwerp 1624)
- De Brugensibus eruditionis fama claris libri II (Antwerp, 1624)
- Hagiologium Flandriae sive de sanctis eius provinciae liber unus (Antwerp, 1625; 2nd ed., Lille, 1639).

A collected edition of these four works appeared under the title: Flandria illustrata (2 volumes, Cologne, 1641–44; The Hague, 1726).

Of his other works may be mentioned:

- Lacrymae in funere Alberti Austriaci optimi et clementiss. Belgarum principis (Plantin Press, 1621)
- Elogia cardinalium sanctitate, doctrina et armis illustrium (Louvain, 1625)
- Gandavium sive rerum Gandavensium libri VI (Brussels, 1627)
- Bibliotheca belgica manuscripta (2 parts, Lille, 1641–3)
