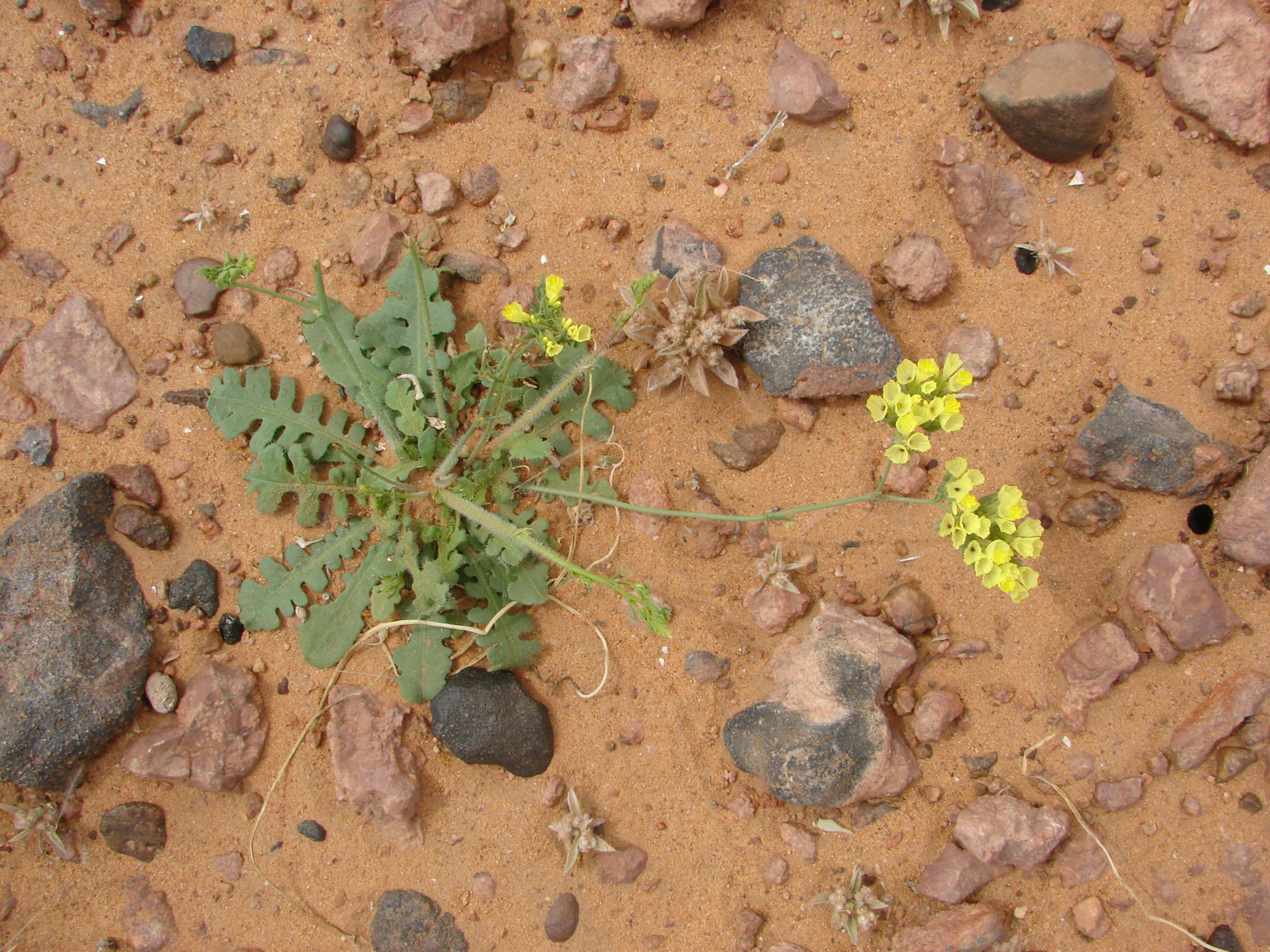
- In bloom in Morocco
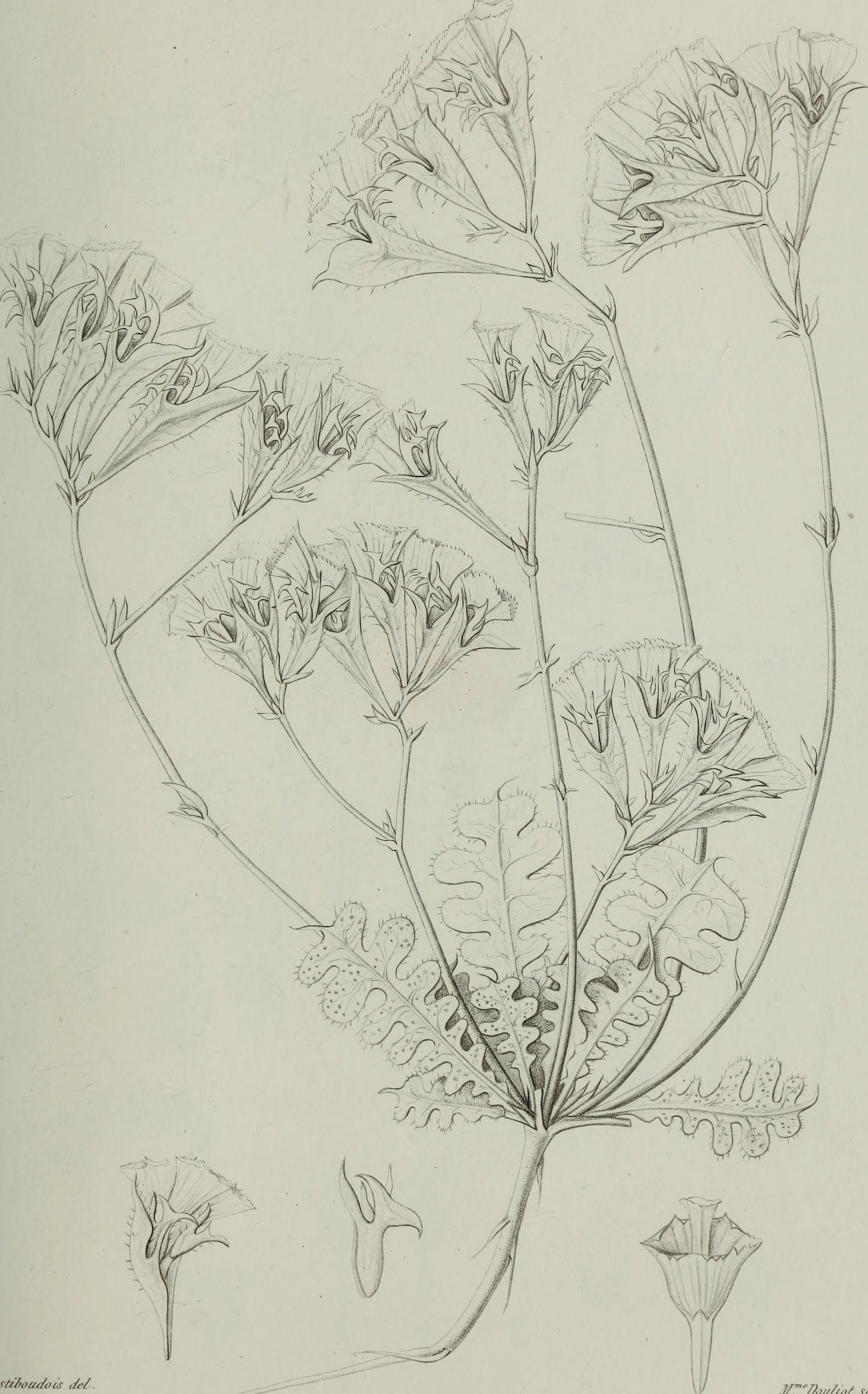
- Botanical illustration

Scientific classification
- Kingdom: Plantae
- Clade: Embryophytes
- Clade: Tracheophytes
- Clade: Angiosperms
- Clade: Eudicots
- Order: Caryophyllales
- Family: Plumbaginaceae
- Genus: Limonium
- Species: L. bonduellei

Binomial name
- Limonium bonduellei (T.Lestib.) Kuntze

Synonyms
- Limonium sinuatum subsp. bonduellei (T.Lestib.) Sauvage & Vindt; Statice bonduellei T.Lestib.; Statice bonduelli T.Lestib.

= Limonium bonduellei =

Species of plant

Limonium bonduellei, the yellow statice (a name it shares with Limonium sinuatum), is a species of flowering plant in the family Plumbaginaceae. The Global Biodiversity Information Facility calls it Algerian statice and lists it as Limonium sinuatum subsp. bonduellei, but a 2018 molecular study showed that it is good species with 100% bootstrap support. An annual facultative halophyte reaching 50 cm (20 in), it is native to Spain and North Africa, and has been introduced to Italy. It is naturalized in New Zealand.

The British florists' association Interflora claims that its cultivar 'Forever Gold' is one of the most popular and widely available taxa of Limonium in the trade and in gardens, along with Limonium platyphyllum. The Royal Horticultural Society lists 'Forever Gold' as a cultivar of Limonium sinuatum.
