= University of Douai =

Former university in France (1559–1887)

- Université de Douai
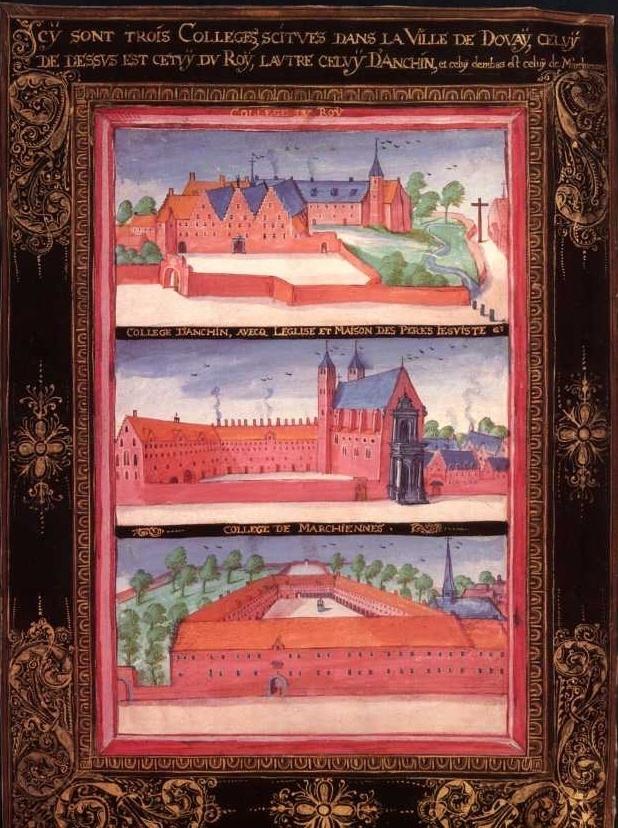
- Latin: Universitas Duacensis
- Active: 1559–1886 (transformed as University of Lille)
- Location: Douai, France; 50.38°N 3.08°E

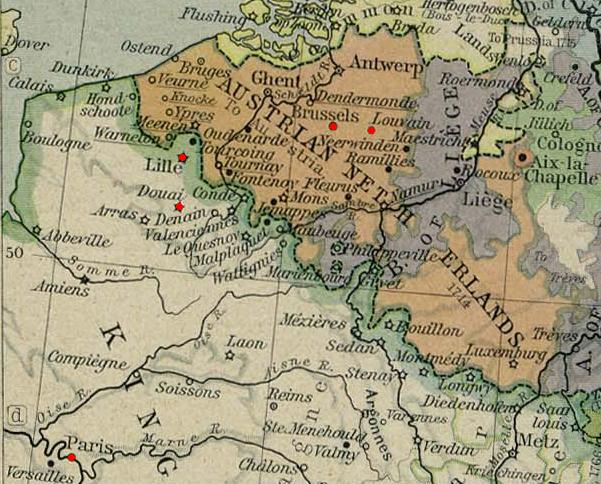
Map (1786): Location of the university of Douai, with regards to the cities of Paris, Lille, Brussels and Leuven

The University of Douai (French: Université de Douai; Dutch: Universiteit van Dowaai) was a historic university in Douai, France. With a medieval tradition of scholarly activity in the city, the university was established in 1559, and lectures began in 1562. It ceased operations from 1795 to 1808. In 1887, it was relocated 27 km away to Lille, where it became the University of Lille.

From the mid-16th century onward, the University of Douai had a Europe-wide influence as a prominent center of Neo-Latin literature, contributing to the dissemination of printed knowledge. With 1,500 to 2,000 registered students and several hundred professors, it was the second-largest university in France during the late 17th and 18th centuries. Studies in mathematics and physics at the Douai Faculty of Arts produced advancements in artillery practice.

== History ==
=== Douai, scholar pole from the late Middle Ages to the Renaissance ===
Before the formal establishment of the university, Douai had a rich scholarly tradition dating back to the late Middle Ages. Nearby, Anchin Abbey served as a significant cultural center from the 11th to the 13th century, producing numerous manuscripts and charters. It was rivaled by the scriptoria of Marchiennes Abbey and Flines Abbey. Alongside these abbeys, other monastic houses in Douai contributed to the city's intellectual activity. By the 16th century, these institutions ensured that "close to the city, several very rich abbeys could provide space and resources to the new university."

The bonds of vassalage tying the County of Flanders to the Kingdom of France were abolished in 1526, with Flanders becoming an imperial province under the Treaty of Madrid (1526), signed by King Francis I of France and Charles V, Holy Roman Emperor. This arrangement was later confirmed by the Treaty of Cambrai (1529). Consequently, it was to the emperor that the magistrates of Douai submitted a request in 1531 to establish a university in the town. However, formal approval for the university was only granted during the reign of Philip II of Spain.

=== Old university of Douai (1559–1795) ===
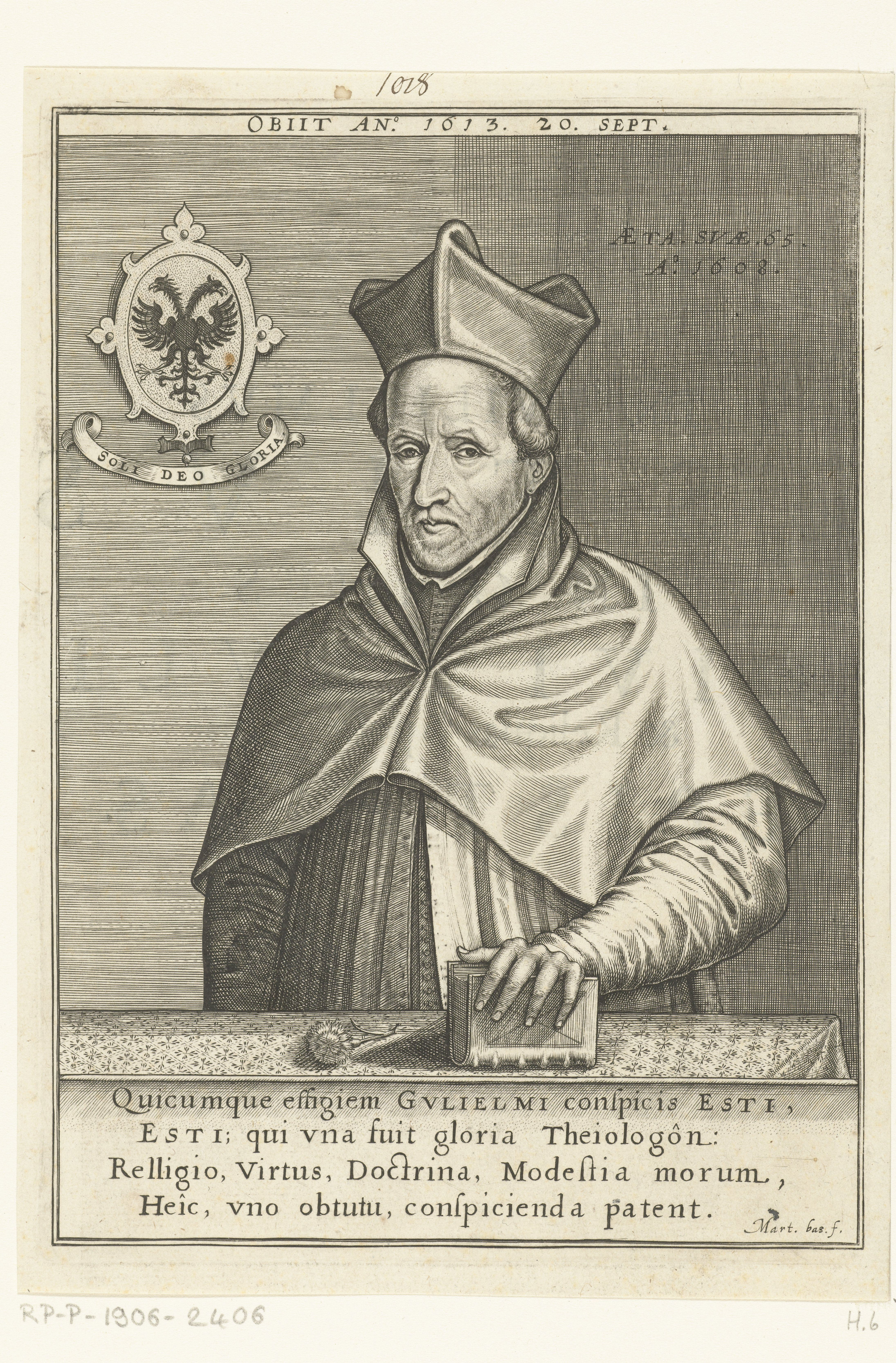
Willem Hessels van Est (1542–1613)

William Allen (cardinal) (1532–1594)

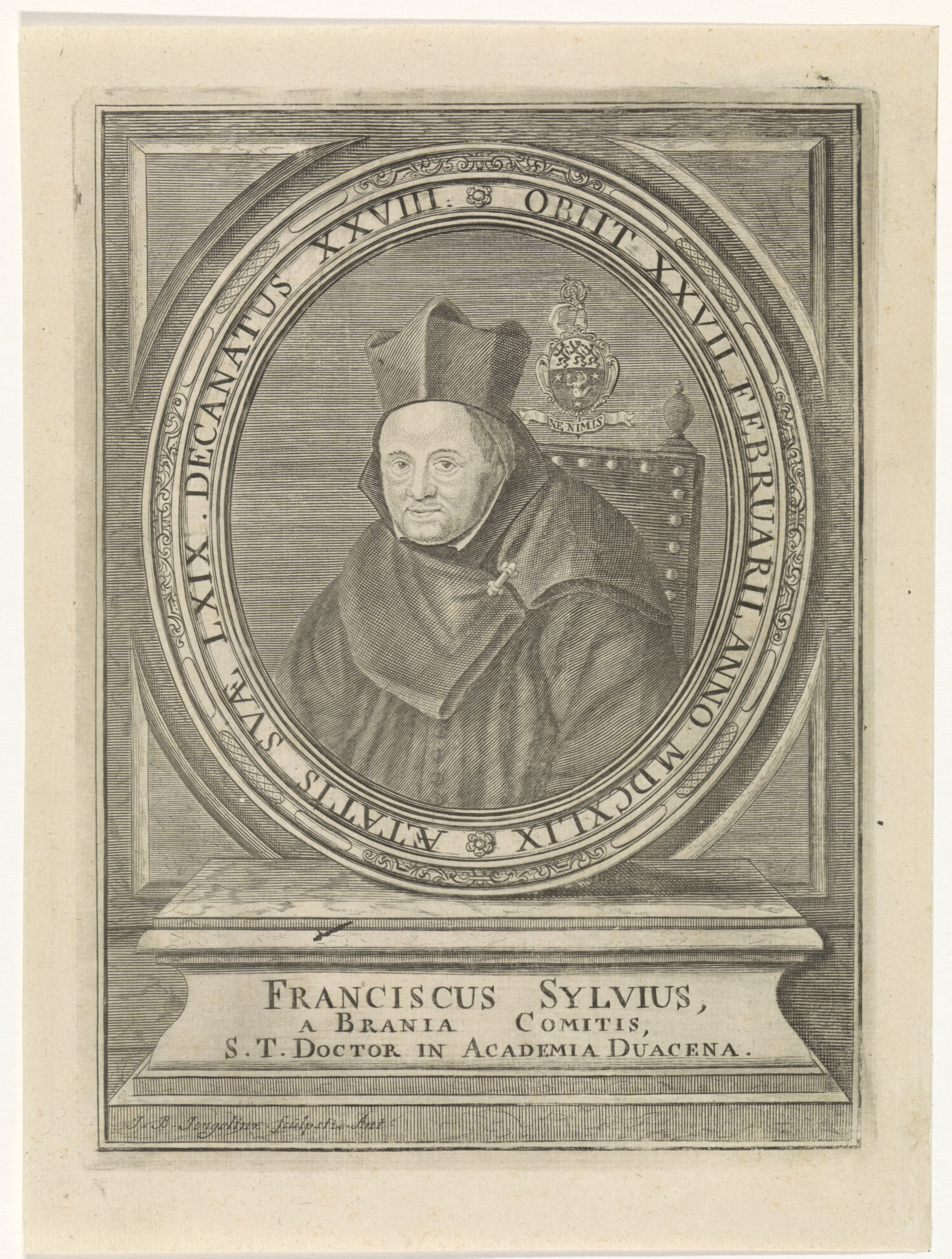
Francis Sylvius (1581–1649)

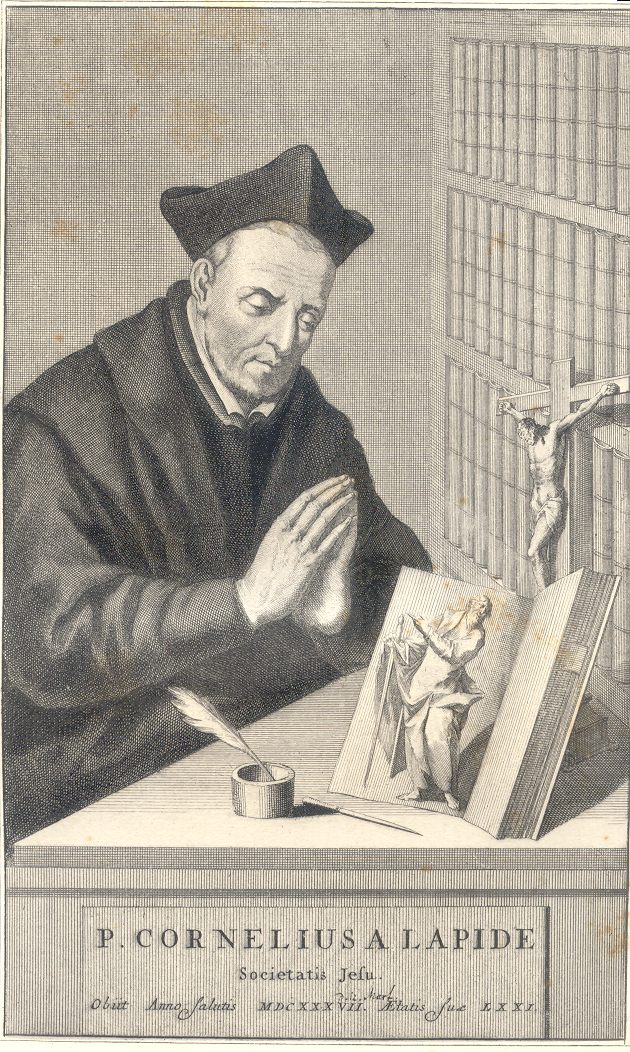
Cornelius a Lapide (1567–1637)

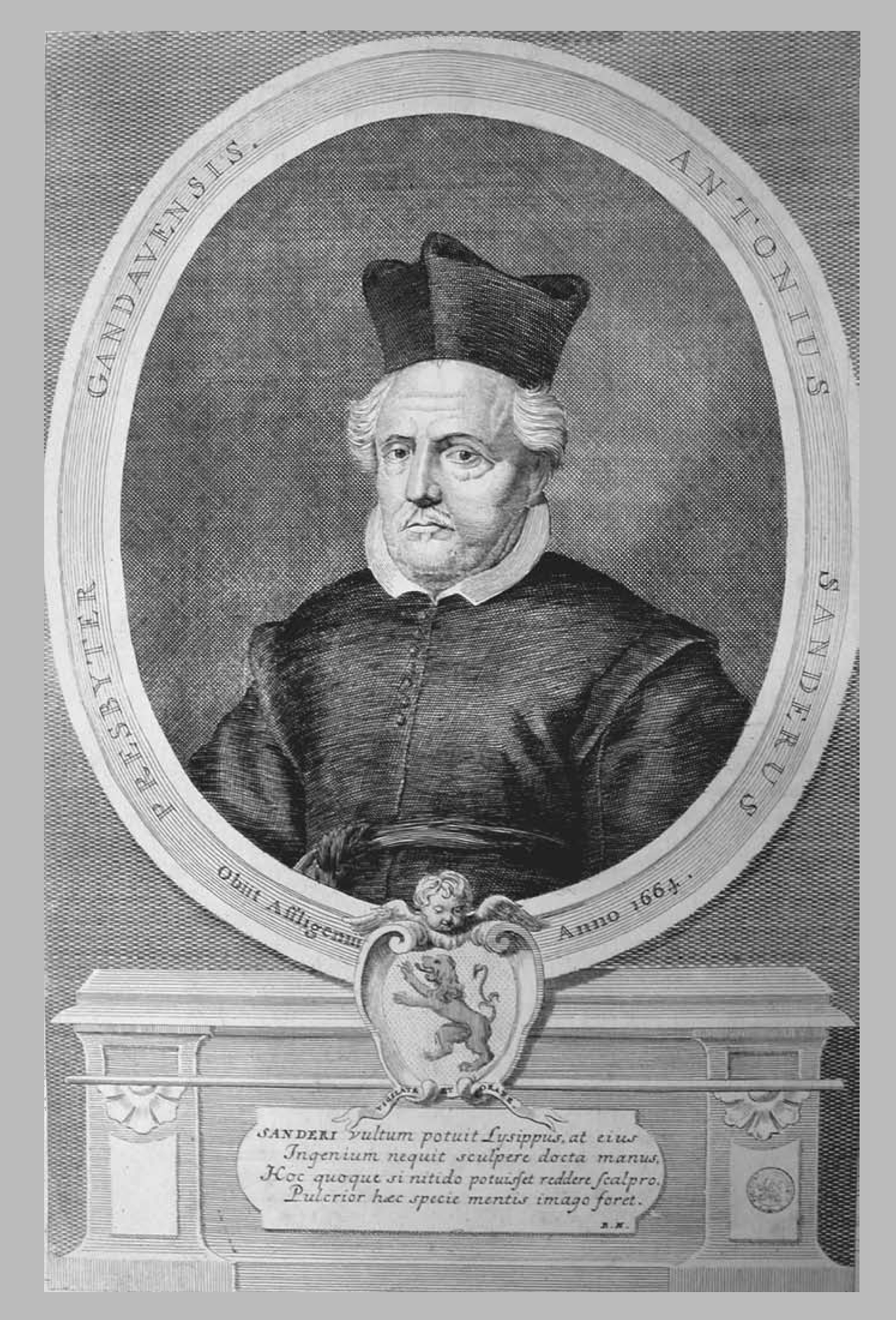
Anton Sander (1586–1664)

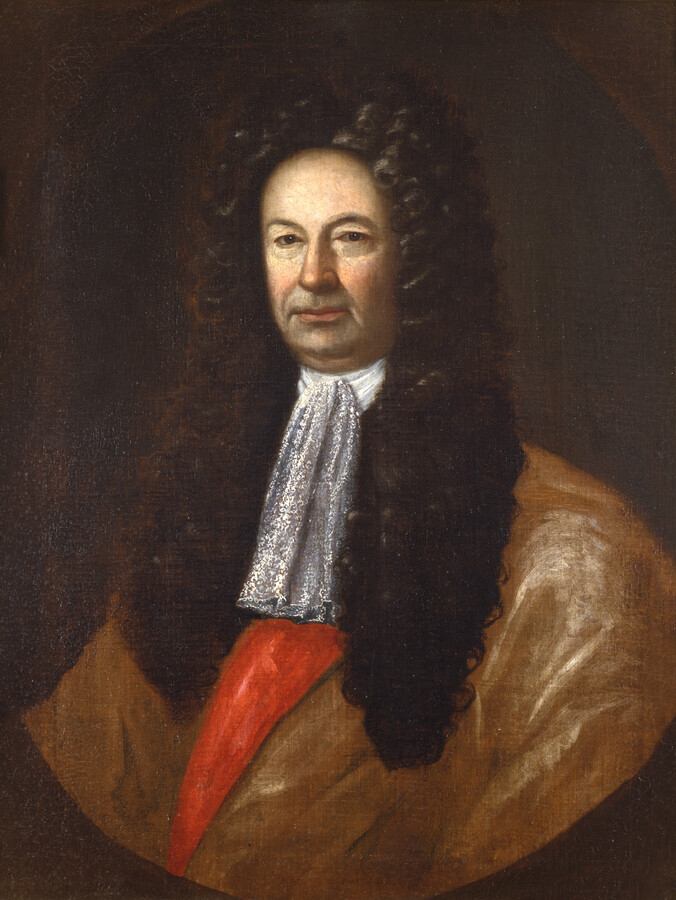
Charles Carroll the Settler (1661–1720)

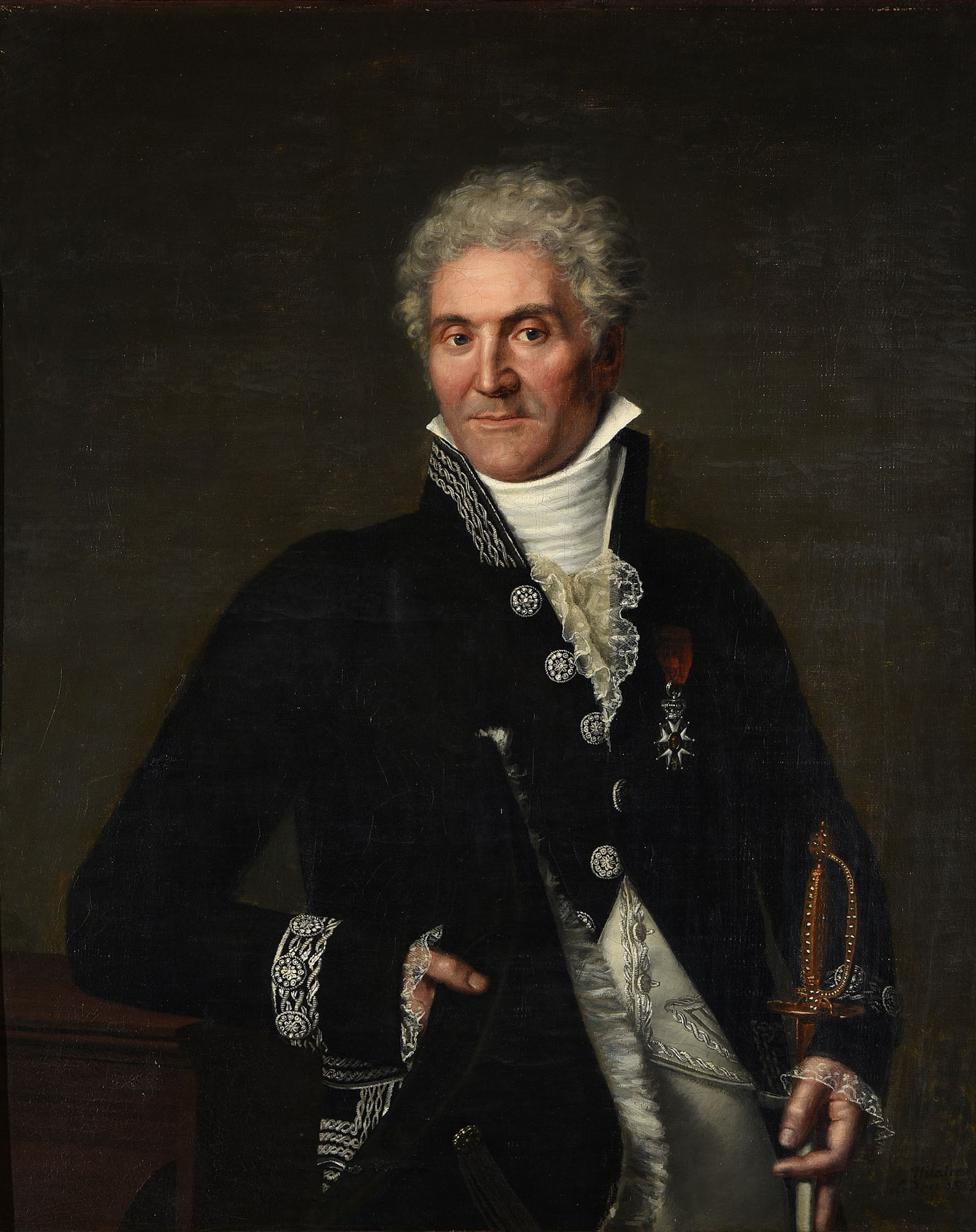
Philippe-Antoine Merlin de Douai (1754–1838)

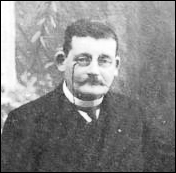
Georges Palante (1862–1925)

==== Establishment of the university (1559) ====
As part of a larger program to consolidate the Spanish Low Countries, a university was established in Douai by Philip II between 1559 and 1562. The university was a counterpart to Leuven University, founded in 1426. The foundation was confirmed by a papal bull issued by Pope Paul IV on 31 July 1559 and reaffirmed by Pope Pius IV on 6 January 1560. Philip II's letters patent, dated 19 January 1561, authorized the creation of five faculties: Theology, Canon Law, Civil Law, Medicine, and Arts.

The university's formal inauguration took place on 5 October 1562, marked by a public procession of the Blessed Sacrament and a sermon delivered in the marketplace by François Richardot, the Bishop of Arras. The institution's first chancellor was Richard Smith, an Englishman.

==== College du Roi (1562), College d'Anchin (1568) and College de Marchiennes (1570) ====
The first university college established in Douai was the "Collège du Roi" (King's College), which opened in 1562. A second college was founded in 1564 but was later replaced by the Collège d'Anchin in 1568. Another college, supported by the Abbey of Marchiennes, opened in 1570. These colleges served not only as accommodation for students but also as venues for lectures.

Royal-appointed lecturers accounted for only a tenth of the 300 teachers in the faculty. The faculty of the Jesuit College, which included up to 145 teachers, was regarded as the most influential center of power within the university.

==== English College in Douai (1562–1793) ====
Although the University of Douai was founded on the model of Louvain, from which it drew most of its initial professors, it was also influenced by the English during its early years. Several key positions were held by Englishmen, many of whom were former scholars from Oxford.

The university's first chancellor was Richard Smyth, a former Fellow of Merton College, Oxford, and Regius Professor of Divinity at Oxford. Owen Lewis, a former Fellow of New College, Oxford, who had also held the corresponding position at Oxford, served for many years as the Regius Professor of Canon Law at Douai.

The first principal of Marchiennes College was Richard White (also known as Richard Gwyn), another former Fellow of New College. Additionally, William Allen, after earning his licentiate at Douai in 1560, became the university's Regius Professor of Divinity.

The founding of the University of Douai coincided with the presence of a significant number of English Catholics who had settled in Douai following the accession of Elizabeth I and the reimposition of Protestantism in England. This community, along with the role of the university, inspired William Allen to establish a seminary in Douai in 1569 for English Catholic priests.

The seminary’s studies were partially linked to the university, and priests were trained there to return to England. It was at this English College in Douai that the English translation of the Bible, known as the Douay–Rheims Version, was completed in 1609. However, the first English Catholic Bible combining the Rheims New Testament and the Douay Old Testament into a single volume was not printed until 1764.

==== Scottish College in Douai (1573–1802) ====
The Scottish College was established in 1573 by Bishop John Lesley, who opposed the Scottish Reformation and the destabilization of the Auld Alliance between France and Scotland by Protestant England. It was later refounded in 1608. After Douai's conquest by the French, Scots residing there automatically held dual French and Scottish citizenship under the Auld Alliance.

The college in Douai hosted scholars from the Scottish Stuart supporter movement and exiles from the Jacobite risings, particularly between 1688 and 1692. Historical collections were deposited at the college by King James II of England and VII of Scotland—the last Catholic monarch of Great Britain—as well as by other exiled Scottish Catholics.

==== Irish College in Douai (1603–1905) ====
St. Patrick's Irish College of Douai was founded in 1603 by Christopher Cusack, with the support of Philip III of Spain, an ally of the Irish Catholics in their resistance to the colonization of Ireland by English power. Hugh Ó Neill, 2nd Earl of Tyrone and leader of the Irish resistance during the Nine Years' War, stayed at Douai University on his way into exile from Ireland to Rome in 1607. The Irish College was officially attached to the Faculty of Theology at the University of Douai in 1610.

==== Bronchorst scholarship foundation (1629) ====
By his will dated 20 June 1629, Henry Bronchorst established a scholarship for a period of nine years to support members of the Seven Noble Houses of Brussels in studying at the University of Douai. This explains the significant number of members of the Brussels magistracy who were educated at this university.

==== Other foundations ====
The town was a center of Catholic life, and connected with the university were not only the English College, but also the Irish and Scottish colleges (i.e., seminaries), as well as Benedictine, Jesuit, and Franciscan houses. For a time, there was also a Charterhouse. The Collège d'Anchin opened a few months after the English College, endowed by the Abbot of the nearby monastery of Anchin, and entrusted to the Jesuits. In 1570, the Abbot of Marchiennes founded a college for the study of law. The Abbot of Saint-Vast also founded a college bearing his name. Later additions included the College of St. Thomas Aquinas, belonging to the Dominicans, the Collège du Roi, and others.

The Benedictines established a college in Douai, founded by Augustine Bradshaw in 1605, in rented apartments belonging to the Collège d'Anchin. A few years later, through the generosity of Philippe de Caverel, Abbot of the Monastery of Saint-Vaast, they obtained land and built a monastery, which opened in 1611. The house gained a high reputation for learning and was rebuilt between 1776 and 1781. Many professors of the university were at various times chosen from among its members.

The Anglo-Benedictines went into English exile during the French Revolution and were the only Douai institution to retain their ancient monastery afterward. When the community of St. Gregory was permanently established at Downside, they handed over their house in Douai to the community of St. Edmund, which had previously been located in Paris. These Benedictines continued to operate a school in Douai until 1903, when Waldeck-Rousseau's 1901 Law of Associations forced them to leave France. They returned to England and settled at Woolhampton, near Reading, where they founded Douai Abbey, known for its school, Douai School, which closed in 1999.

The Benedictine and Franciscan houses in Douai were located near each other and were both closely connected to the restoration of their respective orders in England. The Franciscan monastery was primarily founded through the efforts of Father John Gennings, the brother of the martyr Edmund Gennings. It was established in temporary quarters in 1618, with students attending the Jesuit schools during this time. By 1621, however, the Franciscans had built their own monastery and provided all necessary tuition within their own walls.

==== Heyday ====
In the 18th century, the University of Douai was the second largest in the Kingdom of France by student enrollment, with total registrations ranging between 1,500 and 2,000.

==== Closed university during the French Revolution (1795–1808) ====
The university was suppressed during the French Revolution, and its library holdings were transferred to the town's Bibliothèque Municipale (founded by Louis XV in 1767), which also received the collections of the Jesuits from the Collège d'Anchin. However, much of these collections were destroyed when the library was set on fire following a bombing on 11 August 1944, during the aftermath of the World War II Normandy landings.

=== Modern university of Douai (1808–1887) ===
The Faculties of Letters and Sciences in Douai were re-established in 1808. Douai regained a Faculty of Law in 1854, but in 1887, this faculty was transferred to Lille. Currently, the University of Lille and Artois University, which are part of the Community of Universities and Institutions Lille Nord de France, consider themselves successors to Philip II's University of Douai.

=== Transformation as University of Lille (1896) ===
In 1887, all faculties in Douai were relocated to the neighbouring city of Lille. The University of Lille was officially established in 1896, encompassing all faculties, including Sciences, Law, Medicine and Pharmacy, and Literature and Humanities.

== Faculties ==
=== Faculties of the old University of Douai ===
==== Faculty of Arts (1562–1795) ====
The Faculty of Arts in Douai was highly active and conferred Master of Arts degrees, which were a prerequisite for studying theology and law. Just as at the universities of Louvain and Paris, obtaining this MA degree from the Faculty of Arts was the first and mandatory step before pursuing studies in other faculties.

The University of Douai had an established reputation in philosophy and mathematics, particularly through (or in competition with) the Jesuit college. "The Faculty of Arts had three chairs (History, Hebrew, Greek) until 1704, when a chair in mathematics was created (...). A chair in hydrography has been in place since 1704."

Among the faculties, it was Mathematics in the sixteenth century, and the reshaping of the Mathematics chair by the Marquis de Pommereuil in 1705, that brought new prominence to optics, geometry, astronomy, architecture, the military use of alloy chemistry, and trigonometry, ensuring the training of skilled army officers. Mathematics and science in Douai were made illustrious in the early seventeenth century by the mathematician Charles Malapert, who discovered sunspots—probably before Kircher, whom he met in Ingolstadt. In the second half of the century, by Anthony Thomas, a Jesuit who succeeded Verbiest in China and chaired the tribunal of Mathematics in Beijing. This correspondent of the Academy of Sciences left behind a major work.

In 1679, the first school for artillery officers in France was established in Douai by King Louis XIV.

In the eighteenth century, the Douai faculty focused on mathematical logic in philosophy. This focus led to the growth of knowledge in areas such as physics—mechanics, mathematics, optics, perspective, astronomy, cosmography, and elements of natural history (chemistry, history, geography, philology). This emphasis on mathematics assisted in the training of military and naval officers. Douai also had a large library, a museum of ethnology and archaeology, and a museum of natural sciences. Despite the Church's distrust of the sciences, Douai closely followed scientific developments, which stimulated further discoveries.

It was not until 1750 that the French language supplanted Latin, though this process was not completed until the French Revolution.

By the French law of 8 Prairial IV (1795), the École centrale de Lille was established in the neighbouring city of Lille, not in Douai, as the successor to the Douai Faculty of Arts. Douai itself regained a science faculty only in 1808.

==== Faculty of Theology (1562–1793) ====
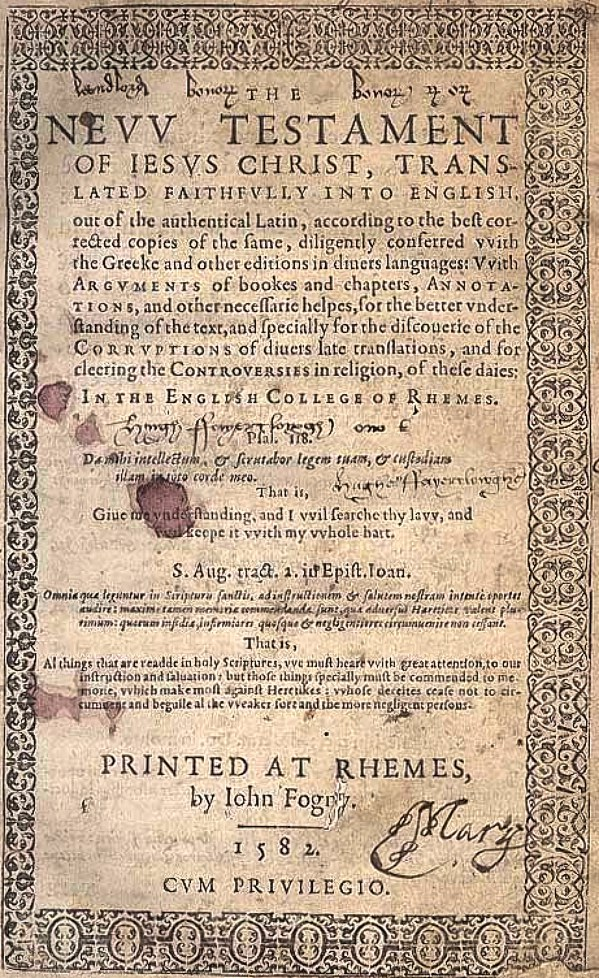
Douay–Rheims Bible (1582–1609)

It was within this faculty that the Douay–Rheims Bible was produced.

The Faculty of Theology offered three two-year courses, leading to the successive degrees of Bachelor, Licentiate, and Doctor.

One prominent professor was Willem Hessels van Est, a commentator on the Pauline epistles. He studied classics at Utrecht and later spent around twenty years at Louvain, focusing on philosophy, theology, and Holy Scripture. In 1580, he earned the degree of Doctor of Theology. In 1582, he became a Professor of Theology at Douai, a position he held for thirty-one years. For the last eighteen years of his life, he was Chancellor of the University, and was also the rector of the diocesan seminary for many years. Estius's works, written in Latin, were mostly published posthumously.

Other notable faculty members included Leonardus Lessius (1554–1623), a professor of philosophy; François du Bois; Franciscus Sylvius (1581–1649), a professor of theology and vice-chancellor of the University; Nemius Gaspard Dubois; George Colveneere; and Philippe Bossuet Cospéan, who was actively involved in the Douai controversy.

Major doctrinal debates took place within the Faculty of Theology, beginning with opposition to Gallicanism and the Déclaration des Quatre Articles, which was originally contested at Douai in 1683, and later involving conflicts between Jesuits and Jansenists. After the initial European acclaim brought by Estius, "the Faculty of Theology became the most prestigious of all. René Descartes visited several times to discuss his Discourse on the Method with academics, particularly Francis Sylvius," who was regarded as one of the greatest theologians of his century and a leading figure at the university. Sylvius notably opposed the Augustinus of the Bishop of Ypres, Cornelius Jansen. In 1692, during an episode referred to as the Fourberie de Douai (Cheating of Douai), pro-Jansenist academics were exiled by lettres de cachet.

==== Faculty of Law (1562–1795) ====
The faculties of Canon Law and Civil Law were highly active from the establishment of the University of Douai until the French Revolution. The Parliament of Flanders, which had its seat in Douai from 1713, later became the Court of Appeal of Douai, which encouraged law schools in Douai.

One student of the Douai Faculty of Law was Philippe-Antoine Merlin de Douai. The law schools in Douai trained many prominent lawyers from Flanders, including Adrian Maillart, François Modius, François Patou, Jacques Pollet, Mathieu Pinault, César Baggio, and Bertrand Cahuac.

==== Faculty of Medicine (1562–1793) ====
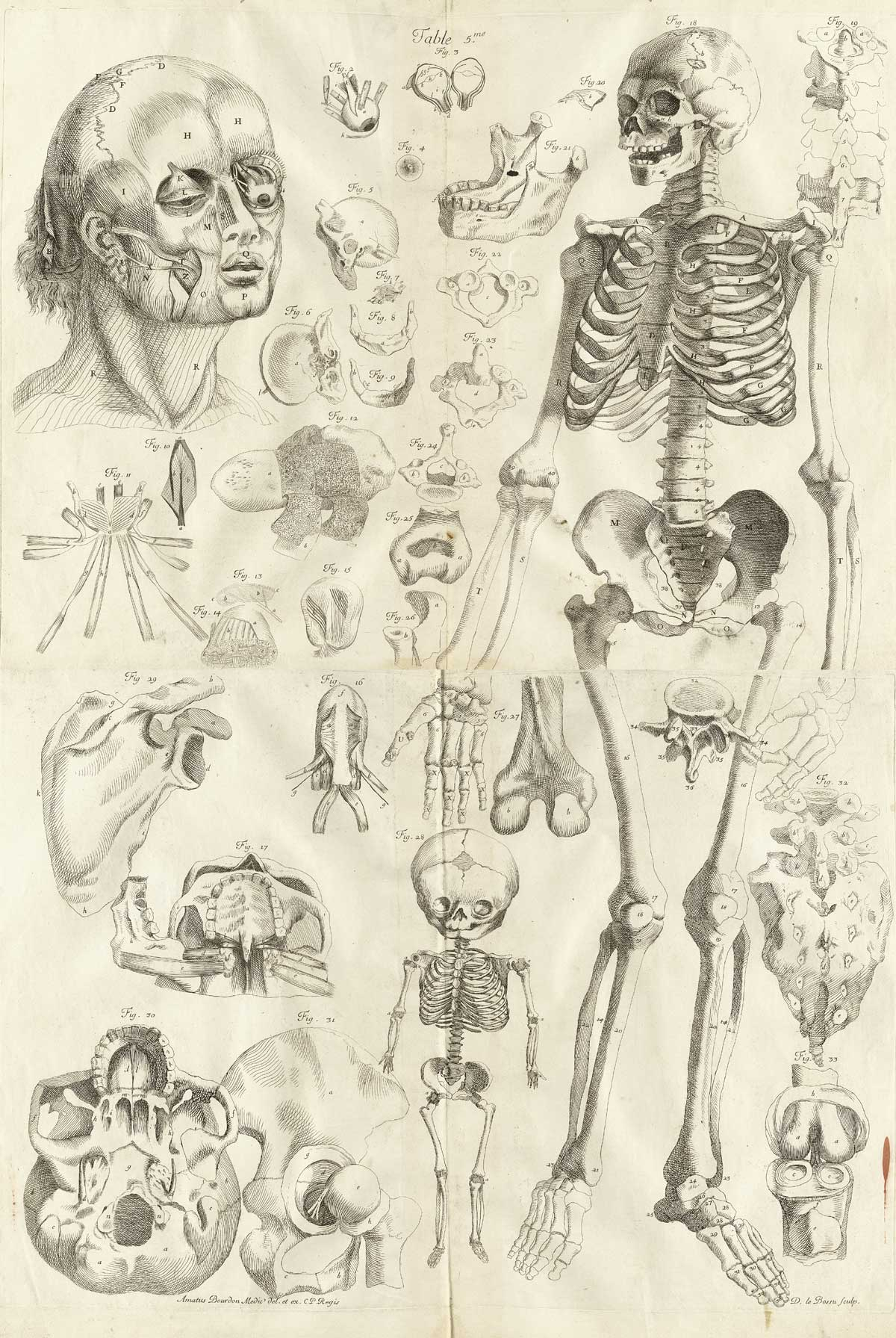
Tables anatomiques – Amé Bourdon (1678)

The Faculty of Medicine in Douai was advanced for its time. It had a medical anatomical theater as early as 1700. Notable figures associated with the faculty include Amé Bourdon in surgery and anatomy, Michel Brisseau in ophthalmology, and Jean-Baptiste Lestiboudois in medicine and botany.

In 1805, a school of medicine was established in Lille as the successor to the school of surgery founded there in 1705. This new institution overshadowed medical education in Douai and is now part of the University of Lille.

=== Faculties of the modern University of Douai ===
==== Faculty of sciences (1808–1815) ====
A Faculty of Sciences was re-established in Douai in 1808. However, higher education in the sciences later shifted to Lille, where a Faculty of Sciences was inaugurated by Louis Pasteur.

==== Faculty of Law (1854–1887) ====
The Faculty of Law in Douai was moved to Lille in 1887.

==== Faculty of literature (1808–1815, 1854–1887) ====
A Faculty of Literature was re-established in 1808 and transferred to Lille in 1887.

== Influence of the University of Douai ==
=== Dissemination of printed knowledge ===
Douai was a prominent center of neo-Latin literature.

It was known not only for its intellectual activity but also for its many master printers, who was involved in the dissemination of knowledge, primarily in Latin but also in French, across the Southern Netherlands.

=== Douay–Rheims Bible and Catholic studies ===
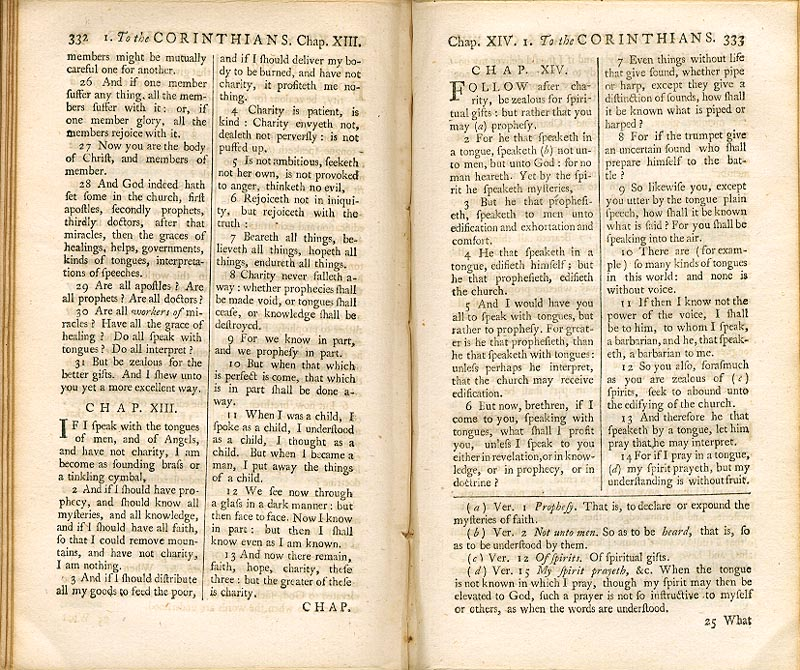
Douay–Rheims Bible : revision by Richard Challoner (1749)

Douai was an important center for Catholic studies. When the Holy See authorized the translation of the Bible into vernacular languages, the Douay–Rheims Bible became the first authorized Catholic Bible translated from Latin into English in 1609. Subsequent revisions of this translation were references for the Catholic Bible in English. It was also the Douay–Rheims Bible on which John Fitzgerald Kennedy took the oath of office as President of the United States in 1961.

The seminars in Douai trained much of the English Catholic clergy during the Counter-Reformation. The clergy trained in Douai also spread to various colonies, including Pierre-Philippe Potier in New France, Charles Carroll in the Maryland Colony, and Nicolas Trigault in China.

=== Religious and political influence ===
The University of Douai was a center of religious debate with significant political implications. Created to counter the Protestant Reformation, it also challenged royal authority, particularly in its opposition to Bossuet and Gallicanism. Its independence from temporal power was rooted in its history as a border institution between the Spanish Netherlands and the Kingdom of France. The chancellors and officials of the university served as advisers to the Catholic kings of Spain and France. The board of the University of Douai maintained relations with the courts of Louis XIV and Louis XV through figures like Philip Cospéan and Bossuet, and also had connections with Popes who initially contributed financially to the university's endeavors. During the French Revolution in 1791, the clergy at Douai began university Douaisian conditions before considering whether to swear an oath to the Civil Constitution of the Clergy, following the papal briefs Quod Aliquantum (March 10, 1791) and Caritas (April 13, 1791). These conditions were seen as a rejection of loyalty to Republican power.

=== Humanities and modernity ===
Even though many works of the 18th-century encyclopedists, such as The Encyclopedia by Diderot and d'Alembert, and later works like the Grand Dictionnaire Universel of the 19th century, were blacklisted, the university was gradually influenced by the ideas of modernity, the scientific revolution, and major discoveries. This is evident in the early work on mathematics and anatomy, which challenged the Galenic system, as well as in the changes in botanical and zoological classifications. These subjects were studied at Douai by Richard Gibbons, Charles Malapert, Amé Bourdon, and Jean-Baptiste Lestiboudois.

== Notable students and faculty ==
- William Allen
- William Bawden
- George Blackwell
- Amé Bourdon
- John Bowles
- Charles Carroll the Settler
- Richard Challoner
- François d'Aguilon
- Cornelis de Jode
- Thomas Dempster
- Franciscus Sylvius
- Grégoire de Saint-Vincent
- Olivier De Wree
- Nicholas Fitzherbert
- Edward Hawarden
- Giles Hussey
- Cuthbert Mayne
- Philippe-Antoine Merlin de Douai
- Daniel O'Connell
- Georges Palante
- John Payne
- Robert Southwell
- Honoré Tournély
- Charles Townley
- Nicolas Trigault
- Jean Vendeville
- Peter Wadding

== See also ==
- List of early modern universities in Europe

== Sources ==
- Cardon, Georges (1892). La fondation de l'Université de Douai (in French). Paris: F. Alcan.
- FASTI, a project on the history of universities
- H. de Ridder-Symoens, "The Place of the University of Douai in the Peregrinatio Academica Britannica", in Lines of Contact: Proceedings of the Second Conference of Belgian, British, Irish and Dutch historians of universities held in St Anne's College, Oxford, 15–17 September 1989, edited by Hilde De Ridder-Symoens and John M. Fletcher (Ghent, 1994), pp. 21–34.
- Andreas Loewe, "Richard Smyth and the Foundation of the University of Douai", Nederlands Archief voor Kerkgeschiedenis, 79 II (1999).
- Andreas Loewe, Richard Smyth and the Language of Orthodoxy : Re-Imagining Tudor Catholic Polemicism, Brill, Leiden, 2003 (= Studies in Medieval and Reformation Traditions).
