= Francis Sylvius =

Flemish Roman Catholic theologian

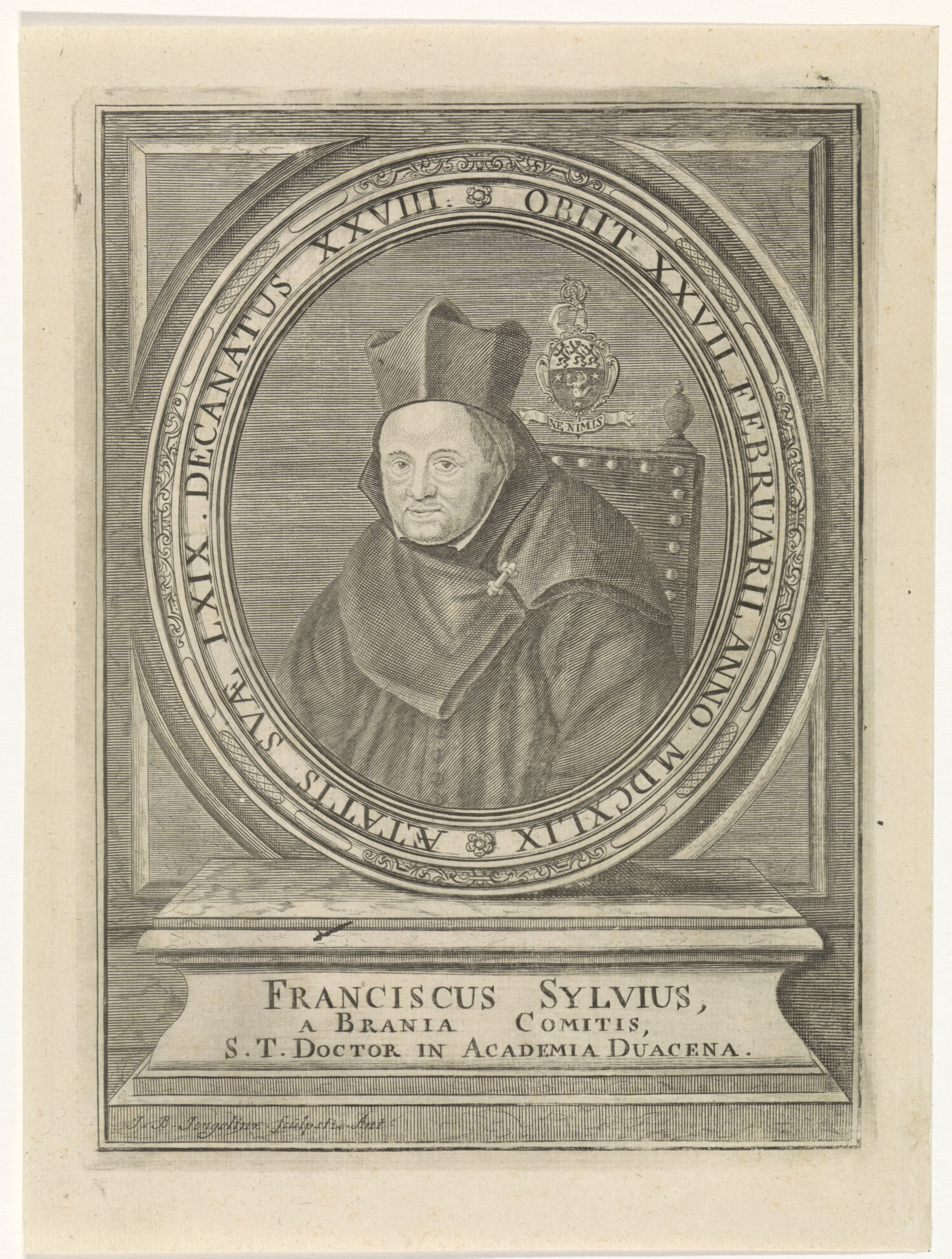
Francis Sylvius

Francis Sylvius (1581, in Braine-le-Comte, Hainault, now in Belgium – 22 February 1649, at Douai) was a Flemish Roman Catholic theologian.

== Life ==
After completing his course of humanities at Mons, he studied philosophy at the Catholic University of Leuven and theology at University of Douai, in a seminary founded by the bishop of Cambrai in connection with the faculty of theology. While studying theology he taught philosophy at the royal college. On 9 November 1610, he was made doctor of theology with the highest honours.

The faculty of theology wished to retain this promising scholar, but there was no chair vacant. A professor, Barthélemy Pierre de Lintra, resigned his position in favour of Sylvius, but, upon the death of Estius (20 September 1613), of the University of Douai, Sylvius succeeded him and later was called to direct the episcopal seminary in which he had been a student. He was appointed (1 February 1618) canon of the collegiate Church of St. Amat, and finally dean (28 January 1622), and to this title was added that of vice-chancellor of the university.

When in 1648 the theologians of Leuven sought to win the University of Douai over to Jansenism, Sylvius opposed them vigorously; but throughout the controversy he preserved the moderation of his character. Absorbed by study and his duties, his life was largely undisturbed for thirty years until his death. He was buried in the choir of the Church of St. Amat, and an epitaph engraved on his tomb recalled, with his titles and qualities, his attachment to Augustine of Hippo and Thomas Aquinas as a faithful disciple of one and a lucid interpreter of the other, also his liberality towards the poor and religious, whom he made his heirs.

== Works ==
At the commencement of his works, as at the beginning of his lectures, he professed his intention to remain submissive to the authority of the Roman Catholic Church. He gained his reputation as a theologian chiefly through his commentary on the Summa of Thomas Aquinas. It contained four folio volumes, which he was prevailed upon to publish.

He wrote also several treatises on dogmatic theology and controversy, and some on moral theology. Among his other works may be mentioned:

- an edition with notes, of Binsfeld's "Enchiridion theologiae pastoralis", which had great success in Belgium and France, where it was the first manual of theology used by seminarians;
- resolutions of cases of conscience, in which he showed himself a moderate Probabilist.

He wrote also commentaries on Genesis, Exodus, Leviticus, and Numbers, which were praised by Calmet. He adapted the Instructions of Charles Borromeo for use of the Church in Belgium, and he made additions to the Summa Conciliorum of Carranza. His complete works were published by Norbert d'Elbecque at Antwerp in 1698, in six folio volumes, the first of which contains the life of Sylvius. This edition was reproduced at Venice in 1726; the editor omitted the works of Sylvius against Jansenism.
