= Doctor fundatissimus =

Doctor fundatissimus, Latin for 'best founded Teacher', is a title awarded to the following Roman Catholic academics:

- Giles of Rome (c. 1243 – 1316), archbishop of Bourges
- Willem Hessels van Est (Latinized as Estius) (1542–1613), Dutch Catholic commentator on the Pauline epistles
