= Georges Palante =

French philosopher and sociologist (1862–1925)

Georges Toussaint Léon Palante
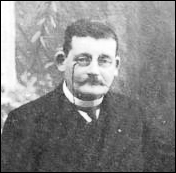
- Palante in 1914
- Born: 20 November 1862; Pas-de-Calais, France
- Died: 5 August 1925 (aged 62); Saint-Brieuc, France

Philosophical work
- Era: 20th-century philosophy
- Region: Western philosophy
- School: Nietzscheanism; Precursor to existentialism
- Main interests: Politics, ethics
- Notable ideas: Individualism

Georges Toussaint Léon Palante (20 November 1862 – 5 August 1925) was a French philosopher and sociologist.

Palante advocated aristocratic individualist ideas similar to Friedrich Nietzsche and Arthur Schopenhauer. He was opposed to Émile Durkheim's holism, promoting methodological individualism instead.

== Life ==
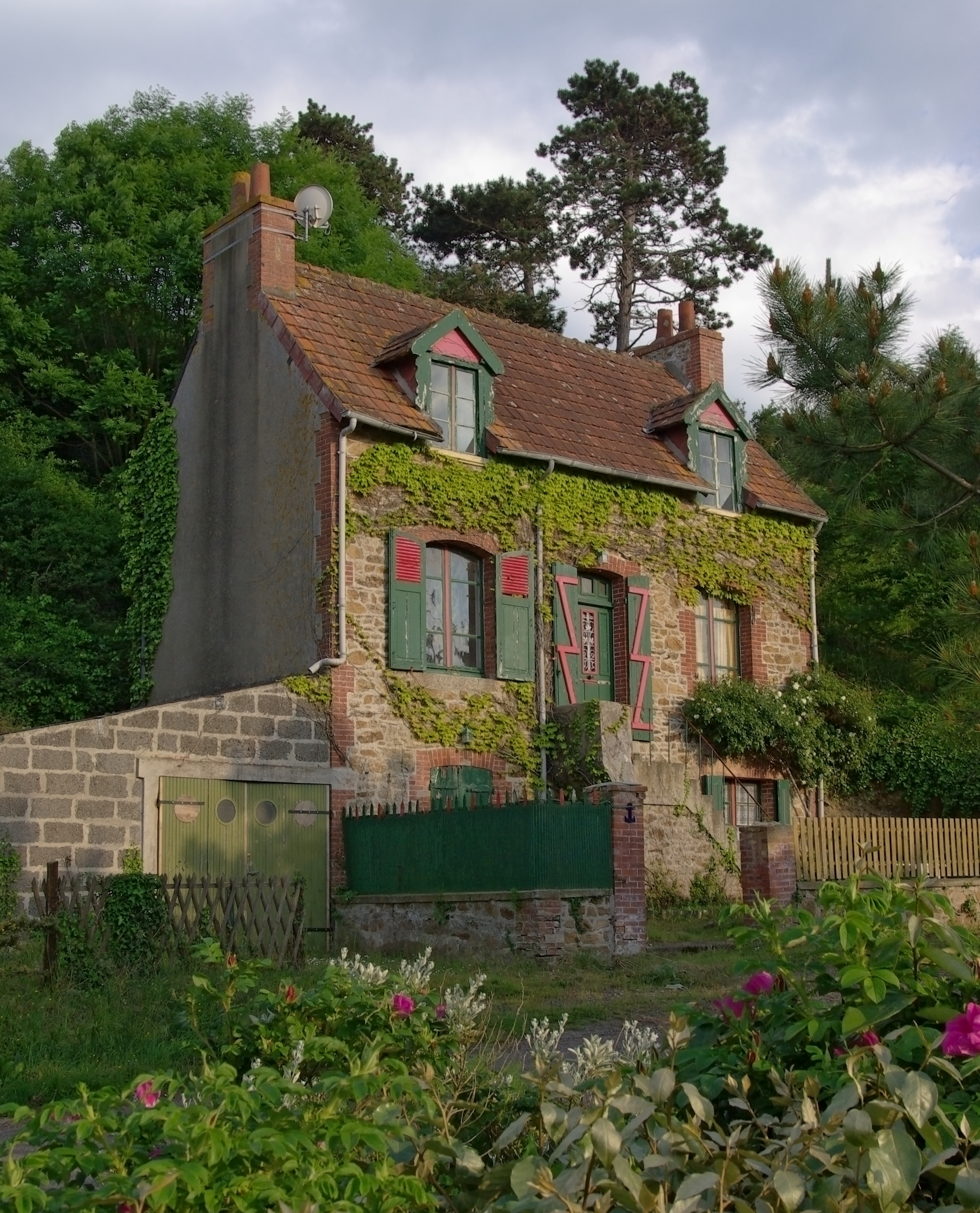
Palante's house in Hillion

Palante was born in Saint-Laurent-Blangy in the Pas-de-Calais on 20 November 1862. His father Emile Palante was an accountant from Liège. Palante's older brother Emile died when he was only five years old. He studied successively at the college of Arras where he excelled in Latin, then at Lycée Louis-le-Grand where he earned his bachelor's degree.

He obtained a Bachelor of Arts at the University of Douai. In 1885, he began his career as professor of philosophy at Aurillac, where he met his future wife Louise Genty, whom he married three years later. The couple had a daughter named Germaine in 1890. Between 1886 and 1888, he studied in Châteauroux. In 1888, he received his agrégation in philosophy.

Palante separated from his first wife in 1890 and was appointed to teach at the Lycée de Saint-Brieuc, Brittany, then in the following years at Valenciennes, La Rochelle and Niort. In 1893, he translated a work by Theobald Ziegler and began to publish articles. He returned in 1898 to the Lycée de Saint-Brieuc, at which he worked for the remainder of his teaching career. Meanwhile, he continued to work on his philosophical ideas, publishing articles and essays in journals. Palante published collections of his articles in various books, notably Combat pour l'individu (Fight for the Individual) in 1904 and La Sensibilité individualiste (The Individualist Sensibility) in 1909.

In 1907, Palante completed a draft doctoral thesis at the Sorbonne, but it was never authorized. However, he published the draft under the title Antinomies entre l'individu et la société (Antinomies Between the Individual and Society) in 1912, expanding it two years later under the title Pessimisme et individualisme (Pessimism and Individualism).

In 1908, Palante stood in municipal elections as a socialist candidate, but he was not elected. He took over from Jules de Gaultier at the philosophy journal Mercure de France, holding the position for thirteen years. In 1916, he befriended the writer Louis Guilloux. During this period, Palante lived a bohemian lifestyle, drinking heavily and notoriously marking his students' essays in a local brothel. He married his second wife Louise Pierre in 1923 and retired from teaching a year later. On 5 August 1925, Palante died from a self-inflicted bullet wound to the head. The reasons for Palante's suicide are not certain, but he is known to have been suffering from acromegaly, a condition diagnosed when he was a student. A severe degenerative disease which had no cure at time, it was making his life more and more painful.

== Philosophy ==
A thoroughgoing Individualist, he admired Friedrich Nietzsche and showed early interest in the work of Sigmund Freud. His thinking is also critical towards the mass "herd instinct", which he thought oppresses and prevents individuals from developing fully. However, he did not oppose social networks and insisted that his philosophy did not seek to destroy society for the benefit of the individual, but to help to build new networks of social interaction. In sociology, he objected to the holistic model espoused by Émile Durkheim.

== Political ideology ==
Initially close to socialist theories, while critical of Marxist state socialism, he increasingly rejected it as a political ideal, although he did participate in 1908 municipal elections as a socialist candidate. He rejected the label anarchist, but his ideas are nevertheless often regarded as a form of anarchism or at least as libertarianism. His ideas have some commonality with classical liberalism, including his definition of the individual and his opposition to various barriers to trade. However, he opposed it in so far as in his view individual being is not determined by rational choice since social determinism is constantly at work. In the economic field, he also objected to capitalists seeking profits to the detriment of the poor and called for a "politics of the belly".

== Influence ==
Louis Guilloux wrote Souvenirs sur Georges Palante (Memories of Georges Palante) and took his inspiration from Palante to model his character Cripure (short for Critique de la raison pure; in English, Critique of pure reason) in his novel Le Sang noir (Dark Blood). He also puts Palante's ideas into the mouths of characters in other novels.

Palante is quoted in one of the footnotes to Albert Camus' classic treatise The Rebel. Jean Grenier, who was Camus' philosophy teacher, met Palante and devoted a full chapter to him in his book Les Grèves (The Seashores).

Palante is also quoted on the first page of Nobel Prize winning author André Gide's famous novel Lafcadio's Adventures which deals with "the idea of the unmotivated crime"; the quote reads "Pour ma part, mon choix est fait. J'ai opté pour l'athéisme social. Cet athéisme, je l'ai ex-primé depuis une quinzaine d'années, dans une série d'ou-vrages..." and came from a 1912 publication.

Michel Onfray's thesis and first published book Physiologie de Georges Palante (Georges Palante's Physiology) contributed to the renewed interest in his work. The 2002 and 2005 reissues of the book were subtitled portrait d’un nietzschéen de gauche (Portrait of a Left-wing Nietzschean).

== Writings ==
- Précis de Sociologie, Paris, Alcan, 1901.
- Combat pour l’individu, Paris, Alcan, 1904.
- La Sensibilité individualiste, Paris, Alcan, 1909.
- Les Antinomies entre l’individu et la société, Paris, Alcan, 1912.
- La Philosophie du bovarysme, Jules de Gaultier, Paris, Mercure de France, 1912.
- Autour d’une thèse refusée en Sorbonne, Revue du Mercure de France, 1912.
- Pessimisme et individualisme, Paris, Alcan, 1914.
- Du nouveau en politique ! Des problèmes nouveaux ! Des partis nouveaux ! Des hommes nouveaux !, Duperret, 1919.
