= Jean-Baptiste Lestiboudois =

- Born: 30 January 1715; Douai
- Died: 20 March 1804 (aged 89); Lille

Jean-Baptiste Lestiboudois (30 January 1715, Douai – 20 March 1804, Lille) was a French botanist and pharmacist. His son François Joseph Lestiboudois (1759–1815) and grandson Gaspard Thémistocle Lestiboudois (1797–1876) were also botanists.

Lestiboudois studied pharmacy at a local hospital in Douai and at the University of Douai. After receiving his license to practice medicine in 1739, he relocated to the city of Lille. During the same year, Lestiboudois was appointed chief pharmacist of the French army. From 1758, he served as an apothecary at the army headquarters of Bas-Rhin, during which time Lestiboudois studied plants that occurred in the vicinity of Cologne and Braunschweig.

In 1770 he was appointed professor of botany by the magistrate of Lille, and from 1796 served as a professor of natural history at the École centrale du département du Nord à Lille. As a professor he trained naturalist Palisot de Beauvois as a postgraduate.

Along with Pierre Riquet, Lestiboudois was editor of Pharmacopoeia, jussu Senatus insulensis tertiary edita. In 1774, he issued Carte de botanique, a botanical chart that combined the system of Joseph Pitton de Tournefort with that of Carl Linnaeus.

== Publications ==
- Pharmacopoea, jussu senatus insulensis tertio edita [a P.-J. Riquet et J.-B. Lestiboudois], 1772.
- Abrégé élémentaire de botanique, à l'usage de l'École de botanique de Lille, 1774.
- Zoologie élémentaire, ou Abrégé de l'histoire naturelle des animaux, à l'usage des jeunes commençans (with François Joseph Lestiboudois), 1802.
