= Louis Guilloux =

French writer (1899–1980)

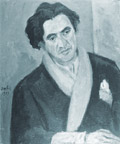
- portrait of Guilloux by Eugène Dabit
- Born: 15 January 1899; Saint-Brieuc, Brittany, France
- Died: 14 October 1980 (aged 81); Saint-Brieuc, Brittany; France
- Notable work: Le Sang noir, La Maison du Peuple, Le Pain des Rêves, Le Jeu de Patience, OK Joe!

Louis Guilloux (15 January 1899 – 14 October 1980) was a Breton writer born in Saint-Brieuc, Brittany, where he lived throughout his life. He is known for his Social Realist novels describing working-class life and political struggles in the mid-twentieth century. His best-known book is Le Sang noir (Blood Dark), which has been described as a "prefiguration of Sartre's La Nausée."

== Life and work ==
Guilloux's father was a shoemaker and socialist activist, a background that Guilloux describes in his first book La Maison du Peuple (The House of the People), which centres on the struggles of a shoemaker called Quéré as seen through the eyes of his young son. The story describes how Quéré's idealistic political activism threatens his small business as he loses custom by pushing against ingrained conservatism. Nevertheless, he manages to build self-help cooperatives on the model of Proudhonism.

In high school, Guilloux befriended the philosophy tutor Georges Palante, an anarchist thinker who later killed himself. Palante's despair inspired Guilloux to create the character of Cripure, the anguished anti-hero of Le Sang Noir (1935), which is considered his masterpiece. The name Cripure is a contraction of "Critique de la raison pure" (Critique of Pure Reason). He also commemorated his old tutor in a memoir.

He married in 1924, and published La Maison du Peuple in 1927.

The success of the book led to a long series of novels on socially committed themes, usually based in his native Brittany. His masterpiece Le Sang Noir was notable for its departure from his earlier, more straightforwardly socialist literature, since it contains elements of what was later associated with an existentialist or absurdist vision. It centres on the suicidal thoughts of the anti-hero, Cripure, who feels overwhelming disgust at humanity in the destructive circumstances of militarism during World War I. Contrasted with the figure of Cripure is the nominal hero, Lucien, who aspires to work for a better future. But the grotesque and self-excoriating visions of Cripure are repeatedly portrayed as more powerful and compelling than Lucien's idealism. The book was translated into English under the title Bitter Victory.

Le Pain des Rêves (Bread of Dreams), which he wrote during the Occupation, won the Prix du roman populiste in 1942. After the liberation of France, Guilloux worked as an interpreter for the American army of occupation. In OK Joe! he explored racial inequalities and injustice in the segregated American army of the time. Guilloux's experiences at this time are described by Alice Kaplan in her 2006 book The Interpreter.

His 1949 novel Le Jeu de Patience (Game of Patience) won the Prix Renaudot. It has been described as his most experimental work, "an intricate text demanding patient reconstitution by the reader. Micro- and macro-history collide: the horrors of war, and anarchist and Popular Front politics or right-wing coups, impinge violently on private dramas. It is a haunted kaleidoscope, often hallucinatory."

Guilloux was also a translator of a number of books, including the novel Home to Harlem written by black American author Claude McKay, published in 1932 under the title Ghetto Noir. He also translated John Steinbeck, Margaret Kennedy, and Robert Didier, and some of the Hornblower series of novels by C.S. Forester. Towards the end of his life, he created scripts for television adaptations of literary classics.

Louis Guilloux was friendly with many notable writers. He knew the philosopher Jean Grenier from his teenage years, and was close to Albert Camus. He was also friends with André Malraux and Jean Guéhenno. Camus praised his work highly, and compared his story Compagnons (Companions) to Leo Tolstoy's The Death of Ivan Ilyich.

=== Political activities ===
Guilloux was active in left-wing causes. In 1927, he signed the petition, published on 15 April in the magazine Europe, against the law on the general organization of the nation for war, objecting to the restrictions on intellectual independence and freedom of opinion.

He was Secretary of the first World Congress of Anti-fascist Writers in 1935, then became head of Red Aid International (later known as Secours Populaire - The People's Aid), which helped refugees from Nazi Germany and later assisted the Spanish Republicans.

Following a discussion with Ilya Ehrenbourg, André Gide invited him to accompany him on his famous trip to the USSR in 1936, in which Eugène Dabit also travelled. However, he refused to endorse the Soviet system.

After World War II he helped to establish several provincial Maisons de la Culture. In 1953 he worked for Éditions Rencontre in producing the "Great Novels" series, offering reprints of classic novels.

He died in Saint-Brieuc in 1980 and was buried in the Cimetière Saint-Michel.

== Prix Louis Guilloux ==
In 1983 the Conseil général des Côtes-d'Armor created the Prix Louis-Guilloux "to perpetuate the literary ideals and values of the Breton writer". The prize is granted each year to a work in the French language which is characterised by "the humane qualities of generous thought, refusing all dualism and all sacrifice of individuality in favour of ideological abstractions".

== Published books ==
- La Maison du Peuple (1927)
- Lettres de Proudhon, choisies et annotées par L. Guilloux en collaboration avec Daniel Halévy (1929)
- Dossier confidentiel (1930)
- Compagnons (1931)
- Souvenirs sur Georges Palante (1931)
- Hyménée (1932)
- Le Lecteur écrit, compilation de courriers de lecteurs du journal « L'intransigeant » (1933)
- Angélina (1934)
- Le Sang Noir (1935)
- Histoire de brigands, récits (1936)
- Le Pain des Rêves (1942)
- Le Jeu de Patience (1949)
- Absent de Paris (1952)
- Parpagnacco ou la Conjuration (1954)
- Les Batailles Perdues (1960)
- Cripure, pièce tirée du Sang Noir (1961)
- La Confrontation (1968)
- La Bretagne que j'aime (Ma Bretagne) (1973)
- Salido, suivi de OK Joe ! (1976)
- Coco Perdu (1978)
- Carnets 1921-1944 (1978)

=== Posthumous ===
- Grand Bêta, conte (1981)
- Carnets 1944-1974 (1982)
- L'Herbe d'oubli, mémoires (1984)
- Labyrinthe (1999)
- Vingt ans ma belle âge (1999)
