= François Fayt =

French composer (born 1946)

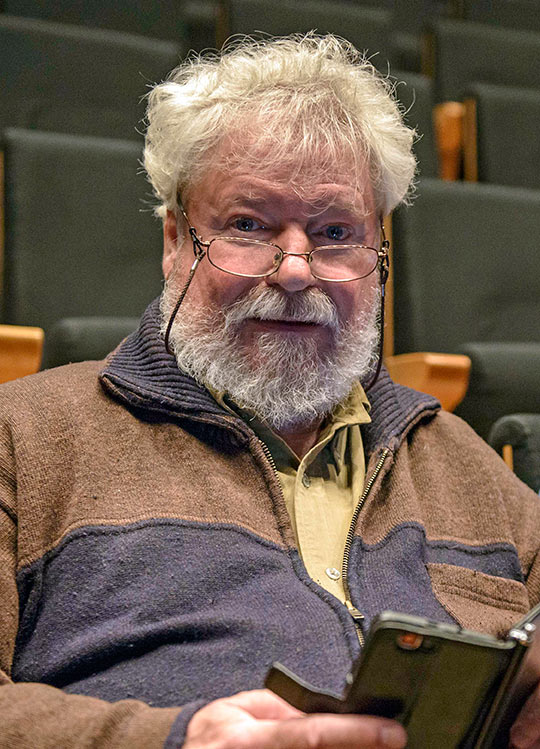
François Fayt

François Fayt (born 1946) is a French composer. Born in Argences, he studied music at the Conservatory of Versailles and then the École Normale de Musique de Paris. He took advanced courses with Marcel Ciampi and Aldo Ciccolini.

He studied composition with Eugene Kurtz, a professor at the University of Michigan and New York. In 1984, he met Marcel Maréchal, director of the National Theatre of Marseille. The meeting led to many commissions for incidental music, especially for the Théâtre du Rond-Point des Champs-Élysées, and an opera, l'Arbre de ma (The May Tree), performed in 1993 in a staging by Pierre Constant, under the direction of Frédéric Chaslin.

At the same time, he wrote symphonic works, lyrical music and chamber music. His string quartet, titled Ellison's Quatuor was established on 24 June 2004 at the Summer Horrues Festival of Music by the Brussels String Quartet.

Jean-Marc Luisada and the Australian String Quartet commissioned his String Quintet with Piano for the millennium celebrations in Sydney. Svetlin Roussev, principal soloist with the Orchestre Philharmonique de Radio France, and Luisada commissioned Epilogue a piece for violin and piano. In 2014 his opera Le Sang Noir, based on the novel of the same name was premiered in German (as Das Schwartze Blut) at Erfurt.

Fayt has also composed sacred music, including a Requiem, a Gospel of John, and a Stabat Mater performed in July, 2009 at the Festival Saint Riquier'under the direction of Jean-Paul Penin.
