= François Joseph Lestiboudois =

French botanist (1759–1815)

François Joseph Lestiboudois (20 January 1759 – 26 July 1815) was a French botanist. Born at Lille, he was the son of Jean-Baptiste Lestiboudois (1715–1804), a professor of botany at the École centrale du département du Nord à Lille and was the father of botanist Gaspard Thémistocle Lestiboudois (1797–1876).

Lestiboudois was a professor of botany at Lille and a member of the Société des sciences, de l'agriculture et des arts de Lille. He is best remembered for publication of Botanographie belgique (first edition in 1781). He was also the author of Botanographie universelle, ou, Tableau général des végétaux (1804). He died in Lille in 1815.

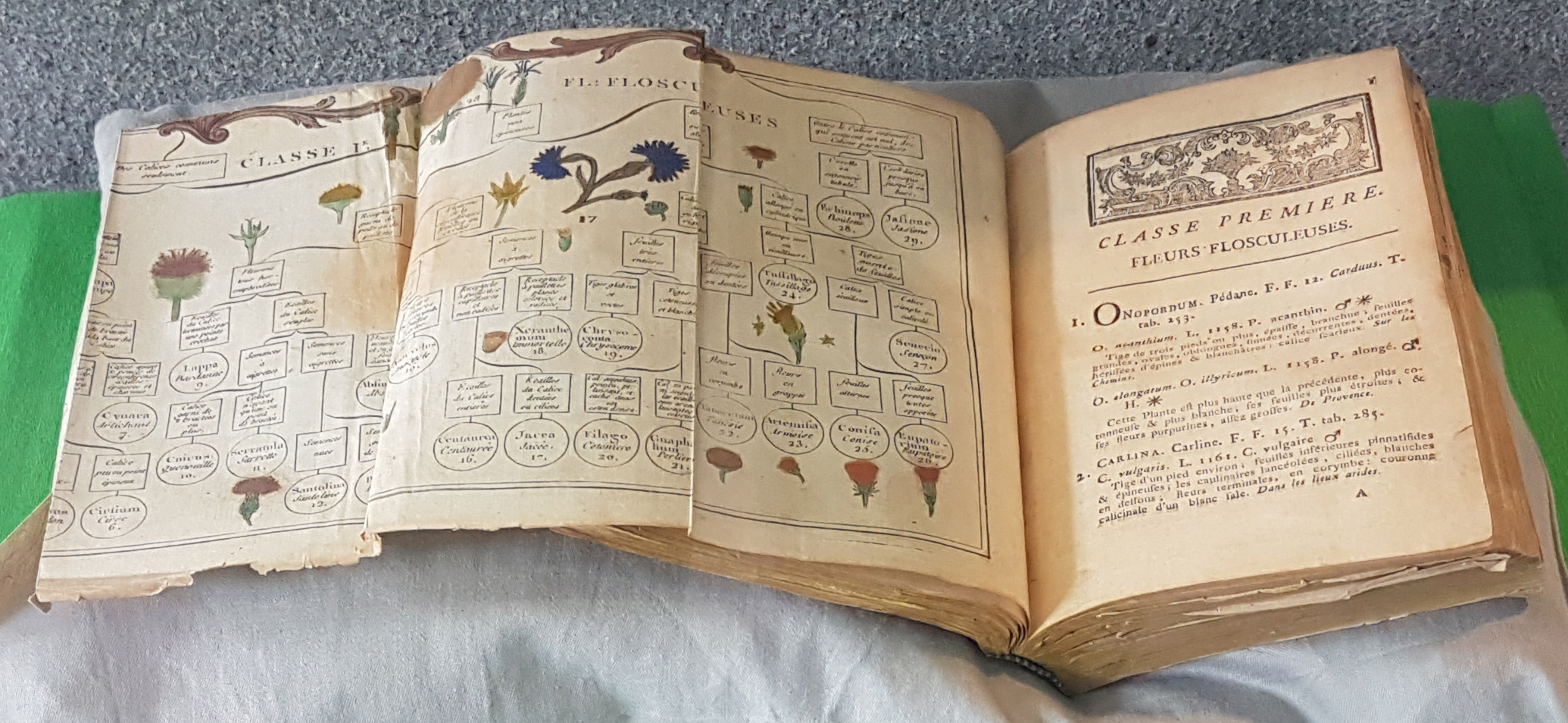
Botanographie belgique, etc. (Lille, 1781)

== Bibliography ==
- Botanographie belgique, ou Méthode pour connoître facilement toutes les plantes qui croissent naturellement : ou que l'on cultive communément dans les provinces septentrionales de la France. A Lille : De l'Imprimerie de J.B. Henry ..., 1781 - Belgian botanography; method for easy identification of naturally or commonly grown plants in the northern provinces of France.
- Botanographie universelle, ou, Tableau général des végétaux. Lille : Vanackere, an XII de la République [i.e. 1804] - Universal botanography; general table of plants.
