= Blood Dark =

1935 novel by Louis Guilloux

- Author: Louis Guilloux
- Original title: Le Sang noir
- Translator: Samuel Putnam (1936), Laura Marris (2017)
- Language: French
- Publisher: Robert M. McBride & Co
- Publication date: 1935
- Publication place: France
- English publication date: 1936

Blood Dark (French: Le Sang noir, lit. 'The Black Blood'; also published in English as Bitter Victory) is a 1935 novel by the French writer Louis Guilloux.

== Origins ==
Blood Dark was based in Guilloux's memories of his philosophy tutor, Georges Palante, an anarchist thinker who eventually killed himself in 1925. It is notable for its departure from the author's earlier, more straightforwardly socialist literature, since it contains elements of what was later associated with an existentialist or absurdist vision.

== Plot ==
One day in 1917 an aging philosophy tutor, nicknamed Cripure, feels unable to give advice to a student who is departing for the front in World War I. Amidst the horror of the war, he feels increasing disgust at life. He remembers how, years ago, he lost his wife. He is now living alone, supported only by Maïa, his slovenly housekeeper. His youthful promise as a writer and thinker has long since evaporated, and his body is becoming disturbingly abnormal as his feet become excessively large due to an illness. He hates himself, his colleagues and his students. He takes a class at which the students play up. In the afternoon he consoles himself with drink.

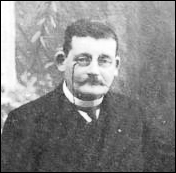
Georges Palante, inspiration for Cripure

As the evening wears on he learns about disasters and local tragedies, deaths, robberies and betrayals which convince him of the irredeemable corruption of humanity. French soldiers are becoming mutinous as the war continues without hope of an end. Cripure becomes involved in an altercation at the railway station as disaffected soldiers riot. He hits a jingoistic "patriot" and is challenged to a duel, which he accepts, as he is convinced that it will put his miserable life to an end. To his surprise local people rally round to support him, including his housekeeper and old friends. Cripure's challenger is discovered to be a hypocrite and is forced to back off but Cripure feels that he has been robbed of his death.

Saved from death, Cripure has nevertheless to face the destruction by his dogs of his notes for what he considers his final book and revenge on the stupidity of the world. Unable to stand up to this new ordeal, he shoots himself.

== Reception ==
The novel was highly praised, and was quickly translated. The English-language version, published under the title Bitter Victory, was described by Time magazine as "one of the strongest French novels since Celine's Journey to the End of the Night... it has much in common with Celine's masterpiece in its mood of intense disgust, its savage satirical portraits, its hatred of hypocrisy and its wild, grotesque humor." A second English translation, Blood Dark, translated by Laura Marris, with an introduction by Alice Kaplan, was published by New York Review Books Classics in 2017.

The contrast between the self-disgust of Cripure and the nominal hero, Lucien, who aspires to work for a better future has caused much comment, since the self-excoriating visions of Cripure are repeatedly portrayed as more powerful and compelling than Lucien's idealism.

Francis J. Greene has described Blood Dark as a "prefiguration of Sartre's La Nausée", because of its concentration on the psychological alienation of an individual.

== Dramatisations ==
Blood Dark was made into a TV film in 2006, directed by Peter Kassovitz and produced by BFC productions (Françoise Castro) and France 3. Cripure was played by Rufus. The adaptation was written by Michel Martens. It was broadcast on France 3 on 14 April 2007. The drama won awards for best screenplay and best actor (Rufus) at the Festival du film de télévision de Luchon.

On 29 Nov 2014, an opera based on the novel, titled Das Schwarze Blut (The Black Blood), by the French composer François Fayt was premiered, in German, at the Erfurt Theater. Marc Adam was the stage director, and Jean-Paul Penin conducted.
