= Flandria Illustrata =

1641 book by Antonius Sanderus

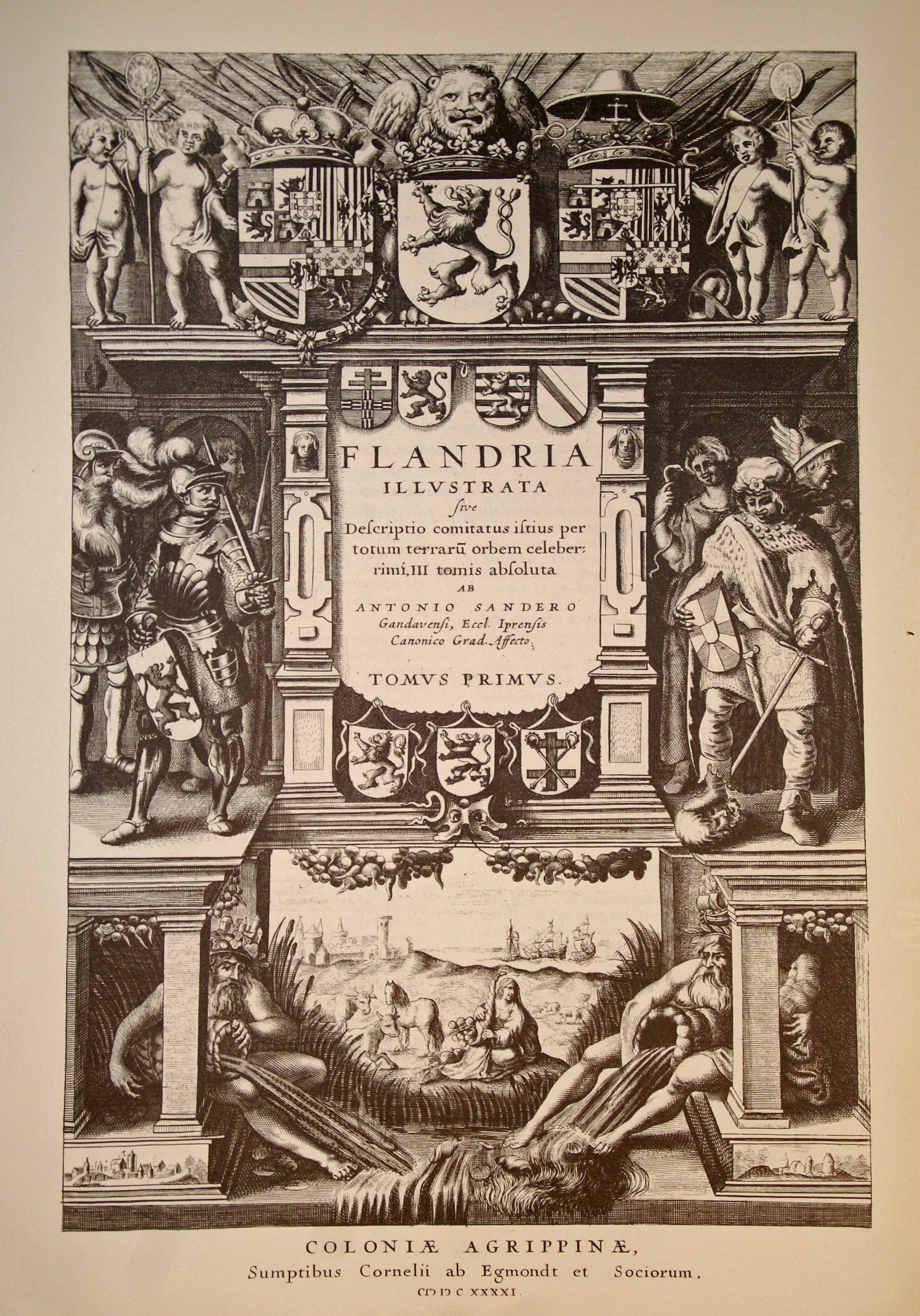
Front page of the first edition (1641) of the Flandria Illustrata

Flandria Illustrata is a historiographical and topographical work from 1641 by the Flemish canon Antonius Sanderus. It contains historical descriptions of the main towns and villages of the former County of Flanders, in addition to the lives of its counts and bishops. The works is lavishly illustrated. It contains etched portraits of historical figures and heraldic representations but it is specifically known for its maps and topographical views which form an important source for historic study. The Latin work knew several editions and translations until well into the 18th century. In Dutch it was published under the title Verheerlykt Vlaandre (Glorify Flanders).

== Sanderus' predecessors ==
Sanderus tells us in his Sanderus Apologidion that the biggest inspiration for his Flandria Illustrata was the Theatrum sive Hollandiae Comitatus et urbium nova descriptio Marcus Zuerius Boxhornius (Boxhorn Nl), which in 1632 was published by the Amsterdam based publisher and engraver Henricus Hondius. It was Sanderus' goal to surpass his predecessors, both in terms of completeness and quality.

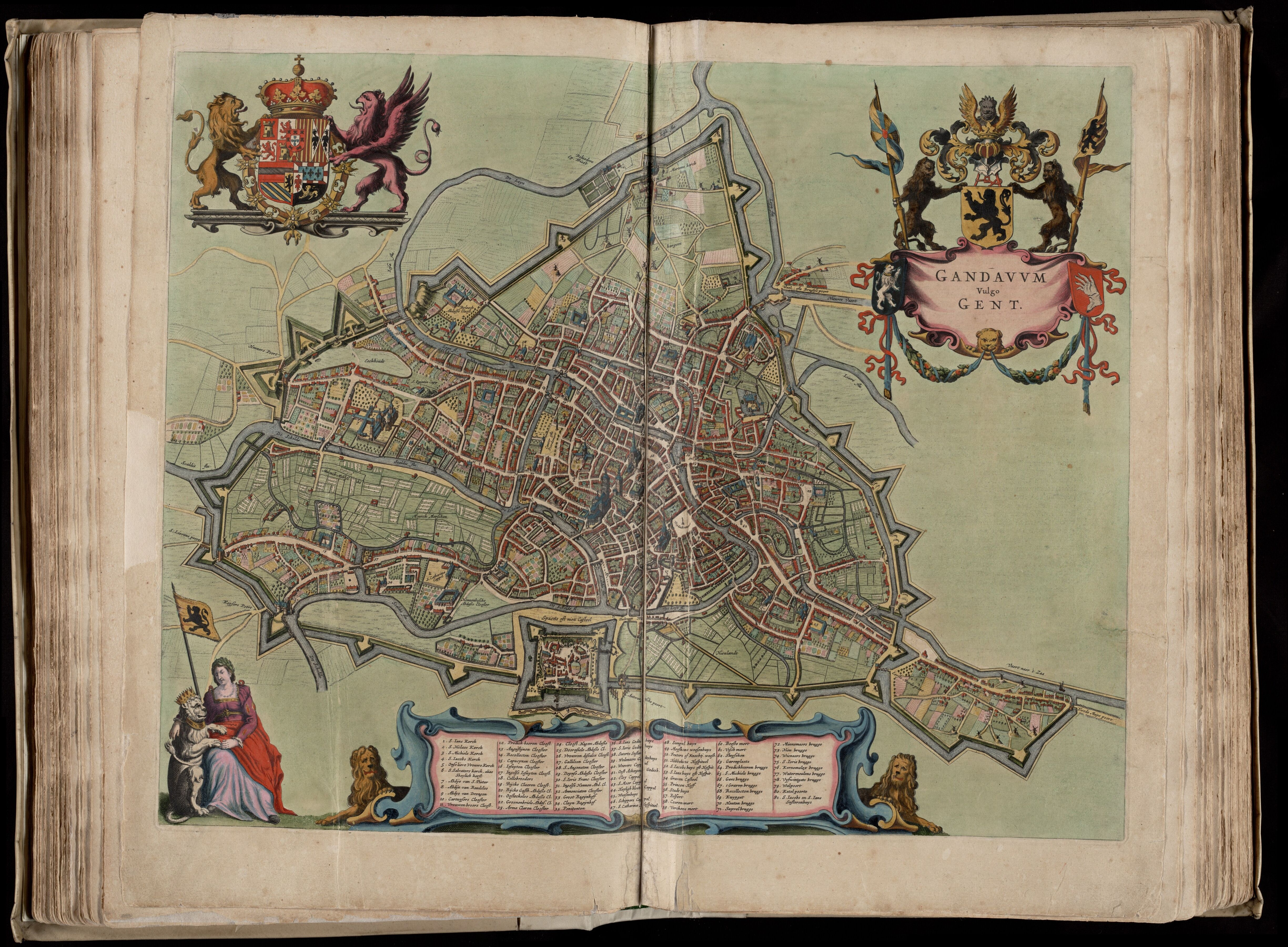
City map of Ghent from Flandria Illustrata

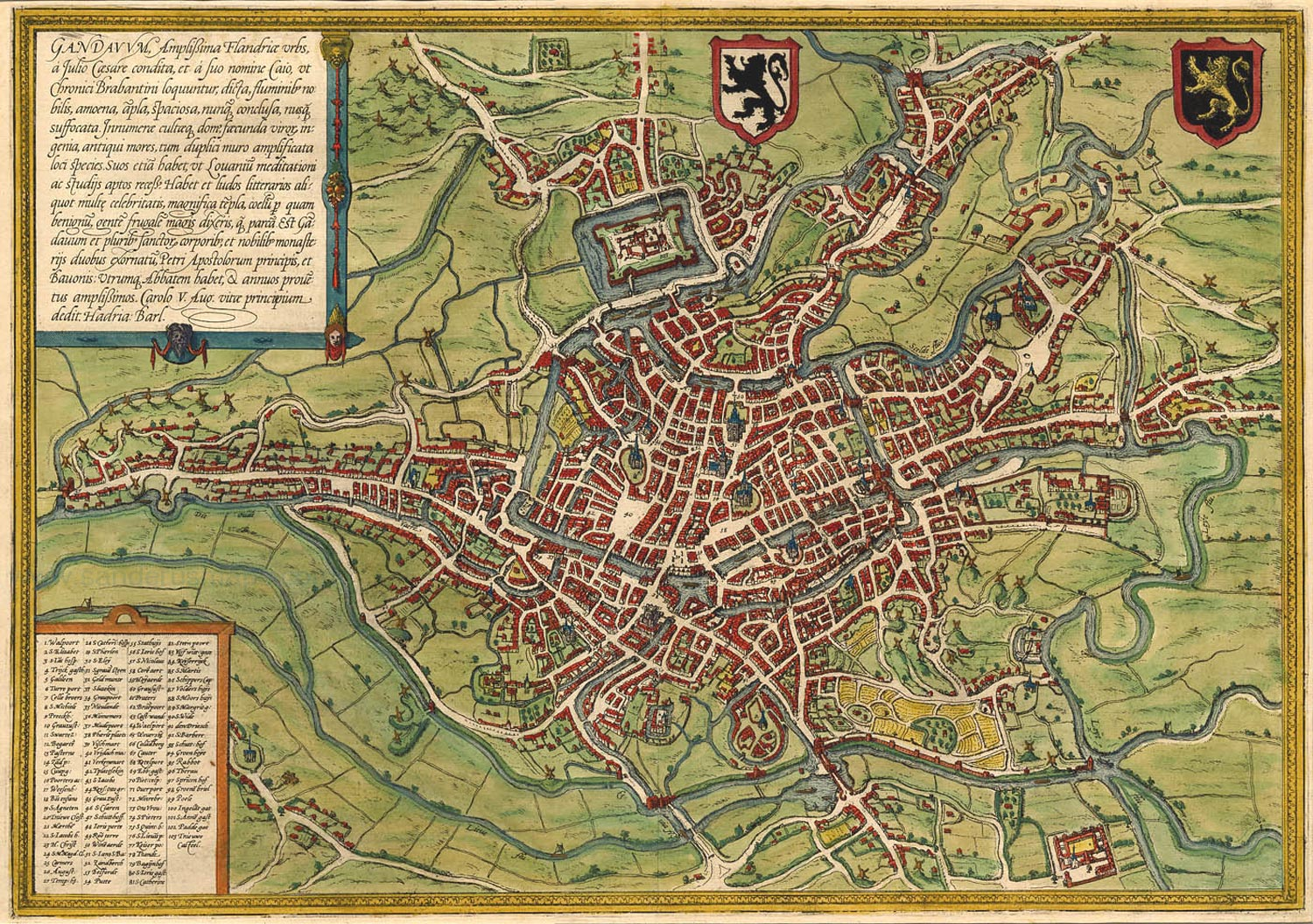
City map of Ghent from Civitates Orbis Terrarum

== Illustrations ==
As the title Flandria Illustrata underlines it is more lavishly illustrated than its earlier Dutch example. Apart from city maps in cavalier projection, major civil and ecclesiastic buildings and structures such as town halls, guild houses, fortifications, churches and convents are represented, mostly in bird's eye view. Rural places are often represented with a view of the local castle or country house, underscoring the feodal structure of the county. Many illustrations have been provided by the artist and surveyor Vedastus Du Plouich. City maps of larger cities such as Brugge and Ghent however are based on older published sources such as Braun and Hogenberg's 'Civitates Orbis Terrarum'. In the case of the map of Ghent for example the map is oriented in a different direction and the representation of some streets and fortifications is updated.

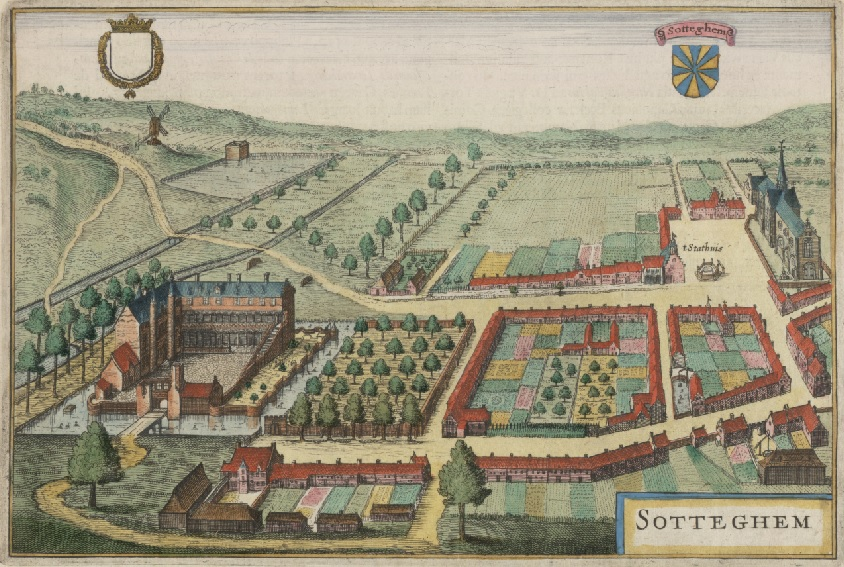
The town and castle of Zottegem. Hand coloured etching from Flandria Illustrata

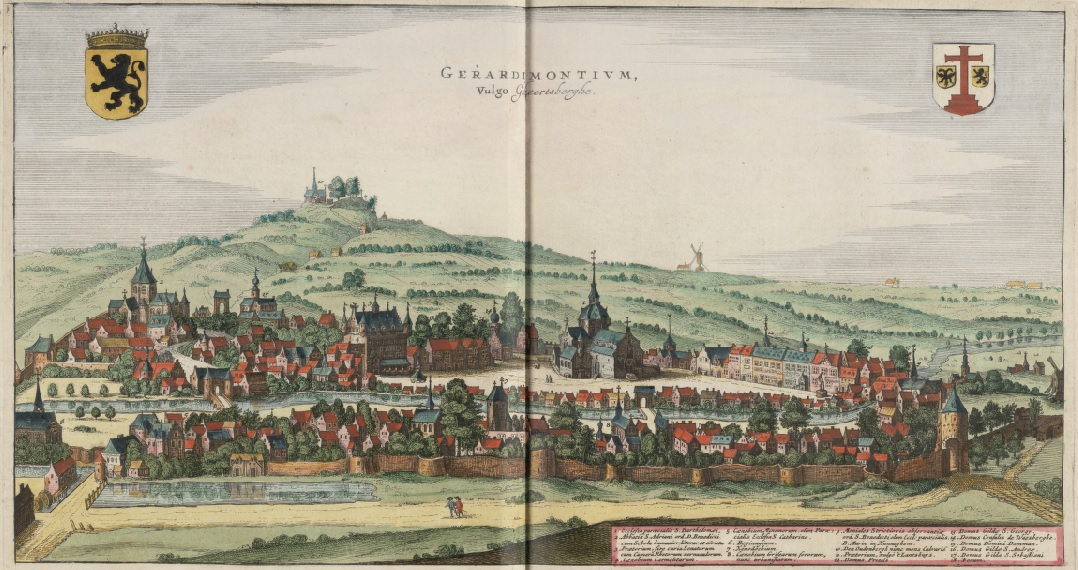
The town of Geraardsbergen with the Abbey of Saint Adrian. Hand coloured etching from Flandria Illustrata

== Publication ==
The writing and publishing of Flandria Illustrata did not run without a hitch. After the plan was conceived, Sanderus contacted the publisher Henricus Hondius, who had published the work of Boxhorn. The contact went through an intermediary named Johannes D'Hondt, a nephew of the publisher and an acquaintance of Sanderus. There was one major problem: Hondius, based in a Calvinist Republic, was a Protestant. This would mean that the book would be difficult to obtain in Catholic Flanders, but it would also put Sanderus, a canon, in a bad light. Protestant publishers had already found a solution to this problem: the book was printed and published in the Protestant Republic, but under the name of a Catholic publisher from Cologne.

From 1632 Sanderus began with the first studies for his work. In 1634 he signed a contract with Hondius. After some time tensions arose: Hondius had begun the work with the material he already received, but had to interrupt the production process repeatedly because of articles and drawings that were still lacking. Hondius himself remained not free from blame: he sent back several drawings and maps for (unnecessary) corrections while failing to implement the corrections that Sanderus suggested. Hondius was so thoroughly tired of the situation that he sold the Flandria Illustrata to its competitor brothers Blaeu without even notifying Sanderus nor Johannes D'Hondt. Meanwhile the publication already advanced fairly well. Although the publication was initially planned for Easter 1637, it would take almost four more years until the first volume appeared on April the first 1641.

== Third volume ==
Sanderus also prepared a third volume containing a description of French Flanders, Tournai and the Tournaisis that was titled; Icones Urbium, Villarum, Castellorum et Coenobiorum Gallo-Flandriae, quae Tertia Pars est Flandriae illustratae. Although it was already prepared in detail, including the preparatory drawings for the maps and illustrations by Vedastus du Plouich, this volume was never published. The drawings by du Plouich survived and are kept in the manuscript department of the Royal Library of Belgium.
