= Lille Chamber of Accounts =

Accounting department in the County of Flanders

The Chamber of Accounts in Lille (French: Chambre des comptes de Lille) was founded by Philip the Bold on 15 February 1386 to audit the accounts of his functionaries in the county of Flanders. As Burgundian rule expanded in the Low Countries, similar chambers were founded in Brussels and The Hague. The Lille chamber ultimately oversaw government expenditure not only in the county of Flanders, but also in the county of Artois, county of Hainaut, marquisate of Namur, the Franche Comté, and the lordship of Mechelen in the Burgundian Netherlands, and later among the Seventeen Provinces of the Habsburg Netherlands.

In 1667 the chamber was transferred to Bruges as a consequence of the French seizure of Lille. Louis XIV instead established a Bureau des Finances to oversee the accounts of functionaries in the pays conquis of Walloon Flanders, Artois, and the Cambrésis.

== Bibliography ==
- Inventaire analytique et chronologique des Archives de la Chambre des Comptes à Lille, 2 vols. (Paris, 1865)
- Alain Derville (ed.), Enquêtes fiscales de la Flandre wallonne, 3 vols. (Lille, 1983–2003)
- Mireille Jean, La chambre des comptes de Lille, 1477-1667 (Paris, 1992)
- J.-B. Santamaria, La Chambre des comptes de Lille de 1386 à 1419 (Turnhout, 2012)
- Anne Vandenbulcke, Répertoire des officiers des Chambres des comptes de Lille, Bruxelles et Ruremonde (XVIIe s.) (Brussels, 1998)
