= Amé Bourdon =

French physician and anatomist

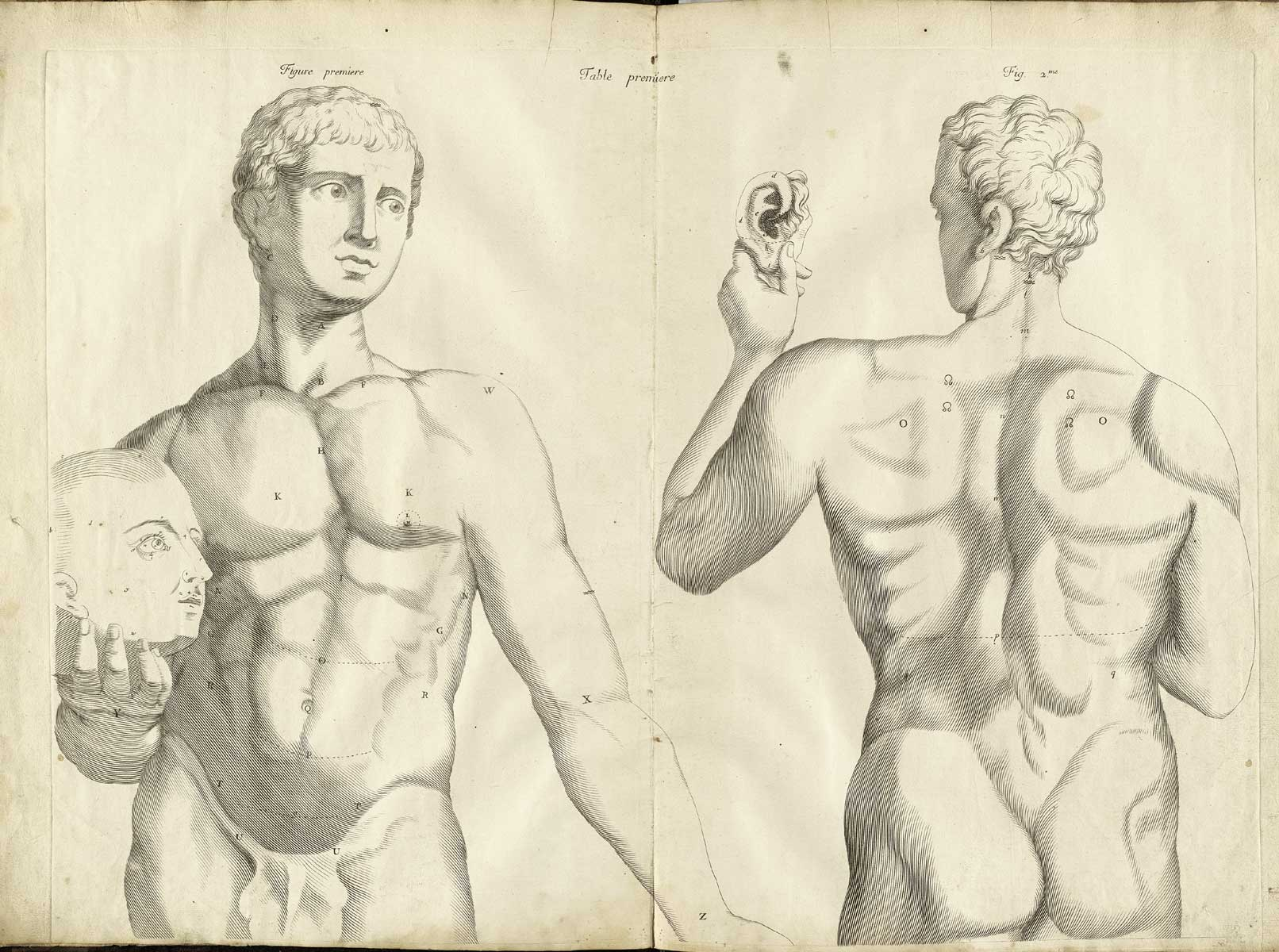
Amé Bourdon's Nouvelles tables anatomiques (Cambrai & Paris, 1678)

Amé Bourdon (1636 or 1638 – December 21, 1706) was a French physician and anatomist.

== Personal life ==
Bourdon was born in Cambrai, France, in 1636 or 1638, the son of an engineer in the service of the Spanish Crown. Having studied science extensively, he decided to attend the university in Douai at the age of 37. He practiced as a physician in Cambrai for much of his life, and died on December 21, 1706. Little else is known of him.

== Works ==
In 1678, Amé Bourdon published his double folio anatomical plates, Nouvelles tables anatomiques, most likely through the assistance of his patron Jacques Theodore de Brias, archevêque de Cambrai. The work consists of 16 individual plates, several of which can be combined to form complete human figures. The plates, which were drawn by Bourdon himself, were created using the etching needle and the burin on copperplate and are signed by the engraver Daniel Le Bossu (fl. 1671–1678). Some copies were hand colored and possibly illuminated by the publisher, as stated on the title page (plate [2]) and the entry for the work in the catalog of the Bibliothèque nationale de France.

The anatomical images were labeled with letters and then later described by a small 12mo work, Nouvelle description anatomique de toutes les parties du corps humain, & de leurs usages, which was published in Cambrai in 1679.
