= Jean Grenier =

French philosopher and writer (1898–1971)

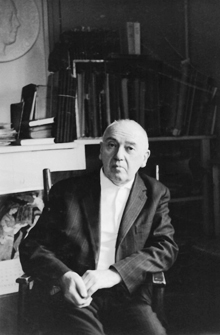
Grenier in 1964

Jean Grenier (French: [ʒɑ̃ ɡʁənje]; 6 February 1898 – 5 March 1971) was a French philosopher and writer. He taught for a time in Algiers, where he became a significant influence on the young Albert Camus.

== Biography ==
Born in Paris, Grenier spent his childhood and adolescence in Saint-Brieuc, Brittany, the birthplace of Jules Lequier, the visionary philosopher to whom Grenier would eventually dedicate his doctoral thesis. These early years, during which he became acquainted with Louis Guilloux, Edmond Lambert and Max Jacob, are documented in his autobiographical novel Les grèves (1957). In 1922 Grenier gained a teaching qualification in philosophy and began his academic career at the Institut français in Naples, alongside Henri Bosco. He then spent some time working on the literary journal La Nouvelle Revue française (NRF) before returning to teaching as a professor of philosophy in Algiers, the capital of Algeria. Albert Camus became a student of Grenier's and a close friendship developed between them. Strongly influenced by Les Îles, which came out in 1933, Camus dedicated his first book to Grenier: L'envers et l'endroit, published in Algeria by Edmond Charlot. His L'homme révolté was also dedicated to Grenier, and Camus provided the preface to the second edition of Les Îles in 1959.

However, the two thinkers followed very different ideological paths. While Camus was drawn to rebellion, despite his criticism of violent revolution in L'Homme revolte, and ultimately the desperate cries of La Chute, Grenier was more contemplative, adopting the Taoist principle of wu wei and surreptitiously practising a quietist version of Christianity.

Grenier's 1938 Essai sur l'esprit d'orthodoxie is essentially a distillation of his writings from 1936 and 1937. Although it tackles the burning issues of the day, it was intended to be "a reaction against them". This essay gave rise to a generation of intellectuals divided by their attitudes towards communism.

Grenier was well known in the intellectual circles of the time and contributed to numerous literary journals, including L'Œil, XXe Siècle and Preuves. A friend of Jean Paulhan, he frequently wrote for the NRF. Grenier had an arts column in the newspaper Combat while Camus was editor, and one in L'Express under Jean Daniel. Following a period of teaching in Alexandria and Cairo (where he met André Gide, Edmond Jabès, Jean Cocteau, Taha Hussein, Étiemble and Georges Perros) as well as teaching at the Faculty of Arts in Lille, Grenier held a chair in aesthetics and science of art at the Sorbonne from 1962 to 1968.

Grenier was particularly interested in the development of non-figurative art and wrote mainly on the subject of contemporary painting, including works such as: L'esprit de la peinture contemporaine, Essais sur la peinture contemporaine and Entretiens avec dix-sept peintres non-figuratifs. A summary of his reflections on the history of aesthetics, written for his students at the Sorbonne, may be found in L'art et ses problèmes.

Until his death in Vernouillet, Eure-et-Loir in 1971, Grenier regularly published works dealing with a wide range of philosophical questions, among them: Le choix, Entretiens sur le bon usage de la liberté, L'esprit du Tao and L'existence malheureuse. Somewhat more mundane topics included: Sur la mort d'un chien and La vie quotidienne. He filled notebooks with details of his relationships with Francine Camus, René Char, Louis Guilloux, Jean Giono, André Malraux and Manès Sperber and with the editorial team of the Nouvelle Nouvelle Revue française, as well as his conversations with numerous contemporary artists who visited him at his home in Bourg-la-Reine. Towards the end, he also wrote down some surprising definitions of technical terms and made some rather whimsical observations. In November 1968, just after the publication of Albert Camus – souvenirs, Grenier was awarded the Grand Prix national des lettres.

== Published works ==
- Interiora rerum, Grasset, Collection: Les Cahiers verts, 70, 1927
- Cum apparuerit, Collection: Terrasses de Lourmarin 19, Audin, 1930
- Les Îles, Collection: "Les Essais" n°7, Gallimard, 1933 Reprinted under the title: "L'imaginaire", 1977
- La philosophie de Jules Lequier, Vrin, 1936
- Santa Cruz et autres paysages africains, Collection: Méditerranéennes 4, Charlot, 1937
- Essai sur l'esprit d'orthodoxie, Gallimard, Les Essais n°5, 1938
- Le Choix, Presses Universitaires de France, 1941
- L’Existence, Gallimard, Collection: La Métaphysique, 1945
- Sextus Empiricus (translation) Aubier, 1948
- Entretiens sur le bon usage de la liberté, Paris, Gallimard, 1948
- L'esprit de la peinture contemporaine, Vineta, 1951
- Œuvres complètes de Jules Lequier (presentation), La Baconnière, 1952
- Lexique, Gallimard, Collection: Métamorphoses n°48, 1955
- A propos de l'humain, Gallimard, Collection: Les Essais n°74, 1955
- Les Grèves, Gallimard, 1957
- Sur la mort d'un chien, Gallimard, 1957
- L'esprit du Tao, Flammarion, 1957
- L'existence malheureuse, Gallimard, 1957
- Essais sur la peinture contemporaine, Gallimard, 1959
- Lanskoy, Hazan, Collection: Peintres d'aujourd'hui, 1960
- Absolu et choix, Presses Universitaires de France (Introduction to philosophy), 1961
- Borès, Verve, 1961
- Lettres d'Égypte followed by Un Été au Liban, Gallimard, 1962
- L'Imitation et les principes de l'esthétique classique, C.D.U.(The Sorbonne Lectures: Esthétique), 1963
- Entretiens avec dix-sept peintres non figuratifs, Calmann-Lévy, 1963, Reprinted by Editions Folle Avoine, 1990
- Vicissitudes de l'esthétique et révolution du goût, C.D.U.(The Sorbonne Lectures: Esthétique), 1965
- Célébration du miroir, Robert Morel, 1965
- La vie quotidienne, Gallimard, 1968
- Jules Lequier – La dernière page, Illustrated by Ubac, Gaston Puel, 1968
- Albert Camus – Souvenirs, Gallimard, 1968
- Senancour: les plus belles pages (presentation), Mercure de France, 1968
- Lexique, illustrated by Hadju, Fata Morgana, 1969
- Entretiens avec Louis Foucher, Gallimard, 1969
- Quatre prières, illustrated Madeleine Grenier, Gaston Puel, 1970
- L'art et ses problèmes, Éditions Rencontres, 1970
- Quatre prières, Illustrated by Madeleine Grenier, Gaston Puel, 1970
- Music, Le Musée de Poche, 1970
- Molinos: le guide spirituel (presentation), Fayard, 1970
- Mémoires intimes de X, Robert Morel, 1971
- Voir Naples, Gallimard, 1973
- Les poèmes brûlés, Nane Stern, 1973
- Réflexions sur quelques écrivains, Gallimard, 1973
- Jacques, Calligrammes, 1979
- Portrait de Jean Giono, Robert Morel, 1979
- Miroirs, illustrated by Arpad Szenes, Fata Morgana, 1980
- Jean Grenier – Georges Perros : correspondence 1950–1971, Calligrammes, 1980
- Correspondence avec Albert Camus (1932–1960), Gallimard, 1981
- Écrire et publier, Calligrammes, 1982
- Vie de Saint-Gens, followed by images by Saint-Gens par André de Richaud, Calligrammes, 1983
- Prières, illustrated by Zoran Music, Fata Morgana, 1983
- Le chant du voleur d'amour by Bilhana (presentation), Calligrammes, 1983
- Écrits sur le quiétisme, Calligrammes, 1984
- Jean Grenier – Jean Paulhan : correspondence 1925–1968, Calligrammes, 1984
- Premier voyage en Italie – 1921, Calligrammes, 1986
- Ombre et lumière, illustrated by Pierre Tal Coat, Fata Morgana, 1986
- Mes candidatures à la Sorbonne, Calligrammes, 1987
- Les A-peu-près, Ramsay, 1987
- La dernière page, preface by Jean Clair, Ramsay, 1987
- Mes candidatures à la Sorbonne, Calligrammes, 1987
- Jean Grenier – René Etiemble : correspondence 1945–1971, Folle Avoine, 1988
- Carnets 1944 – 1971, collection "Pour Mémoire", Seghers, 1991 (reprinted by les Éditions Claire Paulhan, 1999)
- Sur l’Inde, foreword by Olivier Germain-Thomas, Fata Morgana, 1994
- Sous l'occupation, Editions Claire Paulhan, 1997
