= Gaspard Thémistocle Lestiboudois =

French naturalist and botanist (1797–1876)

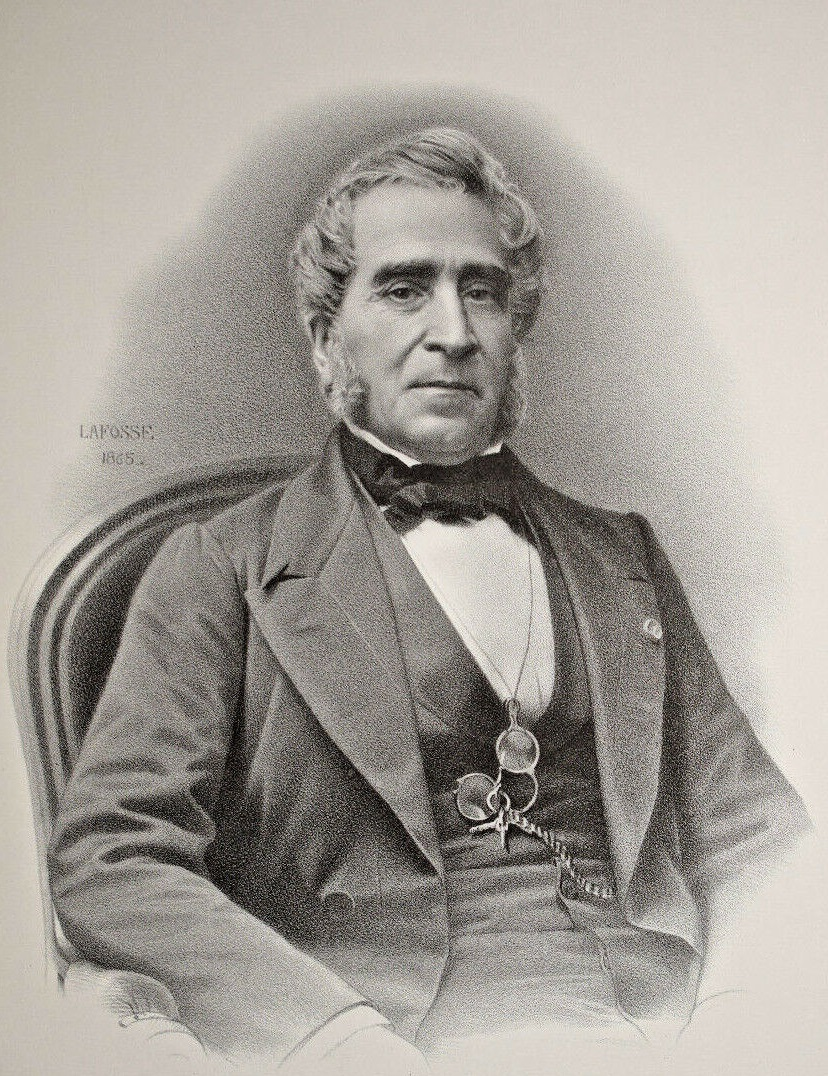
- Portrait of Lestiboudois after a photograph by Pierre Petit
- Born: 12 November 1797; Lille, France
- Died: 22 November 1876 (aged 79); Paris, France
- Scientific career
- Fields: Natural history
- Thesis: Phyllotaxie anatomique, ou recherches sur les causes organiques des diverses distributions des feuilles (1848)

Gaspard Thémistocle Lestiboudois (12 October 1797, Lille – 22 November 1876, Paris) was a French naturalist. He was the son of botanist François Joseph Lestiboudois (1759-1815) and the grandson of Jean-Baptiste Lestiboudois (1715-1804), a professor of botany at the Faculty of Lille.

In 1818, he obtained his doctorate of medicine in Paris. In 1835 he conducted research of the plague in Algeria. As a passenger on a train, he was involved in a terrible accident at Rœux; despite being injured, he attended to the wounds of other victims.

In August 1868 he was chosen commander of the Legion of Honour.

== Written works ==
Known for his early investigations of phyllotaxis, in 1848 he published Phyllotaxie anatomique. Other noted works by Lestiboudois include:

- Essai sur la famille des Cypéracées, 1819 - Essay on the family Cyperaceae.
- Études sur l'anatomie et la physiologie des végétaux, Paris : Treuttel et Wurtz, 1840 - Studies on the anatomy and physiology of plants.
- Économie pratique des nations, ou Système économique applicable aux différentes contrées, et spécialement à la France, 1847
- Voyage en Algérie, ou Études sur la colonisation de l'Afrique française, 1853 - Voyage to Algeria; studies on the colonization of French Africa.
