= Willem Hessels van Est =

Dutch Catholic commentator on the Pauline epistles

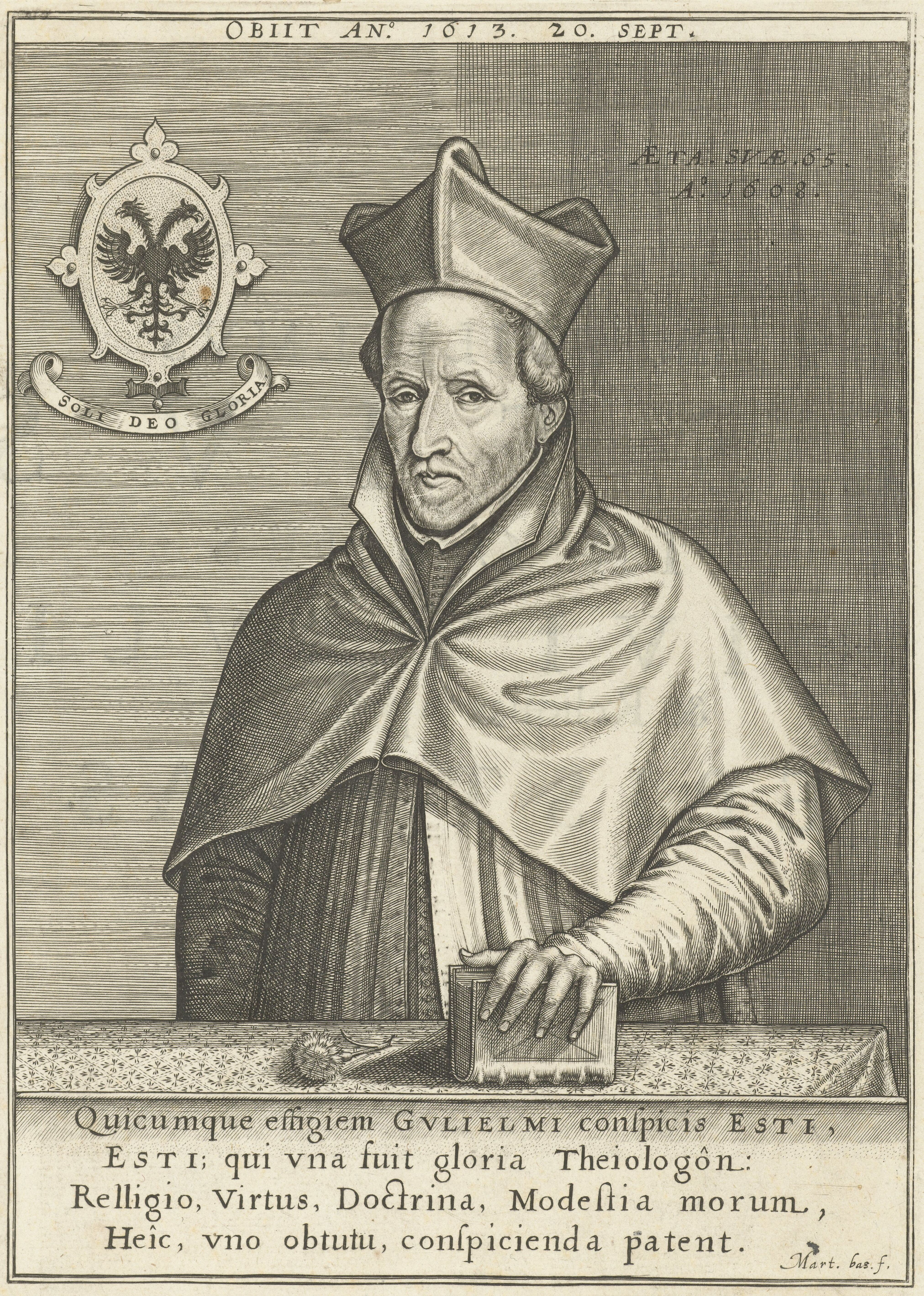
- Born: 1542; Gorinchem
- Died: 20 September 1613; Douai
- Occupation: Theologian

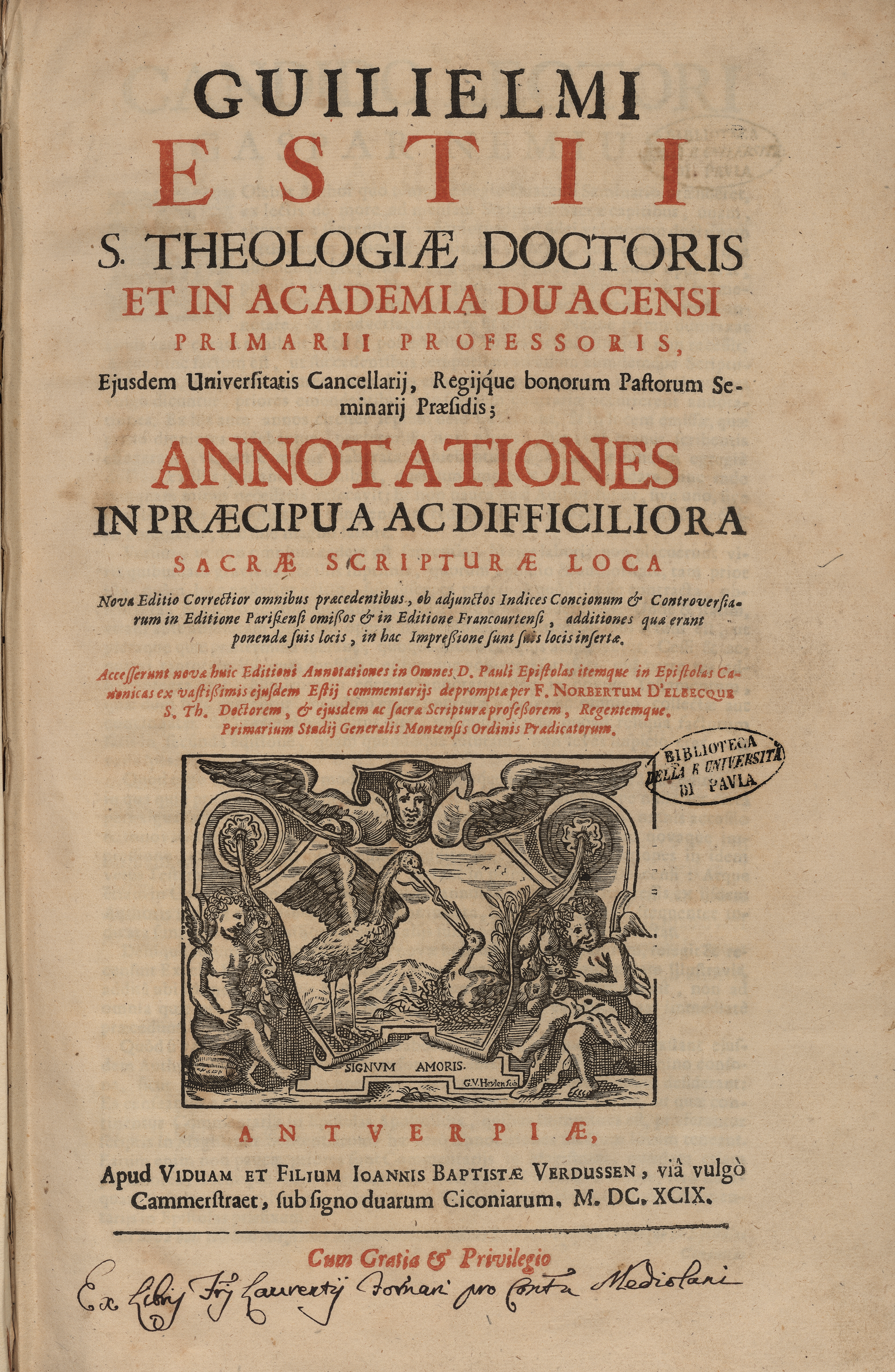
Annotationes in praecipua ac difficiliora Sacrae Scripturae loca, 1699

Willem Hessels van Est, Latinized as Estius (1542 – 20 September 1613), was a Dutch Catholic commentator on the Pauline epistles.

== Biography ==
He was born at Gorcum, County of Holland.

He received his early education at home, after which he went to Utrecht, where he studied classics and thence proceeded to Leuven, where he spent about twenty years in the study of philosophy, theology and Holy Scripture. During the last ten years there he was professor of philosophy in one of the colleges. In 1580 he received the degree of Doctor of Theology.

During this time he was frequently the bearer of pecuniary aid to his uncle, Nicolas Pieck, who was giving missions in present Belgium; but the latter would never accept any help. In 1572, while Est was still at Leuven, his native town was captured by the Calvinists. His father, brother and uncle were made prisoners. The father and brother escaped, but Nicolas Pieck, who was then Superior of the Franciscan convent at Gorcum, and eighteen other ecclesiastics, were taken to Den Briel, on the North sea-coast, and put to death. Est wrote what is considered the best history of these Martyrs of Gorcum, who were canonized by Pius IX in 1867.

When Est first arrived at Leuven he found the place in a ferment owing to the recently broached opinions of Michel Baius, one of the professors of Holy Scripture, who held a leading position in the university all the time that Est was there; violent controversy raged around the person of Baius during all that time. It is evident from the commentaries of Est that he was much influenced on questions of divine grace and free will by the teaching of his old professor, Baius; and on these points he has to be read with some caution. After having been made doctor, he continued teaching philosophy at Leuven two years longer. In 1582 he was made professor of theology at Douai, a position which he retained for thirty-one years. He was also for many years rector of the diocesan seminary and during the last eighteen years of his life chancellor of the University of Douai.

Soon after he left Leuven, a fresh controversy broke out there, into which he appears to have been drawn. About 1586 Leonardus Lessius began to refute the errors of Baius in his ordinary course of lectures. The friends of Baius, who admired him for his edifying life, great learning and manly submission, felt annoyed that his shortcomings should have been thus pointedly accentuated by their opponents. They attacked certain propositions of Lessius, resembling those of Molina and Suarez, and had them condemned by the university as savouring of Semipelagianism. The sister university of Douai added its condemnation (said to have been obtained under a misapprehension), and its terms were in still more violent language. It has been said, though on no very clear evidence, that the form of condemnation was drawn up by Est. There can be little doubt that but he was in favour of the condemnation. The whole controversy finally led up to the Congregatio de Auxiliis (a papal commission).

He died in Douai in 1613.

Pope Benedict XIV gave Est the scholastic accolade "doctor fundatissimus". The 1913 Catholic Encyclopedia praises his "piety, modesty and compassion [...] learning, solid judgement and eloquence".

== Writings ==
Most of Est's works, which were written in Latin, were not published until after his death. His greatest work is his In omnes Divi Pauli et Catholicas Epistolas Commentarii (1614–15).

His other works are:

- Historia Martyrum Gorcomiensium (1603)
- Waerachtighe historie van de martelaers van Gorcom (Antwerpen, 1604), Dutch translation of Historia Martyrum Gorcomiensium available at KU Leuven Special Collections
- Commentarii in IV libros Sententiarum Petri Lombardi (1615)
- Annotationes in praecipua et difficiliora S. Scripturae loca (1617)
- Orationes theologicæ (Paris, Quesnel, Jacques, 1654) available at KU Leuven Special Collections

He also translated the life of Edmund Campion, from French into Latin, and left copious notes for a new edition of the works of Augustine of Hippo.
