= Thomas Hoy (botanist) =

English gardener and botanist (c.1750–1822)

Thomas Hoy (c.1750 – 1 May 1822) was an English gardener and botanist employed by the Dukes of Northumberland at Syon House in Middlesex for 40 years. Described as "an experienced botanist and able cultivator", he was a fellow of the Linnean Society of London and one of the first fellows named in the 1809 royal charter of the Horticultural Society of London. Several plant species were first formally described from plants he grew at Syon, and Robert Brown named the plant genus Hoya in his honour.

== Career at Syon ==
Hoy's weather records place him in the London area from 1771, at Barn Elms, Kennington and Muswell Hill, and at Syon House from July 1782. Syon, the Middlesex seat of the Dukes of Northumberland on the River Thames opposite Kew, had a large collection of exotic plants. Hoy served three successive dukes there; his memorial described him as "forty years gardener to three noble Dukes of Northumberland". John Claudius Loudon recorded in 1825 that the grounds, laid out by Capability Brown, had been "lately under the care of Hoy, F.L.S."

In 1785 the Society for the Encouragement of Arts, Manufactures, and Commerce distributed seed of Chinese hemp and flax obtained through the East India Company, and the Duke directed that some be grown in his gardens. Hoy raised the seed on a hotbed, under glass without bottom heat, and in open ground, and reported the results in a letter from Sion House dated 9 December 1785, which the society published in its Transactions.

His skill as a cultivator was noticed in print. In 1788 Curtis's Botanical Magazine described his method of growing Calceolaria pinnata from cuttings in a heated stove so that it flowered all year, adding that at Syon "this plant may be seen in great perfection". Henry Charles Andrews figured a Banksia spinulosa from the Duke's collection at Syon, "where, under the care of Mr. Hoy, several fine species of this genus are in very great perfection".

== Linnean Society ==
Hoy became a fellow of the Linnean Society in 1788, the year of its foundation, and was one of 36 fellows on the society's list of 1790. He brought plants grown at Syon to the society's meetings: in 1790 he showed Mimosa myrtifolia (now Acacia myrtifolia) in flower, raised from some of the first seed sent to England from New South Wales, and on 4 December 1792 he presented Goodenia ovata in flower. From such plants James Edward Smith formally described several new species, including the Australian plants Acacia suaveolens, Acacia myrtifolia (both originally published in Mimosa) and Goodenia ovata, and Statice latifolia (now Limonium latifolium). Smith also described Ipomopsis inconspicua in his Exotic Botany from a plant "raised in 1793, by Mr. Thomas Hoy, F.L.S. at Sion House". Specimens he supplied from Syon, labelled "Sion Gardens, Mr. Hoy", are preserved in Smith's herbarium at the Linnean Society, among them a sheet of Helenium longifolium, a species Smith later described.

Hoy served on the society's council from 1807 to 1808, and he remained active in it in later life; one of its founders, Samuel Goodenough, noted his presence at the anniversary meeting of 1812.

== Kew and the Horticultural Society ==
The second edition of Hortus Kewensis, published from 1810 to 1813 as the catalogue of plants at Kew, credits "Mr. Thomas Hoy" with introducing or cultivating six plants, including Banksia robur (1802), Begonia dichotoma (1800), Ipomopsis inconspicua (1793) and the two acacias. In 1809 he was named in the royal charter of the Horticultural Society of London as one of its first fellows and members of its first council, one of three men listed in the charter as gardeners.

== Weather observations ==
Hoy also kept a weather diary recording pressure, temperature, rainfall and wind direction, usually twice a day. His observations were made at Barn Elms, Kennington and Muswell Hill from 1771 and at Syon House from July 1782 to March 1822; the volumes, which also contain observations made in Scotland by his brother J. Hoy, are held by the Met Office archive. His Syon House barometer readings from the early 1780s have been used in reconstructions of the long London daily pressure record. His brother James, who kept the Scottish observations, was in the service of the Duke of Gordon at Gordon Castle; Sir Thomas Frankland, writing to Smith in 1820, called him "brother to Hoy, the Sion Gardener".

== Death and legacy ==
Hoy died at Isleworth on 1 May 1822, aged 72. His headstone there, recorded in 1840, described him as "40 years gardener to the Duke of Northumberland".

Robert Brown named the genus Hoya in 1810, describing Hoy as someone "whose merits as an intelligent and successful cultivator have been long known to the botanists of this country". The genus's type species, Hoya carnosa, had been introduced to Kew from China by Joseph Banks in 1802; no contemporary source connects Hoy with the plant itself. Noting the new genus in 1811, the Medical and Physical Journal called Hoy "an enthusiastic botanist, who, with proper encouragement, would do much for the promotion of the science". Writing in 1830, James Traill described him as "long known as a scientific and skilful cultivator in his capacity of Gardener to the Duke of Northumberland".
