= Phyllode =

Modified petioles or leaf stems

Phyllodes are modified petioles or leaf stalks, which are leaf-like in both appearance and function. In some plants, these become flattened and widened, while the leaf itself becomes reduced or vanishes altogether. Thus the phyllode comes to serve the purpose of the leaf. Some important examples are Euphorbia royleana which are cylindrical and Opuntia which are flattened.

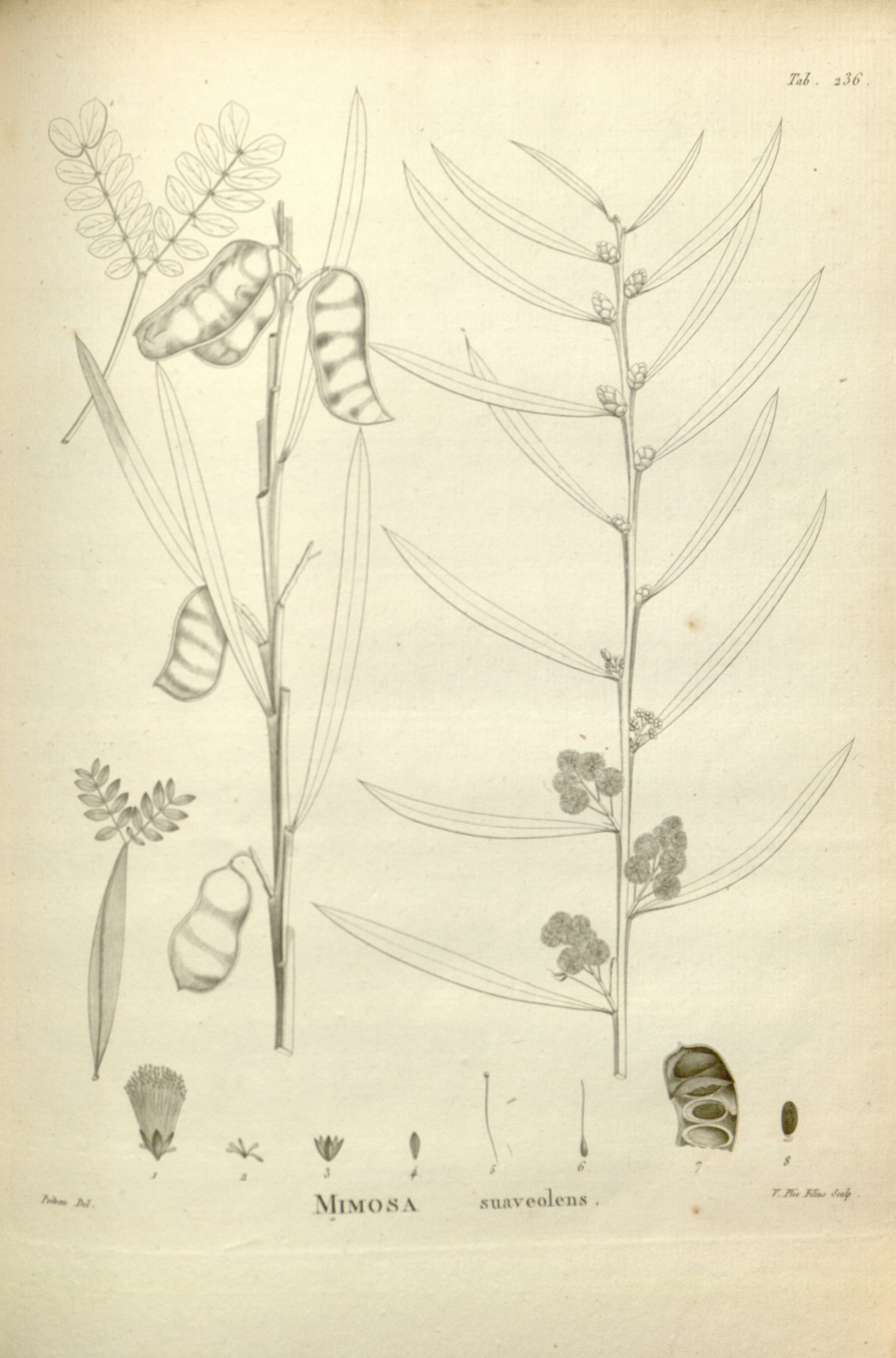
Acacia suaveolens (Sm.) Willd. [as Mimosa suaveolens Sm.] La Billardière (Labillardière), J.-J. Houton de, Novae Hollandiae plantarum specimen, vol. 2: p. 87, t. 236 (1804) (Poiteau)

They are common in the genus Acacia, especially the Australian species, at one time put in Acacia subg. Phyllodineae. Sometimes, especially on younger plants, partially formed phyllodes bearing reduced leaves can be seen. The illustration (to the right) of Acacia suaveolens from Novae Hollandiae plantarum specimen shows the juvenile true leaves, together with the developing phyllodes, and the phyllodes of the mature plant.

The genus, Daviesia, in the family Fabaceae, is characterised in part by the plants having phyllodes.

== Gallery ==
Phyllodes in Fabaceae

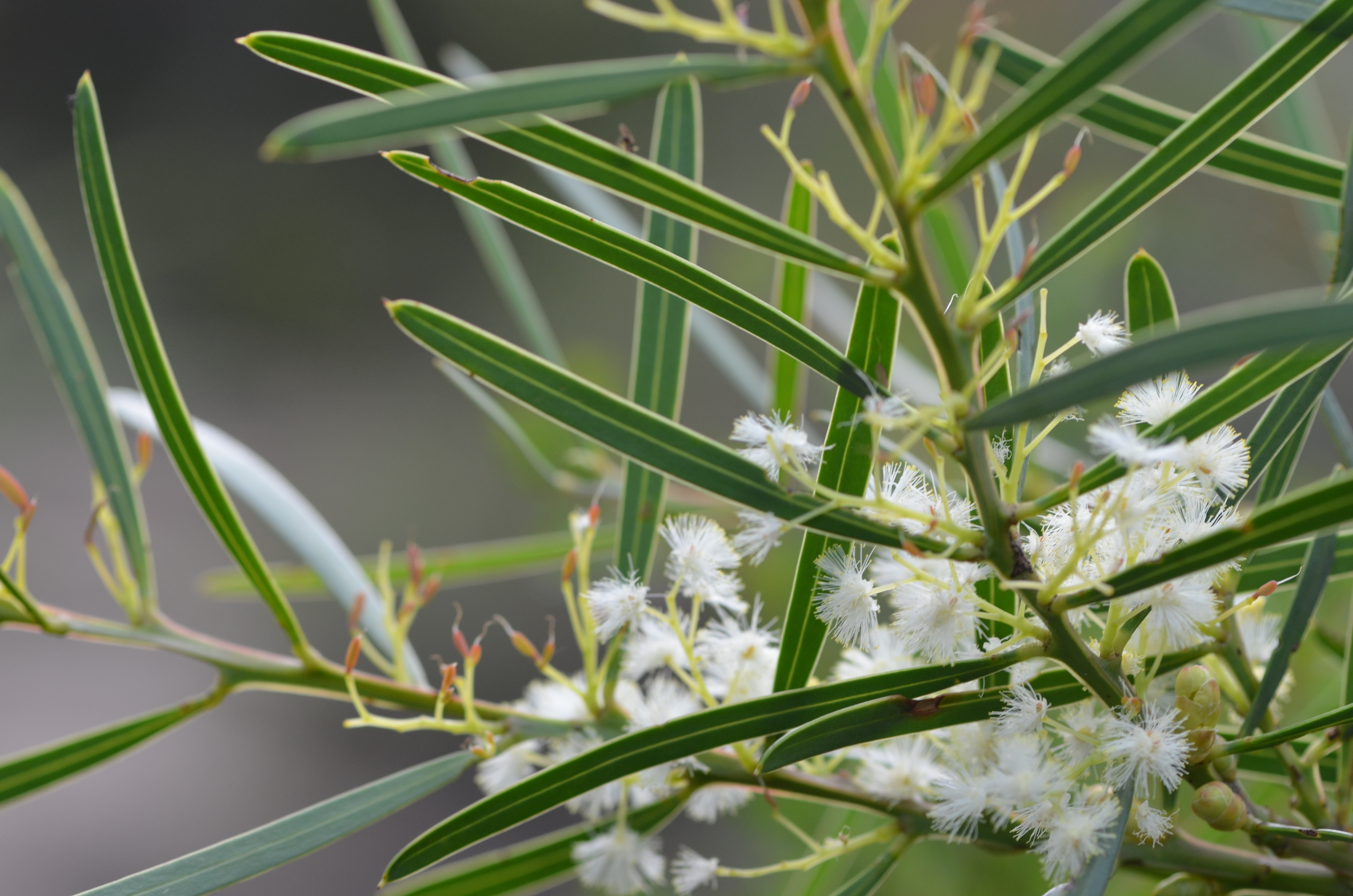
Acacia suaveolens

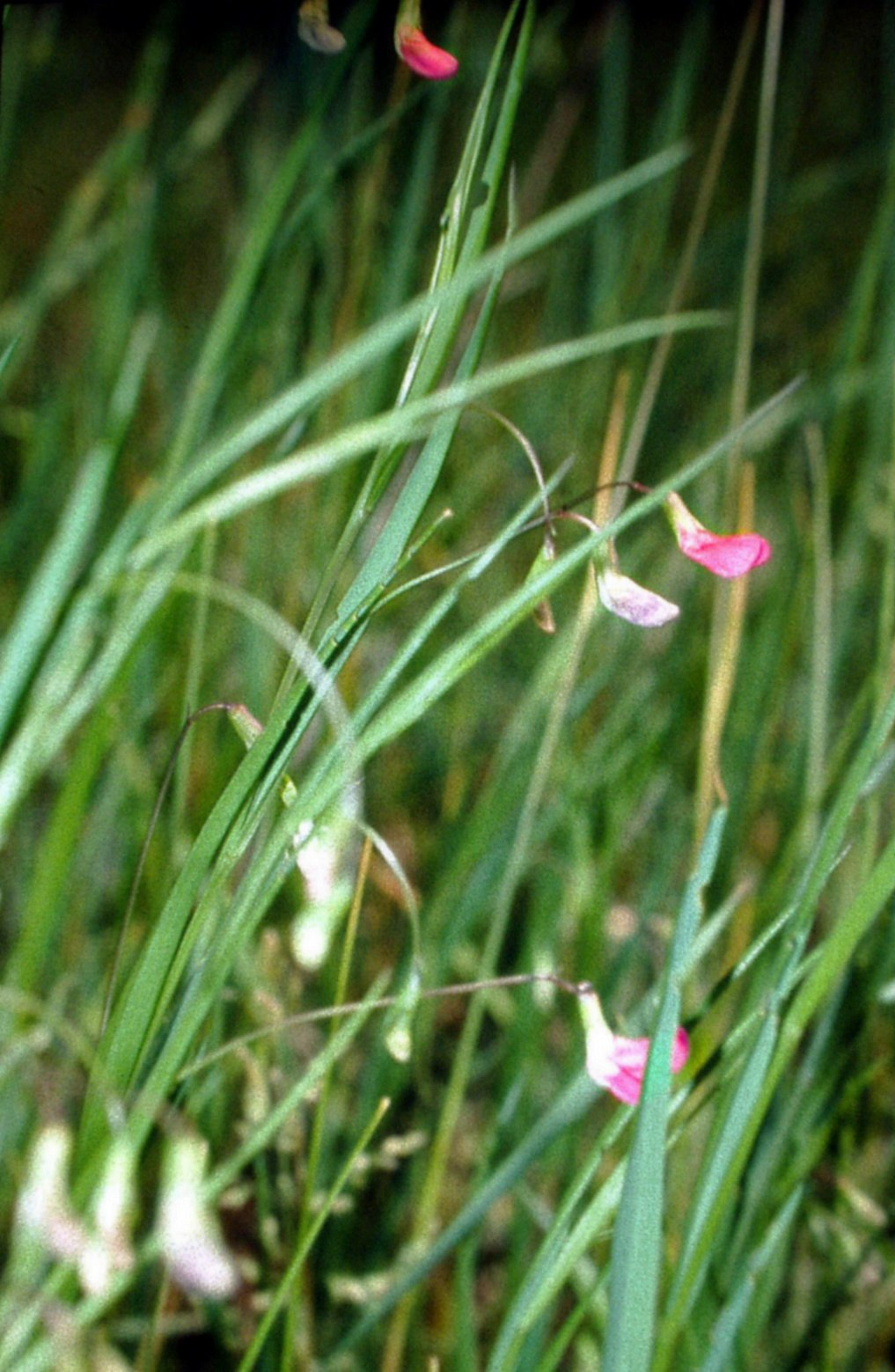
Lathyrus nissolia

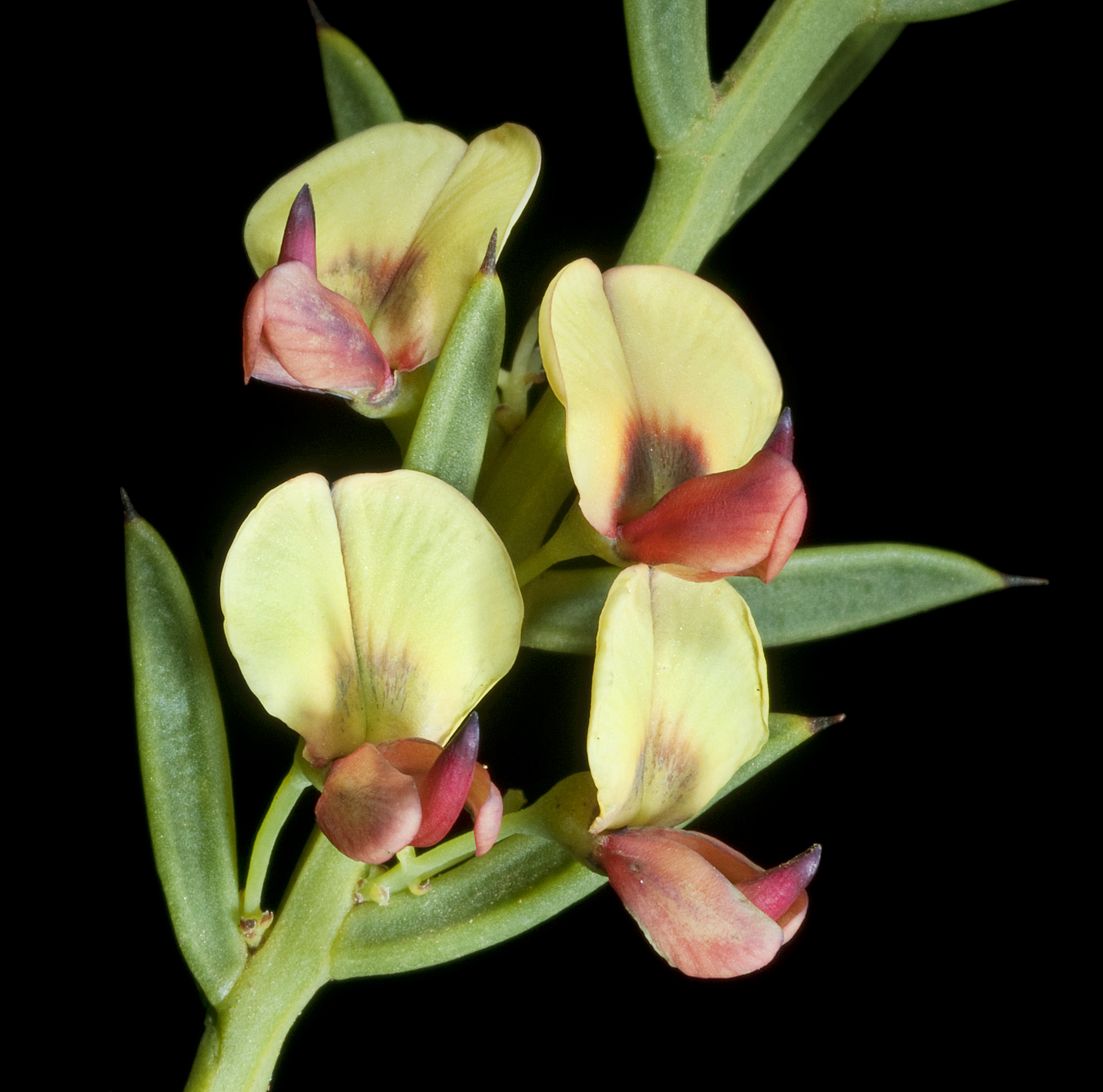
Daviesia angulata

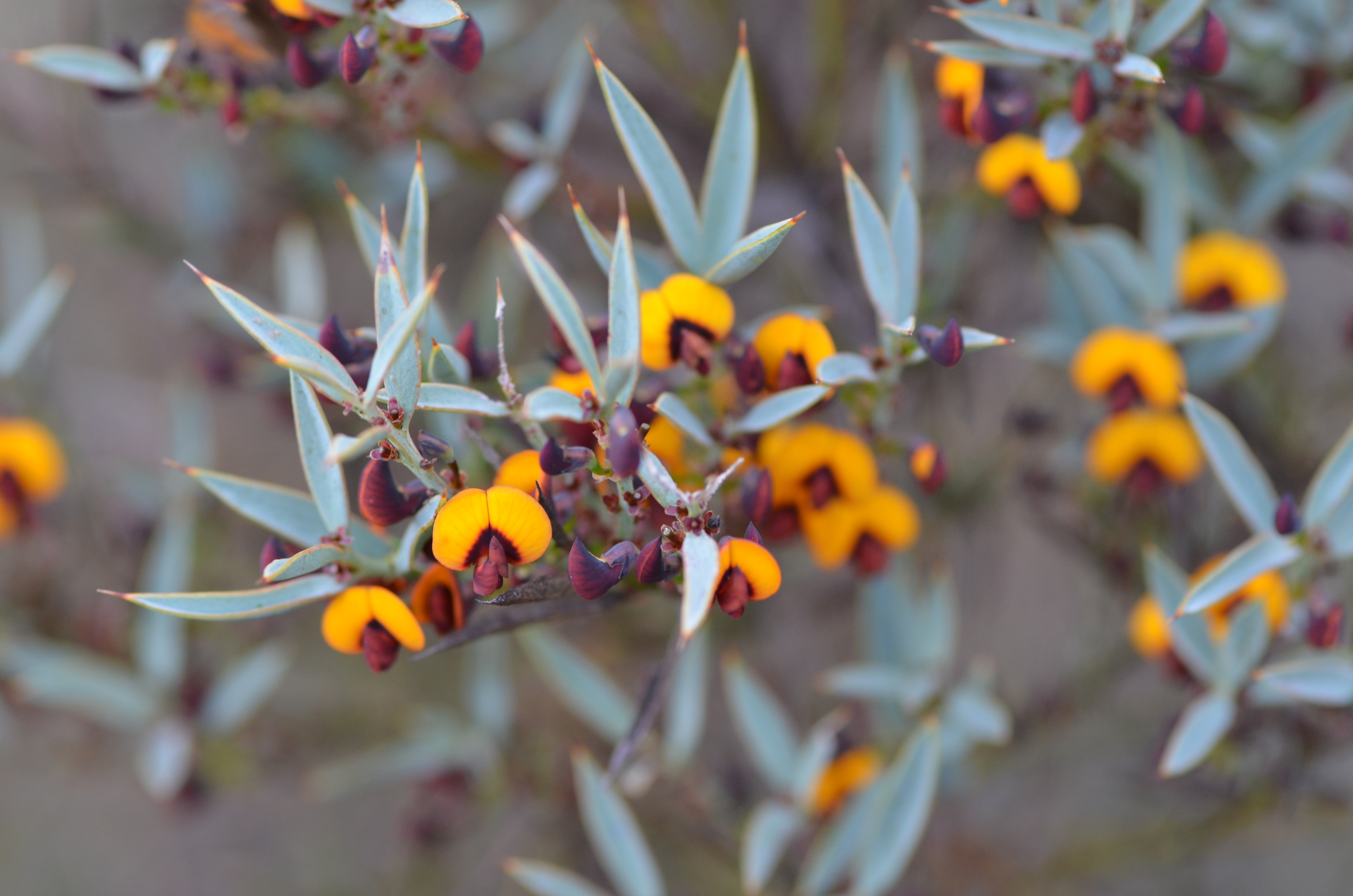
Daviesia nudiflora

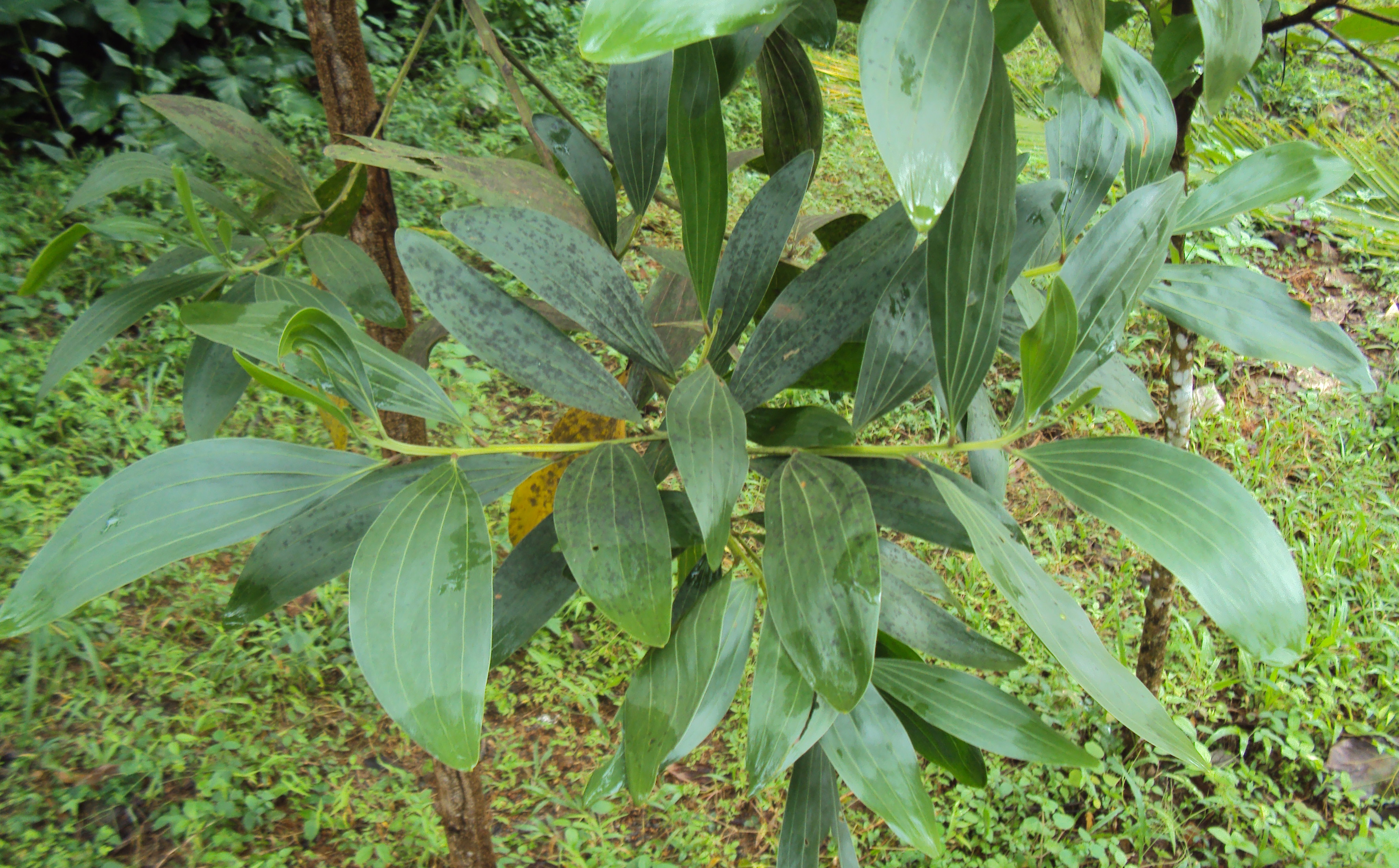
Acacia mangium

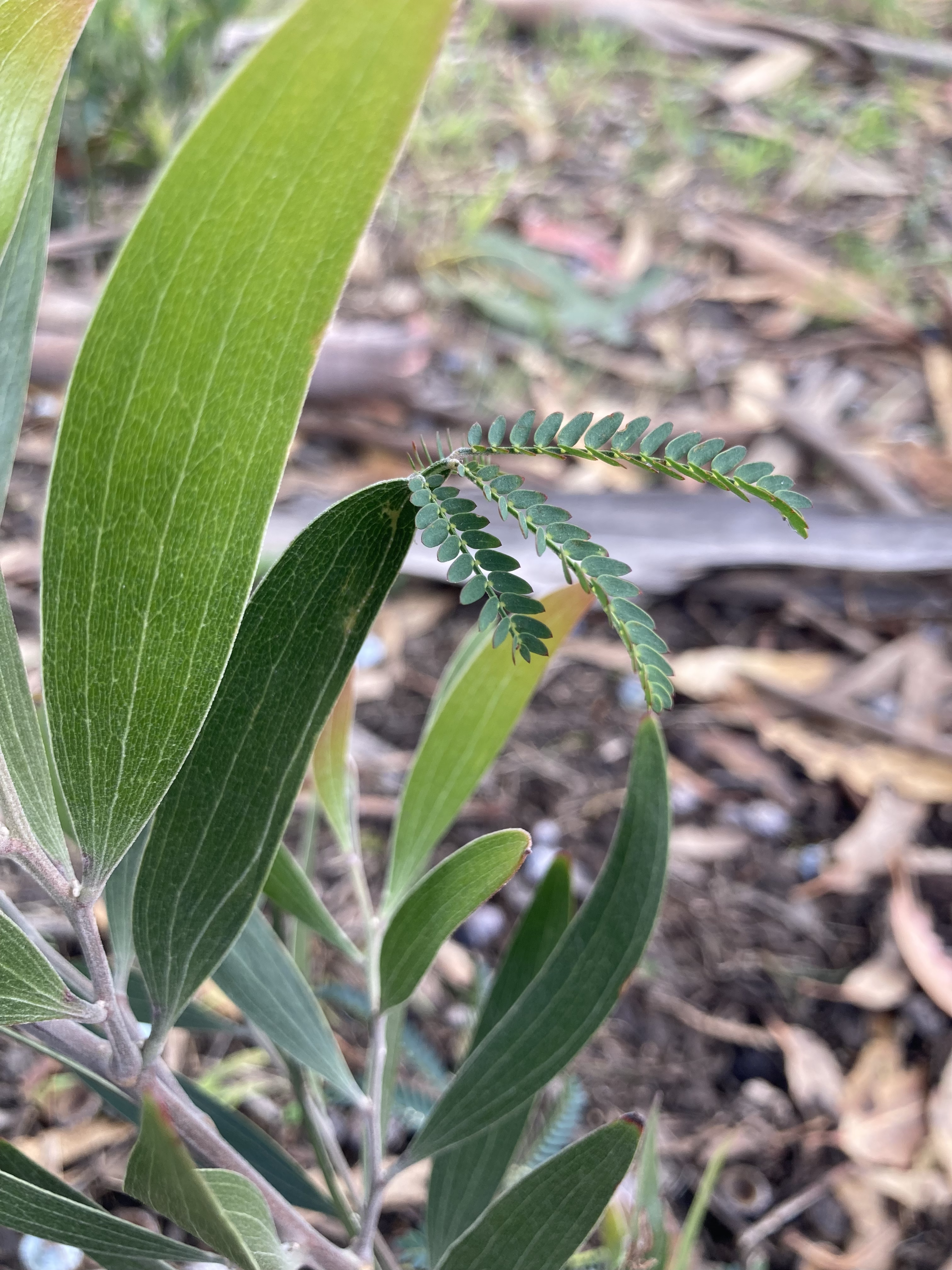
Blackwood Acacia phyllode and leaf on juvenile specimen.
