= Kalladikodan hills =

Kalladikodan hills are a range of hills immediately to the north of the Palghat Gap in Kerala, adjacent to the Tamil Nadu border.

Besides being a conspicuous landmark on the road route from Palakkad to Kozhikode, these hills are the source of numerous non-timber forest produce including Shilajit (called kanmadam—literally "stone-musk--in the local language), as well as numerous medicinal plants. In keeping with the rest of this section of the Western Ghats, these hills have a high degree of biodiversity.

Kalladikodan Hills are well-known for scenic beauty, and its waterfalls are a source of multiple rivers. Two prominent waterfalls are the Muthikulam waterfall and the Meenvallam waterfall.

From a sociological perspective, these hills are home to numerous elements of folklore dominated by several local divinities. Of these, the Kalladikodan Kari Neeli ("deep blue" Goddess) is a dominant figure in the Shakti school of Tantra and the mother of a host of chathans (minor divinities often portrayed as mischievous beings who could be controlled by adequately-trained human masters or shamans). The Kalladikodan hills have inspired numerous shaman-sorcerers and even a folk dance form called Neeliyattam. The lore of this ferocious goddess has also been captured in drama.
