= Limonium latifolium =

Limonium latifolium can refer to:

- Limonium latifolium Moench, a synonym of Goniolimon tataricum (L.) Boiss. subsp. tataricum
- Limonium latifolium (Sm.) Kuntze, a synonym of Limonium platyphyllum Lincz.
