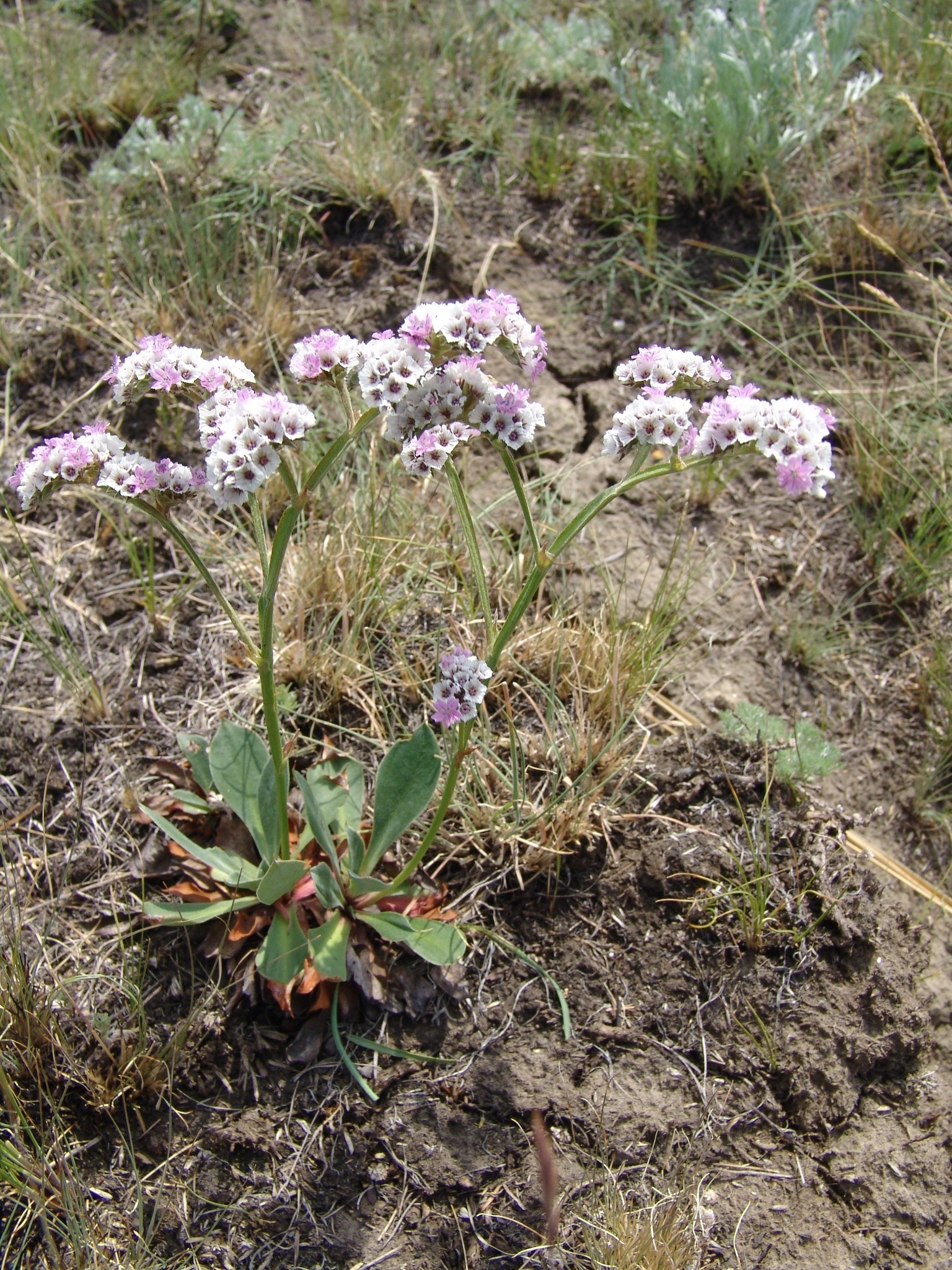
- Habit
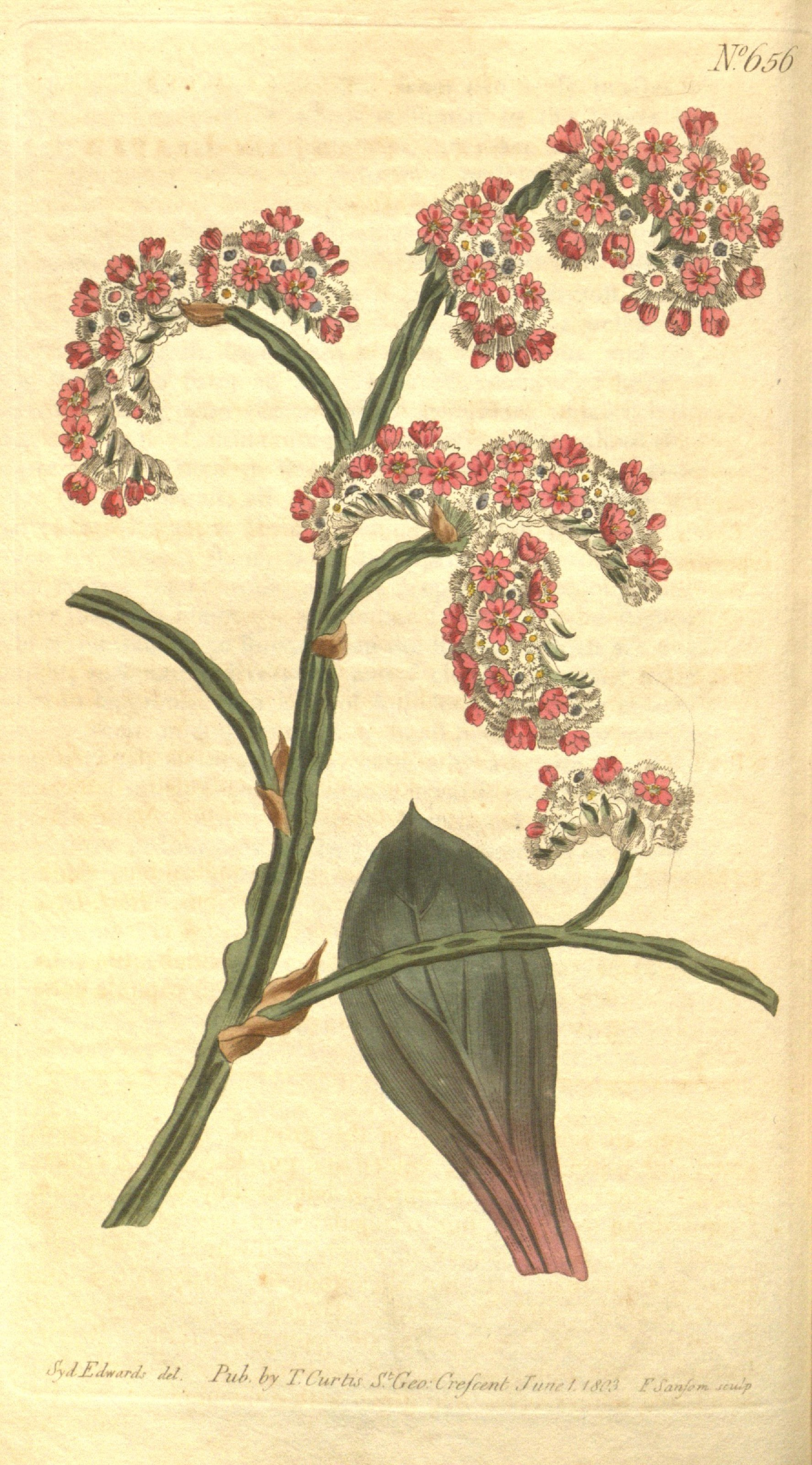
- Botanical illustration

Scientific classification
- Kingdom: Plantae
- Clade: Tracheophytes
- Clade: Angiosperms
- Clade: Eudicots
- Order: Caryophyllales
- Family: Plumbaginaceae
- Genus: Goniolimon
- Species: G. speciosum

Binomial name
- Goniolimon speciosum (L.) Boiss.

Synonyms
- List: Goniolimon crispum (Regel) Lipsch.; Goniolimon speciosum f. alpinum Herder; Goniolimon speciosum var. strictum (Regel) T.H.Peng; Goniolimon strictum (Regel) Lincz.; Limoniastrum speciosum (L.) Moench; Limonium ochranthum (Kar. & Kir.) Kuntze; Limonium speciosum (L.) Chaz.; Statice conspicua Sims; Statice ochrantha Kar. & Kir.; Statice speciosa L.; Statice speciosa var. crispa Regel; Statice speciosa var. lanceolata Regel; Statice speciosa var. stricta Regel; Taxanthema conspicuum (Sims) Sweet; Taxanthema speciosum (L.) Sweet

= Goniolimon speciosum =

Species of plant

Goniolimon speciosum, the dwarf statice (a name shared with other species) or plantain-leaved thrift, is a widespread species of flowering plant in the family Plumbaginaceae. It is native to the Eurasian steppes, southern and eastern Russia, Kazakhstan, Siberia, Mongolia, Inner Mongolia, and Xinjiang. Przewalski's horses (Equus przewalskii) regularly consume it.

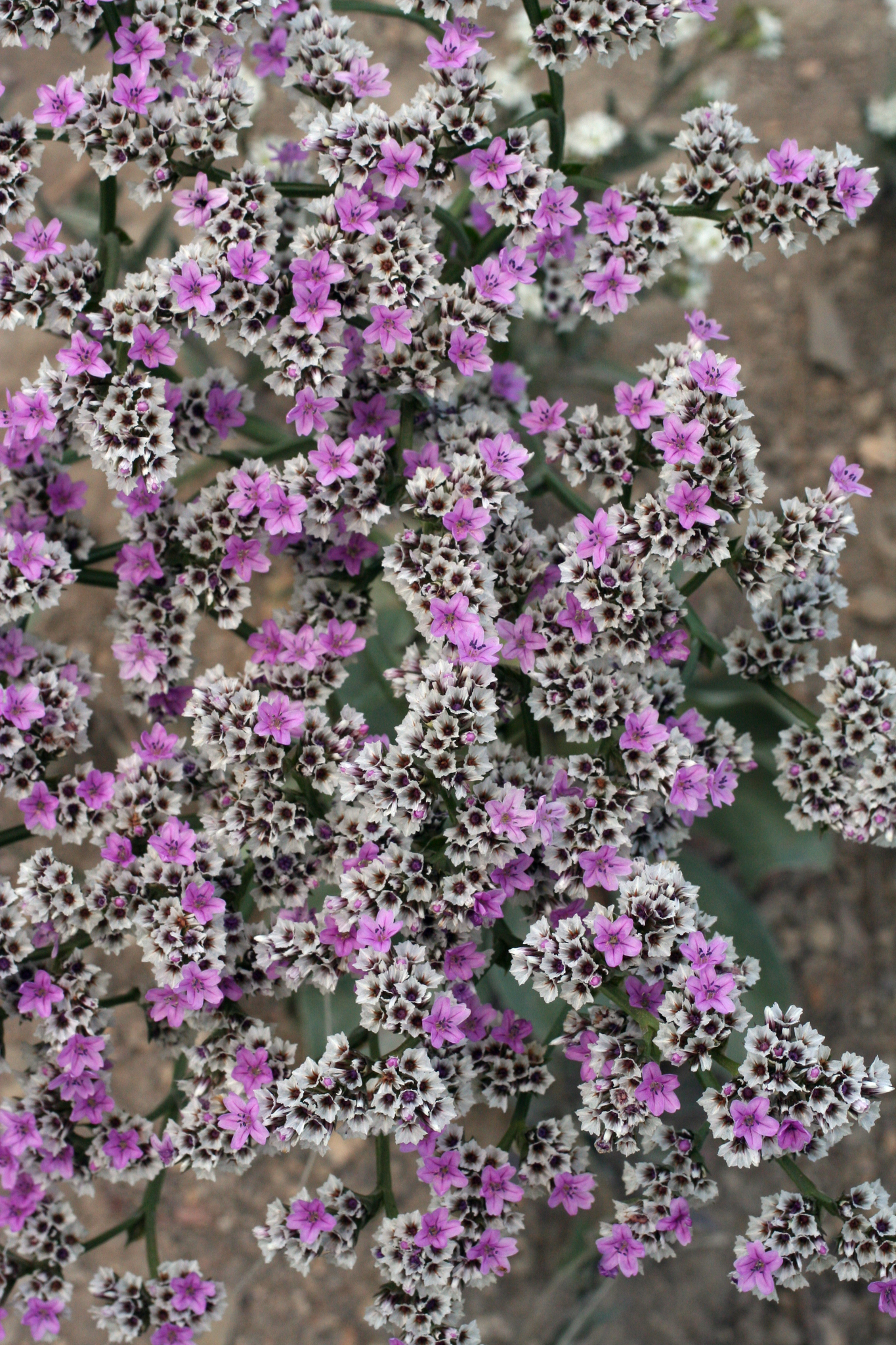
Close-up of flowers
