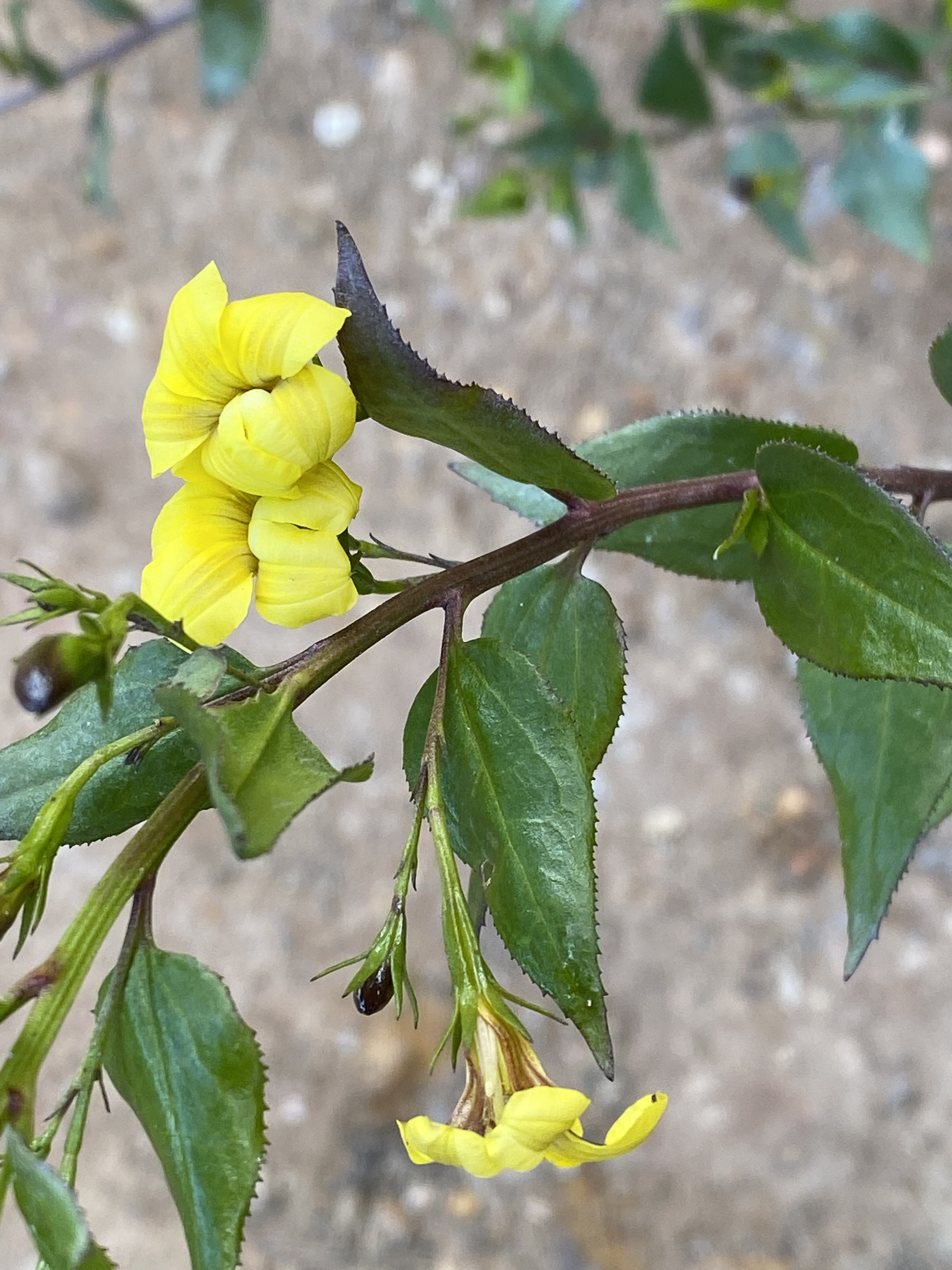

Scientific classification
- Kingdom: Plantae
- Clade: Tracheophytes
- Clade: Angiosperms
- Clade: Eudicots
- Clade: Asterids
- Order: Asterales
- Family: Goodeniaceae
- Genus: Goodenia
- Species: G. ovata

Binomial name
- Goodenia ovata Sm.

Synonyms
- Goodenia acuminata R.Br.; Goodenia ovata f. latifolia (Schltdl.) A.D.Chapm.; Goodenia ovata Sm. f. ovata; Goodenia ovata var. cordata F.Muell.; Goodenia ovata var. lanceolata F.Muell.; Goodenia ovata var. latifolia Schltdl.; Goodenia ovata Sm. var. ovata; Goodenoughia ovata (Sm.) Siebert & Voss

= Goodenia ovata =

Hop goodenia

Species of plant

Goodenia ovata, commonly called hop goodenia, is a species of flowering plant and is endemic to south-eastern Australia. It is a shrub with sticky, often varnished foliage, toothed egg-shaped to elliptic leaves and racemes or thyrses of yellow flowers.

== Description ==
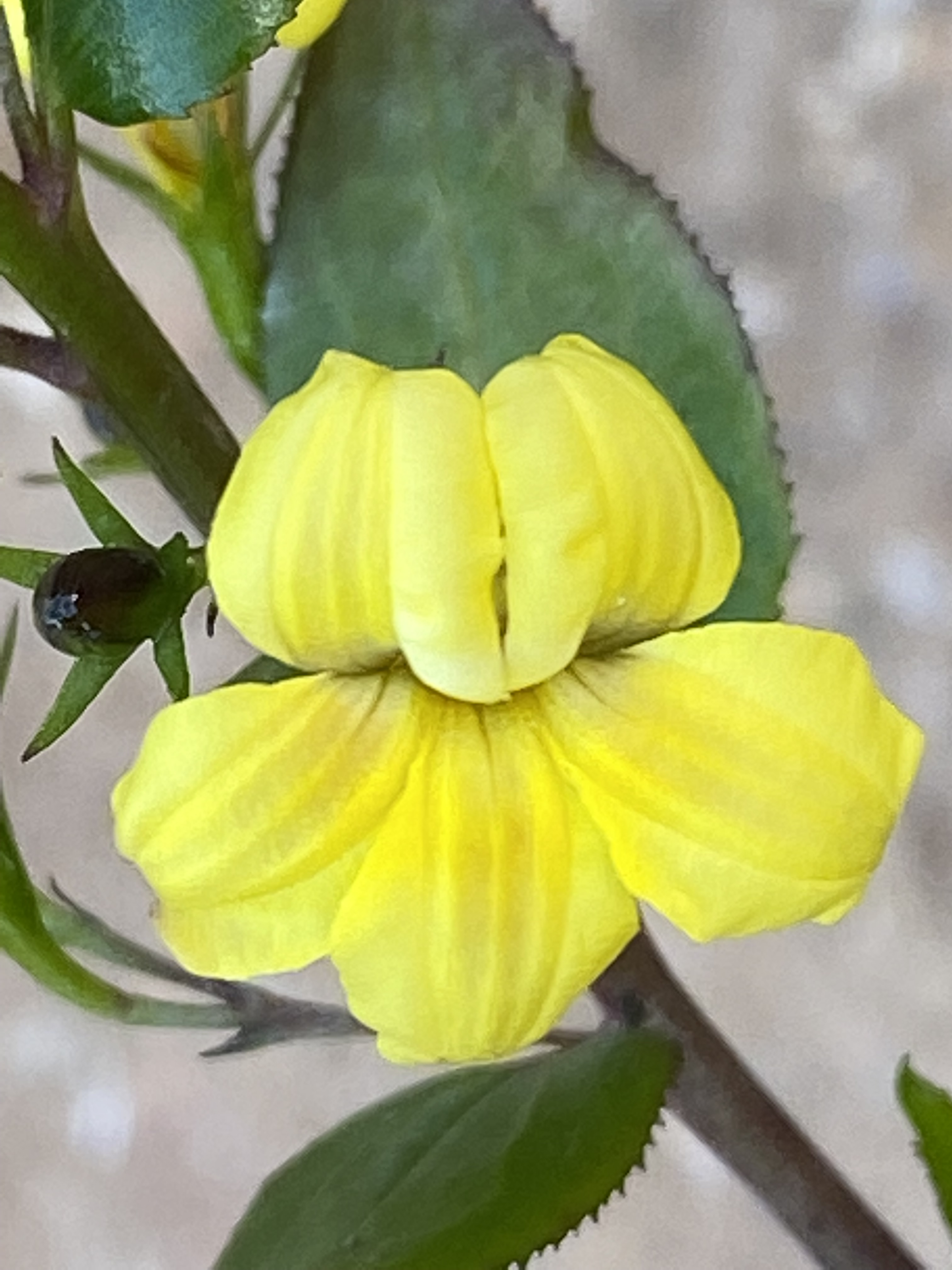
Flower closeup

Goodenia ovata is an erect, ascending to prostrate shrub that typically grows to a height of 2 m (6 ft 7 in) and has sticky, often varnished foliage. The leaves are egg-shaped to elliptic, 30–80 mm (1.2–3.1 in) long and 10–40 mm (0.39–1.57 in) wide with toothed edges, on a petiole up to 30 mm (1.2 in) long.

The flowers are arranged in racemes or thyrses about 350 mm (14 in) long on a peduncle 10–40 mm (0.39–1.57 in) long, with leaf-like bracts and linear bracteoles 2–6 mm (0.079–0.236 in) long. Each flower is borne on a pedicel up to 8 mm (0.31 in) long, the sepals linear to lance-shaped and 3–11 mm (0.12–0.43 in) long. The petals are yellow, 10–19 mm (0.39–0.75 in) long, the lower lobes 5–7 mm (0.20–0.28 in) long with wings up to 2.5 mm (0.098 in) wide. Flowering occurs throughout the year with a peak from October to March and the fruit is a cylindrical capsule 8–12 mm (0.31–0.47 in) long.

== Taxonomy ==
Goodenia ovata was first formally described in 1794 by James Edward Smith in Transactions of the Linnean Society of London from specimens "presented to the Society by Mr. Hoy" in December 1792. The species' name ovata refers to the egg-shaped or oval leaves.

== Distribution and habitat ==
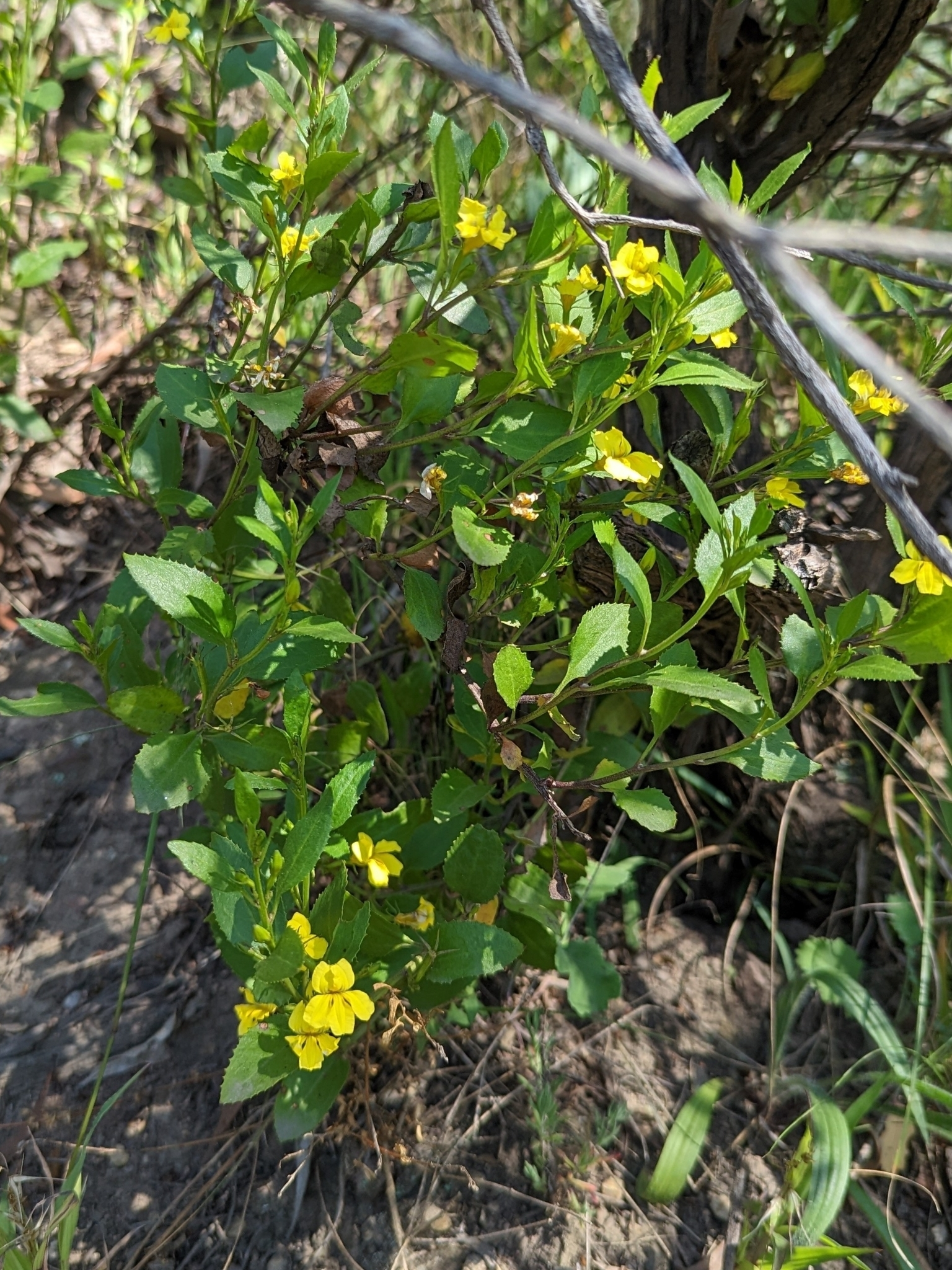
Growth habitat

Hop goodenia grows in forest, woodland and scrub in higher rainfall areas, and especially in disturbed areas. It is found near the coast as well as in drier inland areas. It occurs in south-eastern South Australia, most of Victoria apart from the northern mallee and alpine areas and most of New South Wales. It is also widespread in Tasmania and south-eastern Queensland.

It grows on medium-nutrient clay soils derived from shale, as well as siltstone and sandstone, in areas of good drainage in a partly-shaded location in moist eucalypt forests alongside Themeda australis and under such trees as turpentine (Syncarpia glomulifera) or blackbutt (Eucalyptus pilularis), or in open forest under swamp oak (Casuarina glauca), forest red gum (Eucalyptus tereticornis), thin-leaved stringybark (E. eugenioides), or woollybutt (E. longifolia).

== Ecology ==
The flowers of G. ovata are pollinated by insects, including native bees, honeybees, and hoverflies. The plant is killed by bushfire and regenerates from seed afterwards.

== Use in horticulture ==
In cultivation, the species prefers a situation in part shade and with some moisture. It copes with a range of soil types and tolerates moderate frost. Fast-growing, it can be used as a "filler" plant in the garden. It is readily propagated by cuttings.
