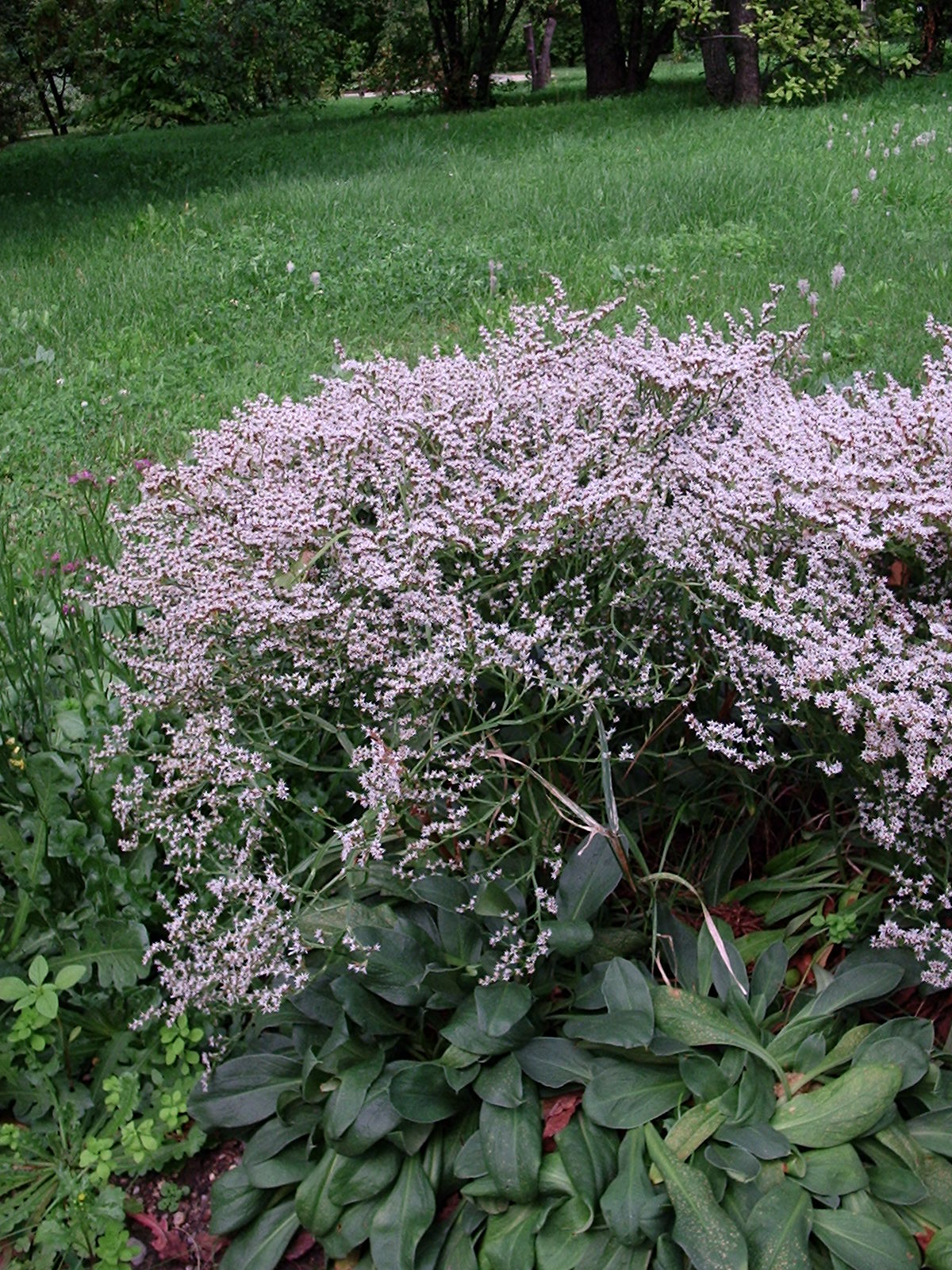
- Goniolimon tataricum

Scientific classification
- Kingdom: Plantae
- Clade: Tracheophytes
- Clade: Angiosperms
- Clade: Eudicots
- Order: Caryophyllales
- Family: Plumbaginaceae
- Genus: Goniolimon; Boiss.

Species
- See text

Synonyms
- Ikonnikovia Lincz.

= Goniolimon =

Genus of flowering plants

Goniolimon, sometimes called the statices, are a genus of flowering plants in the leadwort and plumbago family Plumbaginaceae, native to northern Africa, southern Europe, western and central Asia, Siberia, Mongolia and China. Low-lying perennial shrubs, some species are cultivated as ground covers.

== Species ==
Currently accepted species include:

- Goniolimon africanum Buzurovic, Bogdanovic & Brullo
- Goniolimon besserianum (Schult. ex Rchb.) Kusn.
- Goniolimon callicomum (C.A.Mey.) Boiss.
- Goniolimon caucasicum Klokov
- Goniolimon dalmaticum (C.Presl) Rchb.
- Goniolimon dshungaricum (Regel) O.Fedtsch. & B.Fedtsch.
- Goniolimon elatum (Fisch. ex Spreng.) Boiss.
- Goniolimon eximium (Schrenk) Boiss.
- Goniolimon graminifolium (Aiton) Boiss.
- Goniolimon heldreichii Halácsy
- Goniolimon incanum (L.) Hepper
- Goniolimon kaufmannianus (Regel) Voss
- Goniolimon krylovii A.V.Grebenjuk
- Goniolimon orthocladum Rupr.
- Goniolimon rubellum (S.G.Gmel.) Klokov
- Goniolimon sartorii Boiss.
- Goniolimon sewerzowii Herder
- Goniolimon speciosum (L.) Boiss.
- Goniolimon tataricum (L.) Boiss.
- Goniolimon tauricum Klokov

Former species; Goniolimon salicorniaceum (F.Muell.) Christenh. & Byng now called Muellerolimon salicorniaceum (F. Muell.) Lincz.
