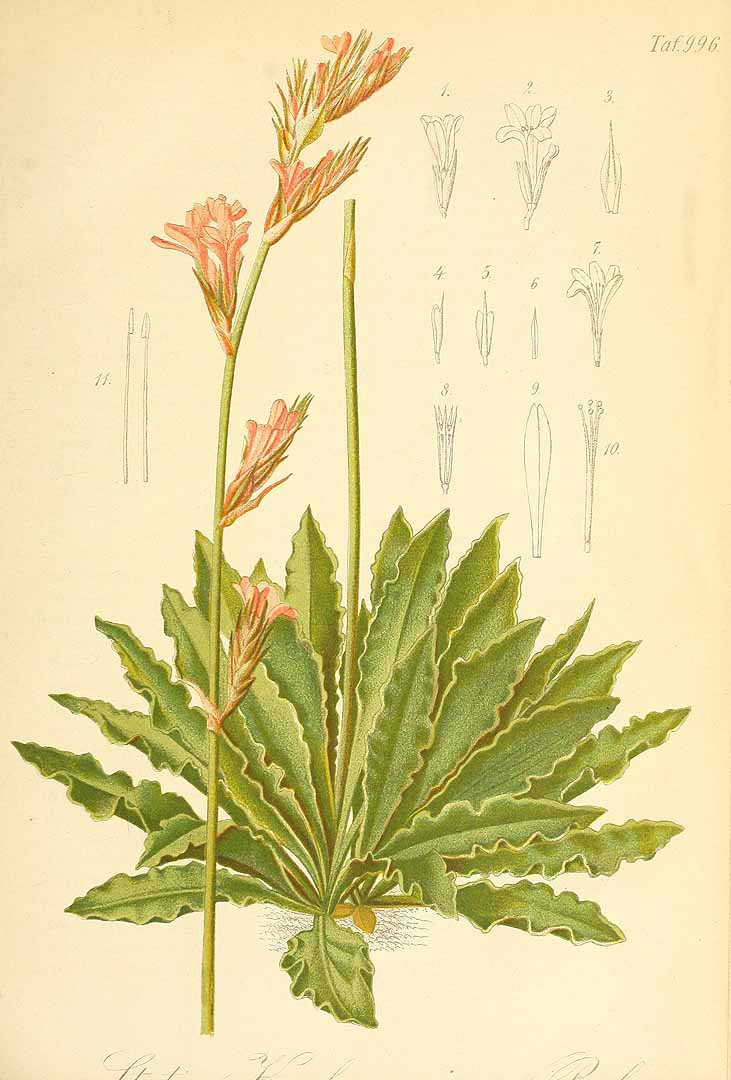

Scientific classification
- Kingdom: Plantae
- Clade: Tracheophytes
- Clade: Angiosperms
- Clade: Eudicots
- Order: Caryophyllales
- Family: Plumbaginaceae
- Genus: Goniolimon
- Species: G. kaufmannianus

Binomial name
- Goniolimon kaufmannianus (Regel) Voss (1894)

Synonyms
- Ikonnikovia kaufmanniana (Regel) Lincz. (1894); Limonium kaufmannianum (Regel) Kuntze (1891); Statice kaufmanniana Regel (1880)

= Goniolimon kaufmannianus =

Genus of flowering plants

Goniolimon kaufmannianus is a species of flowering plant in the family Plumbaginaceae. It is a subshrub native to Kazakhstan, Kyrgyzstan, and Xinjiang in Central Asia.
