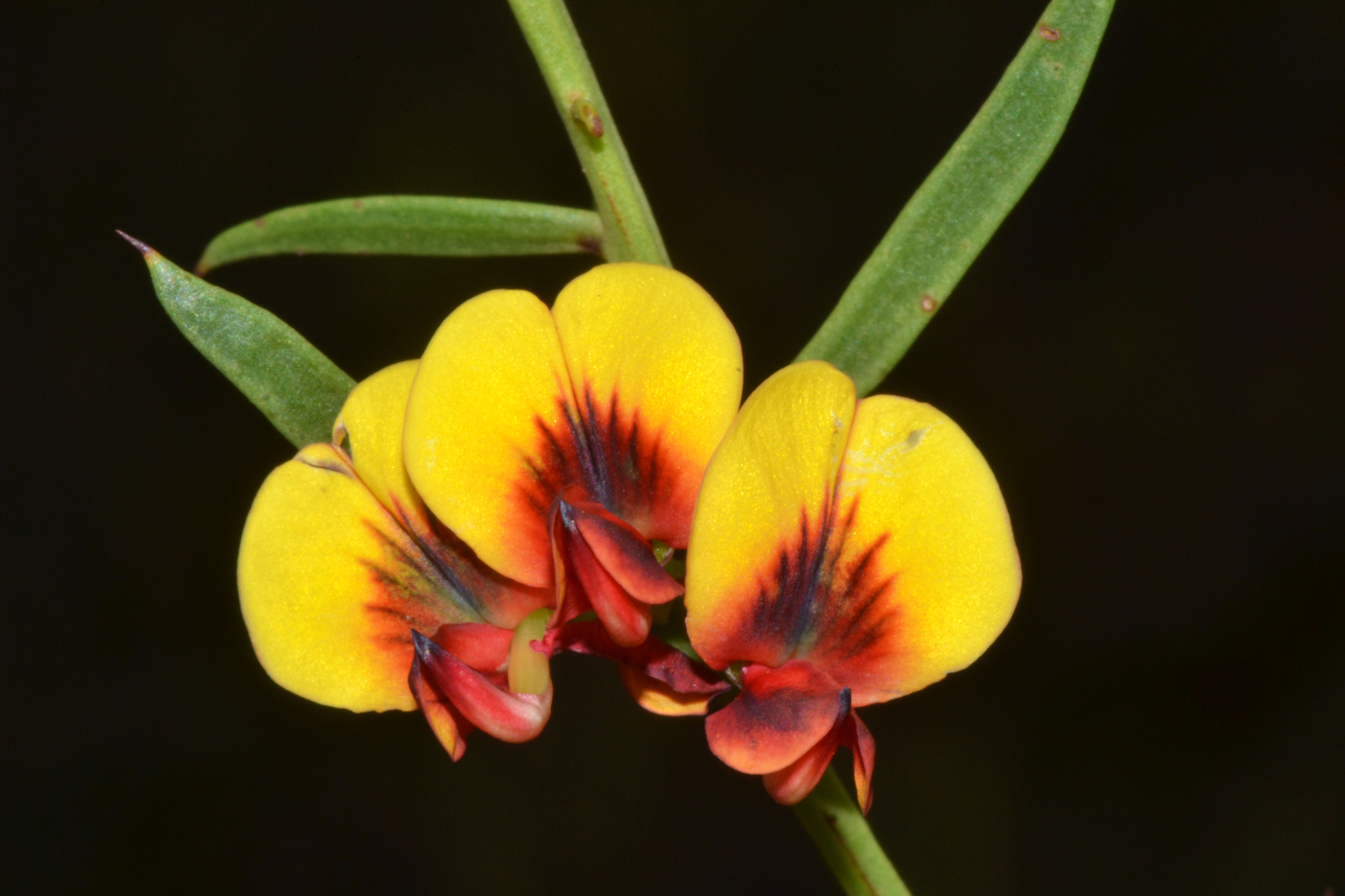
- Near Mogumber

Scientific classification
- Kingdom: Plantae
- Clade: Tracheophytes
- Clade: Angiosperms
- Clade: Eudicots
- Clade: Rosids
- Order: Fabales
- Family: Fabaceae
- Subfamily: Faboideae
- Genus: Daviesia
- Species: D. angulata

Binomial name
- Daviesia angulata Benth. ex Lindl.

= Daviesia angulata =

Species of flowering plant

Daviesia angulata is a species of flowering plant in the family Fabaceae and is endemic to the south-west of Western Australia. It is an erect, spreading shrub with prickly, flattened phyllodes, and yellow flowers with red markings.

== Description ==
Daviesia angulata is an erect, glabrous, spreading shrub that typically grows to a height of 0.4–1.5 m (1 ft 4 in – 4 ft 11 in). Its leaves are reduced to flattened, sharply-pointed, tapering phyllodes 10–35 mm (0.39–1.38 in) wide and 1–4 mm (0.039–0.157 in) wide. The flowers are arranged in leaf axils in groups of between two and four on a peduncle 2–6 mm (0.079–0.236 in) long, each flower on a pedicel 2–7.5 mm (0.079–0.295 in) long with oblong bracts at the base. The sepals are 2.5–3 mm (0.098–0.118 in) long, the lobes about 0.5 mm (0.020 in) long, the two upper lobes joined in a broad "lip" and the lower three triangular. The standard petal is broadly egg-shaped with the narrower end towards the base and a notched tip, yellow with red markings near the centre and 6–7 mm (0.24–0.28 in) long, the wings yellow, tinged with red and about 7–8 mm (0.28–0.31 in) long and the keel yellow with a red tinge and about 8.0–8.5 mm (0.31–0.33 in) long. Flowering mainly occurs from March to September and the fruit is a triangular pod 9–16 mm (0.35–0.63 in) long.

== Taxonomy and naming ==
Daviesia angulata was first formally described in 1839 by John Lindley in the A Sketch of the Vegetation of the Swan River Colony from an unpublished description by George Bentham. The specific epithet (angulata) means "angular", referring to the branchlets.

== Distribution and habitat ==
This species of pea mainly grows in jarrah forest and mallee-heath between Eneabba, Busselton, Wongan Hills and Mount Barker.

== Conservation status ==
Daviesia angulata is classified as "not threatened" by the Government of Western Australia Department of Biodiversity, Conservation and Attractions.
