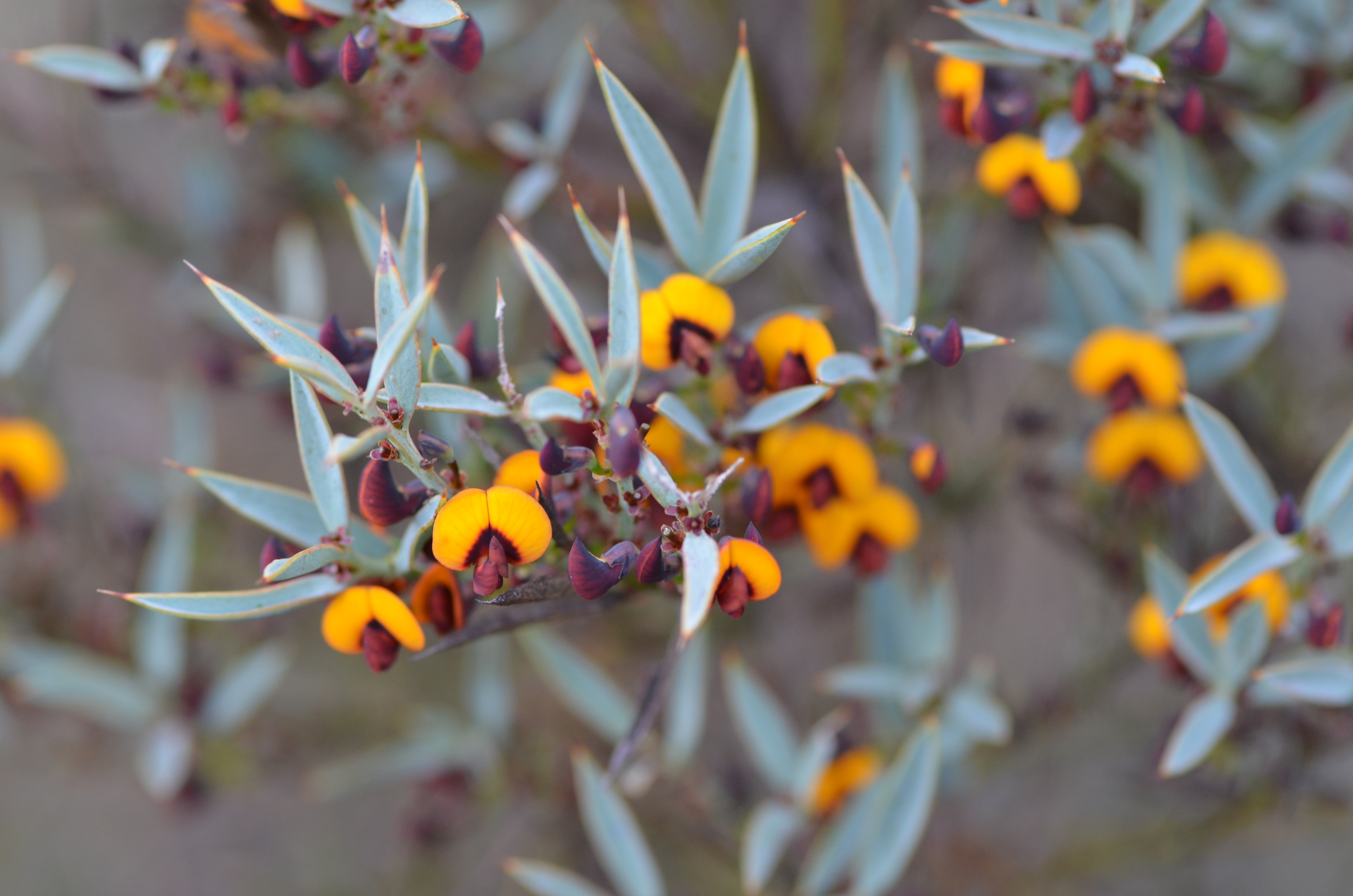
- In Kensington bushland

Scientific classification
- Kingdom: Plantae
- Clade: Tracheophytes
- Clade: Angiosperms
- Clade: Eudicots
- Clade: Rosids
- Order: Fabales
- Family: Fabaceae
- Subfamily: Faboideae
- Genus: Daviesia
- Species: D. nudiflora

Binomial name
- Daviesia nudiflora Meisn.

= Daviesia nudiflora =

Species of legume

Daviesia nudiflora is a species of flowering plant in the family Fabaceae and is endemic to the south-west of Western Australia. It is a bushy shrub with sharply pointed, egg-shaped to elliptic or oblong phyllodes, and yellow-orange flowers with reddish-brown markings.

== Description ==
Daviesia nudiflora is a bushy shrub that typically grows to a height of up to 0.3–2.5 m (1 ft 0 in – 8 ft 2 in) and has more or less angular or ridged branchlets. Its phyllodes are sharply pointed, egg-shaped to elliptic or oblong, 4–50 mm (0.16–1.97 in) long, 2–18 mm (0.079–0.709 in) wide, but sometimes scale-like and 1–4 mm (0.039–0.157 in) long near the base of the plant. The flowers are arranged singly or in pairs in the axils on a peduncle 0.5–2 mm (0.020–0.079 in) long, the pedicel 2–7 mm (0.079–0.276 in) long with bracts at the base of the peduncle. The sepals are 3.0–4.5 mm (0.12–0.18 in) long and joined at the base, the two upper lobes joined for most of their length and the lower three broadly triangular and about 1 mm (0.039 in) long. The standard petal is egg-shaped or elliptic, about 7–12 mm (0.28–0.47 in) long and 7–11 mm (0.28–0.43 in) wide, and yellow-orange with a red to brown base. The wings are 7–10 mm (0.28–0.39 in) long and red, and the keel is 6–10 mm (0.24–0.39 in) long and red. Flowering occurs from May to September and the fruit is a slightly flattened triangular pod 10–14 mm (0.39–0.55 in) long.

== Taxonomy ==
Daviesia nudiflora was first formally described in 1844 by Carl Meissner in Lehmann's Plantae Preissianae from specimens collected near Lake Monger in 1839. The specific epithet (nudiflora) means "naked-flowered".

In 1995, Michael Crisp described four subspecies and the names are accepted by the Australian Plant Census:

- Daviesia nudiflora subsp. amplectens Crisp has its phyllodes evenly distributed along the branchlets, spreading at 60-90°, with a heart-shaped, stem-clasping base, and a pod 7–9 mm (0.28–0.35 in) broad;
- Daviesia nudiflora subsp. drummondii (Meisn.) Crisp has its phyllodes evenly distributed along the branchlets, ascending at 0–30°, with a tapering base, and a pod 5–6 mm (0.20–0.24 in) broad;
- Daviesia nudiflora subsp. hirtella Crisp has its phyllodes crowded near the tips of the branchlets, spreading at 30–90°, but scale-like near the base of the plant, the edges of the phyllodes often with bristly hairs;
- Daviesia nudiflora Meisn. subsp. nudiflora is entirely glabrous and has its phyllodes crowded near the tips of the branchles, spreading at 30–90°, but scale-like near the base of the plant.

== Distribution and habitat ==
This daviesia grows in mallee-heath with a shrubby understorey, and is widespread in the northern half of the wheatbelt, from near Kalbarri to near Lake Grace with disjunct populations near Bunbury and Southern Cross. Subspecies amplectens is restricted to the area from near Cadoux to near Dowerin, subsp. drummondii between Ballidu, York and Corrigin. Subspecies hirtella is found between Kalbarri, Regans Ford and Corrigin, and subsp. nudiflora has about the same distribution as the species, in the Avon Wheatbelt, Coolgardie, Geraldton Sandplains, Jarrah Forest, Mallee and Swan Coastal Plain biogeographic regions of south-western Western Australia.

== Conservation status ==
Daviesia nudiflora is listed as "not threatened" by the Government of Western Australia Department of Biodiversity, Conservation and Attractions, but subsp. drummondii is listed as "Priority Three", meaning that it is poorly known and known from only a few locations but is not under imminent threat, and subsp. amplectens as "Priority One", meaning that it is known from only one or a few locations that are potentially at risk.
