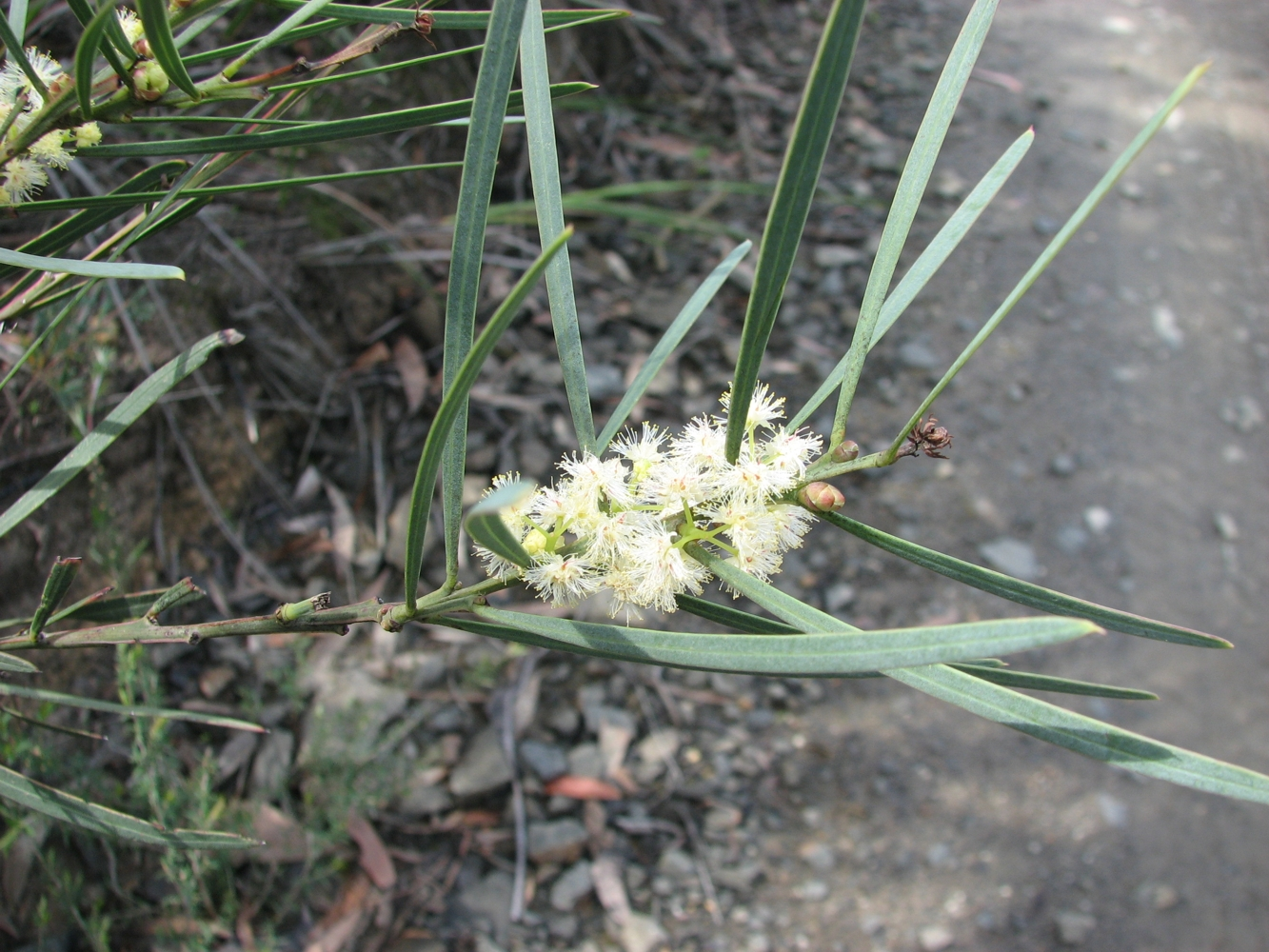
- At Anglesea Heath, Victoria

Scientific classification
- Kingdom: Plantae
- Clade: Embryophytes
- Clade: Tracheophytes
- Clade: Spermatophytes
- Clade: Angiosperms
- Clade: Eudicots
- Clade: Rosids
- Order: Fabales
- Family: Fabaceae
- Subfamily: Caesalpinioideae
- Clade: Mimosoid clade
- Genus: Acacia
- Species: A. suaveolens

Binomial name
- Acacia suaveolens (Sm.) Willd.

Synonyms
- List: Acacia angustifolia (Jacq.) H.L.Wendl.; Acacia odorata var. angustifolia (Jacq.) Desv. nom. inval.; Acacia suaveolens subsp. grampianensis D.A.Morrison & A.J.Rupp; Acacia suaveolens subsp. montana D.A.Morrison & A.J.Rupp; Acacia suaveolens subsp. myallensis D.A.Morrison & A.J.Rupp; Acacia suaveolens subsp. prostrata D.A.Morrison & A.J.Rupp; Acacia suaveolens (Sm.) Willd. subsp. suaveolens; Acacia suaveolens var. platycarpa DC.; Acacia suaveolens (Sm.) Willd. var. suaveolens; Hecatandra suaveolens (Sm.) Raf.; Mimosa ambigua K.D.Koenig & Sims nom. illeg.; Mimosa angustifolia Jacq.; Mimosa obliqua Lam.; Mimosa suaveolens Sm.; Phyllodoce angustifolia (Jacq.) Link; Phyllodoce suaveolens (Sm.) Link; Racosperma suaveolens (Sm.) Pedley

= Acacia suaveolens =

Species of plant

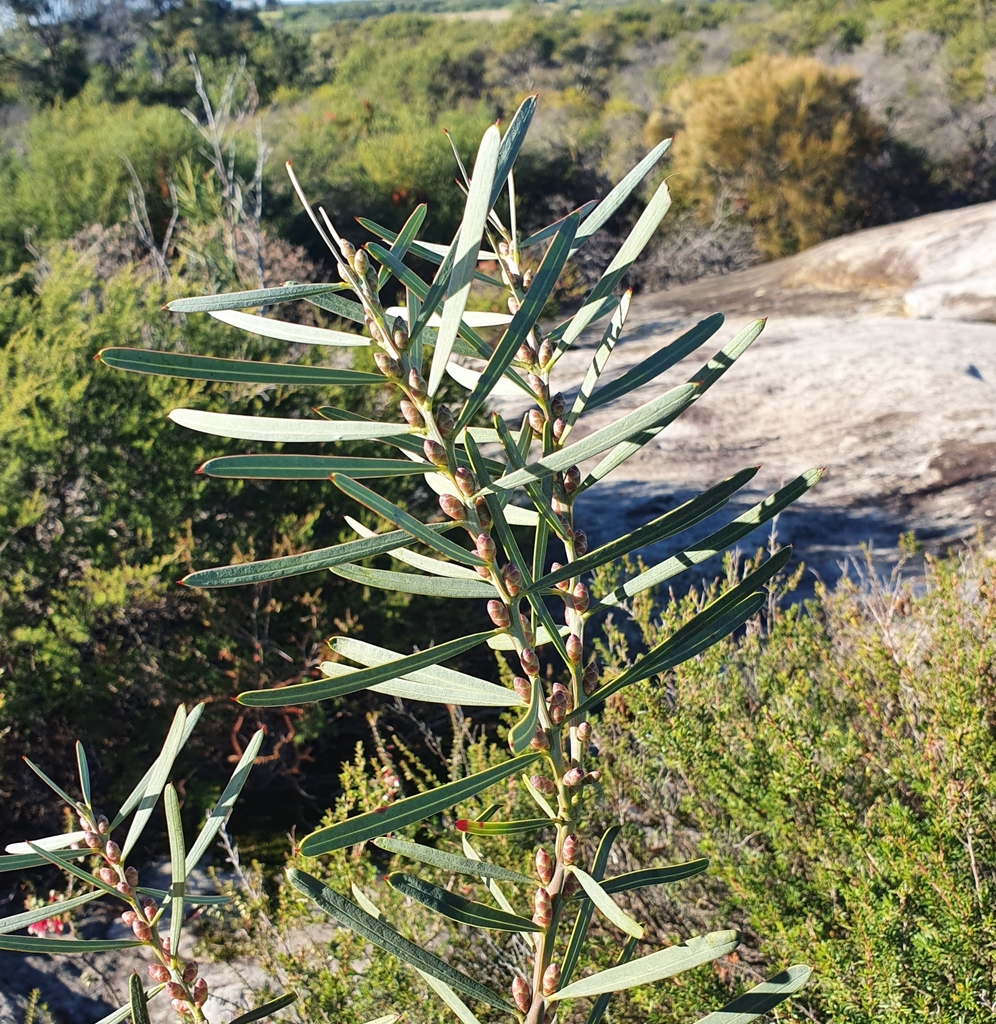
Habit near the Anzac Rifle Range, Malabar

Acacia suaveolens (sweet wattle) is a shrub species endemic to Australia. It grows to between 0.3 and 3.5 metres high and has smooth purplish-brown or light green bark and has straight or slightly curving blue-green phyllodes. The pale yellow to near white globular flower heads generally appear between April and September in its native range. These are followed by flattened, bluish oblong pods which are up to 2 to 5 cm long and 8 to 19 mm wide.

The species was first formally described by English botanist James Edward Smith in 1791 in Transactions of the Linnean Society of London. He described it with reference to a cultivated plant at Syon House which had been raised by Thomas Hoy from seed that originated from New South Wales. The species was transferred into the genus Acacia by Carl Ludwig Willdenow in 1806.

The species occurs naturally on sandy soils in heathland and dry sclerophyll forest in South Australia and Victoria, Tasmania, New South Wales and Queensland.

== Cultivation ==
This species provides winter colour in a garden and may be used as a low screen plant.
