= Shilajit =

Thick, sticky, tar-like substance

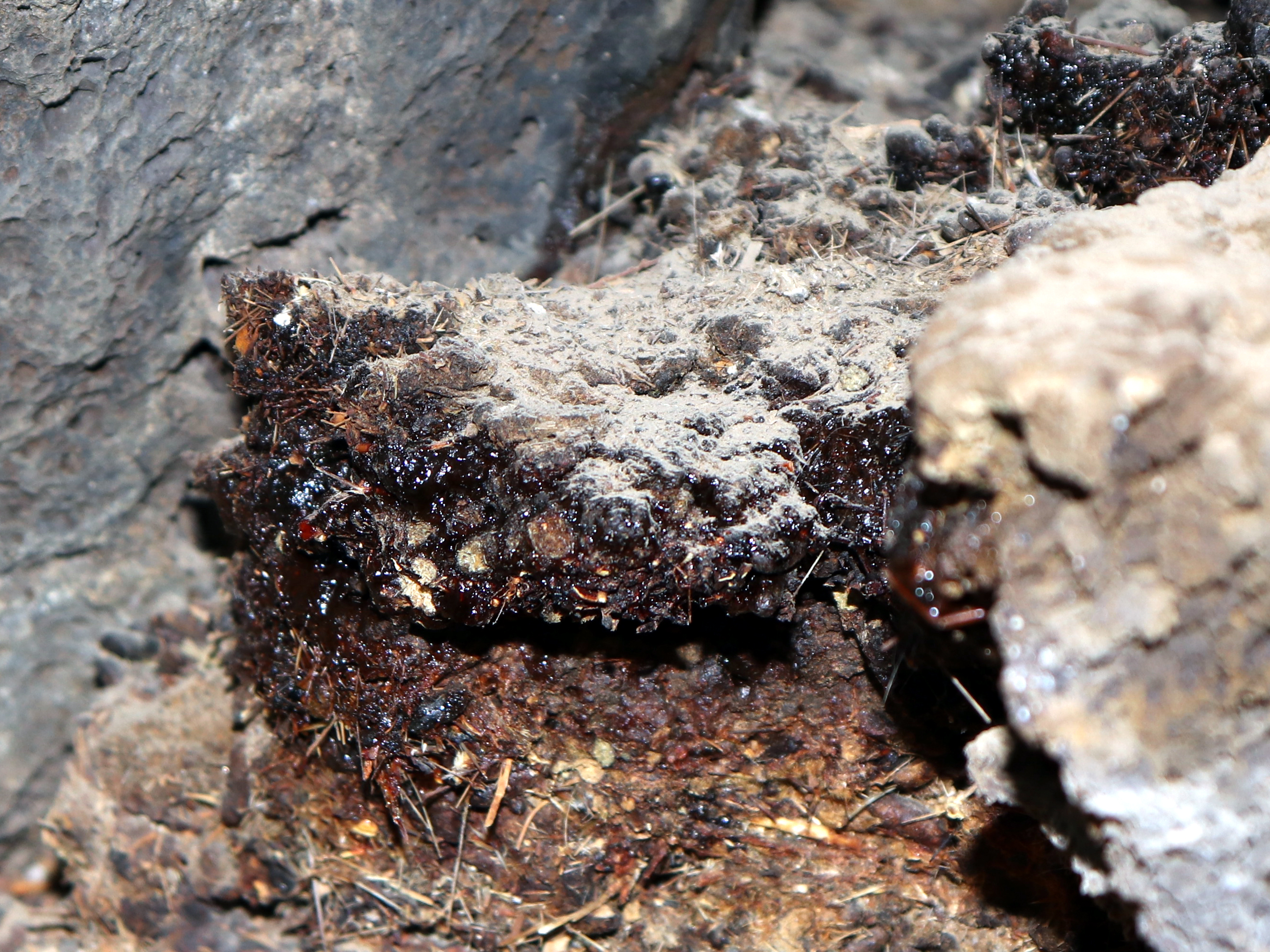
Shilajit or mumijo, Mohave lava tube, 2018

Shilajit (Sanskrit: शिलाजित्) or shilajatu (शिलाजतु; lit. mountain/rock bitumen/lac), is an organic-mineral product of predominantly biological origin, formed at high altitudes on stony mountains, in sheltered crevices and caves.

It is a blackish-brown powder or an exudate emerging between high mountain rocks, often found in the Altai Mountains, the Caucasus Mountains, the Himalayas (especially in India, Pakistan, Nepal, and the Tibetan Plateau), the Karakoram, the Pamir Mountains (primarily in Gorno-Badakhshan, Tajikistan), and countrywise in Afghanistan, Bhutan, Georgia, India (regions of Himachal Pradesh and Uttarakhand), Iran, Kyrgyzstan, Mongolia, Nepal, Russia, Central Asia and Africa.

People living in these areas use shilajit in folk and non-traditional (alternative) medicine (Ayurveda, Chinese, Tibetan). Shilajit is sold both in dry extract form and in dietary supplements, but there is limited evidence that shilajit has any beneficial effects on human health. Some sources have been found in studies to contain hazardous heavy metals, including lead.

== History ==
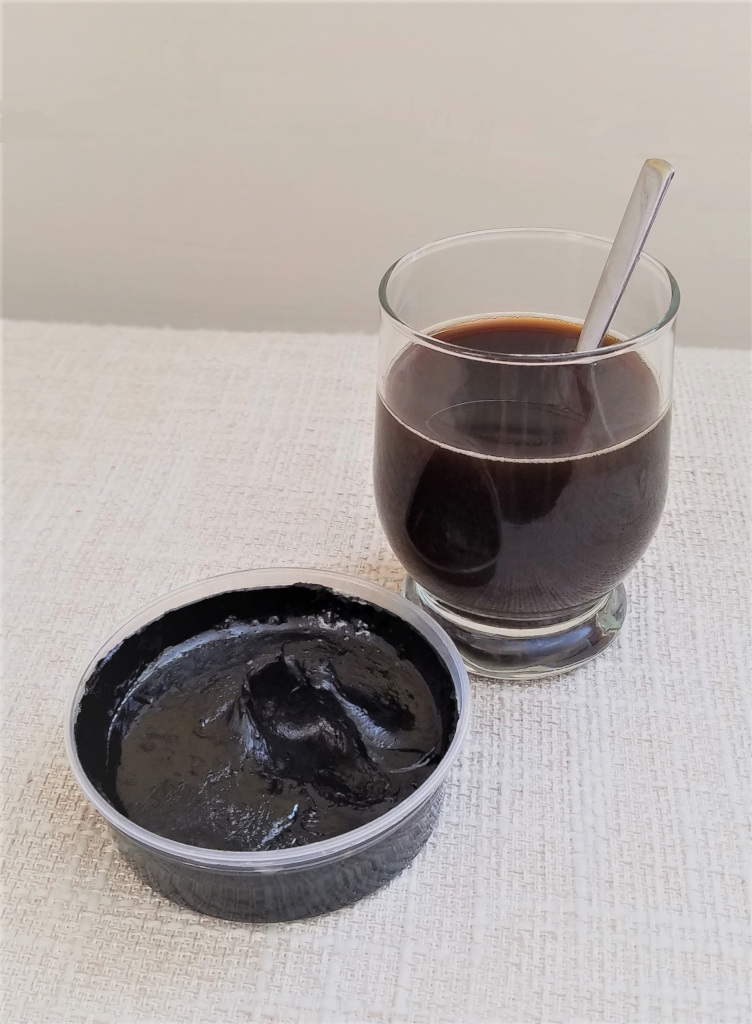
Shilajit, as commonly consumed

Since ancient times, shilajit has been a folk medicine in Afghanistan, India, Iran, China, Nepal, Central Asia, Central Africa and Tibet. Shilajit has been used as a folk medicine and in alternative medicine for more than four thousand years. The healing effects of shilajit for different diseases are mentioned in the works of Aristotle, Razi, Biruni, Ibn Sina and others.

D'Herbelot, in a 17th century publication, stated that the Persians used the substance called mumiay, or mummy, as a potent cure-all to address broken bones and disease.

== Distribution ==
Deposits of shilajit are found in many mountainous regions of the world. Research by the Central State Geographical Exploration Center "Tsentrquartz Gems" has shown that deposits of shilajit, despite the wide geography of their location, are very rare, and the reserves of raw materials in them are limited. It is found in calcareous, metamorphic rock, and sedimentary rocks (from Proterozoic to Quaternary) in Central Asia, Tuva, at the Lake Baikal, in the Caucasus and other regions. It is more often found in the Himalayas, Tibetan Plateau, mountains of the Arabian Peninsula, Iran, Mongolia, Myanmar, Tanzania, Kenya.

The substance is known by different names, including μούμια (in Greek), mumiyo or mumie (Russian: Мумиё), brag-shun or barakhshin ("oil of the mountains" in Mongolia and southern Russian Siberian regions near the Sayan Mountains such as Khakassia and Buryatia), rock sap or rock juice (in Tibet, Central Asia, Himalaya, Pamir and Altai), asphalt, mineral pitch, Jew's pitch, slag or mineral wax (in English), silajita or silajatu (in Bengali), hajarul-Musa or araq-al-jibal (in Arabic), myemu, moomiaii or mumnaei (in Persian), Mumie (in German), kao-tun ("blood of the mountain" in Myanmar) and "blessing of nature" (Nepal).

== Formation ==
It has also been believed that it is formed as a result of the decomposition of oil rocks by microorganisms. Analysis from the 1970s shows the chemical composition of organic part of the extract (about 50% carbon and 10% hydrogen) proved the oil origin hypothesis. Some researchers hypothesize that shilajit is produced by the decomposition or humification of latex and resin-bearing plant material from species such as Euphorbia royleana and Trifolium repens over a period of centuries. Another hypothesis is that it is formed from Bryophytes in the immediate area.

== Composition ==
Shilajit is a mineral tar or resin. It is highly viscous and very dark brown or black in color. It contains more than 20 elements, including calcium, magnesium, sodium, iron, chromium, and lead. It also contains solid paraffin hydrocarbons, proteins, carbohydrates, amino acids, fatty acids, and alcohols. The mineral content is 15–20%, along with trace elements, including selenium and heavy metals like mercury and cadmium.

Shilajit is composed of 60–80% humic substances, such as humic and fulvic acids.

Studied by analytical methods, shilajit samples from the Himalayas (5.1 kDa), Altai (8 kDa), Tian Shan (7.5 kDa), Dzungarian (9.0 kDa), demonstrated that it consists of two principal components: the high-molecular part is fulvic nature of sample as typical peat fulvic acids (sample from Sakhtysh Lake, Russia), and the low-molecular part represents a range of vegetative and animal metabolites such as methyldiaminocyclohexane, shikimic acid, hippuric acid, quinic acid, hydroxyhippuric acid, and methyldiaminocyclohexane dimer.

== Research ==
There is a lack of evidence that shilajit is bioactive; its claimed antioxidant and immuno-modulatory effects lack scientific validation.

A 2024 systematic review found that purified Shilajit extract (PrimaVie) may have efficacy in increasing testosterone levels in men with late-onset hypogonadism.

== Varieties ==
The composition varies by location and appearance:

- Coprolitic (mumiyo-saladji, Pamir and Altai mumiyo, mumiyo-asil, etc.) are semi-fossilized phyto- and zooorganic remains of animal feces mixed with fragments and grus of rocks and soil formations. The content of extractive substances in coprolite shilajit ranges from 10 to 30% or more.
- Shilajit-bearing breccias are large-clastic rocks (more often, fissured limestones) cemented by shilajit-bearing clay mass. The content of extractive substances is 0.5–5.0%.
- Evaporite shilajit occurs in formations of streaks, icicles and shiny black or gray dull, thin films that stain the roofs and walls of caves, niches, grottoes and other large cavities. Its extraction is difficult.

Shilajit is sold in different colors and grades according to the type of metal powders that are supposedly added: red (sauvarna shilajit) with gold, white (rajat shilajit) with silver, blue (tamra, with copper shilajit) and iron-containing black (lauha shilajit shilajit). Of these, black shilajit containing gold is the rarest and is considered to have the best curative effect. In nature, shilajit containing iron is used most in traditional medicine.

Mumioids are a group of natural formations resembling shilajit in appearance. The group includes ozokerite, saltpeter, fossilized vegetable resins and gums, mountain wax, white, stone and mountain oils, Antarctic shilajit, lofor, or aqua bitum.

== See also ==
- balsam
- bitumen of Judea
- creosote
- elaterite
- mummia
- amberat
- ozokerite
- propolis
- resin
- Treacle mining
- wax
