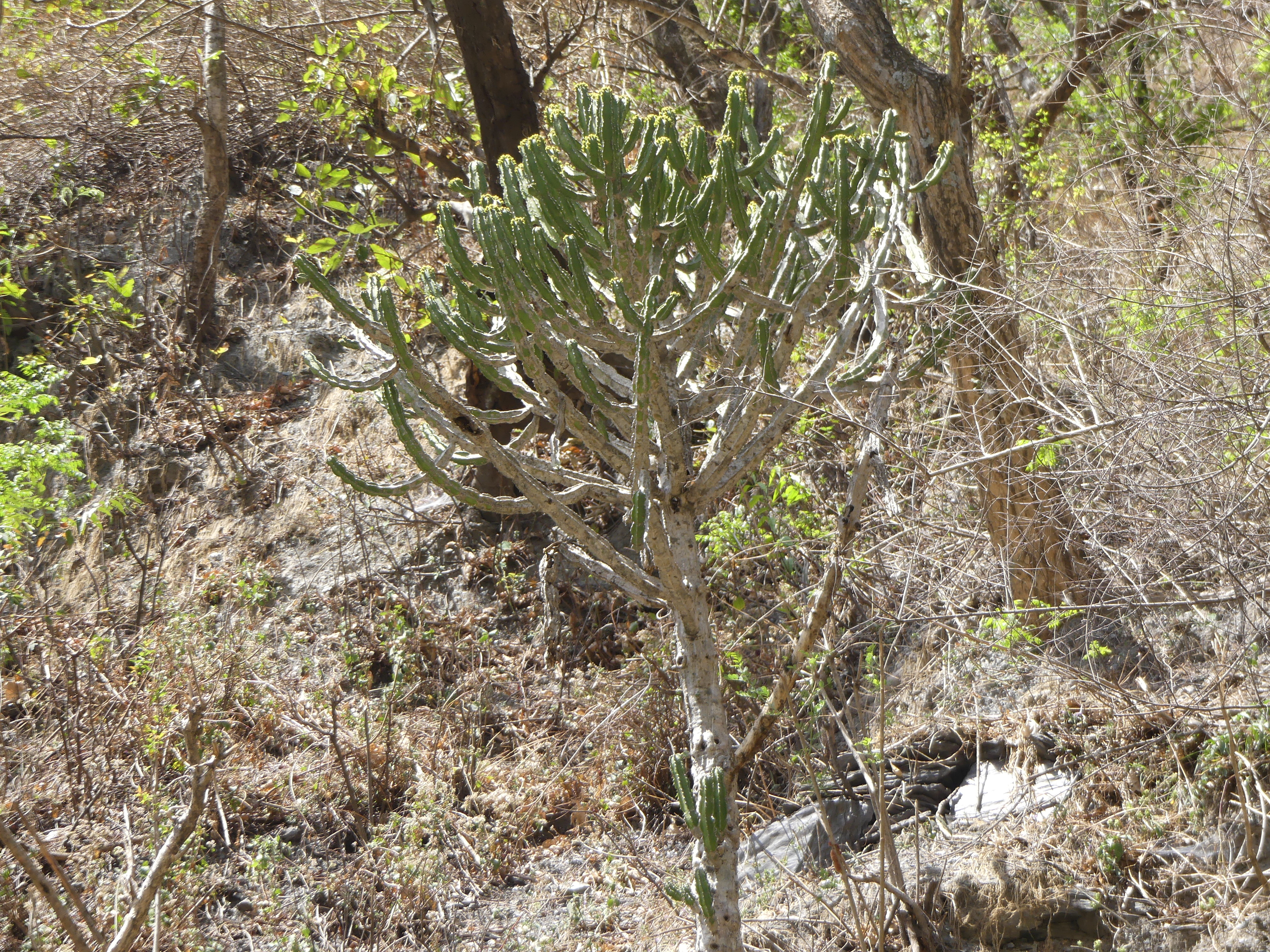

Scientific classification
- Kingdom: Plantae
- Clade: Embryophytes
- Clade: Tracheophytes
- Clade: Spermatophytes
- Clade: Angiosperms
- Clade: Eudicots
- Clade: Rosids
- Order: Malpighiales
- Family: Euphorbiaceae
- Genus: Euphorbia
- Species: E. royleana

Binomial name
- Euphorbia royleana Boiss.

Synonyms
- Euphorbia pentagona Royle

= Euphorbia royleana =

Species of flowering plant

Euphorbia royleana is a species of flowering plant in the family Euphorbiaceae. It is also known as Sullu spurge, and Royle's spurge. It is a succulent and almost cactus-like in appearance, although unrelated. It grows right across the Himalaya mountains from Pakistan, India, Bhutan, Myanmar, Nepal to western China. It prefers dry and rocky slopes between 1000–1500 m altitude, but has been found up to 2000 m. Flowering and fruiting is in spring to early summer (March to July) and seeding is in June to October. It is used as a hedging plant in northern India and has medicinal uses. It is an outlier of an assembly of succulent tree spurges which are otherwise confined to South Africa, East Africa and Madagascar with another outlier in the caatinga of Brazil.

== Description ==
Euphorbia royleana is a deciduous, cactus-like, shrub or small upright tree up to 2-7(-8) m high, which is armed with short prickles along its stems. It has a stout trunk and is glabrous except for the flowers (cyathia). The cyathia are small greenish-yellow, 3–4 appear in almost stalkless clusters in leaf axils.

It has succulent segmented branches in whorls, which are green to greyish green, 4-7(-8) cm thick, with branching from the upper parts. The stems have ribs 5(-7), angles more or less undulately winged with rounded teeth/tubercles. It has stout tap roots.

The stems become leafless during hot and cold seasons and the leaves are alternate, apically clustered. They are produced in the moist season and soon fall. They are usually not seen when in flower. The leaf blade is fleshy oblanceolate, spathulate, or spoon-shaped 5-15 long, 1–4 cm wide and slightly succulent. The base is attenuate, the margin entire, and the apex obtuse or subtruncate. Veins are inconspicuous. The petiole is absent.

Stipular spines are present in small in pairs on the edges on distinct shield, with broad flat faces between, 3–5 mm long.

The cyathia, or false flowers, are greenish-yellow, almost stalkless, 3-4 in subterminal cymes in leaf axils. They are peduncle about 5 mm long. Cyathophylls as long as involucre, membranous. Involucre ca. 2.5 × 2.5 mm. Nectar-glands 5, transversely elliptic, dark yellow. Seed capsules are trigonous, 1-1.2 × 1-1.5 cm, light reddish brown, smooth and glabrous. The seeds themselves are 3-3.5 × 2.5–3 mm, brown, adaxially striate; caruncle absent.

== Medicinal use ==
It is a medicinal shrub used in Nepal locally known as siyuri or siudi. Its latex has purported molluscicidal properties.

Several researchers have noted that Euphorbia royleana has been observed growing near rock face collection sites of the Ayurvedic resin shilajit in the Himalayas. The plant is the likely origin of shilajit as its gum has a similar composition to the resin.

== Gallery ==
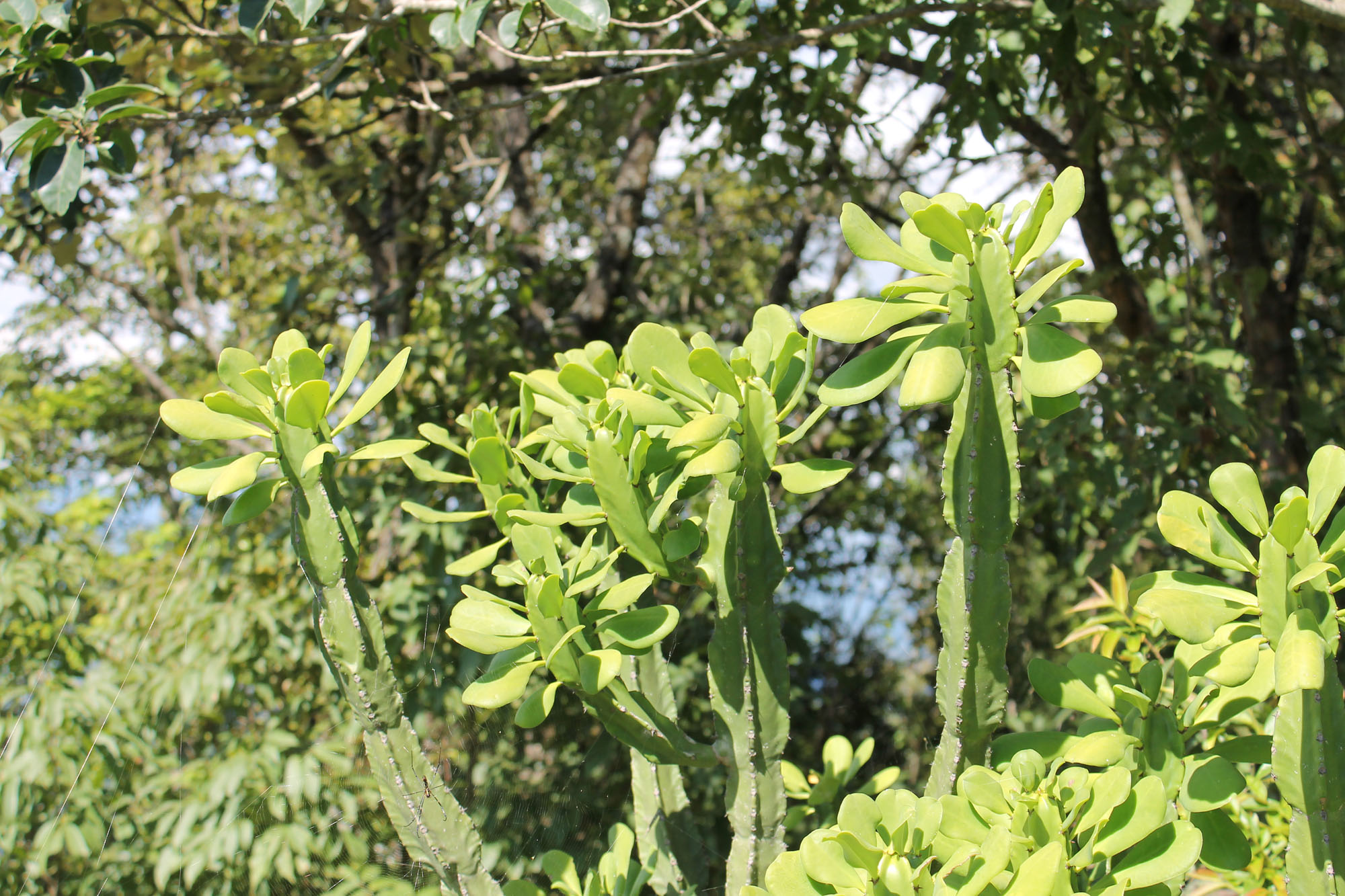
Euphorbia royleana in leaf

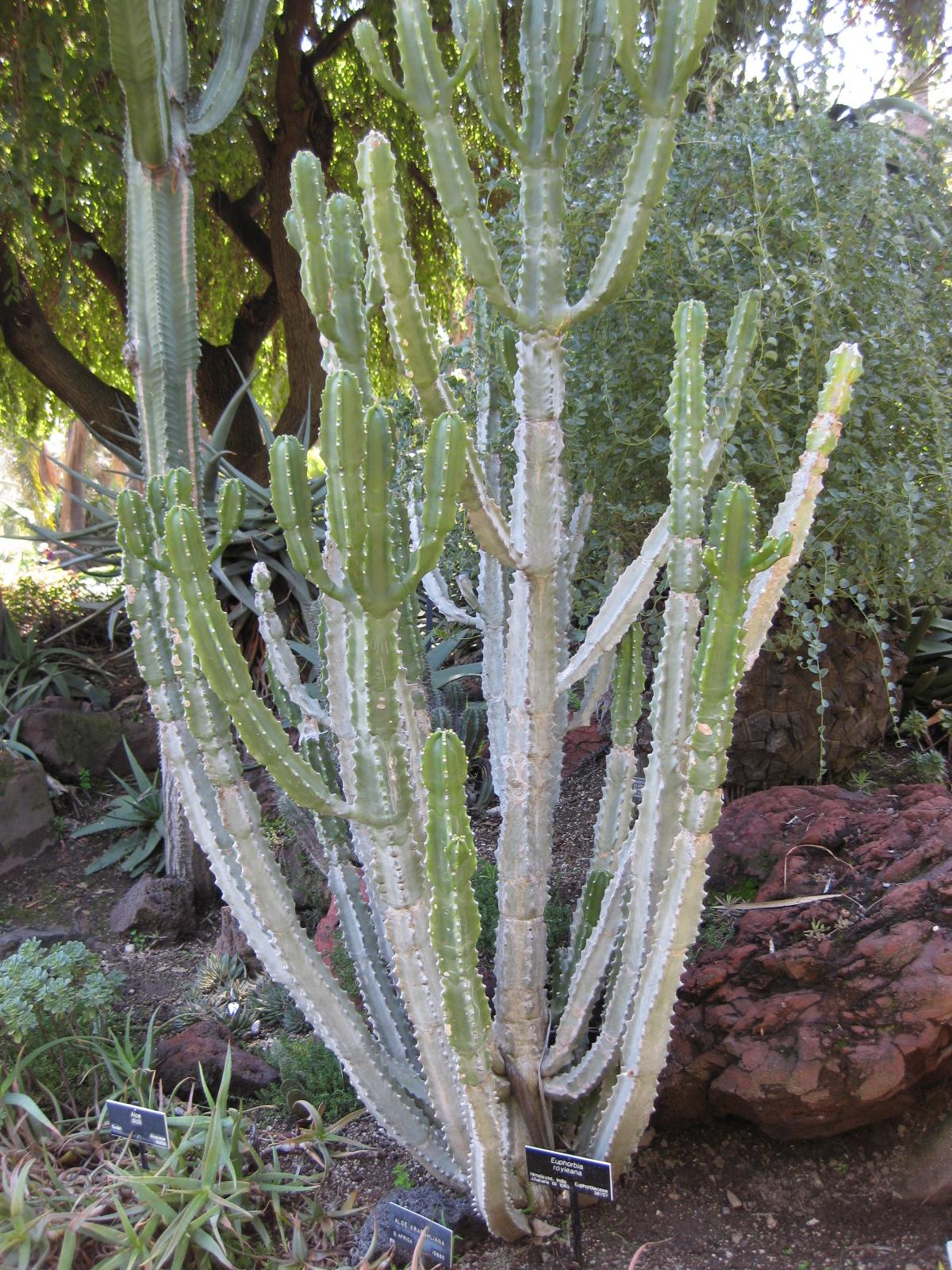
Huntington Gardens (Los Angeles)

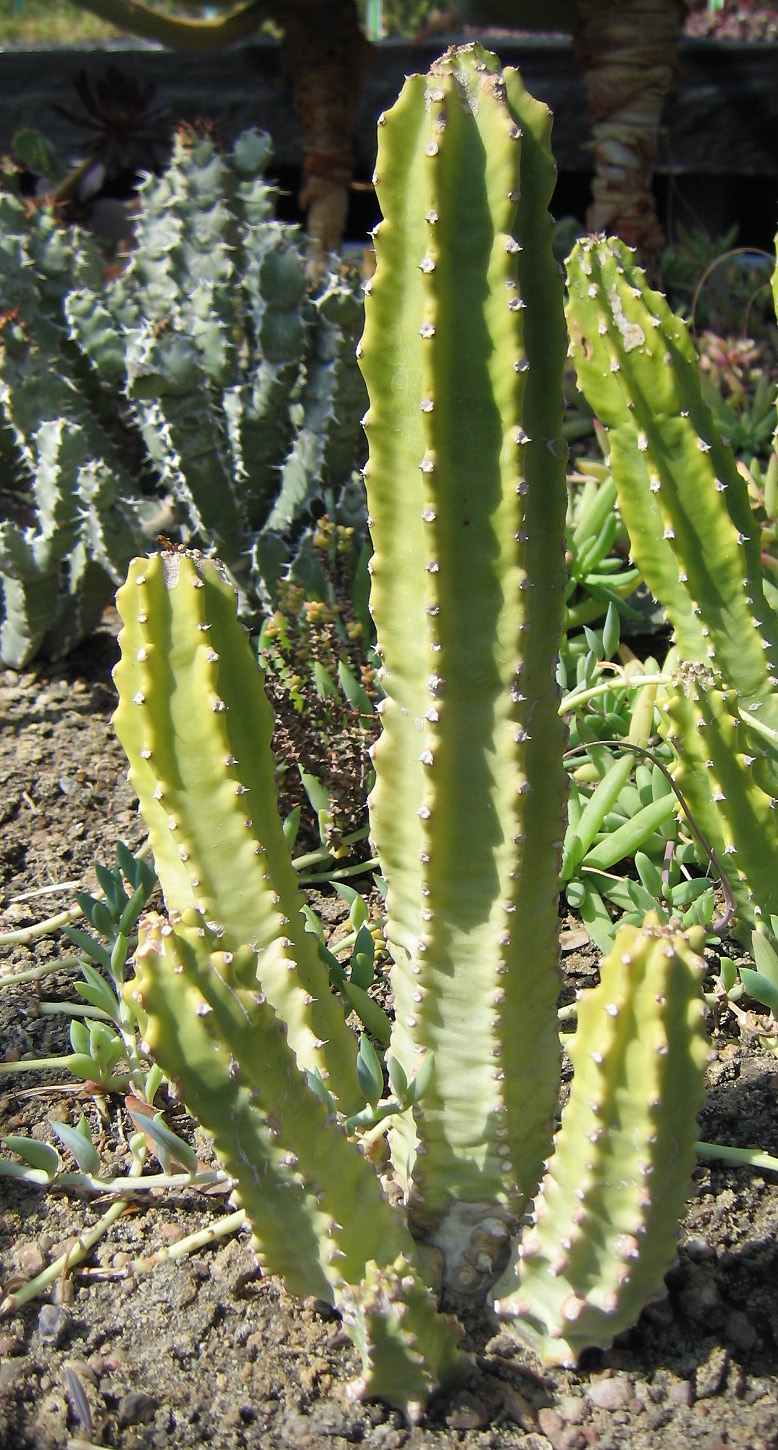
Botanical Garden, Wrocław, Poland

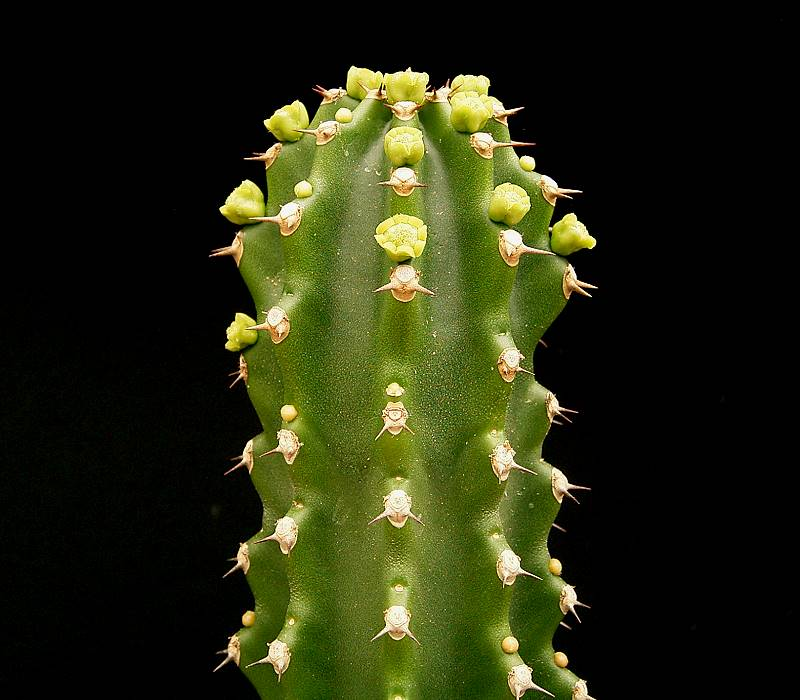
Close up of flowering tip

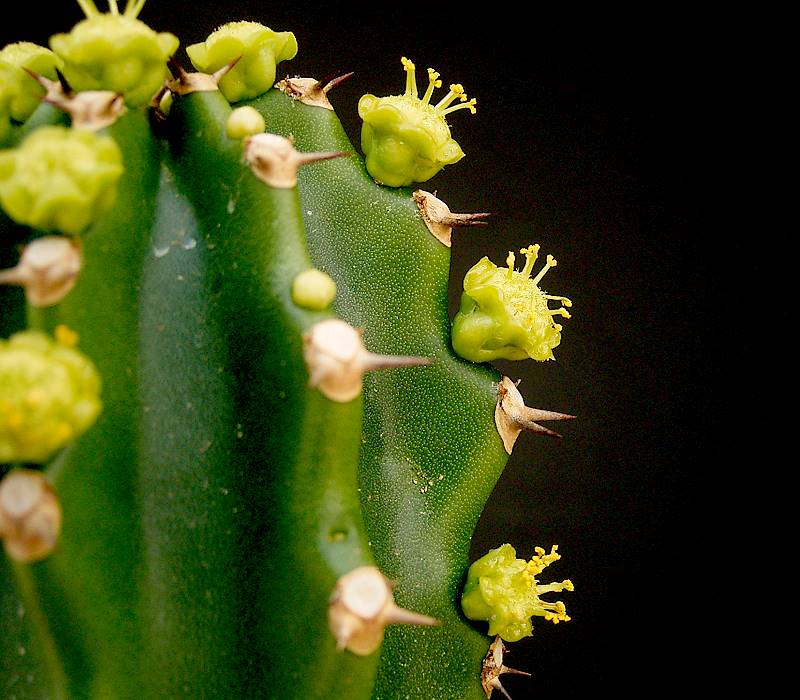
Close up of cyathia (false flowers)
