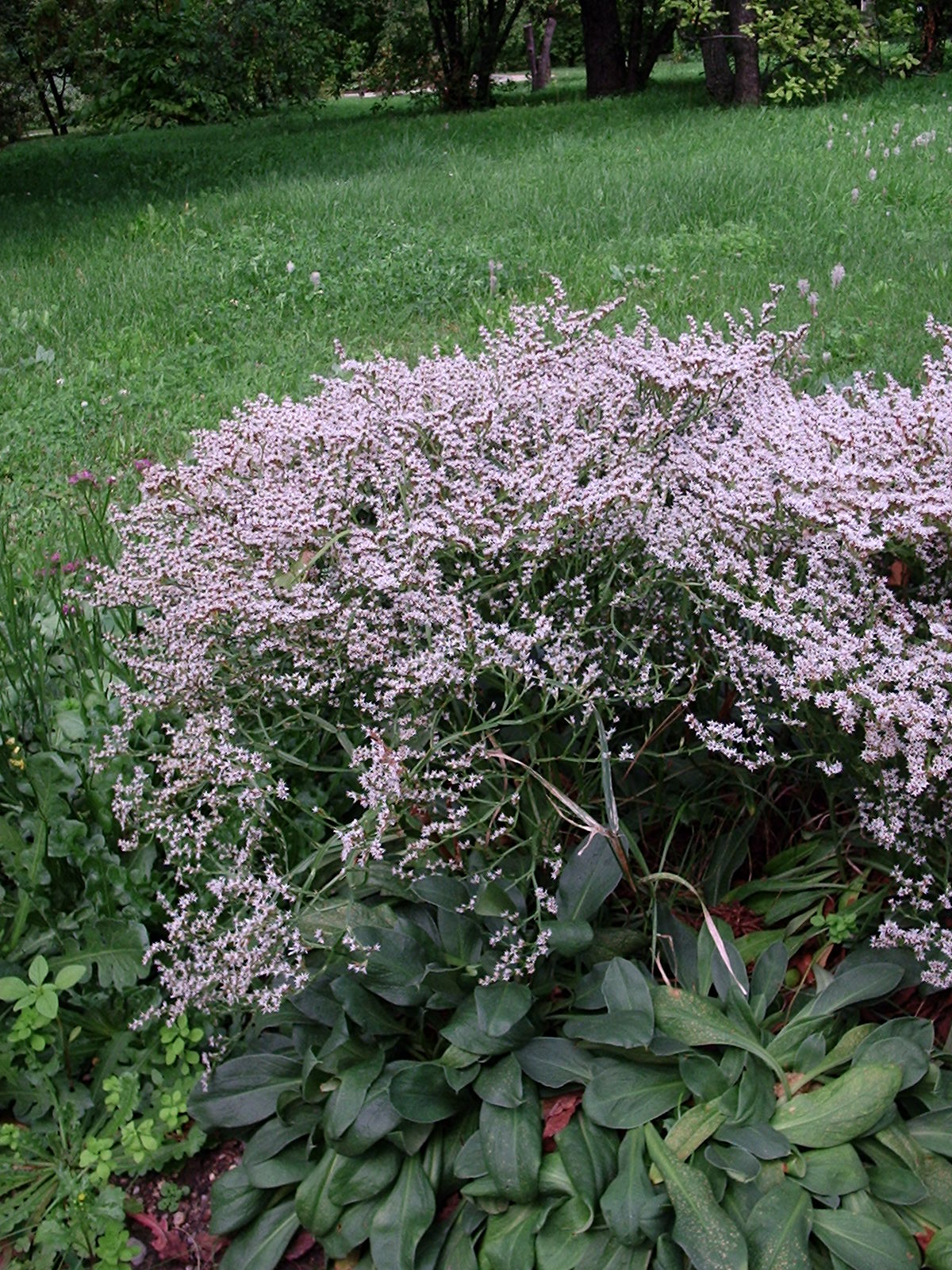

Scientific classification
- Kingdom: Plantae
- Clade: Tracheophytes
- Clade: Angiosperms
- Clade: Eudicots
- Order: Caryophyllales
- Family: Plumbaginaceae
- Genus: Goniolimon
- Species: G. tataricum

Binomial name
- Goniolimon tataricum (L.) Boiss.

Synonyms
- List: Goniolimon beckerianum Janka; Goniolimon tataricum var. kluchoricum Tzvelev; Limonium latifolium Moench; Limonium tataricum (L.) Mill.; Statice tatarica L.; Statice terekiensis Gueldenst.; Statice trigona Pall.; Statice triquetra Boeber; Taxanthema tatarica Sw.; Taxanthema tataricum (L.) Sweet

= Goniolimon tataricum =

Species of flowering plant

Goniolimon tataricum is a species of flowering plant in the genus Goniolimon, family Plumbaginaceae. It is called German statice, Tatarian sea-lavender, Tartarian statice or just statice. It is native to Albania, Algeria, Bulgaria, Greece, Kazakhstan, the North Caucasus, Romania, Southern Russia, Tunisia, Ukraine and the former Yugoslavia. It is planted in gardens as a border and groundcover, and also used in the cut-flower industry.

== Varieties ==
Two varieties are currently accepted:

- Goniolimon tataricum var. platypterum (Klokov) Tzvelev
- Goniolimon tataricum var. tauricum
