= List of local nature reserves in Kent =

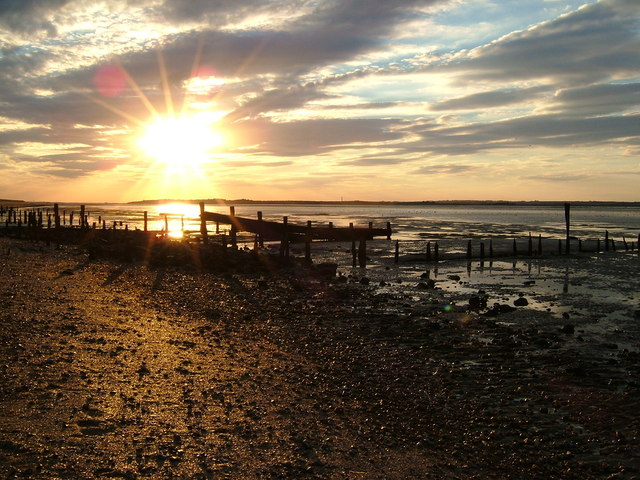
South Bank of the Swale

Kent is a county in the south-eastern corner of England. It is bounded to the north by Greater London and the Thames Estuary, to the west by Sussex and Surrey, and to the south and east by the English Channel and the North Sea. The county town is Maidstone. It is governed by Kent County Council, with twelve district councils, Ashford, Canterbury, Dartford, Dover, Folkestone and Hythe, Gravesham, Maidstone, Thanet, Tonbridge and Malling and Tunbridge Wells. Medway is a separate unitary authority. The chalk hills of the North Downs run from east to west through the county, with the wooded Weald to the south. The coastline is alternately flat and cliff-lined.

Local nature reserves are designated by local authorities under the National Parks and Access to the Countryside Act 1949. The local authority must have legal control over the site, by owning or leasing it or having an agreement with the owner. Local nature reserves are sites which have a special local interest either biologically or geologically. Local authorities have a duty to care for them and can apply local bye-laws to manage and protect them.

As of May 2018, there are 42 local nature reserves in the county. Thirteen are Sites of Special Scientific Interest, five are Ramsar internationally important wetland sites, three are Nature Conservation Review sites, five are Special Protection Areas under the European Union Directive on the Conservation of Wild Birds, two are Special Areas of Conservation, one is a Geological Conservation Review site, one includes a scheduled monument, one is a national nature reserve, five are managed by the Kent Wildlife Trust and one is owned by Plantlife.

== Key ==
=== Other classifications ===
- KWT = Kent Wildlife Trust
- GCR = Geological Conservation Review
- NCR = Nature Conservation Review site
- NNR = National nature reserve
- Plant = Plantlife, a wild plant conservation charity
- Ramsar = Ramsar site, an internationally important wetland site
- SAC = Special Area of Conservation
- SM = Scheduled monument
- SPA = Special Protection Area under the European Union Directive on the Conservation of Wild Birds
- SSSI = Site of Special Scientific Interest

== Sites ==
| Site | Photograph | Area (Note: The area is taken from the Natural England map of each site. (Click on the identify icon (i) in the "Feature Tools" and then click on the site.)) | Location (Note: The location is taken from the Natural England details page for the site.) | Borough | Other classifications | Map (Note: The maps are on the Natural England database of Local Nature Reserves.) | Details (Note: Details are on the pages on each site in the Natural England database of Local Nature Reserves.) | Description |
|---|---|---|---|---|---|---|---|---|
| Ambley Wood | Ambley Wood | 14.0 hectares (35 acres) | Gillingham; 51.361°N 0.573°E; TQ 792 656 | Medway | | Map | Details | The site has ancient woodland with typical woodland flora. |
| Ashford Community Woodland | Ashford Community Woodland | 13.8 hectares (34 acres) | Ashford; 51.136°N 0.834°E; TQ 984 412 | Ashford | | Map | Details | Most of this broadleaf wood was planted in 1985, and there is also rough grassland and scrub. Birds include the endangered skylark and yellowhammer and there butterflies such as marbled whites and small skippers. |
| Ashford Green Corridors | Ashford Green Corridors | 47.4 hectares (117 acres) | Ashford; 51.141°N 0.875°E; TR 012 419 | Ashford | | Map | Details | This site has a lake, ponds, pollarded trees, a meadow and parkland. Birds on Singleton Lake include kingfishers. |
| Barnett's Wood | Barnett's Wood | 12.4 hectares (31 acres) | Tunbridge Wells; 51.158°N 0.278°E; TQ 594 423 | Tunbridge Wells | | Map | Details | This site has ancient, semi-natural woodland and unimproved grassland. The meadows are grazed by cattle, and wildflowers include bird's-foot trefoil, common spotted orchid, cuckooflower, sneezewort, oxeye daisy and common knapweed. |
| Baty's Marsh | Baty's Marsh | 10.4 hectares (26 acres) | Rochester; 51.377°N 0.484°E; TQ 730 672 | Medway | | Map | Details | This is one of the few remaining salt marshes in the Medway area, and it has a rich fauna, especially wading birds. |
| Berengrave Chalk Pit | Berengrave Chalk Pit | 9.5 hectares (23 acres) | Rainham; 51.373°N 0.613°E; TQ 820 670 | Medway | | Map | Details | There is a small lake in a disused chalk pit, and other habitats are scrub, woodland and reedbeds, which flood an area of willow carr. |
| Bishopstone Cliffs | Bishopstone Cliffs | 67.4 hectares (167 acres) | Herne Bay; 51.376°N 1.177°E; TR 212 689 | Canterbury | Ramsar, SPA, SSSI | Map | Details | This is a grassland site on the top of cliffs, and it has some rare insect species. Sand martins nest in holes in the cliffs, and other birds include skylarks, meadow pipits and corn buntings. |
| Boxley Warren | Boxley Warren | 83.0 hectares (205 acres) | Maidstone; 51.315°N 0.527°E; TQ 762 603 | Maidstone | SAC, SM, SSSI | Map | Details | This site is yew woodland with a diverse fauna and flora. It includes the White Horse Stone, a Neolithic standing stone which is a scheduled monument. |
| Bus Company Island | Bus Company Island | 1.1 hectares (2.7 acres) | Canterbury; 51.283°N 1.080°E; TR 149 583 | Canterbury | | Map | Details | This is important as a reptile monitoring site. It was formerly a watermill, and then a bus park. It is now a meadow and orchard. |
| Crane Valley | Crane Valley | 0.8 hectares (2.0 acres) | Cranbrook; 51.093°N 0.532°E; TQ 774 357 | Tunbridge Wells | | Map | Details | Much of this site is wet woodland with lush vegetation, including the locally rare large bitter-cress. There is semi-natural woodland in drier areas, with oak, hornbeam and field maple. |
| Curtis Wood | Curtis Wood | 5.3 hectares (13 acres) | Herne Bay; 51.345°N 1.127°E; TR 179 653 | Canterbury | | Map | Details | This wood has a diverse ground flora including early purple and greater butterfly orchids. There is also a semi-improved meadow. |
| Darland Banks | Darland Banks | 29.1 hectares (72 acres) | Gillingham; 51.362°N 0.565°E; TQ 787 657 | Medway | KWT | Map | Details | This area of grassland, scrub and woodland has diverse fauna and flora, including the largest population of man orchids in Britain. There are birds such as willow warbler, yellowhammer, linnet and lesser whitethroat. |
| Ditton Quarry | Ditton Quarry | 5.6 hectares (14 acres) | Aylesford; 51.291°N 0.458°E; TQ 715 575 | Tonbridge and Malling | | Map | Details | This former quarry has grassland and scrub, with diverse fauna including butterflies, foxes, rabbits, frogs, toads and newts. The meadow is rich in wild flowers. |
| Dryhill | Dryhill | 9.4 hectares (23 acres) | Sevenoaks; 51.276°N 0.149°E; TQ 499 552 | Sevenoaks | GCR, SSSI | Map | Details | This former quarry exposes rocks dating to the Aptian stage in the early Cretaceous, around 120 million years ago. It is famous for its rich and diverse brachiopod and bivalve fossils, which are important for palaeoecological research. |
| Farningham Wood | Farningham Wood | 69.3 hectares (171 acres) | Dartford; 51.391°N 0.212°E; TQ 540 681 | Sevenoaks | SSSI | Map | Details | This wood has a variety of soil conditions, resulting in a diverse ground flora and invertebrates, some of which are typical of ancient woodland. Ponds in the middle support several species of amphibian, and the nationally rare hoverfly volucella inanis has been recorded on the site. |
| Foal Hurst Wood | Foal Hurst Wood | 12.9 hectares (32 acres) | Paddock Wood; 51.172°N 0.373°E; TQ 660 441 | Tunbridge Wells | | Map | Details | This site is mainly coppiced woodland and there is grassland at the northern end. Birds include green and great spotted woodpeckers, and there are flora such as orchids. |
| Folkestone Warren | Folkestone Warren | 83.6 hectares (207 acres) | Folkestone; 51.091°N 1.203°E; TR 244 373 | Folkestone and Hythe | SSSI | Map | Details | These chalk cliffs have several nationally rare plants and they provide a location for cliff nesting and wintering birds. The SSSI also contains two internationally important reference sites for study of the Cretaceous period. |
| Foxburrow Wood | Foxburrow Wood | 6.1 hectares (15 acres) | Rainham; 51.350°N 0.599°E; TQ 811 644 | Medway | | Map | Details | This is a remnant of a much larger historic wood, and it has flora which are indicators of ancient woodland such as herb paris and bluebells. |
| Foxes Cross Bottom | Foxes Cross Bottom | 4.0 hectares (9.9 acres) | Whitstable; 51.332°N 1.003°E; TR 093 635 | Canterbury | | Map | Details | This site has diverse habitats of grassland, scrub, broadleaved woodland, ponds, ditches and hedges. The meadows are grazed by ponies and highland cattle. |
| Haysden Country Park | Haysden Country Park | 64 hectares (160 acres) | Tonbridge; 51.192°N 0.247°E; TQ 571 460 | Tonbridge and Malling | | Not available | Details | The River Medway goes through this site and there are two lakes. Other habitats are marshes, woods and grassland, and flora include Dyer's Greenweed and narrow leaved water dropwort. |
| High Meadow | High Meadow | 21.3 hectares (53 acres) | Dover; 51.129°N 1.289°E; TR 302 418 | Dover | | Map | Details | This hilltop meadow has views in all directions. It is grazed by konik horses, which help to preserve the variety of plants and animals. Flora include fragrant, common spotted and pyramidal orchids. |
| Hilbert Woods | Hilbert Woods | 14.3 hectares (35 acres) | Tunbridge Wells; 51.143°N 0.276°E; TQ 593 407 | Tunbridge Wells | | Map | Details | This gently sloping wood has oak, hazel and beech on the dry upper slopes, and alder on lower and wetter areas running down to a stream. The insect fauna is rich and diverse, including rare species. |
| Hothfield Common | Hothfield Common | 56.6 hectares (140 acres) | Ashford; 51.178°N 0.814°E; TQ 968 458 | Ashford | KWT, SSSI | Map | Details | This site has areas of heath and the best valley bog in the county, both habitats which are uncommon in Kent. Over a thousand insect species have been recorded, several of which are nationally rare, such as the bee Lasioglossum semilucens and the cranefly Tipula holoptera. |
| Jumping Downs | Jumping Downs | 5.7 hectares (14 acres) | Canterbury; 51.194°N 1.136°E; TR 192 485 | Canterbury | | Map | Details | Adders, viviparous lizards and slow worms have been recorded on this chalk downland site. Mammals include wood mice and pygmy shrews. |
| Larkey Valley Wood | Larkey Valley Woods | 44.4 hectares (110 acres) | Canterbury; 51.257°N 1.044°E; TR 125 553 | Canterbury | SSSI | Map | Details | This wood has a diverse ground flora with some uncommon plants and many breeding birds, such as tree pipits, nuthatches and hawfinches. Flora include the scarce lady orchid. |
| Levan Strice | Levan Strice | 2.8 hectares (6.9 acres) | Gillingham; 51.344°N 0.586°E; TQ 802 637 | Medway | | Map | Details | This site is a fragment of ancient woodland and associated flora surrounded by houses. |
| No Man's Orchard | No Man's Orchard | 4.1 hectares (10 acres) | Canterbury; 51.275°N 1.021°E; TR 108 572 | Canterbury | | Map | Details | "No man's land" means an area which straddles two areas of ownership, in this case the boundary between the parishes of Chartham and Harbledown. It is one of the few remaining traditional orchards in the Stour Valley. |
| Oare Marshes | Oare Marshes | 71.4 hectares (176 acres) | Faversham; 51.344°N 0.886°E; TR 011 645 | Swale | KWT, NCR, NNR, Ramsar, SPA SSSI | Map | Details | This site has salt marshes, fresh water dykes and reed beds. It is of international importance for migratory, overwintering and breeding wetland birds, such as avocets, marsh harriers and shovelers. |
| Poulton Wood | Poulton Wood | 10.2 hectares (25 acres) | Ashford; 51.090°N 0.937°E; TR 058 364 | Ashford | | Map | Details | This is a woodland of coppiced oak, hornbeam and ash, and spring flowers include bluebells. It is managed as a conservation project providing training in subjects such as coppice management and woodcrafts. |
| Prince's Beachlands | Prince's Beachlands | 6.0 hectares (15 acres) | Ramsgate; 51.299°N 1.374°E; TR 353 610 | Dover | KWT, NCR, Ramsar, SAC, SPA, SSSI | Map | Details | This site has diverse habitats and it is internationally important for its seabirds. It is also notable for its butterflies, fungi and reptiles. |
| Queendown Warren | Queendown Warren | 22.2 hectares (55 acres) | Rainham; 51.336°N 0.623°E; TQ 828 629 | Swale | KWT, NCR, Plantlife, SAC, SSSI | Map | Details | This site has dry grassland and woodland on a south facing slope. It has two rare plants, early spider orchid and meadow clary, and a rich variety of insects. |
| Rectory Meadow | Rectory Meadow | 2.2 hectares (5.4 acres) | Longfield; 51.393°N 0.303°E; TQ 603 685 | Dartford | | Map | Details | This site has chalk grassland and woodland. 193 species of flora have been recorded, including man orchids and cornflowers. |
| Rede Common | | 11.2 hectares | Strood 51°23.7157N 0°28.3164E TQ71946920 | Strood | | | Details | Known locally as Sandy Banks due to the underlying geology of sandstone, Rede Common was formerly farmland used for grazing, arable and market gardening and is now an area of open acid grasslands surrounded by scrub and trees. |
| River Len | River Len | 1.7 hectares (4.2 acres) | Maidstone; 51.271°N 0.533°E; TQ 768 555 | Maidstone | | Map | Details | This small site in an urban area next the River Len has some uncommon species such as water voles and soldier beetles. |
| Romney Warren | Romney Warren | 10.9 hectares (27 acres) | New Romney; 50.997°N 0.960°E; TR 078 261 | Folkestone and Hythe | KWT, Ramsar, SSSI | Map | Details | This site is formed from ancient sand dunes which have been left behind as the sea has retreated over the last two thousand years, and it has plants such as sea spurrey. There are also ponds left by gravel extraction, some permanent and others which dry out in the summer. |
| Seasalter Levels | Seasalter Levels | 71.4 hectares (176 acres) | Whitstable; 51.338°N 0.991°E; TR 084 641 | Canterbury | Ramsar, SPA, SSSI | Map | Details | This freshwater grazing marsh is important for wildfowl and wading birds such as wigeons, redshanks, lapwings, mallards and shelducks. |
| South Bank of the Swale | South Bank of the Swale | 410.5 hectares (1,014 acres) | Whitstable; 51.350°N 0.938°E; TR 047 653 | Canterbury | KWT, Ramsar, SPA, SSSI | Map | Details | This coastal site has wetland and grassland, with mudflats which attract a large population of waders and wildfowl in winter. Flora include yellow horned-poppies, sea-lavender, golden samphires and wild carrots. |
| South Wood | South Wood | 6.6 hectares (16 acres) | Gillingham; 51.346°N 0.566°E; TQ 788 639 | Medway | | Map | Details | This wood was formerly used for timber, and it is now managed as a nature reserve. It has a population of dormice, which are rare in Britain and continental Europe. |
| Tyler Hill Meadow | Tyler Hill Meadow | 0.8 hectares (2.0 acres) | Canterbury; 51.308°N 1.065°E; TR 137 610 | Canterbury | | Map | Details | The site has unimproved grassland, woodland and scrub. Reptiles include slow-worms and lizards, and eleven species of butterfly have been recorded. |
| Vinters Valley Park | Vinters Valley Park | 30.2 hectares (75 acres) | Maidstone; 51.278°N 0.545°E; TQ 776 563 | Maidstone | | Map | Details | This park has diverse habitats with grassland, woods, marshes, scrub, a lake and a stream. Birds include ducks, geese and kingfishers. |
| Western Heights | Western Heights | 51.7 hectares (128 acres) | Dover; 51.117°N 1.296°E; TR 308 405 | Dover | | Map | Details | This green area surrounds Dover Western Heights, fortifications dating to the Napoleonic Wars. It consists of chalk meadows which provide a habitat for wild flowers, butterflies and birds. |
| Whinless Down | Whinless Down | 19.3 hectares (48 acres) | Dover; 51.127°N 1.280°E; TR 296 415 | Dover | | Map | Details | Dover Castle can be viewed from the down, which has rare plants such as cypress spurge, horseshoe vetch and crown vetch. There are also uncommon butterflies and moths. |
| Whitehall Meadows | Whitehall Meadows | 11.6 hectares (29 acres) | Canterbury; 51.276°N 1.065°E; TR 139 574 | Canterbury | | Map | Details | This wet meadow has typical damp loving wildlife including snails, butterflies, damselflies, dragonflies and reptiles. |

== See also ==
- List of Sites of Special Scientific Interest in Kent
- Kent Wildlife Trust

== Sources ==
- Ratcliffe, Derek, ed. (1977). A Nature Conservation Review. Vol. 2. Cambridge, UK: Cambridge University Press. ISBN 0-521-21403-3.
