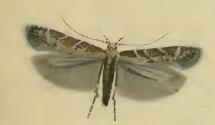

Scientific classification
- Kingdom: Animalia
- Phylum: Arthropoda
- Clade: Pancrustacea
- Class: Insecta
- Order: Lepidoptera
- Family: Gelechiidae
- Genus: Aristotelia
- Species: A. brizella

Binomial name
- Aristotelia brizella (Treitschke, 1833)

Synonyms
- Oecophora brizella Treitschke, 1833; Aristotelia brizelloides Amsel, 1935

= Aristotelia brizella =

Species of moth

Aristotelia brizella is a moth of the family Gelechiidae. It is found in most of Europe, except Ireland, Switzerland and most of the Balkan Peninsula. Outside of Europe, it is found in North Africa and the Near East.

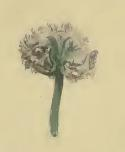
A flower head of Armeria maritima attacked by larva

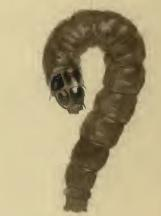
Larva

The wingspan is 10–12 mm. Adults are on wing from May to June and again from July to August in two generations per year.

The larvae feed on the seedheads of thrift (Armeria maritima) and sometimes common sea-lavender (Limonium vulgare).
