= Limonium maritimum =

Scientific classification
- Kingdom: Plantae
- Clade: Tracheophytes
- Clade: Angiosperms
- Clade: Eudicots
- Order: Caryophyllales
- Family: Plumbaginaceae
- Genus: Limonium
- Species: L. maritimum

Binomial name
- Limonium maritimum Caperta, Cortinhas, A.P.Paes, Guara, Esp.Santo & Erben

Species of flowering plant

Limonium maritimum is a species of Limonium from Portugal. It is similar to the closely related to Limonium vulgare and L. narbonense.
