= Southwood =

Southwood may refer to:

== Places ==
=== Australia ===
- Southwood, Queensland, a town and locality in the Western Downs Region

=== Canada ===
- Southwood, Calgary, a neighbourhood in Calgary, Alberta, Canada
- Southwood, Edmonton, Alberta
- Southwood, Ontario

=== United Kingdom ===
- Southwood, Derbyshire, a hamlet near Swadlincote
- Southwood, Hampshire, a suburb in Farnborough, Rushmoor
- Southwood, Norfolk
- Southwood, Somerset
- Southwood, Worcestershire, a location
- South Wood, a nature reserve in Hempstead, Kent
- South Hayling, Hampshire, formerly called "Southwood"

=== United States ===
- Southwood, Alabama, a place in Alabama
- SouthWood, Tallahassee, Florida, a planned community
- Southwood, Indiana, an unincorporated community
- Southwood, Louisiana, in Ascension Parish, Louisiana#Unincorporated communities
- Southwood, New York

== Education ==
- Southwood Boys Grammar School, an independent school in Ringwood, Victoria, Australia
- Southwood Middle School, a public school in Palmetto Bay, Florida, United States
- Southwood Secondary School, a Canadian high school in Cambridge, Ontario, Canada
- Southwood High School, a high school in Shreveport, Louisiana, United States

== Persons ==
- Richard Southwood, British ecologist
- Thomas Southwood Smith, English physician and sanitary reformer
- Nicholas Southwood, Australian philosopher
- Nick Southwood, British songwriter
