= Canterbury Oast Trust =

English charity

Coordinates: 51°4′28″N 0°47′39″E

Canterbury Oast Trust (COT) is a registered charity in England providing accommodation, care and training for people with learning disabilities, and autistic adults in Kent.

Its public site is the South of England Rare Breeds Centre at Woodchurch, near Ashford, Kent, which was set up to provide skills and training to people with learning disabilities. It is a working farm, and also operates as a tourist attraction. It chiefly comprises a farm, animal sanctuary, restaurant, plant nursery and art centre all providing occupational opportunities for people with learning difficulties.

Other sites are:

- Woodland management and woodcrafts businesses at Poulton Wood near Aldington, Kent

The South of England Rare Breeds Centre has displays of various farm animals, a children's petting barn, children's and toddlers play areas, discovery and wildlife gardens, walk through aviary and butterfly tunnel, woodland walks and the Granary Restaurant. Buildings from a Georgian farm (Yonsea Farm) are being re-located to the site as a preservation project. The Centre offers National Curriculum-based activities for visiting school groups. It is one of sixteen Rare Breeds Survival Trust approved farm parks, and features a variety of rare breeds. Sheep breeds include Manx Loaghtan, Jacobs, Lincoln Longwool, Wensleydales and Portlands; Pig breeds include Berkshires, British Lops, Gloucestershire Old Spots, Middle Whites and Tamworths; cattle include British Whites, Gloucesters and Beef Shorthorns; and there are also Bagot goats. Also located at the Centre is The Falcons Centre conference facility, which as well as providing for corporate meetings, is licensed for civil marriage ceremonies and caters for events such as banquets and dances. From 2008 the Centre will be the home of the annual Bilsington Craft Fair (28/29 June in 2008).

Poulton Wood is a 10.2-hectare (25-acre) coppiced woodland and Local Nature Reserve renowned for its bluebells. It has free public access. It adjoins Homelands, a listed building dating from the 17th century in Aldington which is used by the Canterbury Oast Trust as a residential building. The wood includes Ash, Hornbeam and Oak trees. Poulton Wood Works is run by the Trust to manage the woodland, and also produces craft products, wooden furniture and offers a local tree felling service.
