= Berkshire pig =

British breed of pig

Berkshire
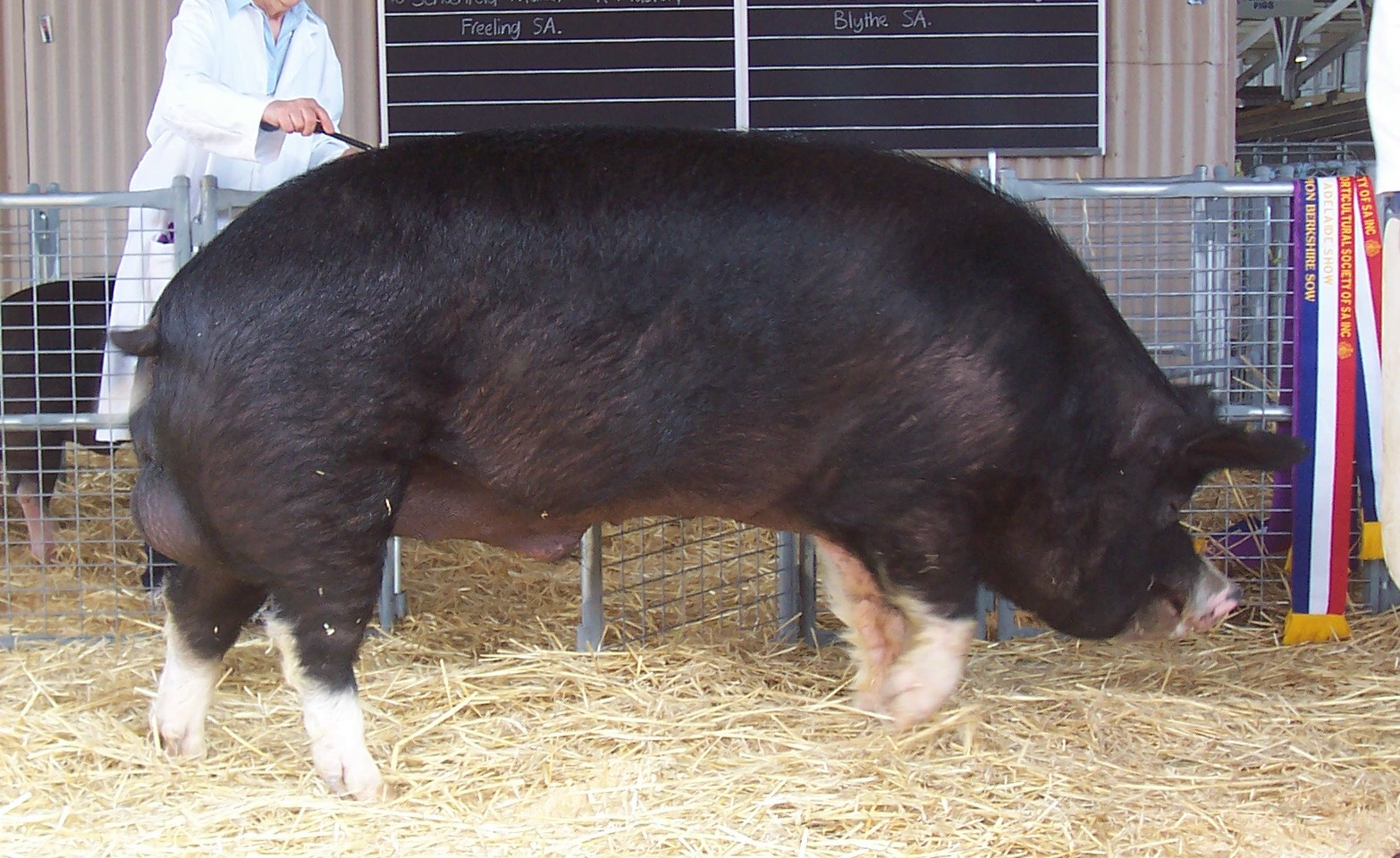
- Berkshire boar at the 2005 Royal Adelaide Show
- Conservation status: FAO (2007): not at risk; RBST (2011): at risk; RBST (2020): vulnerable
- Country of origin: United Kingdom
- Distribution: world-wide
- Use: meat

Traits
- Weight: Male: 280 kg; Female: 220 kg
- Skin colour: black
- Hair: black

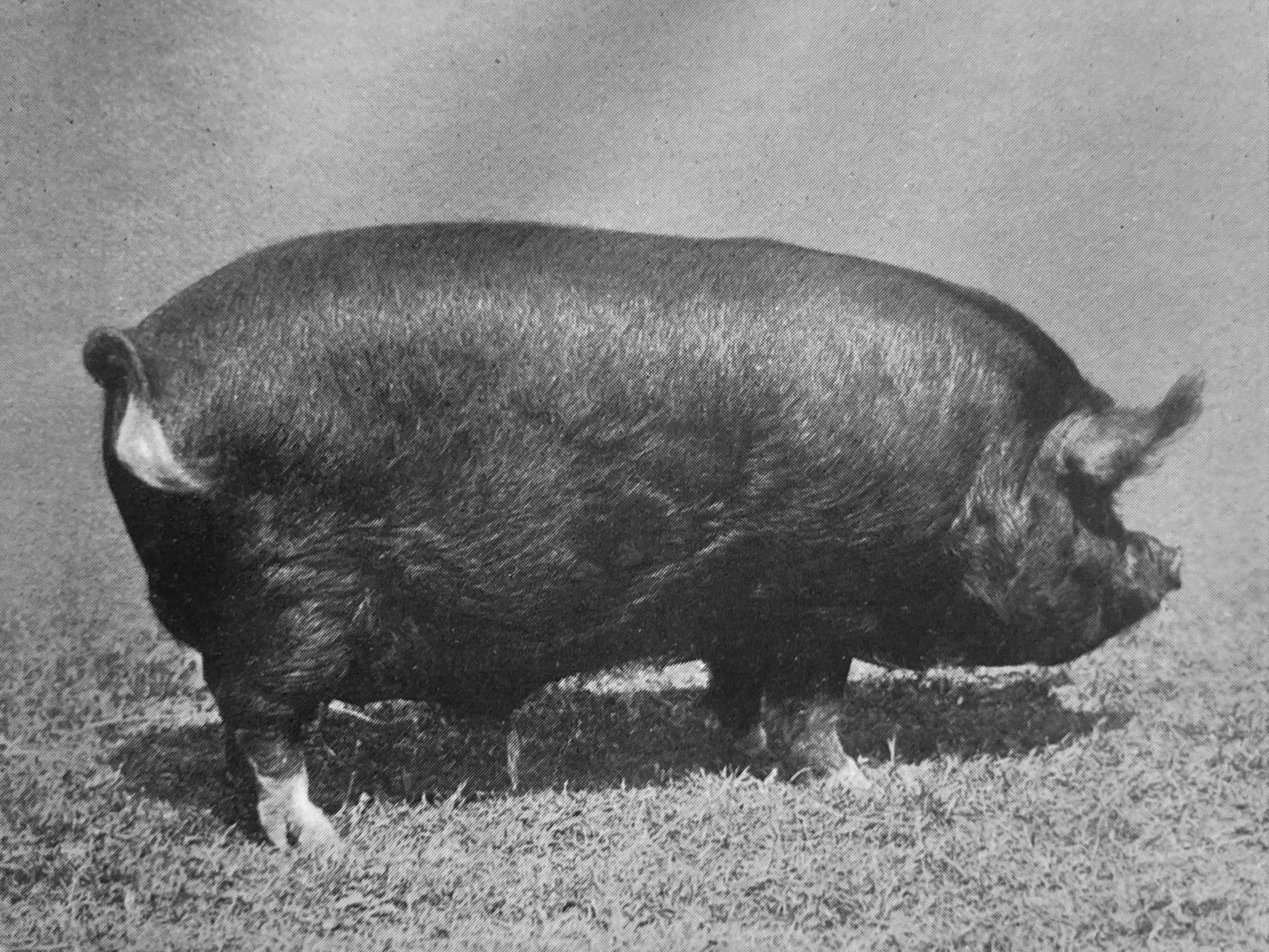
A boar, Encyclopædia Britannica, 1911

The Berkshire is a British breed of pig. It originated in the English county of Berkshire, for which it is named. It is normally black, with some white on the snout, on the lower legs, and on the tip of the tail.

It is a rare breed in the United Kingdom. It has been exported to a number of countries including Australia, Japan, New Zealand and the United States, and is numerous in some of them.

== History ==
The Berkshire is a traditional breed of the county of the same name. Until the eighteenth century it was a large tawny-coloured pig with lop ears, often with darker patches. In the late eighteenth and early nineteenth centuries it was substantially modified by cross-breeding with small black pigs imported from Asia.

Herds are maintained in England by the Rare Breeds Survival Trust at Aldenham Country Park in Hertfordshire and at the South of England Rare Breeds Centre in Kent. The Berkshire was listed as vulnerable in 2008; fewer than 300 breeding sows were known to exist at that time, but with the revived popularity of the breed through its connection to the Japanese marketing of a "wagyu for pork" connection, the numbers have increased.

The Berkshire has been exported to many countries, and has become numerous in some of them; it is reported to the DAD-IS database of the Food and Agriculture Organization of the United Nations by twenty-three countries, in the Americas, Asia, continental Europe and Oceania.

Exports to the United States began in the early nineteenth century. The American Berkshire Association, established in 1875, was the first breed society for a pig breed; the first pig registered was a boar named Ace of Spades, reportedly bred by Queen Victoria.

The pigs were exported to Japan in the 1860s, and became numerous there: in 2007 there were over 330000. The Japanese Kagoshima Berkshire, which apparently derives from two British Berkshire pigs imported to Japan in the 1930s, is considered a separate breed; the meat may be marketed as Kurobuta pork, and can command a premium price.

== Characteristics ==
The Berkshire is of medium size: adult boars weigh about 280 kg (600 lb), sows some 220 kg (500 lb). It is black with six white markings: four white socks, a white splash on the snout, and a white tip to the tail. It is prick-eared.

== Use ==
The Berkshire is reared for pork. Although the meat has a relatively low pH, and high pH is normally correlated with consumer satisfaction, Berkshire pork was highly rated in taste tests in the United States.

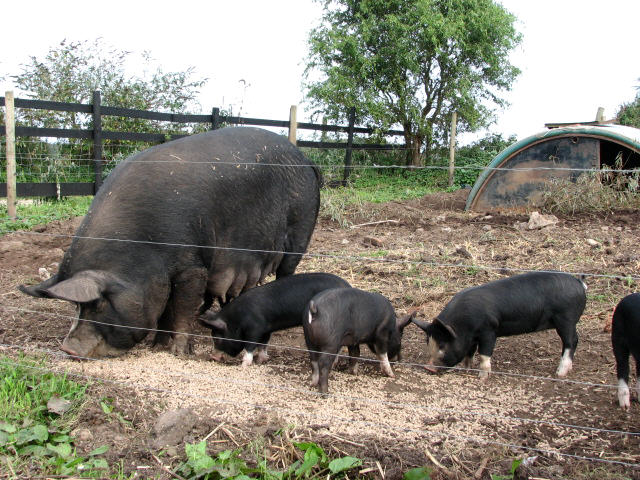
Near Calthorpe Broad, in Norfolk

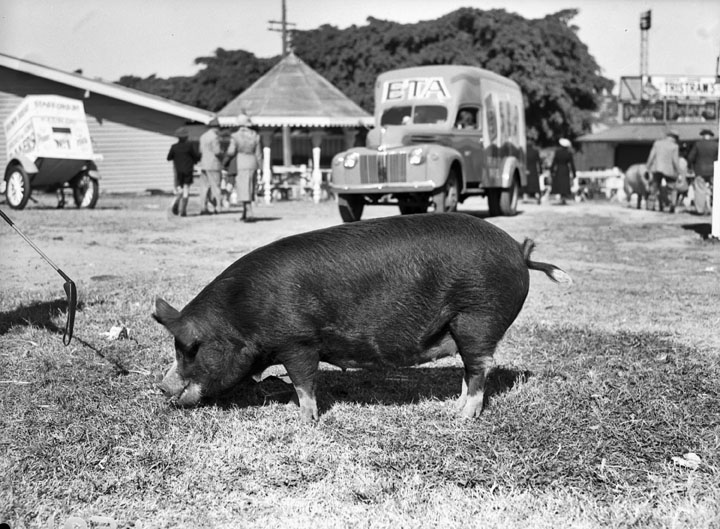
Champion sow, Queensland, 1951

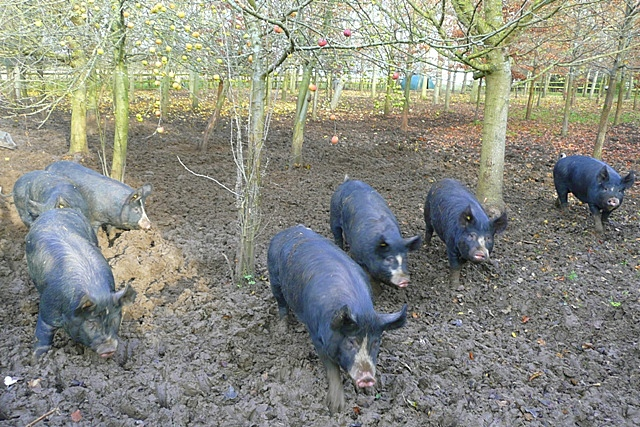
At North Standen, in Berkshire
