= South Swale =

Nature reserve in Kent, England

Coordinates: 51.35°N 0.938°E

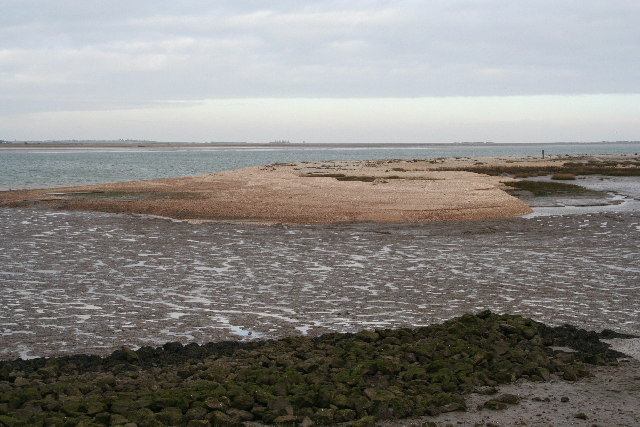
- Interactive map of South Swale
- Type: Local Nature Reserve
- Location: Faversham, Kent
- OS grid: TR 047 653
- Area: 410.5 hectares (1,014 acres)
- Manager: Kent Wildlife Trust

South Swale is a 410.5-hectare (1,014-acre) Local Nature Reserve (as South Bank of the Swale) north of Faversham in Kent. It is owned by Kent County Council and managed by Kent Wildlife Trust. It is part of The Swale Ramsar site, Special Protection Area and Site of Special Scientific Interest

This coastal site has wetland and grassland, with mudflats which attract a large population of waders and wildfowl in winter. Flora include Yellow horned-popies, sea-lavender, golden samphires and wild carrots.

The Saxon Shore Way public footpath follows the top of the sea wall for the entire length of the reserve, around the village of Graveney, for about 3 miles in total.

== See also ==
- Oare Marshes - across Faversham Creek from South Swale
