= Kagoshima Berkshire =

Japanese breed of pig

- Conservation status: FAO (2007): not at risk
- Country of origin: Japan
- Distribution: Kagoshima prefecture
- Use: meat

Traits
- Skin colour: black
- Hair: black

The Kagoshima Berkshire (Japanese: かごしま黒豚, kagoshima kurobuta) is a Japanese breed of domestic pig found in Kagoshima prefecture in south-western Japan. It derives from the Berkshire breed of pig of the United Kingdom, which was imported to Japan from the 1860s and is now widespread there. The Kagoshima Berkshire apparently descends from two British Berkshire pigs brought to Japan in the 1930s. Meat from this breed may be marketed under the brand name "Kurobuta", meaning "black pig". Pork from Kagoshima Berkshire pigs constitutes approximately 2% of the total annual production in Japan. The meat is considered tender and flavoursome; it is a premium product, in demand throughout the country.

== History ==
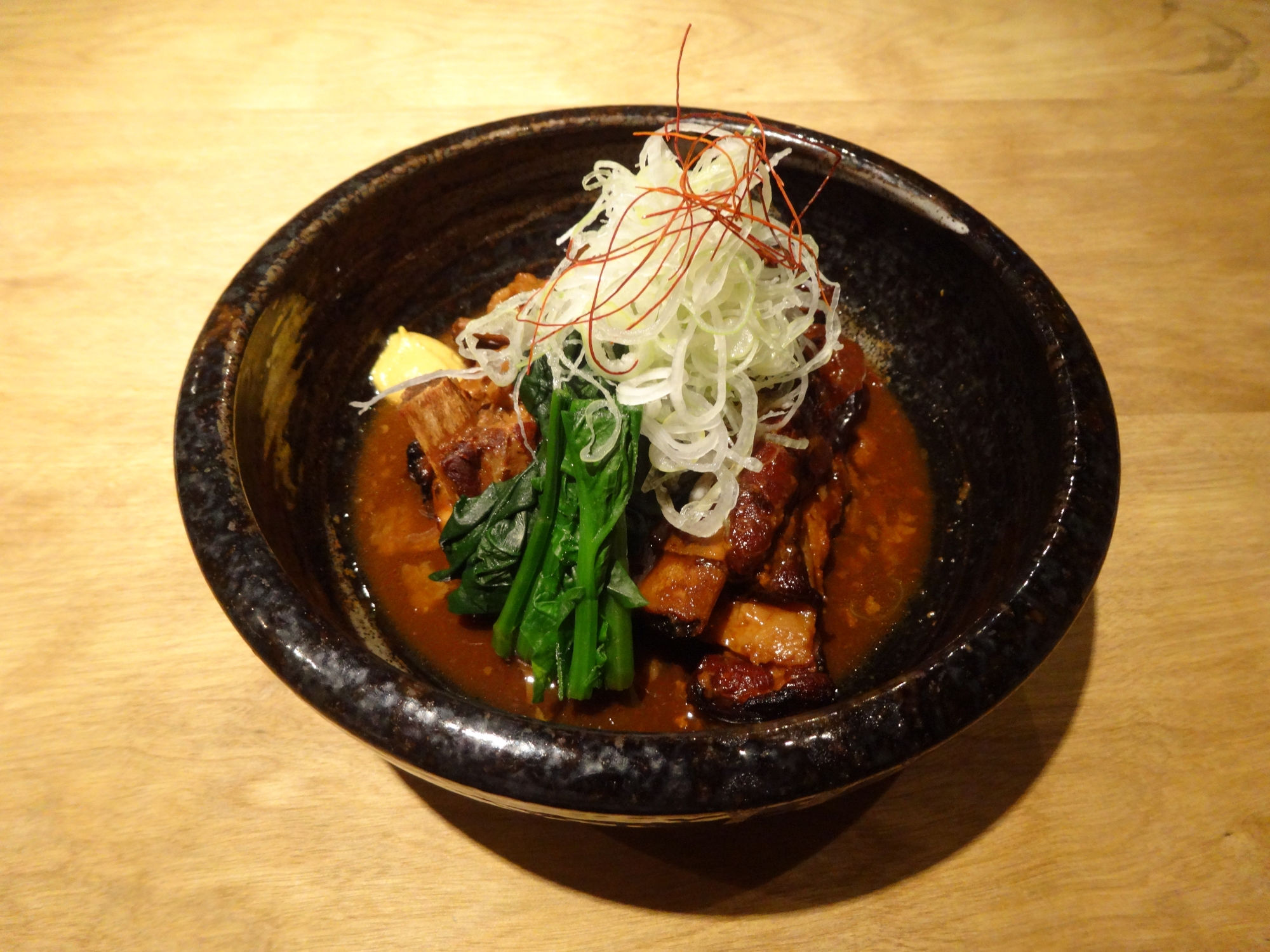
Kagoshima pork bones, grilled and braised with vegetables

Until about the time of the Meiji Restoration in 1868, meat was rarely eaten in Japan, for cultural, economic, and religious reasons. British Berkshire pigs were imported to the former Kagoshima Domain, now Kagoshima Prefecture, from the 1860s onwards and are still numerous there.

The Kagoshima Berkshire is regarded as a distinct breed, and apparently descends from two British Berkshire pigs brought to the country in the 1930s. It is reared only in Kagoshima Prefecture in southwestern Japan. In the latter twentieth century, competition from productive foreign breeds led to a decline in production. In 1961 almost all the pigs in the prefecture, some 240000, were of the Kagoshima Berkshire breed; by 1965 the number had fallen to 213000, or about 83% of the total, and by 1975 to 12600, or 1.6% of the total pig population. Numbers have since increased; in 2000 there were over 278000 of the breed, constituting 13.6% of the total number of pigs in the prefecture.

In 2007 there were 215000 Kagoshima Berkshire; there were also some 330000 "English" Berkshire pigs in the whole country.
