= Whinless Down =

Nature reserve in Kent, England

Coordinates: 51.127°N 1.280°E

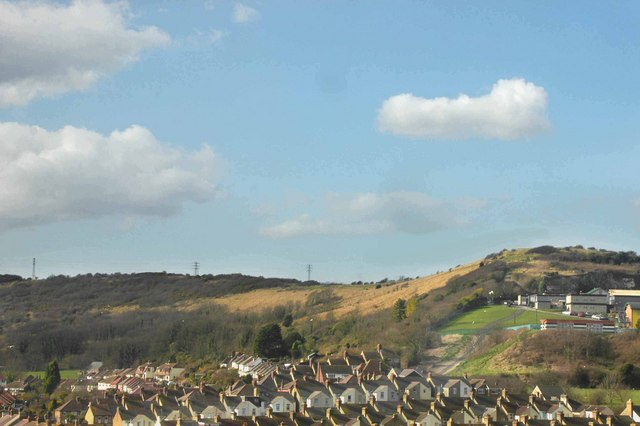
- Interactive map of Whinless Down
- Type: Local Nature Reserve
- Location: Dover, Kent
- OS grid: TR 296 415
- Area: 19.3 hectares (48 acres)
- Manager: The White Cliffs Countryside Partnership

Whinless Down is a 19.3-hectare (48-acre) Local Nature Reserve on the western outskirts of Dover, Kent. It is owned by Dover District Council and managed by the White Cliffs Countryside Partnership.

Dover Castle can be viewed from the down, which has rare plants such as cypress spurge, horseshoe vetch and crown vetch. There are also uncommon butterflies and moths including Adonis blue, Chalkhill blue, Scarce forester moth and Silver spotted skipper.

There is access by a footpath from Kings Road and paths leading from behind Elms Vale Recreation Ground, There is also access via High Meadow and the adjoining Nemo Down.

Whinless Down, High Meadow and Nemo Down together form a network of pathways covering an area of over 60.7-hectare (150 acres).
