= Ashford Community Woodland =

Nature reserve in Kent, United Kingdom

Coordinates: 51.136°N 0.834°E

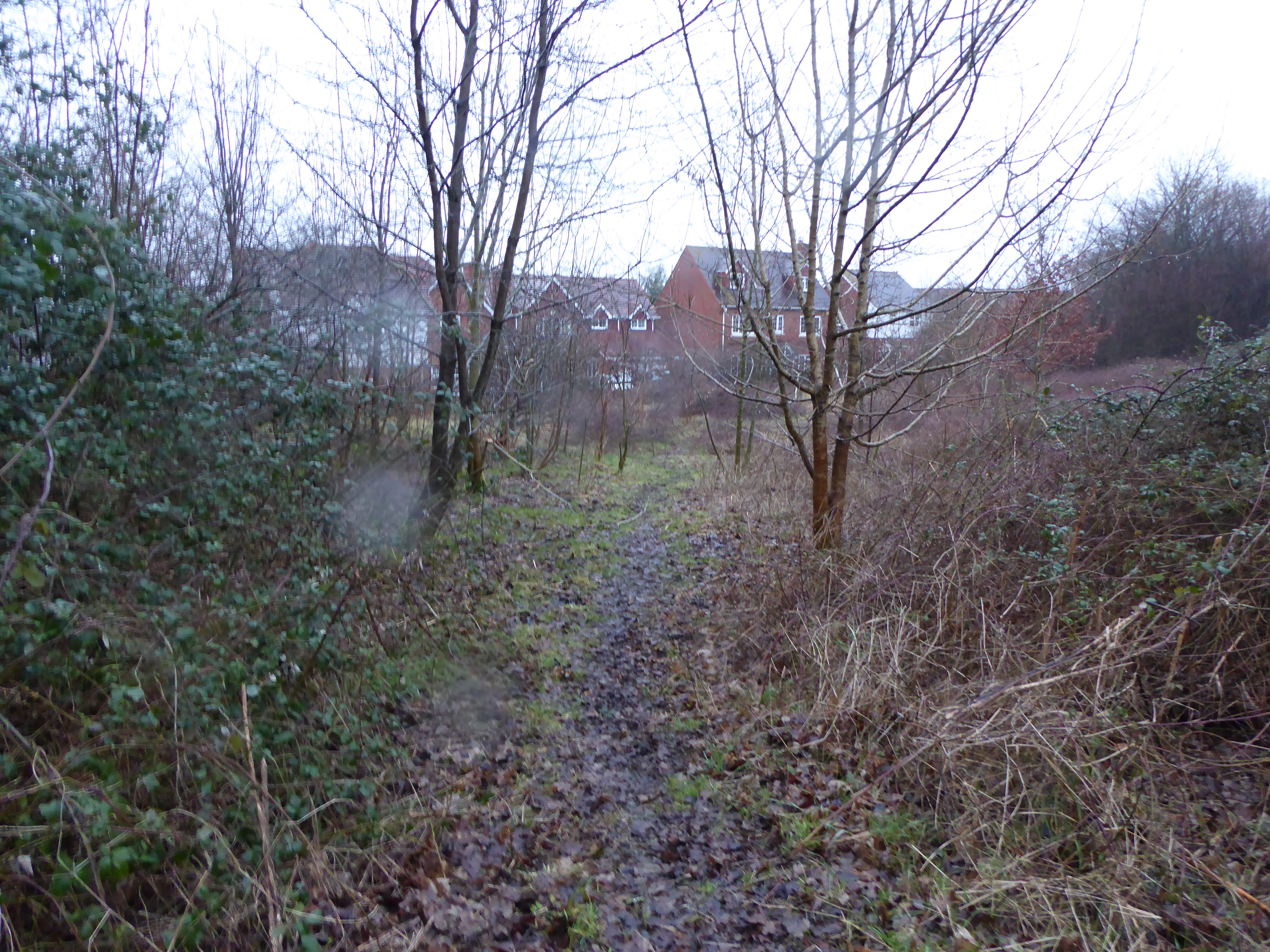
- Interactive map of Ashford Community Woodland
- Type: Local Nature Reserve
- Location: Ashford, Kent
- OS grid: TQ 984 412
- Area: 13.8 hectares (34 acres)
- Manager: Ashford Borough Council

Ashford Community Woodland is a 13.8-hectare (34-acre) Local Nature Reserve on the western outskirts of Ashford in Kent. It is owned and managed by Ashford Borough Council.

Most of this broadleaf was planted in 1985, and there is also rough grassland and scrub. Birds include the endangered skylark and yellowhammer and there butterflies such as marbled whites and small skippers.

There is access from roads including Bucksford Lane.
