= No Man's Orchard =

Nature reserve in Kent, England

Coordinates: 51.275°N 1.021°E

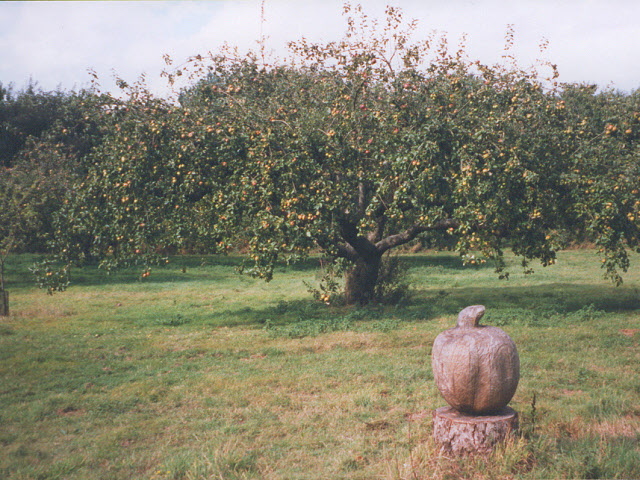
- Interactive map of No Man's Orchard
- Type: Local Nature Reserve
- Location: Canterbury, Kent
- OS grid: TR 108 572
- Area: 4.1 hectares (10 acres)
- Manager: Kentish Stour Countryside Partnership

No Man's Orchard is a 4.1-hectare (10-acre) Local Nature Reserve west of Canterbury in Kent. It is owned by Chartham and Harbledown Parish Councils and managed by the Kentish Stour Countryside Partnership.

"No man's land" is an area which straddles two areas of ownership, in this case the boundary between the parishes of Chartham and Harbledown. It is one of the few remaining traditional orchards in the Stour Valley.

There is access by a footpath from Bigbury Road.
