= Foal Hurst Wood =

Nature reserve in Kent, United Kingdom

Coordinates: 51.172°N 0.373°E

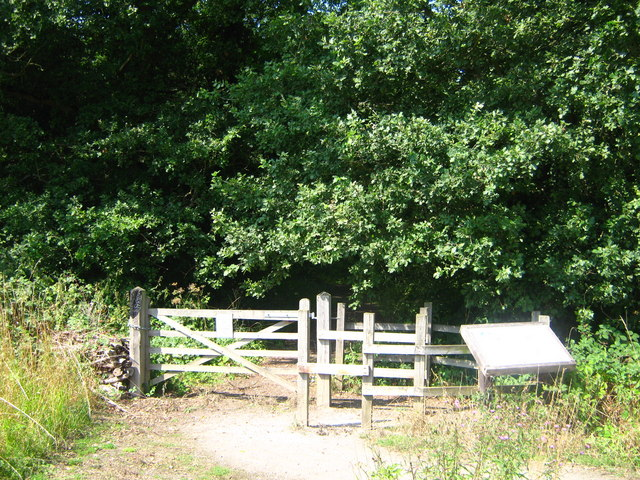
- Interactive map of Foal Hurst Wood
- Type: Local Nature Reserve
- Location: Paddock Wood, Kent
- OS grid: TQ 660 441
- Area: 12.9 hectares (32 acres)
- Manager: Paddock Wood Town Council

Foal Hurst Wood is a 12.9-hectare (32-acre) Local Nature Reserve on the south-western outskirts of Paddock Wood in Kent. It is owned by Tunbridge Wells Borough Council and managed by Paddock Wood Town Council.

This site is mainly coppiced woodland and there is grassland at the northern end. Birds include green and great spotted woodpeckers, and there are flora such as orchids.

There is access from Badsell Road.
