= Boxley Warren =

Nature reserve in Kent, England

Coordinates: 51.315°N 0.527°E

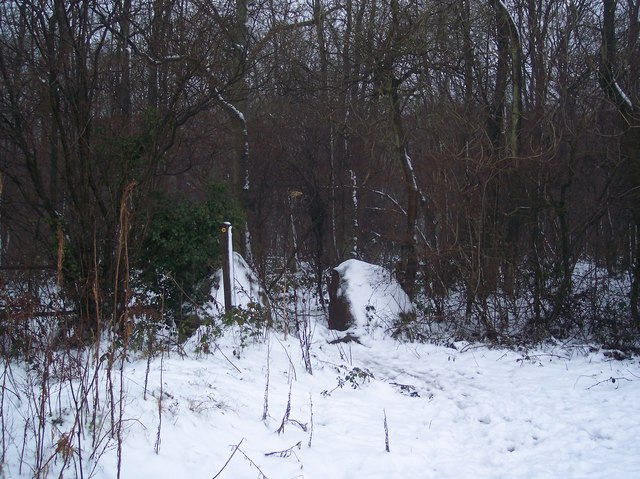
- Interactive map of Boxley Warren
- Type: Local Nature Reserve
- Location: Maidstone, Kent
- OS grid: TQ 762 603
- Area: 83.0 hectares (205 acres)
- Manager: Maidstone Borough Council

Boxley Warren is an 83-hectare (210-acre) Local Nature Reserve north of Maidstone in Kent. It is privately owned and managed by Maidstone Borough Council. It is part of North Downs Woodlands Special Area of Conservation and Wouldham to Detling Escarpment Site of Special Scientific Interest

This site is yew woodland with diverse fauna and flora. It includes the White Horse Stone, a Neolithic standing stone which is a Scheduled Monument.

There is access from the North Downs Way.
