= Jumping Downs =

Kent nature reserve

Coordinates: 51.194°N 1.136°E

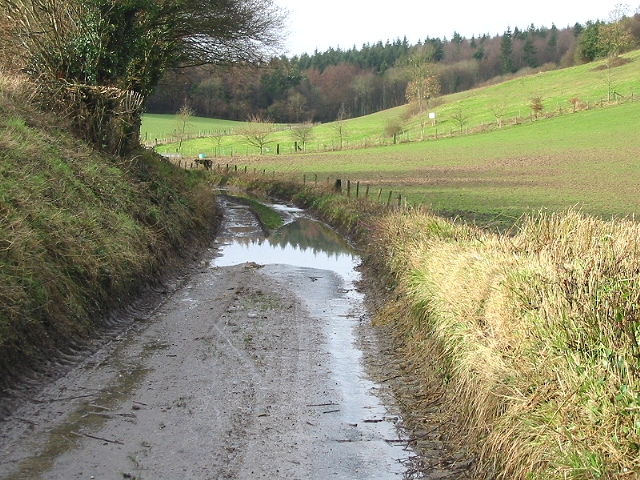
- Interactive map of Jumping Downs
- Type: Local Nature Reserve
- Location: Aylesham, Kent
- OS grid: TR 192 485
- Area: 5.7 hectares (14 acres)
- Manager: Jumping Downs Trust and Kentish Stour Community Partnership

Jumping Downs is a 5.7-hectare (14-acre) Local Nature Reserve near Aylesham, between Canterbury and Dover in Kent. It is owned by the Jumping Downs Trust and managed by the Trust and the Kentish Stour Community Partnership.

Adders, viviparous lizards and slow worms have been recorded on this chalk downland site. Mammals include wood mice and pygmy shrews.

There is access from South Barham Hill.
