= Oare Marshes =

Local Nature Reserve in Kent, England

Coordinates: 51.344°N 0.886°E

- Interactive map of Oare Marshes
- Type: Local Nature Reserve
- Location: Faversham, Kent
- OS grid: TR 011 645
- Area: 71.4 hectares (176 acres)
- Manager: Kent Wildlife Trust

Oare Marshes is a 71.4-hectare (176-acre) Local Nature Reserve north of Faversham in Kent, England. It is owned and managed by Kent Wildlife Trust. It is part of The Swale Nature Conservation Review site, Grade I, National Nature Reserve, Ramsar internationally important wetland site, Special Protection Area under the European Union Directive on the Conservation of Wild Birds, and Site of Special Scientific Interest.

== Access ==
Car parking is provided opposite the Watch House, near the sea wall at the end of the Harty Ferry Road. Access is restricted to the public footpath and nature trail to minimise disturbance to roosting, feeding and breeding birds. The whole reserve may be observed from the nature trail and viewing hides. For those who need to use a car or wheelchair, there is a disabled only car park 300m from the hide overlooking the east flood. This hide is wheelchair accessible, and reached along firm level paths. There is also good viewing from the road itself, especially over the east flood. A nature trail leaflet is available on request.

== History ==
The marshes are historically tied to boatbuilding and fishing from the nearby Oare village. Along the shores, Oyster dredging was carried. Earliest documented evidence goes back 1591 and later in 1608 where the boundaries of the oyster fisheries were surveyed. According to 'The History of Faversham' by Edward Jacob, oysters were a staple to the locals. However, after World War II the fishery ceased operation and the grounds leased to the Seasalter and Ham Oyster Fishery Company. Kent Wildlife Trust leased and managed Oare Marshes from Tarmac, who transferred the deeds over in 1984. In 2009, a clause in the contract allowed the Kent Wildlife Trust to purchase the freehold after 25 years. On October 2012 , scences for the Channel 4 television show Southcliffe were filmed at the Oare Marshes.

== Points of interest ==
Following along the creek leads to small shipwrecks and mudflats. The shipwrecks include the boat of an English merchant, Charles Little, who sank after a explosion in 1888. Another of the shipwrecks dates back 1672 to a cargo ship coming from France to transport wine. Many of the wreckes remain unidentified. On the corner of the marshes is Sea Wall Hide. Found along the water is an artesian well, one of the handful drilled for explosives factories. Inland is the 12th-century Luddenham Church.

== Flora ==
Teasle heads (Dipsacus fullonum) at Oare Marshes

As one of the last grazing marshes left in Kent. The flat land of the reserve consists of over 81 hectares of marsh with freshwater dykes, open water 'scrapes', seawall and saltmarsh on the mainland opposite the Isle of Sheppey.

The plants found are typical of salt marshes. Listed on the RSPB website, some of the flora include common reed, lesser reedmace, great water dock and lesser water‑parsnip. Common halophytes such as purslane, sea lavender, sea clover and golden samphire are found along the shore. However, Spartina anglica has become overly dominant and threatens the surrounding salt marsh species, this is most apparent along the west of Harty Ferry.

== Birds ==
Short-eared Owl Asio flammeus, Oare Marshes Nature Reserve, Kent.

The reserve is of international importance for migratory, overwintering and breeding wetland birds. It is estimated there are around 250 unique bird species. Winter and Autumn are considered the best seasons for finding birds.

Suitable habitat is achieved through manipulation of water levels and livestock grazing. All year-round bird species are the barn owl, corn bunting, little owl, little egret and common ringed plover. In the summer, it is common to find birds such as the common tern, garganey, little ringed plover, little tern, sedge warbler and european turtle dove.

During the winter the profile changes, including but not limited to, brent Goose, black-tailed Godwit, curlew sandpiper, green sandpiper, grey plover, hen harrier, merlin, red-breasted merganser, european rock pipit and short-eared owl. By the spring, there are birds such as the bearded reedling. The autumn has a handful of warblers and passing migrants like the common greenshank.

== See also ==
- South Swale nature reserve - covers the marshes east of Faversham
