= Barnett's Wood =

Nature reserve in the United Kingdom

Coordinates: 51.158°N 0.278°E

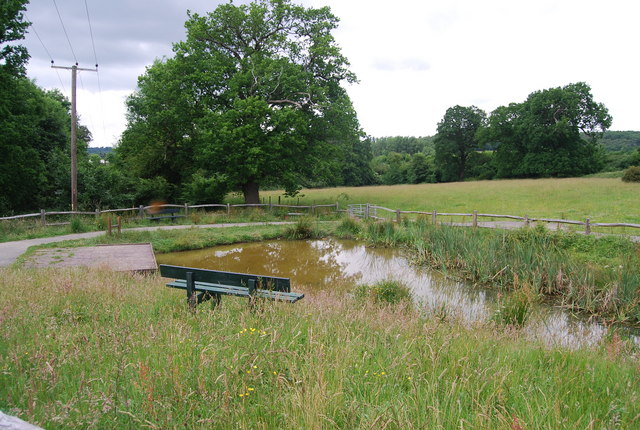
- Interactive map of Barnett's Wood
- Type: Local Nature Reserve
- Location: Tunbridge Wells, Kent
- OS grid: TQ 594 423
- Area: 12.4 hectares (31 acres)
- Manager: Kent High Weald Project and the Friends of Barnett’s Wood

Barnett's Wood is a 12.4-hectare (31-acre) Local Nature Reserve in Southborough, on the northern outskirts of Tunbridge Wells in Kent. It is owned by Tunbridge Wells Borough Council and managed by Kent High Weald Project and the Friends of Barnett’s Wood.

This site has ancient, semi-natural woodland and unimproved grassland. The meadows are grazed by cattle, and wildflowers include bird's-foot trefoil, common spotted orchid, cuckooflower, sneezewort, oxeye daisy and common knapweed.

There is access from Juniper Close.
