= Crane Valley =

Park in Kent, United Kingdom

Coordinates: 51.093°N 0.532°E

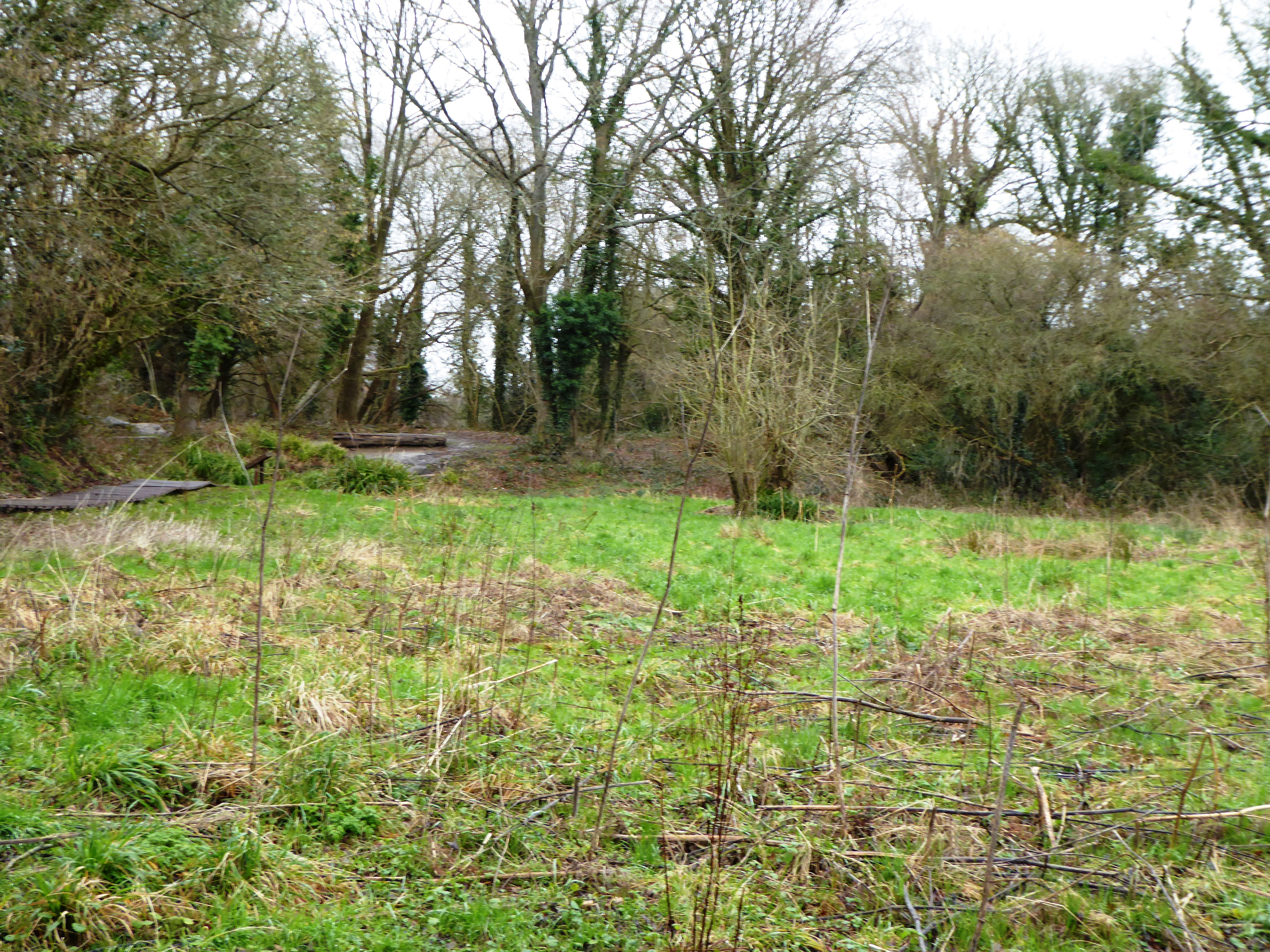
- Interactive map of Crane Valley
- Type: Local Nature Reserve
- Location: Cranbrook, Kent
- OS grid: TQ 774 357
- Area: 1.8 hectares (4.4 acres)
- Manager: Tunbridge Wells Borough Council

Crane Valley is a 0.8-hectare (2.0-acre) Local Nature Reserve in Cranbrook in Kent. It is owned and managed by Tunbridge Wells Borough Council.

Much of this site is wet woodland with lush vegetation, including the locally rare large bitter-cress. There is semi-natural woodland in drier areas, with oak, hornbeam and field maple.

There is access from the park north-east of the site.
