= Curtis Wood =

Nature reserve in Kent, England

Coordinates: 51.345°N 1.127°E

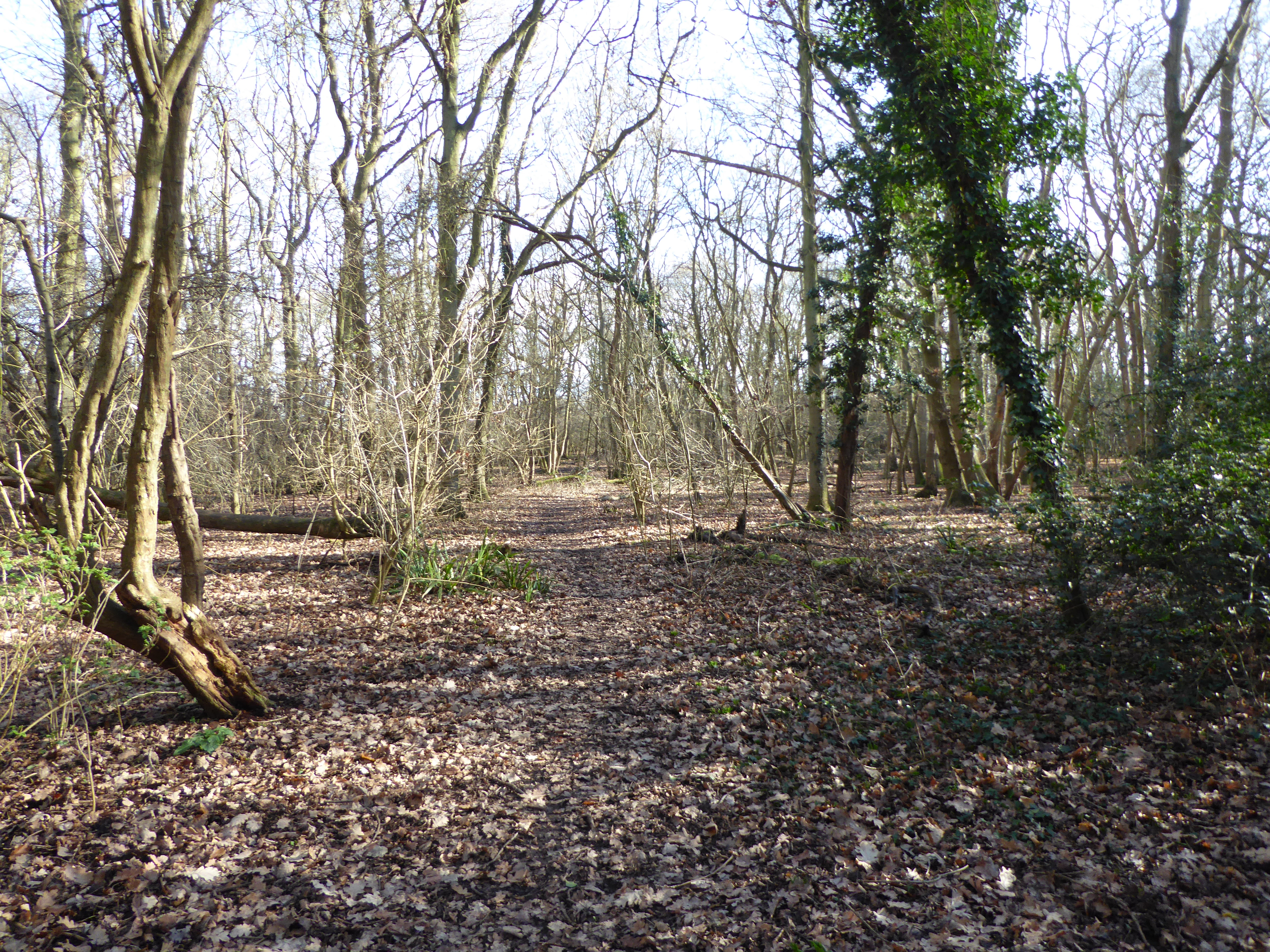
- Interactive map of Curtis Wood
- Type: Local Nature Reserve
- Location: Herne, Kent
- OS grid: TR 179 653
- Area: 5.3 hectares (13 acres)
- Manager: Canterbury City Council

Curtis Wood is a 5.3-hectare (13-acre) Local Nature Reserve in Herne in Kent. It is owned and managed by Canterbury City Council.

This wood has diverse ground flora including early purple and greater butterfly orchids. There is also a semi-improved meadow.

There is access from Canterbury Road.
