= Ashford Green Corridors =

Nature reserve in Kent, England

Coordinates: 51.141°N 0.875°E

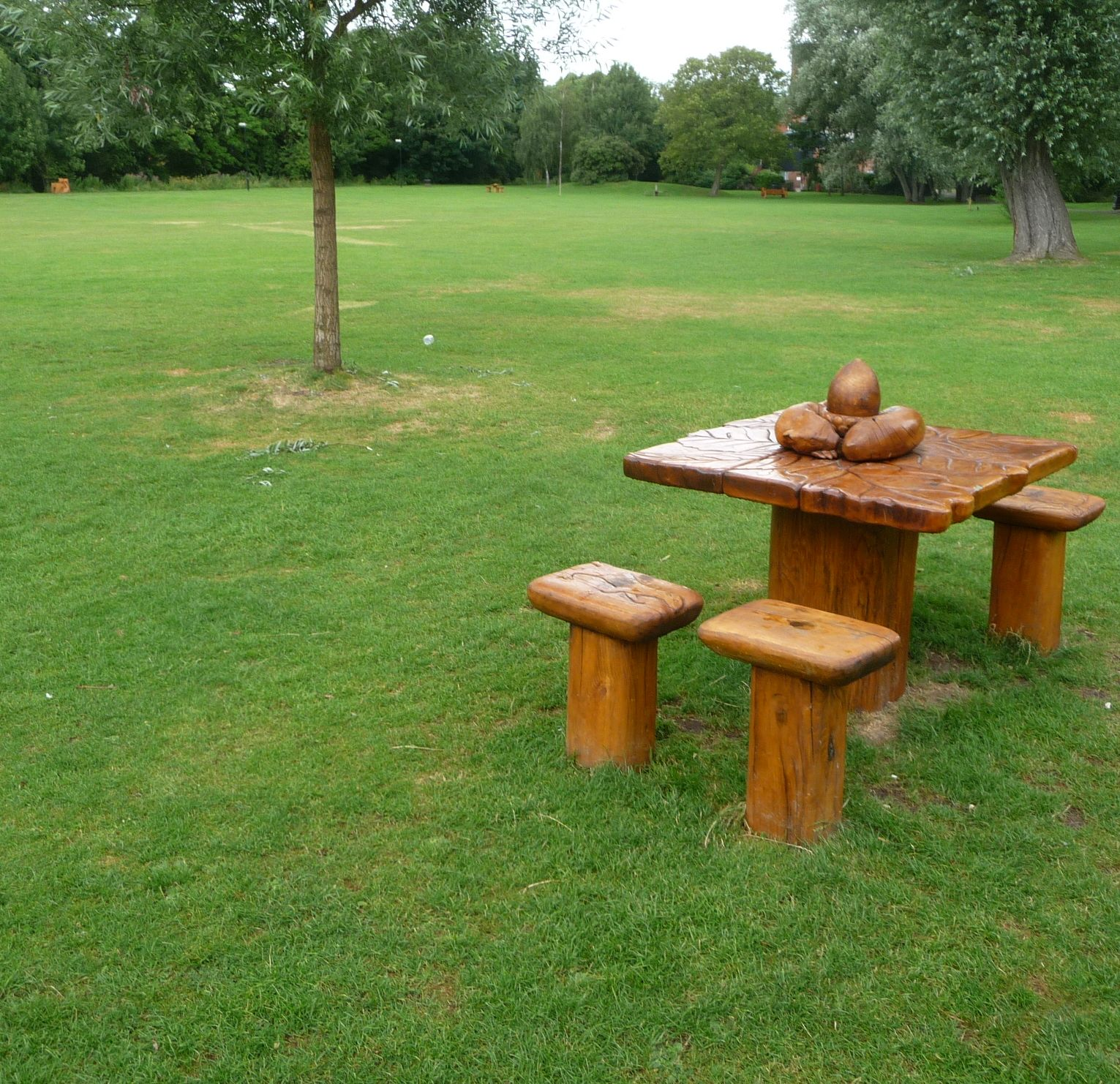
- Interactive map of Ashford Green Corridors
- Type: Local Nature Reserve
- Location: Ashford, Kent
- OS grid: TR 012 419
- Area: 47.4 hectares (117 acres)
- Manager: Ashford Borough Council

Ashford Green Corridors is a 47.4-hectare (117-acre) Local Nature Reserve in Ashford in Kent, England. It is owned and managed by Ashford Borough Council.

This site has a lake, ponds, pollarded trees, a meadow and parkland. Birds on Singleton Lake include kingfishers.

Paths and roads go through this linear site.
