= Levan Strice =

Nature Reserve woodland area in Kent, England

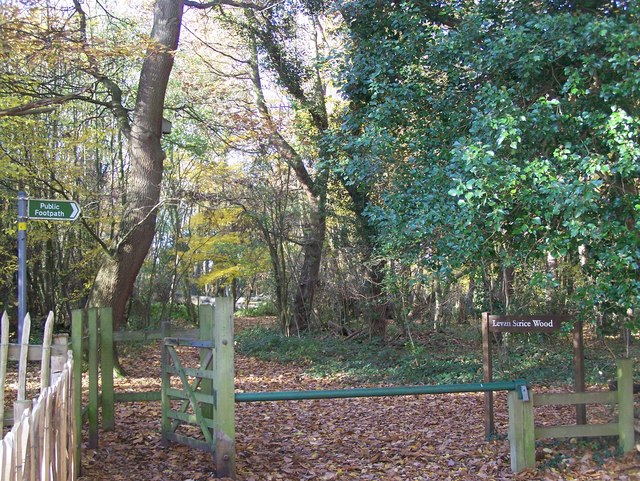
- Entrance via Thanet Road (Eastern Entrance)
- Interactive map of Levan Strice
- Type: Local Nature Reserve
- Location: Wigmore, Kent, England
- OS grid: TQ 802 637
- Coordinates: 51.344°N 0.586°E
- Area: 2.8 hectares (6.9 acres)
- Manager: Medway Council

Levan Strice is a 2.8-hectare (6.9-acre) Local Nature Reserve in Wigmore in Kent. It consists mostly of woodland with public access trails. It is owned and managed by Medway Council. This site has ancient woodland; the main habitat is coppice woodland. There is access to the site from both Thanet Road (off Maidstone Road, Wigmore) and via a rear gate inside the car park at Wigmore Library.

The woodland area is bordered by urban development, although it is home to a spectrum of British fauna (including foxes and various birds) and flora. A large number of bluebells bloom in the spring months and make up a carpet of dense woodland floor, making it a popular bluebell wood walking route for families and locals.
