= Western Heights LNR =

Nature reserve in Kent, England

Coordinates: 51.117°N 1.296°E

Western Heights
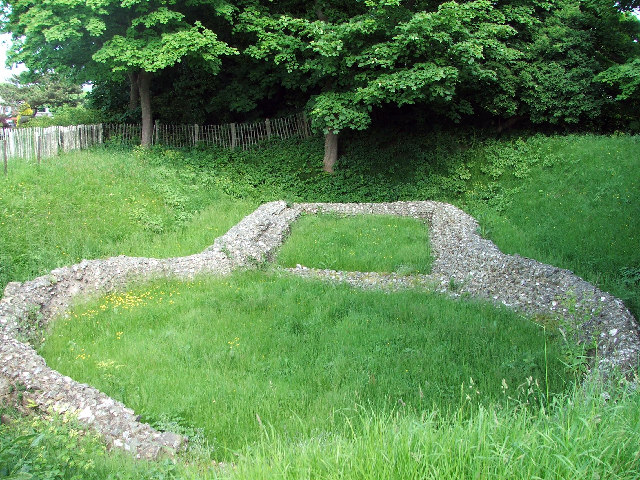
- Interactive map of Western Heights
- Type: Local Nature Reserve
- Location: Dover, Kent
- OS grid: TR 308 405
- Area: 51.7 hectares (128 acres)
- Manager: The White Cliffs Countryside Partnership

Western Heights is a 51.7-hectare (128-acre) Local Nature Reserve in Dover in Kent. It is owned by Dover Town Council and managed by the White Cliffs Countryside Partnership.

This green area surrounds Dover Western Heights, fortifications dating to the Napoleonic Wars. It consists of chalk meadows which provide a habitat for wild flowers, butterflies and birds.

There is access from South Military Road.
