= Nemo Down =

Nature reserve in Dover, Kent, England

Coordinates: 51.13°N 1.276°E

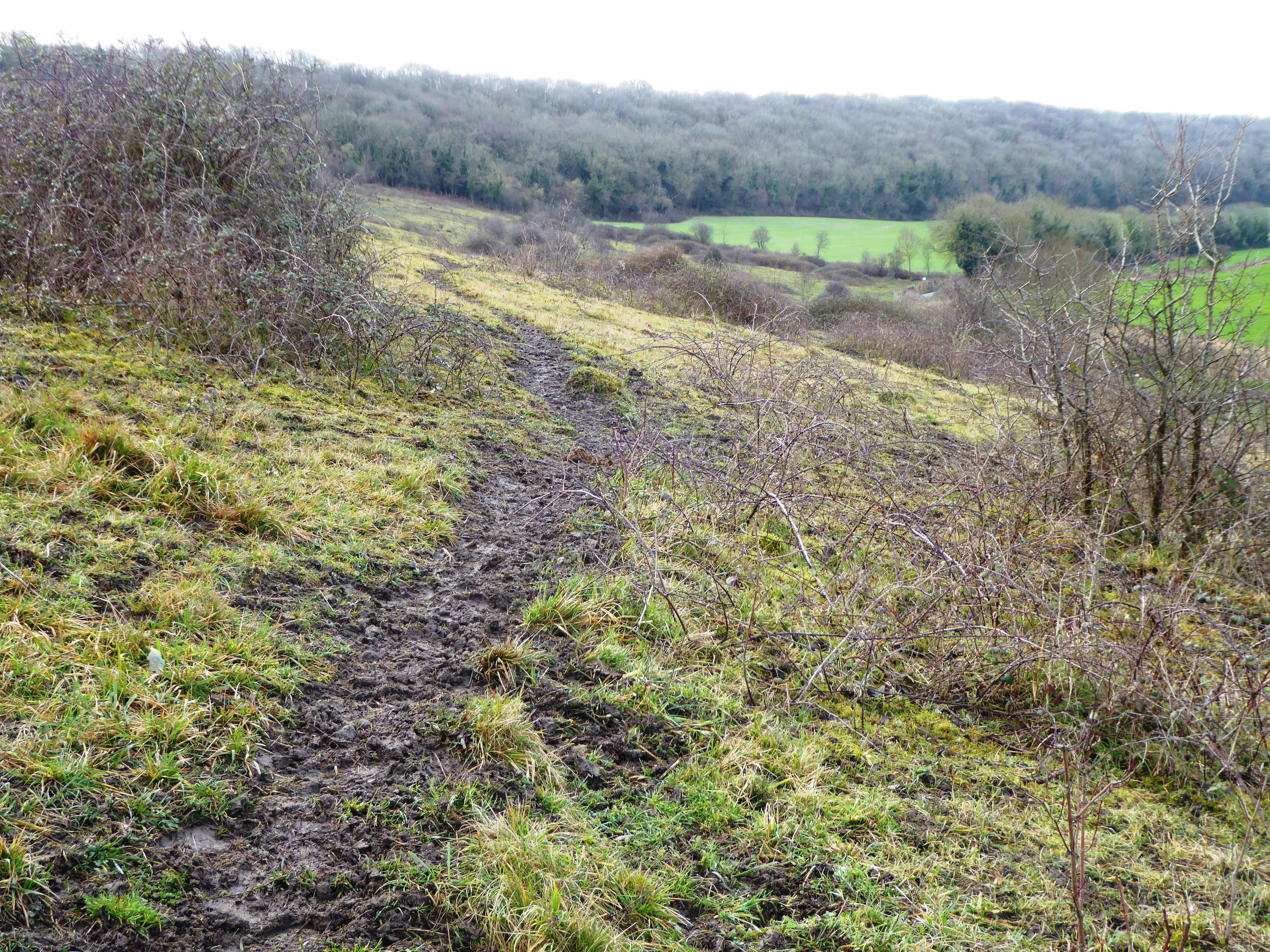
- Interactive map of Nemo Down
- Type: Nature reserve
- Location: Dover, Kent
- OS grid: TR 293 419
- Area: 21 hectares (50 acres)

Nemo Down is a 21-hectare (50-acre) nature reserve on the western outskirts of Dover in Kent. It was shown as owned and managed by the Kent Wildlife Trust until 2018.

This site has chalk grassland, scrub and woodland. There is a diverse range of plants including pyramidal orchids and wood anemones, and butterflies such as the marbled white and wall brown.

There is access, which can be very muddy, on Coombe Road.
