= Whitehall Meadows =

Park in United Kingdom

Coordinates: 51.276°N 1.065°E

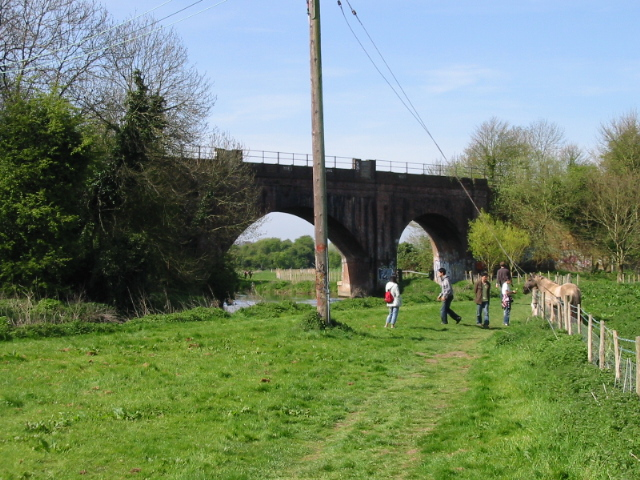
- Interactive map of Whitehall Meadows
- Type: Local Nature Reserve
- Location: Canterbury, Kent
- OS grid: TR 139 574
- Area: 11.6 hectares (29 acres)
- Manager: Canterbury City Council

Whitehall Meadows is a 11.6-hectare (29-acre) Local Nature Reserve in Canterbury in Kent. It is owned and managed by Canterbury City Council.

This wet meadow has typical damp-loving wildlife including snails, butterflies, damselflies, dragonflies and reptiles.

This site is divided into two halves, with the River Great Stour running between them. A cycle path runs through the northern part.
