= Poulton Wood =

Nature reserve in Kent, England

Coordinates: 51.09°N 0.937°E

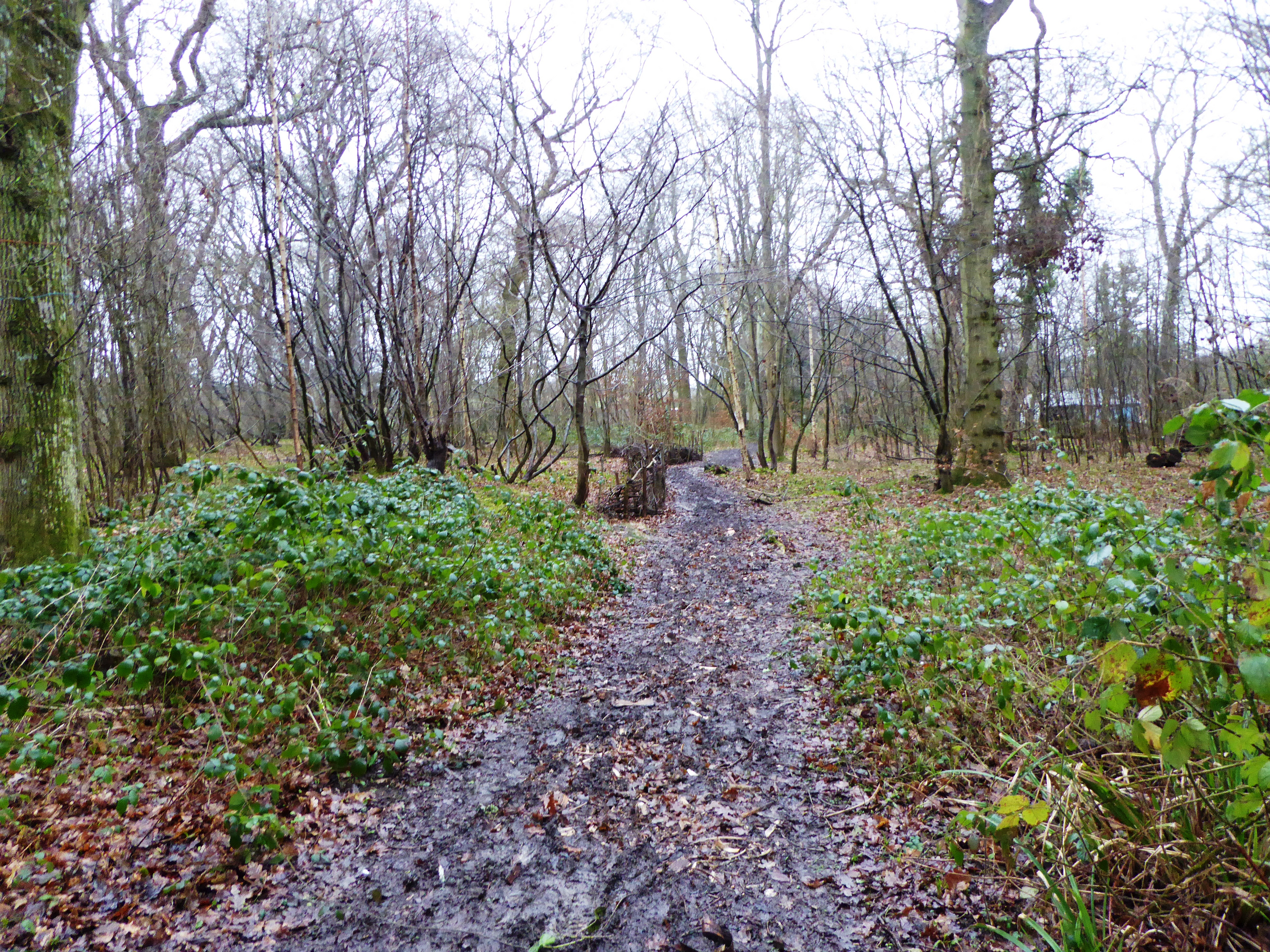
- Interactive map of Poulton Wood
- Type: Local Nature Reserve
- Location: Aldington, Kent
- OS grid: TR 058 364
- Area: 10.2 hectares (25 acres)
- Manager: Canterbury Oast Trust

Poulton Wood is a 10.2-hectare (25-acre) Local Nature Reserve in Aldington, south-east of Ashford in Kent. It is owned and managed by Canterbury Oast Trust.

This is a woodland of coppiced oak, hornbeam and ash, and spring flowers include bluebells. It is managed as a conservation project providing training in subjects such as coppice management and woodcrafts.

There is access from Forge Hill.
