= Larkey Valley Wood =

Woodland in Kent, England

Coordinates: 51.257°N 1.044°E

- Site of Special Scientific Interest
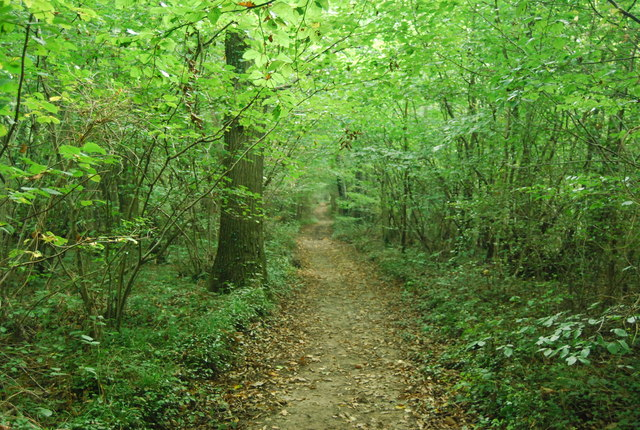
- Location of Larkey Valley Wood.
- Area of search: Kent
- Grid reference: TR 125 553
- Interest: Biological
- Area: 44.1 hectares (109 acres)
- Notification date: 1985
- Location map: Magic Map

Larkey Valley Wood is a 44.1-hectare (109-acre) biological Site of Special Scientific Interest south of Canterbury in Kent. It is also a Local Nature Reserve and it is owned and managed by Canterbury City Council.

This wood has diverse ground flora with some uncommon plants and many breeding birds, such as tree pipits, nuthatches and hawfinches. Flora include the scarce lady orchid.

There is access to the site from Cockering Road.
