= Foxburrow Wood =

Nature reserve in Kent, United Kingdom

Coordinates: 51.350°N 0.599°E

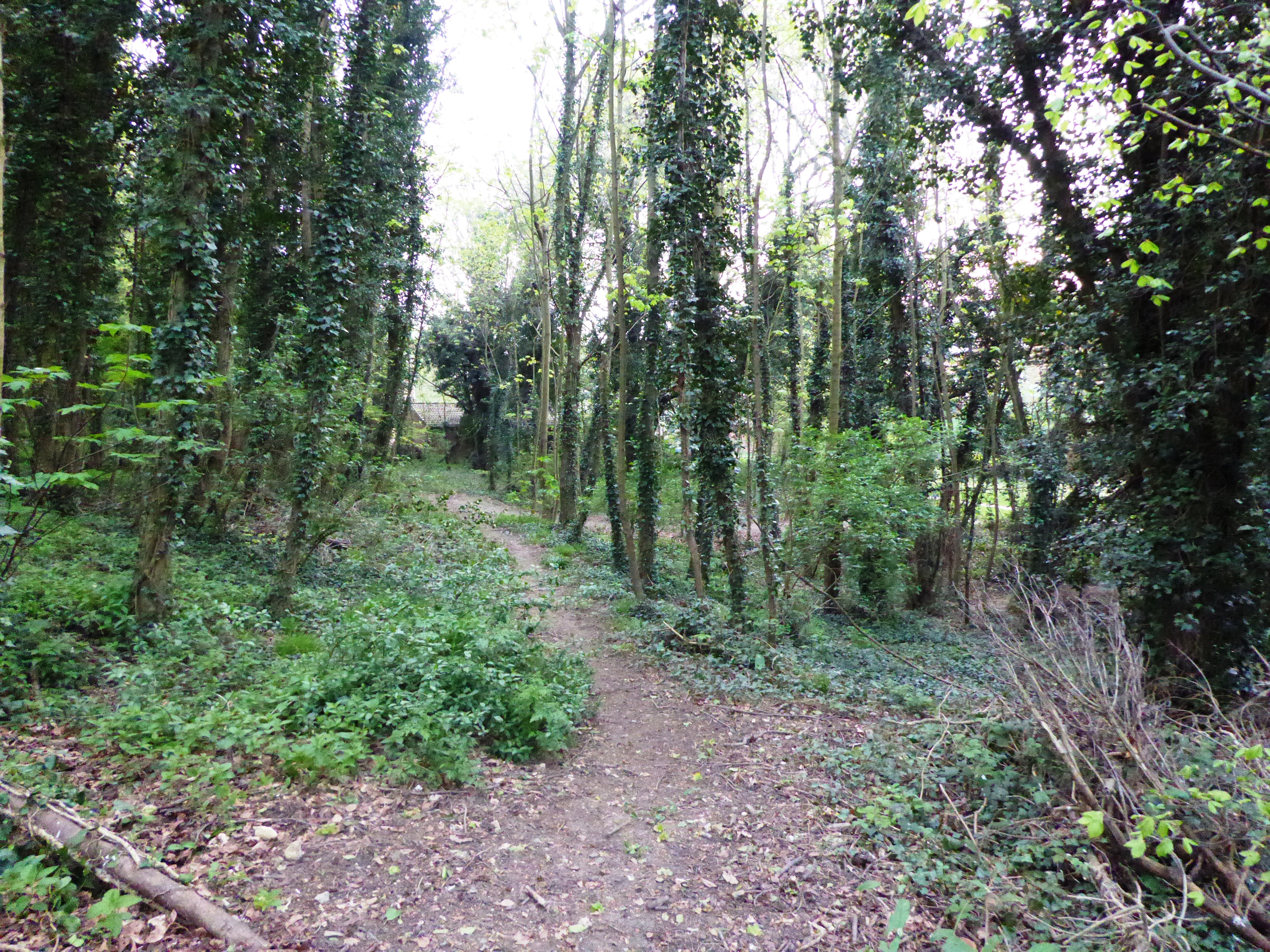
- Interactive map of Foxburrow Wood
- Type: Local Nature Reserve
- Location: Rainham, Kent
- OS grid: TQ 811 644
- Area: 6.1 hectares (15 acres)
- Manager: Medway Council

Foxburrow Wood is a 6.1-hectare (15-acre) Local Nature Reserve in Rainham in Kent. It is owned and managed by Medway Council.

This is a remnant of a much larger historic wood, and it has flora which are indicators of ancient woodland such as herb paris and bluebells.

There is access from Mierscourt Road and Deanwood Drive.
