= Rede Common =

Nature reserve in Strood, Kent, England

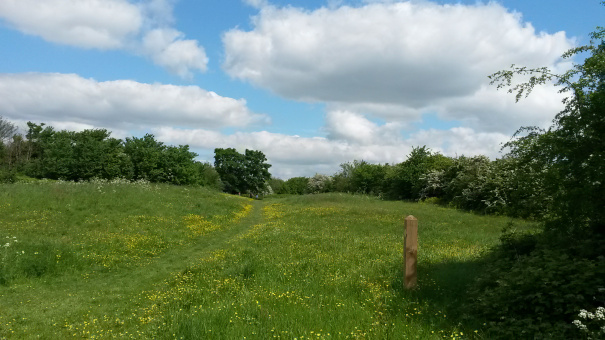
- Rede Common Sandy Banks Walk
- Interactive map of Rede Common
- Type: Local Nature Reserve
- Location: Strood, Kent
- OS grid: TQ719693
- Coordinates: 51.396427°N 0.470028°E
- Area: 11.2 hectares (28 acres)
- Manager: Friends of Rede Common
- Website: http://redecommon.org.uk

Rede Common is a 11.2-hectare (28-acre) Local Nature Reserve in Strood in Kent. It is owned and managed by Medway Council in partnership with Friends of Rede Common.

Known locally as Sandy Banks due to the underlying Thanet Beds, Rede Common was formerly farmland used for grazing, arable and market gardening and is now an area of open acid grasslands surrounded by scrub and trees.

Access points include entrances in Watling Street, Hyacinth Road and Columbine Close.

Friends of Rede Common conducted a survey of the site in 2020 finding wood mice, field voles, bank voles, foxes, grey squirrels, brown rats and moles. The group also observes a diverse range of birds and butterflies throughout the year.

The Strood Community Trail passes through Rede Common.
