= River Len Local Nature Reserve =

Nature reserve in Kent, United Kingdom

Coordinates: 51.271°N 0.533°E

River Len
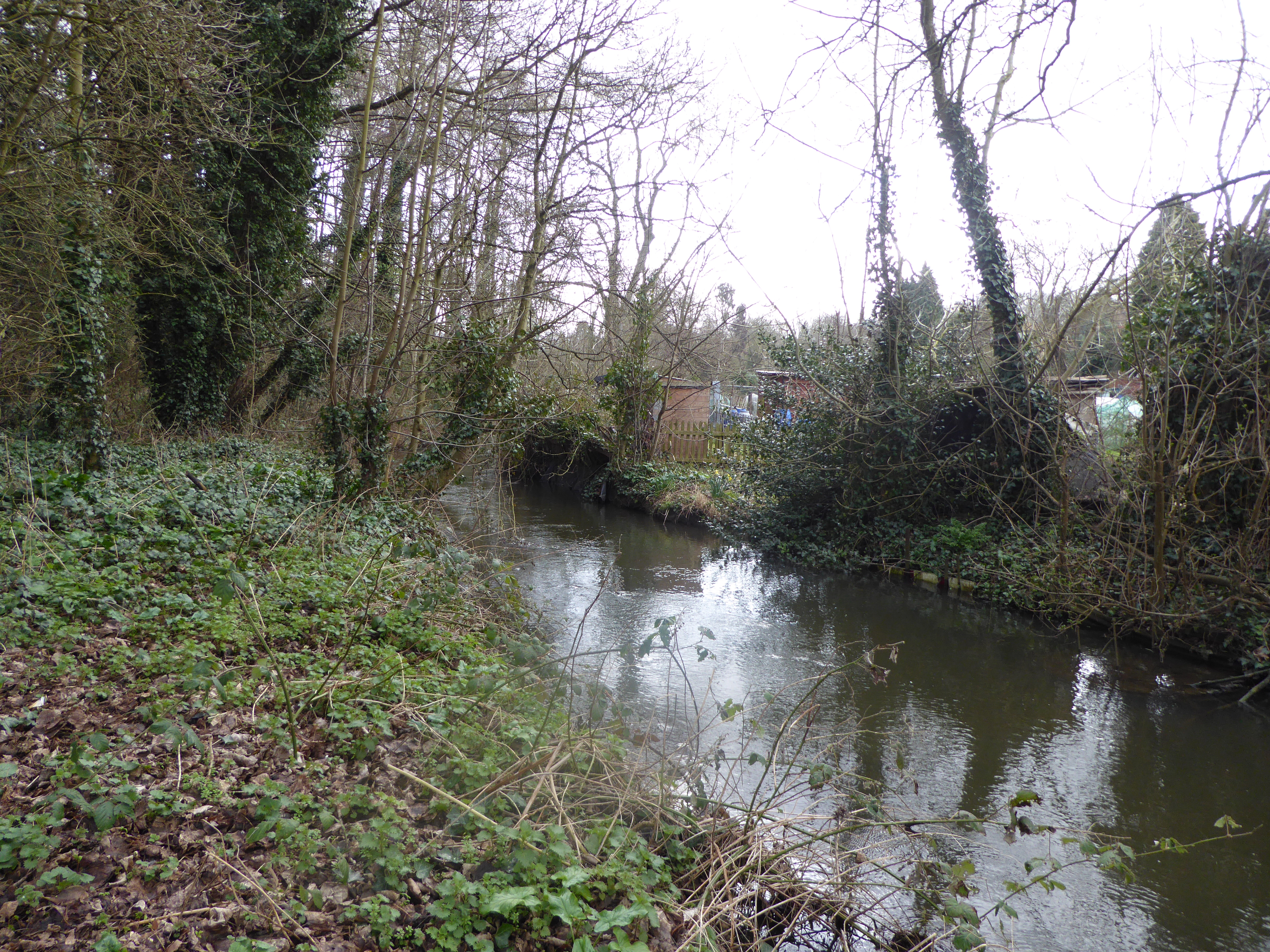
- Interactive map of River Len
- Type: Local Nature Reserve
- Location: Maidstone, Kent
- OS grid: TQ 768 555
- Area: 1.7 hectares (4.2 acres)

River Len is a 1.7-hectare (4.2-acre) Local Nature Reserve in Maidstone in Kent. It is owned and managed by Maidstone Borough Council.

This small site in an urban area next the River Len has some uncommon species such as water voles and soldier beetles.

Most of the site is open to the public.
