= Seasalter Levels =

Nature reserve in Kent, England

Coordinates: 51.338°N 0.991°E

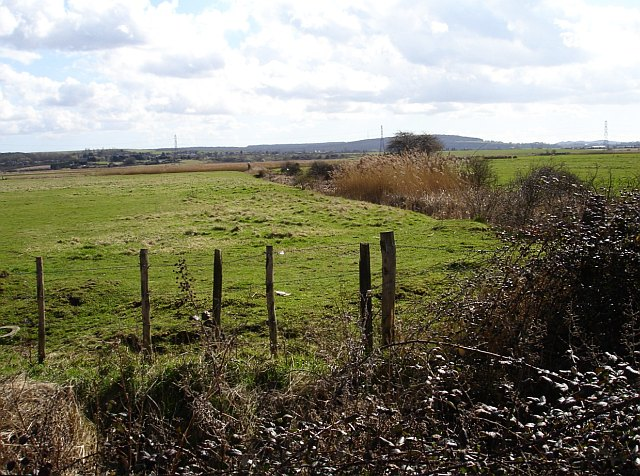
- Interactive map of Seasalter Levels
- Type: Local Nature Reserve
- Location: Whitstable, Kent
- OS grid: TR 084 641
- Area: 71.4 hectares (176 acres)
- Manager: Canterbury City Council

Seasalter Levels is a 71.4-hectare (176-acre) Local Nature Reserve in Seasalter, on the western outskirts of Whitstable in Kent. It is owned and managed by Canterbury City Council. It is part of The Swale Ramsar site, Special Protection Area and Site of Special Scientific Interest.

This freshwater grazing marsh is important for wildfowl and wading birds such as wigeons, redshanks, lapwings, mallards and shelducks.

There is no public access to the site.
