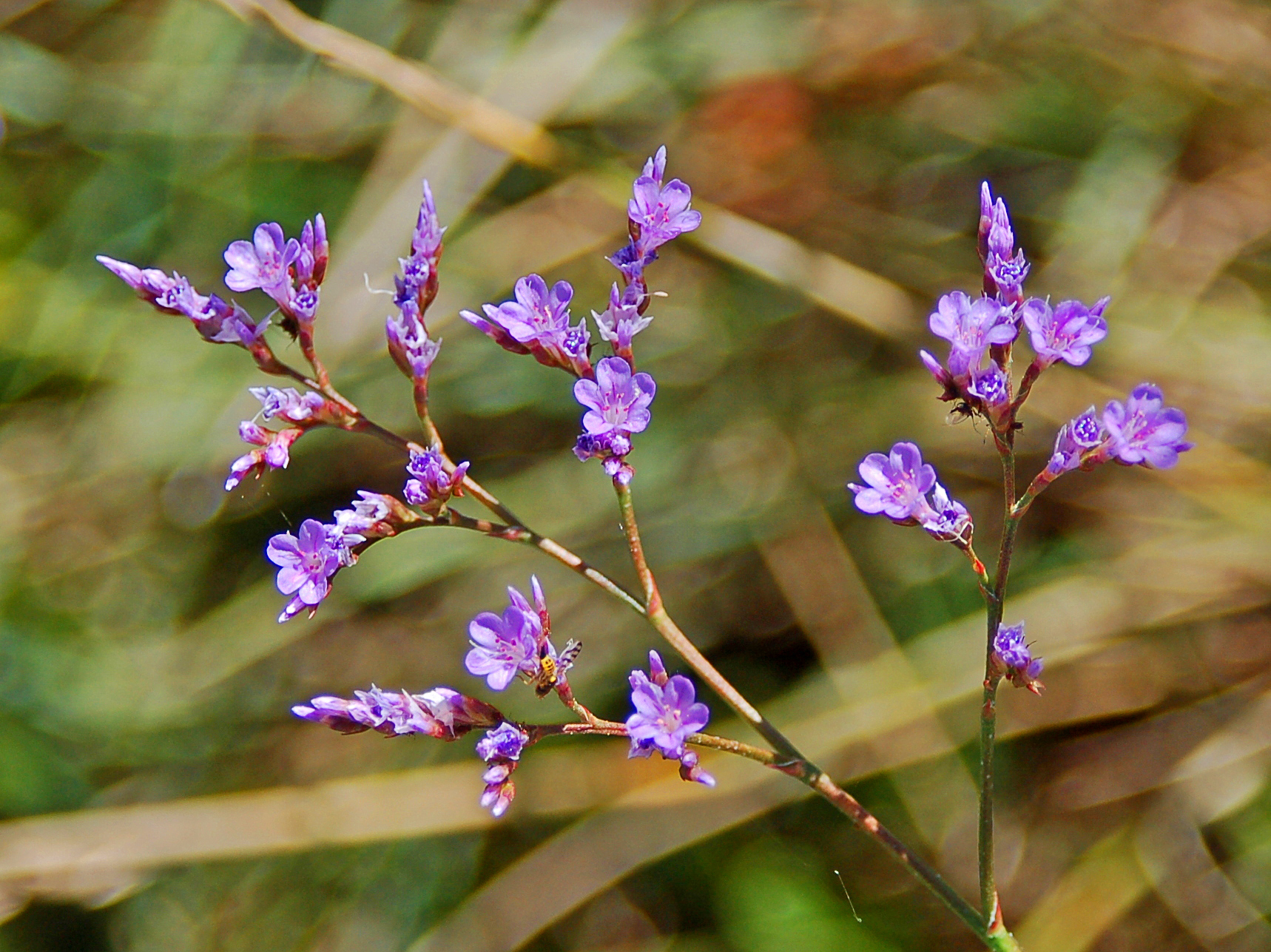
- Flowers of Limonium narbonense

Scientific classification
- Kingdom: Plantae
- Clade: Tracheophytes
- Clade: Angiosperms
- Clade: Eudicots
- Order: Caryophyllales
- Family: Plumbaginaceae
- Genus: Limonium
- Species: L. narbonense

Binomial name
- Limonium narbonense Mill.

= Limonium narbonense =

Species of flowering plant

Limonium narbonense is a species of sea lavender belonging to the family Plumbaginaceae.

== Synonyms ==
- Limonium angustifolium (Tausch) Degen
- Limonium angustifolium (Tausch) Turrill
- Limonium serotinum (Rchb.) Erben, nom. illeg.
- Limonium serotinum (Rchb.) Pignatti
- Limonium vulgare subsp. angustifolium (Tausch) P. Fourn.
- Limonium vulgare subsp. serotinum (Rchb.) Gams
- Statice angustifolia Tausch
- Statice brunii Guss.
- Statice limonium subsp. aggregata (Rouy) Rouy
- Statice limonium subsp. angustifolia (Tausch) Rouy
- Statice limonium subsp. serotina (Rchb.) Nyman
- Statice serotina Rchb.

== Description ==
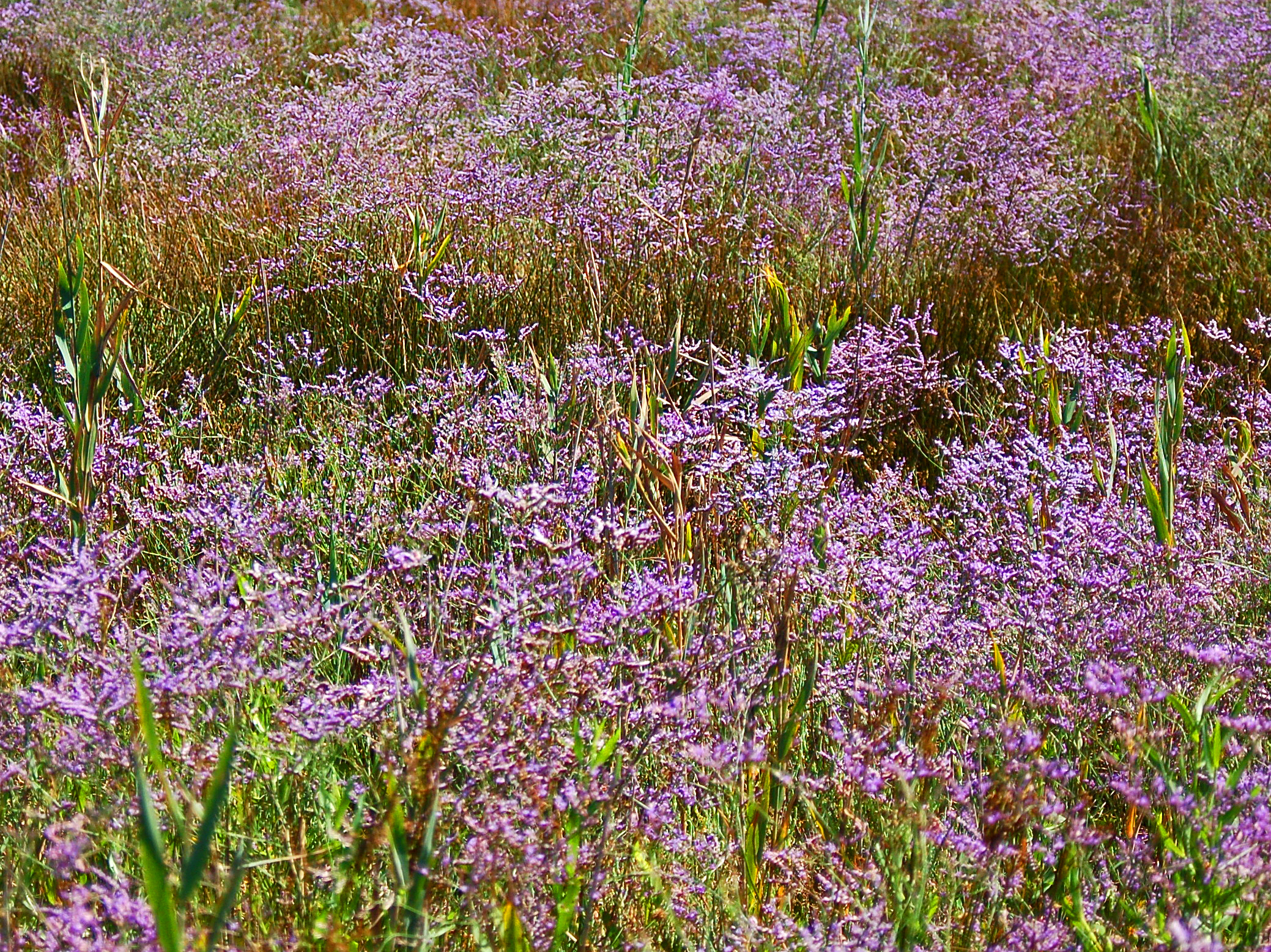
Plants of Limonium narbonense

Limonium narbonense is a perennial herbaceous plant that reaches the height of about 30–70 millimetres (1.2–2.8 in). The leaves are 12 to 30 inches long, lanceolate-spatulate, located in a basal rosette. The inflorescence is large, with only a few or absent sterile branches. The flowers are white to pale violet, with a calyx of about 5–7 mm. The flowering period extends from June to September.

== Distribution and habitat ==
This species can be found in Southern Europe, North Africa and in Southwest Asia. It is a plant of Mediterranean coastal habitat such as beaches, salt marshes, and coastal prairie, and other sandy saline habitats.

== Bibliography ==
- Conti F., Abbate G., Alessandrini A., Blasi C., 2005 -An Annoted Checklist of the Italian Vascular Flora. Roma
- Pignatti S. 1982 -Flora d'Italia. Bologna
- Palop-Esteban, Segarra-Moragues J, González-Candelas F.
