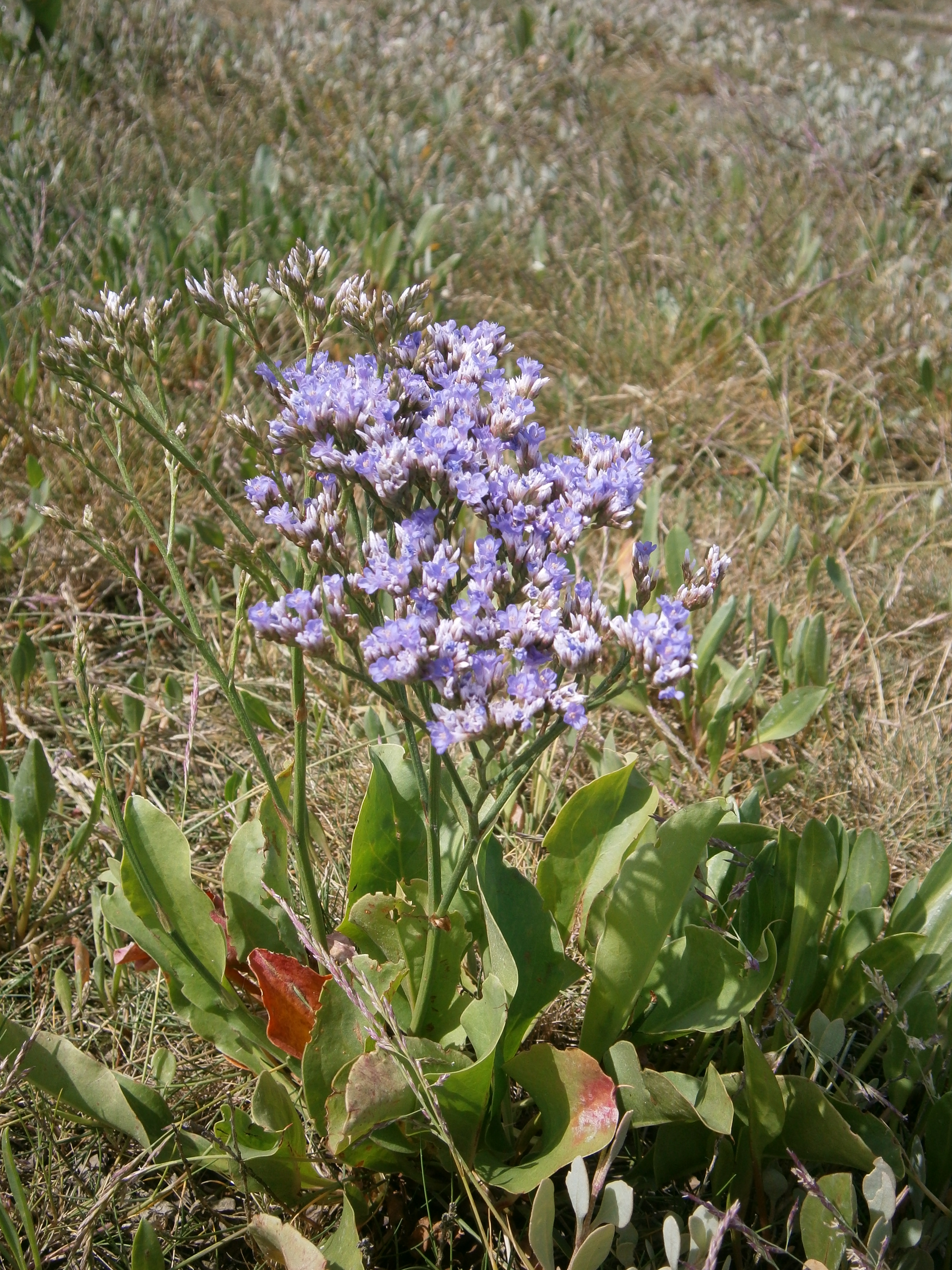

Scientific classification
- Kingdom: Plantae
- Clade: Embryophytes
- Clade: Tracheophytes
- Clade: Angiosperms
- Clade: Eudicots
- Order: Caryophyllales
- Family: Plumbaginaceae
- Genus: Limonium
- Species: L. vulgare

Binomial name
- Limonium vulgare Mill.

Synonyms
- List: Limonium commune Gray; Limonium limonium (L.) A.Lyons; Statice behen Drejer; Statice crouanii Lenorm. ex Nyman; Statice drepanensis Tineo ex Guss.; Statice limonia St.-Lag.; Statice limonium L.; Statice longidentata Lafont; Statice maritima Lam.; Statice pseudolimonium Rchb.; Statice scanica Warm.; Taxanthema limonium (L.) Sweet

= Limonium vulgare =

Species of flowering plant

Limonium vulgare, called common sea-lavender, is a species of flowering plant in the genus Limonium native to Atlantic parts of Europe from southwestern Sweden to southwestern Iberia, and introduced elsewhere. A clumping perennial found in salt marshes and other maritime habitats, it is a probable species complex that includes Limonium maritimum and L. narbonense.
