= South Wood =

Nature reserve in Kent, England

Coordinates: 51.346°N 0.566°E

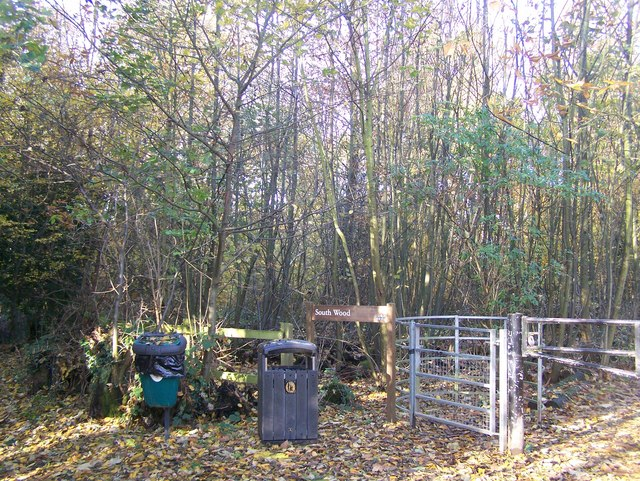
- Interactive map of South Wood
- Type: Local Nature Reserve
- Location: Hempstead, Kent
- OS grid: TQ 788 639
- Area: 6.6 hectares (16 acres)
- Manager: Medway Council

South Wood is a 6.6-hectare (16-acre) Local Nature Reserve in Hempstead, south of Gillingham in Kent. It is owned and managed by Medway Council.

This wood was formerly used for timber, and it is now managed as a nature reserve. It has a population of dormice, which are rare in Britain and the rest of Europe.

There is access from Lamplighters Close.
