= List of local nature reserves in England =

This is a list of local nature reserves in England. Each local nature reserve is designated by a local authority called the 'declaring authority'.

== Sites ==
Site	Declaring authority
Abbey Fishponds	Vale of White Horse
Abney Hall	Stockport
Abney Park Cemetery	London Borough of Hackney
Ackroyd Drive Greenlink	London Borough of Tower Hamlets
Acomb Wood and Meadow	York
Acornfield Plantation	Knowsley
Adderbury Lakes	Adderbury
Adelaide	London Borough of Camden
Afton Marshes	Isle of Wight
Ainsdale and Birkdale Hills	Sefton
Ainslie Wood	London Borough of Waltham Forest
Albans Wood	Watford
Alcott Wood	Solihull
Alder Coppice	Dudley
Alder Hills	Bournemouth, Christchurch and Poole
Alder Moors	Wokingham
Alderman Canal East	Ipswich
Alderman Canal West	Ipswich
Alexandrina Plantation	Broxtowe
Ali's Pond	Sonning
Alkincoats Woodland	Pendle
Alkrington Woods	Rochdale
Allensford Woods	Durham
Aller Brook	Teignbridge
Allerton (Eric Hardy)	Liverpool
Allestree Park	Derby
Alney Island	Gloucester
Alverstone Mead	Isle of Wight
Alverthorpe and Wrenthorpe Meadows	Wakefield
Ambarrow Court	Bracknell Forest
Amble Dunes	Northumberland
Ambley Wood	Medway
Anglers Country Park	Wakefield
Ankerdine Common	Worcestershire
Annitsford Pond	North Tyneside
Anston Stones Wood	Anston
Anton Crescent Wetland	London Borough of Sutton
Anton Lakes	Test Valley
Ardingly Reservoir	West Sussex
Arger Fen	Suffolk
Arlington Reservoir	East Sussex
Arthur Jacob Nature Reserve	Windsor & Maidenhead
Ash Priors Common	Somerset
Ashenground and Bolnore Woods	Mid Sussex
Ashford Green Corridors	Ashford
Ashlawn Cutting	Rugby
Ashtead Park	Mole Valley
Askers Meadow	Dorset
Aspall Close	West Suffolk
Astonfields Balancing Lakes	Stafford
Atkinson's Warren	North Lincolnshire
Avon Valley Reserve	Wiltshire
Avon Valley Woodland	South Gloucestershire
Axholme Line-Haxey	North Lincolnshire
Aylestone Meadows	Leicester & Blaby
Babbs Mill	Solihull
Bacombe Hill	Buckinghamshire
Badgers Hollow, Coton Park	South Derbyshire
Baggeridge Country Park	South Staffordshire
Bagnall Road Wood	Stoke-on-Trent
Balaams Wood	Birmingham
Ballowfield	Yorkshire Dales National Park Authority
Barbury Castle Country Park	Swindon
Barlaston and Rough Close Common	Staffordshire
Barley Valley	Exeter
Barlow Common	North Yorkshire
Barmston Pond	Sunderland
Barnes Common	London Borough of Richmond upon Thames
Barnes Meadow	West Northamptonshire
Barnett's Wood	Tunbridge Wells
Barnham Cross Common	Norfolk & Breckland
Barnsbury Wood	London Borough of Islington
Barnwell East	Cambridge
Barnwell II West	Cambridge
Barnwood Arboretum	Gloucester
Barrow Hill, Dudley	Dudley
Barrowburn Wood	Northumberland
Barton Mills Valley	West Suffolk
Barwick Pond	Stockton-on-Tees
Basingstoke Canal West	Hampshire
Bassington	Northumberland
Bassleton Wood and The Holmes	Stockton-on-Tees
Batchworth Heath	Three Rivers
Bateswood	Newcastle-under-Lyme
Batford Springs	St Albans
Bath Hills	South Norfolk
Battersea Park Nature Areas	London Borough of Wandsworth
Baty's Marsh	Medway
Beacon Hill	Brighton & Hove
Beam Valley	London Borough of Barking & Dagenham
Beam Valley (Environment Agency)	London Borough of Barking & Dagenham
Beckenham Place Park	London Borough of Lewisham
Bedelands Farm Nature Reserve	Mid Sussex
Bedfont Lakes Country Park	London Borough of Hounslow
Bedford's Park	London Borough of Havering
Bedlington Country Park	Northumberland
Bedworth Sloughs	Nuneaton and Bedworth
Beechwood Park	Calderdale
Beeston Sidings	Nottingham
Belfairs	Southend-on-Sea
Belmont Meadows	Herefordshire
Belmont Pastures	London Borough of Sutton
Belper Parks	Amber Valley
Belsize Wood	London Borough of Camden
Belton Hills	Southend-on-Sea
Belvidere Meadows	Exeter
Bemerton Heath and Barnards Folly	Wiltshire
Benfield Hill	Brighton & Hove
Bennett's Hole	London Borough of Merton
Bentley Priory	London Borough of Harrow
Benwell Nature Park	Newcastle upon Tyne
Berengrave Chalk Pit	Medway
Berrow Dunes	Somerset
Berry Coppice	Hampshire
Berry Head ( Now an NNR)	Torbay
Berryhill Fields	Stoke-on-Trent
Berwick Hills Community Park	Middlesbrough
Bevendean Down	Brighton & Hove
Beverley Parks	East Riding of Yorkshire
Bickenhall Orchard	Somerset
Biddulph Valley Way (Whitemoor)	Staffordshire Moorlands
Bidston Moss	Wirral
Big Wood and Little Wood	London Borough of Barnet
Billa Barra Hill Nature Reserve	Hinckley and Bosworth
Billingham Beck Valley Country Park	Stockton-on-Tees
Bills Wood	Solihull
Bincombe Beeches	Somerset
Bingham Linear Park	Rushcliffe
Bircham Valley	Plymouth
Birk Crag	North Yorkshire
Birstall	Leicestershire
Bisham Woods	Windsor & Maidenhead
Bishop Middleham Community Wildlife Garden	Durham
Bishop's Meadow	Charnwood
Bishops Waltham Branch	Hampshire
Bishopstone Cliffs	Canterbury
Bisley and West End Commons	Surrey
Bisley Road Cemetery	Stroud
Bixley Heath	Ipswich & East Suffolk
Black Bobbies Field Thornaby	Stockton-on-Tees
Black Park	Buckinghamshire
Blackhall Grasslands	Durham
Blackleach Country Park	Salford
Blackley Forest	Manchester
Blake Marsh	Wyre Forest
Blindley Heath	Tandridge
Blondin Park, Northfields	London Borough of Ealing
Blue Lagoon	Milton Keynes
Blundells Copse (Part of West Reading Woodlands)	Reading
Blunts Wood and Paiges Meadow	Mid Sussex
Blyth to Seaton Sluice Dunes	Northumberland
Bobbits Lane	Ipswich
Bocking Blackwater	Braintree
Bodmin Beacon	Cornwall
Boggart Hole Clough, Charlestown	Manchester
Boldre Foreshore	New Forest
Bonesgate Open Space	London Borough of Kingston upon Thames
Borough Woods	Northumberland
Borsdane Wood	Wigan
Boscombe & Southbourne Overcliffe	Bournemouth, Christchurch and Poole
Boscombe Chine	Bournemouth, Christchurch and Poole
Bothenhampton Nature Reserve	Dorset
Bourne Park Reed Beds	Ipswich
Bourne Valley	Bournemouth, Christchurch and Poole
Bovey Heathfield	Teignbridge
Bowden Housteads Wood/Carbrook Ravine	Sheffield
Bowthorpe Marsh	Norwich
Boxley Warren	Maidstone
Bracken Bank	Northumberland
Bracken Hill Wood	Durham
Brading Down	Isle of Wight
Bradley and Dixon Woods	North East Lincolnshire
Bradnam Wood	Windsor & Maidenhead
Bradwell Woods	Newcastle-under-Lyme
Bramblefields	Cambridge
Bramcote Hills Park Woodland	Broxtowe
Bramford Meadows	Suffolk
Bramley Bank	London Borough of Croydon
Brandy Hole Copse	Chichester
Brankin Moor	Darlington
Branksome Dene Chine	Bournemouth, Christchurch and Poole
Branston Water Park	East Staffordshire
Braywick Park	Windsor and Maidenhead
Breadsall Railway Cutting	Derbyshire
Brearley Wetland	Derbyshire
Breary Marsh	Leeds
Brent Reservoir / Welsh Harp	London Boroughs of Barnet & Brent
Brentmoor Heath	Surrey Heath
Brereton Heath	Cheshire East
Bretton Country Park	Wakefield
Breydon Water	Norfolk
Brickfield and Long Meadow	Braintree
Bridge Street	Bolton
Bridge Wood	Ipswich & East Suffolk
Bridgetts Pool	Stoke-on-Trent
Brierly Forest Park	Ashfield
Brinkburn	Darlington
Brinsley Headstocks	Broxtowe
Broad Ees Dole	Trafford
Broadlands	Herefordshire
Broadmoor Common	Herefordshire
Broadstone Heath	Bournemouth, Christchurch and Poole
Brockwell Meadows	Braintree
Brockton	Staffordshire
Bromham Lake	Bedford
Bromwich Wood	Birmingham
Brook Meadow (Emsworth)	Havant
Brookfield Pond (was CPA Pond)	High Peak
Brookmill Road	London Borough of Lewisham
Brookvale	Sefton
Broom Hill, Hadleigh	Babergh
Broome Heath	South Norfolk
Brough Park Fields	Staffordshire Moorlands
Brown Moss	Shropshire
Browns Wood	Bedford
Brownstones Quarry	Bolton
Broxhead Common, Bordon	Hampshire
Brumby Wood	North Lincolnshire
Brundall Church Fen	Norfolk
Brush Hill	Buckinghamshire
Buckingham Sand Pit	Buckinghamshire
Bucklands Pool (or Backwell Lake)	North Somerset
Buckpool and Fens Pool	Dudley
Bude Marshes	Cornwall
Budshead Wood	Plymouth
Bugdens Copse	Dorset
Bull Meadows	Colchester
Bulwell Hall Park Meadows	Nottingham City
Bumble Hole	Dudley
Buntings Wood	Thorne-Moorends
Burbage Common and Woods	Hinckley & Bosworth & Blaby
Bure Park	Cherwell
Buriton Chalk Pit	East Hampshire
Burlish Top	Wyre Forest
Burnt Ash Pond	London Borough of Lewisham
Burton and Chingford Ponds	West Sussex
Burton Mill Wood	Ellesmere Port and Neston
Bus Company Island	Canterbury
Butts Ponds Meadows	Sturminster Newton
Byerley Park	Durham
Byron's Pool	Cambridge
Cadbury Hill/Henley Quarry	North Somerset
Calshot Marshes	Hampshire
Camerton Batch	Bath and North East Somerset
Camley Street Natural Park	London Borough of Camden
Canley Ford Community Woodland	Coventry
Cann Woods The Andy Stevens LNR	Plymouth
Cannon Hill Common	London Borough of Merton
Canvey Lake	Castle Point
Captain's Wood	Buckinghamshire
Carlisle Park	Northumberland
Carlton Marsh	Barnsley
Carpenter's Wood, Dungrove Hill	Windsor & Maidenhead
Carr Wood, Derbyshire	Amber Valley
Carrs Woodland	Bath and North East Somerset
Cassiobury Park	Watford
Castle Clough and Cowbury Dale	Tameside
Castle Hill, Kirklees	Kirklees
Castle Hill	London Borough of Kingston upon Thames
Castle Hill, Newhaven	Lewes
Castle Island	Northumberland
Castlefields Wood	Northumberland
Catcliffe Flash	Rotherham
Catherington Down, Horndean	Hampshire
Catherington Lith, Horndean	East Hampshire
Cecilly Brook	Staffordshire Moorlands
Centenary Fields	Lingfield & Dormansland
Chaddesden Wood and Lime Lane Wood	Derby
Chadkirk Country Estate	Stockport
Chailey Common	East Sussex
Chairborough Road	Buckinghamshire
Chapelfield	Bury
Chapman's Well	Durham
Chard Reservoir	Somerset
Charlton's Pond	Stockton-on-Tees
Charwell Wetlands, Bradninch	Mid Devon
Cheddar Valley Railway Walk	North Somerset
Chellaston Brickworks	Derby
Chelmer Valley Riverside	Chelmsford
Cherry Orchard	Worcester
Cherry Wood	London Borough of Merton
Chertsey Meads	Runnymede
Chesham Woods	Bury
Chessel Bay	Southampton
Chevet Branch Line	Wakefield
Chevin Forest Park	Leeds
Chigwell Row Wood	Epping Forest
Children's Wood/Riverside	Somerset
Childwall Woods and Fields	Liverpool
Chineham Woods (including Great Sorrells, Tollhouse, Guinea & Long copses)	Basingstoke & Deane
Chinthurst Hill	Surrey
Chiswick Eyot	London Borough of Hounslow
Choppington Community Woods	Northumberland
Chorleywood Common	Hertfordshire
Chorleywood House Estate	Hertfordshire
Chorlton Ess and Ivy Green	Manchester
Chorlton Water Park	Manchester
Christian Fields	Lichfield
Church and Wains Hill (Poets Walk)	North Somerset
Church Lane Flood Meadow	Epping Forest
Church Meadow	Mid Suffolk
Church Wood and Robsack Wood	Hastings
Churchills, Teignbridge	Teignbridge
Clara Vale	Gateshead
Clarksons Wood	Redcar and Cleveland
Clayfield Copse	Reading
Claygate Common	Elmbridge
Claylands	Hampshire
Clayton Vale	Manchester
Cleadon Hills	South Tyneside
Cleatop Park	Yorkshire Dales National Park Authority
Cleethorpes Country Park	North East Lincolnshire
Cleethorpes Sands	North East Lincolnshire
Cleeve Prior Bank	Worcestershire
Clifton Backies	York
Clifton Country Park	Salford
Clifton Grove, Clifton Woods & Holme Pit Pond	Nottingham
Clincton Wood	Halton
Clinkham Wood Community Woodland	St Helens
Coate Water	Swindon
Cock Robin Wood	Rugby
Cockglode and Rotary Wood	Nottinghamshire
Cocksherd Wood	Slough
Codsall Coppice	Sandwell
Cogdean Elms	Dorset
Coke's Pit Lake	Gloucestershire
Colden Clough	Calderdale
Coldham's Common	Cambridge
Colemere	Shropshire
Colliers Moss	St Helens
Colliers Wood	Broxtowe
Colne, Wivenhoe	Colchester
Colne Valley, Colchester	Colchester
Colney Heath	St Albans
Colwick Woods	Nottingham
Colyford Common	East Devon
Cong Burn Wood	Durham
Coningsby	Lincolnshire
Consall	Staffordshire
Conygre Mead	Wiltshire
Coombe Hill Wood	London Borough of Kingston upon Thames
Coombe Valley	Teignbridge
Coombs Quarry	Buckinghamshire
Cooper's Hill, Bedfordshire	Central Bedfordshire
Coopers Hill, Gloucester	Gloucestershire
Coppett Hill	Herefordshire
Coppetts Wood and Glebelands	London Borough of Barnet
Coppice Leasowes, Church Stretton	Church Stretton
Corbet Wood & Grinshill	Shropshire
Corfe & Barrow Hills	Bournemouth, Christchurch and Poole
Corfe Hills	Dorset
Corston Quarry and Pond	Wiltshire
Cottage Bottom Fields	Central Bedfordshire
Cotwall End Valley	Dudley
Covert Way	London Borough of Enfield
Cow Plantation	Durham
Cowbury Dale	Tameside
Cowpen Bewley Woodland Country Park	Stockton-on-Tees
Cowraik Quarry	Westmorland and Furness
Coxhoe Quarry Road	Durham
Coyney Woods	Stoke on Trent
Crab Wood	Hampshire
Crackley Wood	Warwick
Cranberry Moss	Cheshire East
Crane Park Island	London Boroughs of Hounslow and Richmond-upon-Thames
Crane Valley	Tunbridge Wells
Cranebank, Hatton	London Borough of Hounslow
Cranham Brickfields	London Borough of Havering
Cranham Marsh	London Borough of Havering
Cranmer Green	London Borough of Merton
Crecy Hill	Oxfordshire
Cresswell Dunes	Northumberland
Crimdon Dene	Durham
Cromford Canal	Derbyshire
Cromwell Bottom	Calderdale
Crookhill Brickpits	Dorset
Cross Hill Quarry	Ribble Valley
Cross Lane Meadows	Gateshead
Cross O'Cliff Orchard	Lincolnshire
Crossness	London Borough of Bexley
Crow Trees	Durham
Crowborough Country Park	Crowborough
Crowfields Common	West Northamptonshire
Crown Meadow	Stone, Staffordshire
Croxley Common Moor	Three Rivers
Croxteth	Liverpool
Cuckoo Wood	Braintree
Cuckoo's Nook and The Dingle	Walsall
Cuddington Meadows	London Borough of Sutton
Cunningham Clough	Bolton
Curtis Wood	Canterbury
Cuttle Brook	South Oxfordshire
Dacres Wood	London Borough of Lewisham
Dagenham Village Churchyard	London Borough of Barking & Dagenham
Daisy Hill	Durham
Dalton Bank	Kirklees
Danby Wood	Norwich
Danebury Hillfort	Hampshire
Danes Dyke	East Riding of Yorkshire
Danesbury Park	Welwyn Hatfield
Daneshill Lakes (Gravel Pit)	Nottinghamshire
Daneshill Park Woods	Basingstoke & Deane
Danson Park Bog Garden, Welling	London Borough of Bexley
Daresbury Firs	Halton, Cheshire
Darland Banks	Medway
Darley and Nutwood	Derby
Daventry Country Park	West Northamptonshire
Davies Wood	Northumberland
Dawlish Warren (Part LNR, part NNR)	Teignbridge
Deadwater Valley	Whitehall, Hampshire
Dearne Valley Park	Barnsley
Decoy Country Park	Teignbridge
Deep Dene	Durham
Deer Pond	Burnley
Denham Country Park	London Borough of Hillingdon & Buckinghamshire
Denham Quarry Park	Buckinghamshire
Denton Dene	Newcastle upon Tyne
Derwent Floodwash	London Borough of Merton
Devon Park Pastures	Newark and Sherwood
Devonshire Avenue Nature Area	London Borough of Sutton
Dewlands Common	Dorset
Dibbinsdale	Wirral
Ditton Quarry	Ditton
Dodnor Creek	Isle of Wight
Doe Lea	Derbyshire
Doffcocker Lodge	Bolton
Dogsthorpe Star Pit	Peterborough
Donington & Albrighton	Shropshire
Dorchester Park	Halton
Dorridge Wood	Solihull
Dosthill Park	Tamworth
Downham Woodland Walk	London Borough of Lewisham
Drews Pond Wood	Wiltshire
Drigg Dunes and Gullery, Ravenglass	Lake District
Drinkfield Marsh	Darlington
Dryhill	Kent
Duffield Millennium Meadow	Duffield, Derbyshire
Duke's Hollow	London Borough of Hounslow
Dulwich Upper Wood	London Borough of Southwark
Dundridge Meadows	Hampshire
Dunsley Meadows	Cromford, Derbyshire
Dunston Common	South Norfolk
Dunston Pond (Acer Pond)	Gateshead
Eames Farm	Chichester
Earlham Park Woods	Norwich
Earlswood Common	Reigate & Banstead
Eastbrookend Country Park	London Borough of Barking & Dagenham
East Cramlington	Northumberland
East Pit	Cambridge
Eastern Road Nature Reserve	Mid Sussex
Eastfield, Sedgemoor Hill	Somerset
Eastrington Ponds	East Riding of Yorkshire
Eastwood and Battery Point	North Somerset
Eatock Lodge	Bolton
Eaton Common	Norwich
Ecclesall Woods	Sheffield
Edgbarrow Woods	Bracknell Forest
Edith Gardens	London Borough of Kingston upon Thames
Edolph's Copse	Mole Valley
Efford Marshes	Plymouth
Eight Acre Wood	Dorset
Elm Wood	Derby
Elmbridge Open Space	London Borough of Kingston upon Thames
Elmdon Manor	Solihull
Elsecar Reservoir	Barnsley
Elvaston	Derbyshire
Elvetham Heath	Hart
Englemere Pond	Bracknell Forest
Ensor's Pool	Nuneaton and Bedworth
Epsom Common	Epsom and Ewell
Errington Wood	Redcar and Cleveland
Esher Common	Elmbridge
Eston Moor	Redcar and Cleveland
Etherow Country Park	Stockport
Ewelme Watercress Beds	South Oxfordshire
Exmouth	East Devon
Eye Green	Peterborough
Fairburn Ings	West Yorkshire and North Yorkshire Councils
Fairmile Bottom	Arun
Far Ings	North Lincolnshire
Farley Copse	Bracknell Forest
Farlington Marshes	Portsmouth
Farndon Ponds	Farndon, Nottinghamshire
Farnham Park	Waverley
Farningham Wood	Sevenoaks
Farnley Hall Fishpond	Leeds
Farthinghoe	West Northamptonshire
Felmingham Cutting	Norfolk
Felton Common	North Somerset
Fen Alder Carr	Suffolk
Fenlake Meadows	Bedford
Fenn Washland	Essex
Ferndown	Stafford
Ferneydale Grassland	High Peak
Ferryhill Carrs	Durham
Filsham Reed Bed	Hastings
Fire Beacon Hill	East Devon
Firsby Reservoir	Rotherham
Firthmoor Grassland and Ponds	Darlington
Fisher's Field	Hertsmere
Fishpond Wood and Beverley Meads	London Borough of Merton
Fishwick Bottoms	Preston
Fitzwilliam Country Park	Wakefield
Flamborough Outer Headland	East Riding of Yorkshire
Flass Vale	Durham
Flatts Lane Woodland Country Park	Redcar and Cleveland
Fleet Pond	Hart
Flitton Moor	Central Bedfordshire
Flitwick Wood	Central Bedfordshire
Foal Hurst Wood	Tunbridge Wells
Folkestone Warren	Shepway, Kent
Folly Farm	Bath and North East Somerset
Foots Cray Meadows	London Borough of Bexley
Forbes Hole	Erewash, Derbyshire
Forder Valley	Plymouth
Forge Mill Lake	Sandwell
Fox Corner Wildlife Area	Guildford
Fox Covert	Erewash, Derbyshire
Fox Hagg	Sheffield
Fox Wood	London Borough of Ealing
Foxburrow Wood	Medway
Foxes Cross Bottom	Canterbury
Foxglove Covert	North Yorkshire
Foxhill Bank	Hyndburn, Lancashire
Foxley Wood	London Borough of Croydon
Frays Valley	London Borough of Hillingdon
Freeholder's Wood and Riddings Field	Yorkshire Dales National Park Authority
Fremington	North Devon
Frieze Hill Community Orchard	Somerset
Frodingham Railway Cutting	North Lincolnshire
Fryent Country Park	London Borough of Brent
Fulwell Quarry	Sunderland
Furzefield Wood and Lower Halfpenny	Hertsmere
Gadds Valley	Somerset
Galley and Warden Hills SSSI	Central Bedfordshire
Galley Common	Nuneaton and Bedworth
Galleywood Common	Chelmsford
Garston Park	Watford
Gatley Carrs	Stockport
Gedling House Meadow	Gedling, Nottinghamshire
Gedling House Woods	Gedling, Nottinghamshire
Geneva Wood	Darlington
Gillespie Park	London Borough of Islington
Glamis Meadow and Wood	North Northamptonshire
Gleadless Valley	Sheffield
Gledholt Woods	Kirklees
Glen Hills	Leicester
Glen Parva	Blaby, Leicestershire
Glodwick Lows Nature Reserve	Oldham
Gomm's Wood	Buckinghamshire
Gore Burn	Durham
Gorpley Clough	Calderdale
Gorse Covert	South Gloucestershire
Gorse Farm Wood	Sandwell
Gorse Hill & Elbury Mount	Worcester
Gosfield Sandpits, Braintree	Braintree
Goss Meadows	Leicester
Goytside Meadows	New Mills, Derbyshire
Grand Western Canal Country Park	Devon
Grange Valley	Preston
Granville	Telford and Wrekin
Grasslees Burn Woodland	Northumberland
Grattons Park	Crawley
Great Central Walk	Rugby
Great Eastern Pingo Trail	Norfolk
Great Oakley Meadow	North Northamptonshire
Great Wood	Tameside
Greatham Beck	Hartlepool
Green Farm Orchard	Gloucester
Green Lane Wood	Wiltshire
Greencroft Heath	Durham
Greenfield	Pendle
Greenfields	Shropshire
Greens Norton Pocket Park	Greens Norton, Northamptonshire
Greenslate Water Meadows	Wigan
Greenvale	Stockton-on-Tees
Griffiths Avenue	Cheltenham
Grimeshaw Wood	Peterborough
Grove Farm, Ealing	London Borough of Ealing
Grove House Wood	Thurrock
Grove Park Nature Reserve	Lewisham
Guisborough Branch Walkway	Redcar and Cleveland
Gull Coppice	Hampshire
Gunners Park, Shoeburyness	Southend-on-Sea
Gunnersbury Triangle	London Boroughs of Ealing and Hounslow
Gunton Warren and Corton Woods	East Suffolk
Gunton Wood	East Suffolk
Gutner Point	Hampshire
Gwithian Green	Gwinear–Gwithian, Cornwall
Gwithian Towans	Cornwall
Ha'penny Woods	Northumberland
Habberley Valley	Wyre Forest
Hackett's Marsh	Hampshire
Hackhurst Downs	Surrey
Hackney Marshes	Teignbridge
Hainault Lodge	London Borough of Redbridge
Hale Road Woodland	Halton, Cheshire
Hales Hall Pool	Staffordshire Moorlands
Half Crown Wood	Wyre Forest
Hall Farm Meadow, Hunningham	Warwick
Hall Lee Bank Park	Bolton
Hall Om Wong Park	Broxtowe
Halstead Road Centenary Pasture	Charnwood
Ham Common, Dorset	Bournemouth, Christchurch and Poole
Ham Common, Richmond	London Borough of Richmond-upon-Thames
Ham Dingle	Dudley
Ham Lands	London Boroughs of Kingston upon Thames and Richmond-upon-Thames
Hammersmith Meadows	Amber Valley
Happy Valley	Stockport
Hardwick Dene and Elm Tree Wood	Stockton-on-Tees
Harebreaks Wood	Watford
Harlow Marsh	Harlow
Harperley and Pea Woods	Durham
Harrington Reservoir	Cumberland
Harrison's Plantation	Nottingham
Harrold-Odell Country Park	Bedford
Hart to Haswell Walkway	Hartlepool
Hart Warren Dunes	Hartlepool
Harting Down	Chichester
Hartlebury Common/Hillditch Pool	Worcestershire
Harton Downhill	South Tyneside
Hartshill Park	Stoke-on-Trent
Haslam Park, Bolton	Bolton
Haslam Park, Preston	Preston
Hastings Country Park & Fairlight Place Farm	Hastings
Hatch Pond	Bournemouth, Christchurch and Poole
Hatchell Wood	Doncaster
Haughton Dale	Tameside
Havannah Nature Reserve	Newcastle upon Tyne
Havenside	Boston
Haverhill Railway Walks	West Suffolk
Haw Park Wood	Wakefield
Hawkenbury Meadow	Harlow
Hay Head Wood	Walsall
Hayley Green Wood	Bracknell Forest
Hayling Billy	Hampshire
Haymill Valley	Slough
Haysden Country Park	Tonbridge and Malling
Hazelslade	Cannock Chase
Hazleton Common, Horndean	Horndean, Hampshire
Healey Dell	Rochdale
Hearsall Common Woodland	Coventry
Heathlake	Wokingham
Heaton Mersey Common	Stockport
Heddon Common	Northumberland
Hednesford Hills Common	Cannock Chase
Hell Wath	North Yorkshire
Helsby Quarry	Chester
Hempstead Meadows	East Sussex
Hengistbury Head	Bournemouth, Christchurch and Poole
Henlow Common and Langford Meadows	Central Bedfordshire
Herald Way Marsh (Claybrook Marsh)	Coventry
Herbert Plantation	Hampshire
Herschel Park	Slough
Heswall Dales	Wirral
Hetton Bogs	Sunderland
Hic Bibi, Coppull Nature Reserve	Chorley
High Elms	London Borough of Bromley
High Meadow	Dover
Highfield Country Park, Levenshulme	Manchester
Highgate	Staffordshire
Highwood	Wokingham
Hilbert Woods	Tunbridge Wells
Hilbre Island	Wirral
Hilfield Hill	Dorset
Hilfield Park Reservoir	Hertfordshire
Hill Hook	Birmingham
Hill Park, Tatsfield	Surrey
Hill Rise	Bedford
Hills and Holes (also known as Hills & Hollows)	West Northamptonshire
Hills and Hollows	Preston
Hillsborough	North Devon
Hilly Fields	Colchester
Hindringham Meadows	Norfolk
Hob Moor	York
Hockley Woods	Rochford
Hocombe Mead	Eastleigh
Hodge Lane	Tamworth
Hoften's Cross Meadows	Staffordshire Moorlands
Hogsmill	Epsom & Ewell
Hogsmill River Park	London Borough of Kingston upon Thames
Holden Lane Pools	Stoke-on-Trent
Holland Haven	Tendring, Essex
Hollins Vale	Bury
Hollinwood Branch Canal	Tameside
Holly Hill Woodland Park	Fareham
Holly Wood	Sandwell
Holme Park Quarry	Westmorland and Furness
Holt Copse & Joel Park	Wokingham
Holtspur Bank	Buckinghamshire
Holyford Wood	East Devon
Holywell Dene	Northumberland and North Tyneside
Home Mead	Epping Forest
Hook with Warsash	Hampshire
Hookstone Wood	North Yorkshire
Hopwood Woodlands	Rochdale
Horden Grasslands	Durham
Hornhill Meadow (in Worcester Woods Country Park)	Worcestershire
Horton Country Park	Epsom and Ewell
Hosehill Lake	West Berkshire
Hothfield Common	Ashford, Kent
Hounslow Heath	London Borough of Hounslow
Howden Marsh	East Riding of Yorkshire
Howe Dell	Welwyn Hatfield
Howe Grove Wood	Dacorum, Hertfordshire
Hucclecote Meadow	Gloucester
Huckford Quarry	South Gloucestershire
Hucknall Road Linear Walkway	Nottingham
Hudson's Way	East Riding of Yorkshire
Hulmes and Hardy Wood and Lower Haughton Meadows	Tameside
Humber Bridge	East Riding of Yorkshire
Humberstone Park	Leicester
Hurcott Pools and Wood	Wyre Forest
Hurst Clough	Tameside
Hurstone Farm Woodlands	Somerset
Hutchinson's Bank	London Borough of Croydon
Hutton Country Park	Brentwood
Hylton Dene	Sunderland
Iford Meadows	Bournemouth, Christchurch and Poole
Ifton Meadows	Shropshire
Ingrebourne Valley	London Borough of Havering
Inholms Clay Pit	Mole Valley
Iping Common (Stedham with Iping)	West Sussex
Isleham	Cambridgeshire
Isleworth Ait	London Borough of Hounslow
Islip Manor Meadows	London Borough of Ealing
Ivel Springs	Hertfordshire
Jacksons' Brickworks	Cheshire East
Jellyfields, Walditch	Dorset
Jerusalem Farm	Calderdale
Jetty Marsh	Teignbridge
Jobs Close	Solihull
Jock's Copse	Bracknell Forest
Jubilee Country Park	London Borough of Bromley
Jubilee Lake	Wootton Bassett
Jubilee Wood	London Borough of Kingston upon Thames
Jumping Downs	Canterbury
Kempton	London Borough of Hounslow
Kendal Park (Hullbridge Foreshore)	Rochford, Essex
Kenilworth Common	Warwick
Kensington Meadows	Bath and North East Somerset
Kenwith Valley	Torridge
Kersal Moor	Salford
Kettlebrook	Tamworth
Keyworth Meadow	Rushcliffe
Killington Bridge	Yorkshire Dales National Park Authority
Kilminorth Woods	Cornwall
Kinewell Lake	Northamptonshire
King Georges Park	Broxtowe
Kingfisher	Birmingham
Kingfisher Trail	East Staffordshire
Kingmoor Sidings	Cumberland
Kings Norton	Birmingham
Kings Wood	North Northamptonshire
Kingsford Forest Park	Worcestershire
Kingsmead Marsh	Stafford
Kingsthorpe	West Northamptonshire
Kingston and Bourn Old Railway	Cambridgeshire
Kingston Pool Covert (South)	Stafford
Kings Wood and Glebe Meadows, Houghton Conquest	Central Bedfordshire
Kinson Common	Bournemouth, Christchurch and Poole
Kirby Frith	Leicester
Kirklees Valley	Bury
Kirtlington Quarry	Cherwell
Kites Croft	Hampshire
Knapp Copse	Devon
Knapton Cutting	Norfolk
Knighton Spinney	Leicester
Knott Hill Reservoir	Tameside
Knowle Hill	Warwick
Kyo Bogs	Durham
Ladderedge Country Park	Staffordshire Moorlands
Ladies Mile	Brighton & Hove
Lakeside Park	Guildford
Lancing Ring	Adur
Landguard Common	Suffolk
Lanercost	Northumberland
Langcliffe and Attermire	Yorkshire Dales National Park Authority
Langold Country Park	Bassetlaw
Larkey Valley Wood	Canterbury
Lattersey Field	Fenland
Laugherne Brook	Worcester
Lavells Lake (Dinton Pastures)	Wokingham
Lavender Pond	London Borough of Southwark
Lawrence Western Moor	Bristol
Leam Valley	Warwick
Leathes Ham	East Suffolk
Leigh Common	Dorset
Len Valley	Maidstone
Lepe Point	Hampshire
Lesnes Abbey Woods	London Borough of Bexley
Letchmire Pastures	Leeds
Levan Strice	Medway
Levenhulme	Bolton
Lexden Park	Colchester
Limbrick Wood	Coventry
Limekiln Close and West Pit	Cambridge
Limekiln Gill	Durham
Limekiln Wood	Telford & Wrekin
Linder's Field	Epping Forest
Lindow Common	Cheshire East
Linford Wood	Thurrock
Lingfield Wildlife Area	Tandridge
Lings Wood	West Northamptonshire
Linnell Road	Rugby
Linthorpe Cemetery	Middlesbrough
Lion Wood	Norwich
Liss Riverside Railway Walk, Liss (South)	Liss, Hampshire
Liss Riverside Railway Walk, Liss (North)	East Hampshire
Litcham Common	Norfolk
Litten	London Borough of Ealing
Little Downham	Little Downham
Little Mountain Common	Herefordshire
Little Paxton Pits	Huntingdonshire
Little Wood	Durham
Lodge Field	Telford & Wrekin
Loftus Wood	Redcar and Cleveland
Logan's Meadow	Cambridge
Lollycocks Field	North Kesteven
Lomeshaye Marsh	Pendle
Long Wood (and Hounslow)	London Borough of Ealing
Longmoor Bog	Wokingham
Longton Brickcroft	South Ribble
Lonsdale Road Reservoir (Leg of Mutton Reservoir)	London Borough of Richmond-upon-Thames
Lopwell Dam	West Devon
Lousehill Copse (Part of West Reading Woodlands)	Reading
Lousy Bush	Central Bedfordshire
Low Hall Park	Wigan
Low Newton Junction	Durham
Lower Spen Wildlife Area	Kirklees
Lower Wandle	London Borough of Merton
Lowerhouse Lodges	Burnley
Loxley and Wadsley Common	Sheffield
Lucas Marsh	Oadby & Wigston
Luscombe Valley	Bournemouth, Christchurch and Poole
Lye Valley	Oxford
Lymington-Keyhaven Marshes	Hampshire
Lynchmere Commons	West Sussex
Lyppard Grange	Worcester
Lytham St Annes	Fylde
Magdalen Quarry	Oxford
Magnolia Fields (or Magnolia Park)	Rochford
Maiden Erlegh	Earley, Berkshire
Maidscross Hill	West Suffolk
Maltby Commons	Rotherham
Malvern and Brueton Park	Sohihull
Manor Farm	Hampshire
Manor Farm, Long Eaton	Erewash
Manor Road Community Woodland	Bath and North East Somerset
Marden Quarry	North Tyneside
Mardley Heath	Welwyn Hatfield
Mare Fen	Cambridgeshire
Mareham Pastures	Lincolnshire
Marline Wood	Hastings
Marsden Old Quarry	South Tyneside
Marshall's Arms	Cheshire West and Chester
Marshalls Heath	St Albans
Marshes Hill Common	Staffordshire Moorlands
Marston Marshes	Norwich
Marston Thrift	Central Bedfordshire
Martins Pond	Nottingham
Marton Mere	Blackpool
Marylands	Rochford
Maryon Wilson Park and Gilbert's Pit	Royal Borough of Greenwich
Matlock Parks	Derbyshire Dales
Maulden Church Meadows SSSI	Central Bedfordshire
Maun Valley Park	Mansfield
Mayesbrook Park, South	London Borough of Barking and Dagenham
Mayfield Broom	Goole
Mayford Meadows	Woking
McIlroy Park (Part of West Reading Woodlands)	Reading
Meadow Covert	Rushcliffe
Meanwood Valley	Leeds
Meddon Green	Torridge
Melwood	Cambridgeshire
Mercury Marshes	Hampshire
Mere Clough	Bury
Merrion's Wood	Walsall
Mersey Vale Nature Park	Stockport
Merton Park Green Walks	London Borough of Merton
Mickleover Meadows	Derby
Middle Hill Common	North Somerset
Middleton Woods	Leeds
Milford on Sea	New Forest
Mill Hill	Adur
Mill Lane	Walsall
Mill Meadows	Basildon
Mill Stream	East Suffolk
Millennium Wood	Suffolk
Millennium Wood, Disley	Cheshire East
Miller's Pond	Southampton
Millfield Pond	Bournemouth, Christchurch and Poole
Millhams Mead	Bournemouth, Christchurch and Poole
Millington Wood	East Riding of Yorkshire
Millisons Wood	Solihull
Millom Ironworks	Cumberland
Millwood and Alder Wood	Liverpool
Milner Royd	Calderdale
Moira Junction	Leicestershire
Moldrums Ground	Somerset
Molesey Heath	Elmbridge
Monks Pool and Bradley Brook	South Gloucestershire
Moorbridge Pond and Springfield Corner	Nottingham
Moorcroft Wood	Walsall
Morden Park	London Borough of Merton
Moreton Hall Community Woods	West Suffolk
Morley Quarry	Charnwood
Mortimore's Wood	Wiltshire
Moseley Bog	Birmingham
Moses Gate	Bolton
Mousehold Heath	Norwich
Mousesweet Brook	Sandwell
Mousley Bottom	Derbyshire
Mowbray Fields	South Oxfordshire
Mowsbury Hill	Bedford
Mudchute Park Farm	London Borough of Tower Hamlets
Murdishaw Wood and Valley	Halton
Myrna Close	London Borough of Merton
Nature Alive	North West Leicestershire
Nazeing Triangle	Epping Forest
Nea Meadows	Bournemouth, Christchurch and Poole
Needham Lake	Mid Suffolk
Netherclay Community Woodland	Somerset
Netherfield Lagoons	Gedling
Netley Common	Hampshire
New Lount	Leicestershire
Newbold Quarry	Rugby
Newmillerdam	Wakefield
Newtown Marshes (Now an NNR, but small part retained as an LNR)	Isle of Wight
Nine Wells	Cambridge
No Mans Orchard	Canterbury
Nob End	Bolton
Noddle Hill	Hull
Norbriggs Flash	Chesterfield
Nore Hill Pinnacle	Surrey
Norland Moor	Calderdale
Norsey Wood	Basildon
North Kilworth	Harborough
Northaw Great Wood Country Park	Welwyn Hatfield
Northcliffe Quarry	Doncaster
Northmoor Hill Wood	Buckinghamshire
Northolt Manor	London Borough of Ealing
Norton Common	Hertfordshire
Norton Grange Marsh	Stockton-on-Tees
Norton Hillfort	Somerset
Norwood Nature Park	Gateshead
Noses Point	Durham
Nosterfield	North Yorkshire
Nottingham Canal	Broxtowe
Notton Wood	Wakefield
Nunhead Cemetery	London Borough of Southwark
Nunnery Wood (in Worcester Woods Country Park)	Worcestershire
Nutborne Marshes	Chichester
Oak Avenue Hampton	London Borough of Richmond-upon-Thames
Oak Hill Wood	London Borough of Barnet
Oak Tree Heath	Mansfield
Oakerthorpe	Derbyshire
Oakfrith Wood	Wiltshire
Oakham	Mansfield
Oakleigh Way	London Borough of Merton
Oakwell Park	Kirklees
Oakwood and Blacklow Spinneys	Warwick
Oare Marshes	Swale
Occombe Farm & Scadson Woods	Torbay
Occombe Valley Woods	Torbay
Ockham and Wisley	Surrey
Ockwells Park	Windsor & Maidenhead
Offerton Wetlands	Worcester
Ogden Water	Calderdale
Old Denaby Wetland	Doncaster
Old Lodge, Nutley	East Sussex
Old Roar Gill & Coronation Wood	Hastings
Old Town Park	West Devon
One Tree Hill	London Borough of Southwark
Otterhead Lakes	Somerset
Oughtonhead Common	North Hertfordshire
Owlet Plantation	Lincolnshire
Owston Ferry Castle	North Lincolnshire
Oxenbourne Down, Clanfield	Hampshire
Oxhey Woods	Three Rivers
Oxleas Wood/Shooters Hill Woodlands	Royal Borough of Greenwich
Oxleys Wood	Welwyn Hatfield
Oxmoor Wood	Halton
Paddington Meadows	Warrington
Paddock Wood	Northumberland
Padworth Common	West Berkshire
Pagham Harbour	West Sussex
Palmers Rough	Solihull
Palmerston Park Woods	Mid-Devon
Pamber Forest	Basingstoke and Deane
Par Beach and St. Andrews Road	Cornwall
Paradise	Cambridge
Park Lime Pits	Walsall
Park Wood, Bedford (formerly Brickhill Allotments)	Bedford
Park Wood, Coventry	Coventry
Park Woods, Gouldings Wood	Windsor & Maidenhead
Parkland Walk	London Boroughs of Haringey and Islington
Parliament Piece, Kenilworth	Warwick
Parndon Woods and Common	Harlow
Parr Hall Millennium Green	St Helens
Parsloes Park Squatts	London Borough of Barking and Dagenham
Pearman's Copse	Wokingham
Pelaw Quarry Pond	Gateshead
Pelsall North Common	Walsall
Pennington's Copse, Alder Bed and Broadmoor	Dorset
Pennytown Ponds	Amber Valley
Perivale Wood	London Borough of Ealing
Perry Wood	Worcestershire
Pevensey Road	London Borough of Hounslow
Pewit Carr	Derbyshire County Council
Pewley Down	Guildford
Philips Park	Bury
Phoenix Parkway	North Lincolnshire
Pickerings Pasture	Halton
Pickers Ditch Meadow	Tendring
Pig Wood	Coventry
Piggy Wood	Bracknell Forest
Pigney's Wood	North Norfolk
Pilsey Island	Chichester
Pine Springs	Bournemouth, Christchurch and Poole
Pioneer Meadows	Erewash
Pipers Vale	Ipswich
Pity Me Carrs	Durham
Plants Hill Wood	Coventry
Plantsbrook	Birmingham
Pleasington Old Hall Woods	Blackburn with Darwen
Pleasley Pit Country Park	Derbyshire
Pleasley Vale (Meden Trail)	Mansfield
Poise Brook	Stockport
Pontefract Country Park	Wakefield
Pool Dam Marshes	Newcastle-under-Lyme
Pope Lane and Boilton Wood	Preston
Popley Ponds	Basingstoke & Deane
Porter Valley Woodlands	Sheffield
Portland Park	Ashfield, Nottinghamshire
Potter Holes Plantation	Barnsley
Potterne Hill	Dorset
Poulton Wood, Aldington	Ashford
Poynton Coppice	Cheshire East
Preston Junction	Lancashire
Prestwick Road Meadows	Three Rivers
Prestwood (Picnic Site)	Buckinghamshire
Priestclose Wood	Northumberland
Primrose	South Tyneside
Prince's Beachlands	Dover
Prince's Plot, Charminster	Charminster
Priory Woods	Sandwell
Proctor's Barn Meadows	Redditch
Pug's Hole	Bournemouth, Christchurch and Poole
Pugneys Country Park	Wakefield
Purewell Meadows	Bournemouth, Christchurch and Poole
Purwell Meadows	North Hertfordshire
Putnoe Wood	Bedford
Pyl Brook	London Borough of Merton
Quarry Lane	Mansfield
Quarry Moor	North Yorkshire
Quarry Wildlife Garden	Swindon
Quarry Wood	Stockton-on-Tees
Quedgeley Arboretum	Gloucester
Queen Elizabeth II Country Park	Northumberland
Queen's Wood	London Borough of Haringey
Queendown Warren	Swale
Queens Jubilee Nature Trail	Sefton
Queenswood Country Park	Herefordshire
Radipole Community Woodland	Dorset
Radipole School	Dorset
Radnor Street Cemetery	Swindon
Raeburn Open Space	London Borough of Kingston upon Thames
Railway Fields	London Borough of Haringey
Railway Land, Lewes	Lewes
Railway Terrace	Bradford
Railway Walk, Hadleigh	Babergh
Rainham Marshes	London Borough of Havering
Rainworth Water	Nottinghamshire
Raisby Way and Trimdon Grange Quarry	Durham
Ravenmeols Hills	Sefton
Ravensbury Park	London Borough of Merton
Ravensdale	Mansfield
Reabrook Valley	Shropshire
Rectory Meadow	Hartley, Kent
Red Hill	Lincolnshire
Red River	Heanor & Loscoe, Derbyshire
Red River Valley	Cornwall
Reddish Vale	Stockport
Redditch Woods: Foxlydiate Wood	Redditch
Redditch Woods: Oakenshaw Wood	Redditch
Redditch Woods: Pitcheroak Wood	Redditch
Redditch Woods: Southcrest Wood	Redditch
Redditch Woods: Walkwood Coppice	Redditch
Rede Wood	Suffolk
Redhill Common	Bournemouth, Christchurch and Poole
Redisher Wood	Bury
Redstone	Wyre Forest
Reedbed	Leicestershire
Reigate Heath	Reigate & Banstead
Retford Cemetery	Bassetlaw
Rew Down	Isle of Wight
Rickmansworth Aquadrome	Three Rivers
Ring’s End	Cambridgeshire
Ripple Nature Reserve	London Borough of Barking and Dagenham
Risley Moss	Warrington
Rivacre Valley	Cheshire West and Chester
River Arrow	Stratford-on-Avon
River Darwen Parkway	Blackburn with Darwen
River Mole	Mole Valley
River Wylye	Wiltshire
Riverside Park	Guildford
Riverside Park, Macclesfield	Cheshire East
Riverside Walk, Hadleigh	Babergh
Riverside Walk, Virginia Water	Runnymede
Rixton Clay Pits	Warrington
Roadford Lake	West Devon
Robinswood Hill Country Park	Gloucester
Rocher Vale	Tameside
Rock Edge	Oxford
Rockford Fields	Hull
Rockhouse Dene	Durham
Rockwell	Darlington
Rodborough Common	Surrey
Roding Valley Meadows	Epping Forest
Roe Woods and Crabtree Pond	Sheffield
Romney Warren	Shepway
Ronkswood Hill Meadows	Worcester
Rose Walk	London Borough of Kingston upon Thames
Rosecroft Wood	Redcar and Cleveland
Rossett Nature Reserve	North Yorkshire
Rotherlands	East Hampshire
Rough Wood	Walsall
Rough Wood Chase	Walsall
Roughtalley's Wood LNR	Epping Forest
Round Coppice	Hampshire
Round Copse	Reading
Roundshaw Downs	London Borough of Sutton
Rowhill Copse	Waverley
Rowley Green Common	London Borough of Barnet
Rowthorne Trail	Derbyshire
Royate Hill	Bristol
Roydon Fen	South Norfolk
Rubery Cutting	Birmingham
Ruffett and Big Woods	London Borough of Sutton
Rufford Country Park (part)	Nottinghamshire
Ruislip (now part of the NNR)	London Borough of Hillingdon
Runcorn Hill	Halton
Rushey Platt Canalside Park	Swindon
Rye Harbour	East Sussex
Ryton Willows	Gateshead
Sacriston Wood	Durham
Saintbridge Balancing Pond	Gloucester
Salary Brook	Colchester
Salcombe to Kingsbridge	South Hams
Salmon Pasture	Sheffield
Saltersford Wood	Leicestershire
Salthill Quarry	Ribble Valley
Salt Way, Ditchley	West Oxfordshire
Saltwells	Dudley
Sandall Beat	Doncaster
Sandlings	East Suffolk
Sands Bank	Buckinghamshire
Sandy Lane	Broxtowe
Sandy Point	Hampshire
Sawcliffe	North Lincolnshire
Sayer's Croft	Surrey
Scadbury Park	London Borough of Bromley
Scalpcliffe Hill	East Staffordshire
Scarr & Long Woods	Calderdale
Scholes Coppice and Keppel's Field	Rotherham
Scotch Gill Wood	Northumberland
Scraptoft	Harborough
Scratchwood and Moat Mount Open Spaces	London Borough of Barnet
Scrattons Ecopark and extension	London Borough of Barking and Dagenham
Screech Owl	Somerset
Scrub Field	West Northamptonshire
Seaford Head	Lewes
Seasalter Levels	Canterbury
Seaton Dunes and Common (Part of the SSSI)	Hartlepool
Seaton Marshes	East Devon
Seaton Valley North	Cornwall
Seaton Valley South	Cornwall
Seckar Wood	Wakefield
Sellars Wood	Nottingham
Selsdon Wood	London Borough of Croydon
Seven Acres	Bolton
Seven Fields	Swindon
Sharphill Wood	Rushcliffe
Sharrow School Green Roof, Sheffield	Sheffield
Shawford Down	Hampshire
Sheep's Green and Coe Fen	Cambridge
Sheepleas	Surrey
Sheepwash	Sandwell
Sheffield General Cemetery	Sheffield
Shere Woodlands	Surrey
Sherrardspark Wood	Welwyn Hatfield
Sherwood Heath	Newark & Sherwood
Shibden Park & Cunnery Wood	Calderdale
Shibdon Pond	Gateshead
Shide Chalk Pit	Isle of Wight
Shire Brook Valley	Sheffield
Shire Oak Park	Walsall
Shoal Hill Common	South Staffordshire
Shoeburyness Old Ranges	Southend-on-Sea
Shoreham Beach	Adur
Shortheath Common	Hampshire
Shrubhill Common	Dacorum
Sibden Hill and Batts Copse	Isle of Wight
Siddick Pond	Cumberland
Siding Lane Woodland	St Helens
Sigglesthorne Station	East Riding of Yorkshire
Silica Lodge	North Lincolnshire
Silk Mills Park and Ride	Somerset
Silver Street	Bath and North East Somerset
Silverlink Biodiversity Park	North Tyneside
Sinfin Moor	Derby
Singlers Marsh	Welwyn Hatfield
Sir Joseph Hood Memorial Wood	London Borough of Merton
Slader's Leigh	North Somerset
Slop Bog	Dorset
Smallbrook Meadows	Wiltshire
Smestow Valley	Wolverhampton
Smith's Pool	Stoke-on-Trent
Smith's Wood	Solihull
Smithurst Meadows	Broxtowe
Smockmill Common	South Norfolk
Snakemoor	Buckinghamshire
Snibston Grange	Leicestershire
Snipe Dales	Lincolnshire
Somersham	Cambridgeshire
Sot's Hole	Sandwell
Sound Common	Cheshire East
South Bank of The Swale	Kent
South Landing, Flamborough	East Riding of Yorkshire
South Norwood Country Park	London Borough of Croydon
South Staffordshire Railway Walk	East Staffordshire and South Staffordshire
South Stanley Woods	Durham
South Taunton Streams (Mill, Galmington, Blackbrook 1&2)	Somerset
South Thoresby Warren	Lincolnshire
South Walsham Fen	Norfolk
South Wood	Medway
Southend-on-Sea Foreshore	Southend-on-Sea
Southern Washlands	Wakefield
Southorpe	East Riding of Yorkshire
Southrepps Common	Norfolk
Southway Valley	Plymouth
Southwell Trail	Nottinghamshire
Southwood Open Space	London Borough of Kingston upon Thames
Sparrow Wood	Kirklees
Spencer Road Wetlands	London Borough of Sutton
Spennells Valley	Wyre Forest
Spion Kop Cemetery	Hartlepool
Spring Lane Meadows	Colchester
Spring Wood and Millennium Wood, Belstead	Ipswich
Springfield Park	London Borough of Hackney
St Chad's Water	Draycott, Derbyshire
St Denis Church (footprint of church only)	South Cambridgeshire
St George's Flower Bank	North Somerset
St Gothian Sands	Cornwall
St Helen's Wood	Hastings
St John's Wood Church Grounds Nature Reserve	London Borough of Westminster
St Mary's Island	North Tyneside
St Nicholas Fields	York
St Wulstan's	Malvern Hills
Staffhurst Wood, Lingfield	Surrey
Stainton Quarry	Middlesbrough
Stanborough Reedmarsh	Welwyn Hatfield
Stanley Bank	St Helens
Stanley Marsh	Wakefield
Stanmer Park/Coldean	Brighton & Hove
Stanmore Common	London Borough of Harrow
Stanmore Country Park	London Borough of Harrow
Stanney Wood	Cheshire West and Chester
Stanpit Marsh, Christchurch	Bournemouth, Christchurch and Poole
Stanton Gate	Erewash
Stanton Park	Swindon
Stanton's Pit	Lincolnshire
Stapleford Hill Woodland	Broxtowe
Station Burn	South Tyneside
Steamer Point	Bournemouth, Christchurch and Poole
Steeley Hill, Cornsay Colliery	Durham
Steeple Woodland	Cornwall
Stenner Woods and Milgate Fields, Didsbury	Manchester
Stephens Castle	Dorset
Stillington Forest Park	Stockton-on-Tees
Stockers Lake	Three Rivers
Stockton Railway Cutting	Warwickshire
Stockwood Open Space	Bristol
Stoke Floods	Coventry
Stoke Park Wood	Ipswich
Stokes Field	Elmbridge
Stone Meadows	Stafford
Stonebridge Meadows	Coventry
Stony Clouds	Erewash
Storton's Pit	West Northamptonshire
Stotfold Mill Meadows	Central Bedfordshire
Stour Valley	Bournemouth, Christchurch and Poole
Stover	Devon
Street Heath	Somerset
Stubbins Park	Chinley Buxworth and Brownside
Sturt Pond	New Forest
Sudbury Common Lands	Babergh
Sue Godfrey Nature Park	London Borough of Lewisham
Sugar Loaf Hill and Saltern Cove	Torbay
Sugar Mill Ponds	East Riding of Yorkshire
Sugley Dene	Newcastle upon Tyne
Summer Leys	Northamptonshire
Summerfields Wood	Hastings
Summerhill	Hartlepool
Sun Lane	Bradford
Sunny Bank Ponds	Kirklees
Sunnybank	Sheffield
Sunnydale Park	Derby
Sunnyhurst Woods	Blackburn with Darwen
Sunrise Hill	Nottingham
Sutcliffe Park	Royal Borough of Greenwich
Sutherland Grange	Windsor & Maidenhead
Sutton Bonnington Spinney & Meadows	Rushcliffe
Sutton Ecology Centre Grounds	London Borough of Sutton
Swains	Somerset
Swallow Pond and Plantation	North Tyneside
Swallowfield Meadow	Swallowfield
Swanholme Lakes	Lincoln
Swanpool	Cornwall
Swift Valley	Rugby
Sydenham Hill Wood and Fern Bank	London Borough of Southwark
Tadburn Meadows	Test Valley
Tailby Meadow	North Northamptonshire
Tameside	Tamworth
Tanfield Lea Marsh	Durham
Target Hill Park	Crawley
Tavistock Viaduct Walk	West Devon
Telford Town Park	Telford & Wrekin
Temple Copse	Bracknell Forest
Ten Acre Woods and Meadows (part of Yeading Woods LNR)	London Borough of Hillingdon
Ten Shilling Wood	Coventry
Tenterfields	Dudley
Teversal/Pleasley Network	Ashfield
Thatcham Reed Beds	West Berkshire
Thatto Heath Meadows	St Helens
The Arran Trail	Blackburn with Darwen
The Beechwoods	Cambridgeshire
The Boardwalks	Peterborough
The Bottoms, Meden Vale	Mansfield
The Brooks (Bersted Brooks)	Arun
The Carrs (Market Warsop)	Mansfield
The Chase - Barking	London Borough of Barking and Dagenham
The Chase - Havering	London Borough of Havering
The Cliff (Kersal Dale)	Salford
The Commons	Welwyn Hatfield
The Dales Open Space	Ipswich
The Dell	North Yorkshire
The Ercall and Lawrence's Hill	Telford & Wrekin
The Flashes	Waverley
The Gullet	Windsor & Maidenhead
The Haven, Aldeburgh	East Suffolk
The Hermitage	Mansfield
The Hook	Rushcliffe
The Kench, Hayling Island	Hampshire
The Kittiwake Tower	Gateshead
The Lairage Land	Watford
The Maer	East Devon
The Manor	London Borough of Havering
The Mill Field	Basingstoke & Deane
The Moor	Durham
The Moors, Bishops Waltham	Hampshire
The Orchards	Leicester
The Pennings, Eye	Mid Suffolk
The Pingle	East Lindsey
The Quarr	Sherborne
The Railway Walks (4 parts): Rodbridge picnic site; Valley Walk; Lavenham Walk; Melford Walk	Suffolk
The Riddy	Sandy, Bedfordshire
The Sanctuary	Derby
The Scrase Valley	Mid Sussex
The Shrubberies	Lincolnshire
The Spinney, Carshalton	London Borough of Sutton
The Whinnies	Durham
The Wick	St Albans
The Wigan Flashes	Wigan
The Wild Grounds	Gosport
The Withey Beds	Three Rivers
The Wood and Richard Jefferies Bird Sanctuary	London Borough of Kingston upon Thames
Theaker Avenue	West Lindsey
Therfield Heath	North Hertfordshire
Thorncombe Wood	Dorset
Thornwood Common Flood Meadow	Epping Forest
Thorpe Wood	Stockton-on-Tees
Three Brooks	South Gloucestershire
Three Sisters	Wigan
Throckley and Walbottle Dene	Newcastle upon Tyne
Thurstaston Common	Wirral
Tiffield Pocket Park	Tiffield
Tiger Hill	Suffolk
Tile Hill Wood	Coventry
Tilesheds	South Tyneside
Tilgate Forest	Crawley
Tinkers Copse	Bracknell Forest
Tippings Wood	Nottinghamshir
Tiptree Parish Field	Colchester
Titchfield Haven	Hampshire
Titchmarsh	Northamptonshire
Tocil Wood and Meadow	Coventry
Toll's Meadow, Wymondham	Norfolk
Tong Moor	Kirklees
Top Field and Cozens Grove	Broxbourne
Toton Fields	Broxtowe
Totteridge Fields	London Borough of Barnet
Totternhoe Knolls	Central Bedfordshire
Tottington Wood	Horsham
Tower Hamlets Cemetery Park	London Borough of Tower Hamlets
Town End Common	Sheffield
Townclose Hills	Leeds
Trafford Ecology Park	Trafford
Trinity Hill	East Devon
Troopers Hill	Bristol
Trowbarrow Quarry	Lancaster
Trowell Marsh	Erewash
Tuckmill Meadows	Vale of White Horse
Tunstall Hills	Sunderland
Tupsley Quarry	Herefordshire
Turbary Common	Bournemouth, Christchurch and Poole
Turlin Moor	Bournemouth, Christchurch and Poole
Twerton Roundhill	Bath and North East Somerset
Tyler Hill Meadow	Canterbury
Ufton Fields	Warwickshire
Ulgham Meadow	Ulgham, Northumberland
Up Nately	Hampshire
Uphill Hill	North Somerset
Upper Ball Grove Lodge	Pendle
Upper Bradshaw Valley	Bolton
Upper Park Wood	Kirklees
Upton Country Park, Wakefield	Wakefield
Upton Towans	Cornwall
Valley Park Woodlands (Zionshill Copse 19.1 has.; Little Covert 1.7 has.)	Test Valley
Vange Hill	Basildon
Vernatts Drain	South Holland, Lincolnshire
Vicar Water Nature Reserve	Newark & Sherwood
Vinters Valley Park	Kent
Waddens Brook, Noose Lane, (Fibbersley)	Walsall
Wainbody Wood and Stivichall Common, Kenilworth Road Spinney	Coventry
Walborough Common	North Somerset
Walbottle Brickworks	Newcastle upon Tyne
Wallsend Dene	North Tyneside
Walnut Tree Field	Dorset
Walton Nature Park	Wakefield
Wandle Meadow Nature Park	London Borough of Merton
Wandle Valley Wetland	London Borough of Sutton
Wansbeck Riverside Park	Northumberland
Wapley Bushes	South Gloucestershire
Warndon Wood	Worcester
Warnham	Horsham
Warren Nature Reserve	Buckinghamshire
Warren Vale	Rotherham
Warren's Hall Country Park	Sandwell
Warsash Common	Fareham
Warton Crag	Lancaster
Warton Crag Quarry	Lancashire
Warwickshire Moor	Tamworth
Waseley Hills Country Park	Worcestershire
Water's Edge Country Park	North Lincolnshire
Watercress Wildlife Site	St Albans
Waterford Heath	East Hertfordshire
Waterhall	Brighton and Hove
Watermead Country Park - north	Leicestershire
Watermead Country Park - south	Leicester
Watford Lodge	Derbyshire
Watlington Chalk Pit	South Oxfordshire
Watnall Green	Broxtowe
Watnall Spinney	Broxtowe
Weald Common Flood Meadows	Epping Forest
Wealdon Edge Hangers	Hampshire
Weelsby Woods Park	North East Lincolnshire
Weirfield Riverside	Somerset
Weirwood Reservoir	East Sussex
Welches Meadow	Warwick
Welcome Hills & Clopton Park	Stratford-on-Avon
Well Wood	Wakefield
Wellington Basins	Somerset
Welsh Wood	Colchester
Wensum Valley (Mile Cross Marsh and Sycamore Crescent)	Norwich
Wessington Green	Wessington, Derbyshire
West Beach	Arun
West End Common	Elmbridge
West Haigh Wood	Barnsley
West Hayling	Havant
West Moors Woodlands	Dorset
West of the River Alver	Gosport
West Park Meadows	Derby
West Park, Uckfield	East Sussex
Westbere Copse	London Borough of Camden
Western Heights	Dover and Thanet
Weston Woods	North Somerset
Westport Lake	Stoke-on-Trent
Westwood Woodland Park	Hampshire
Weybourne	Waverley
Wharncliffe Heath	Sheffield
Wheata Woods	Sheffield
Wheathampstead	St Albans
Whet Mead	Braintree
Whinless Down	Dover
Whisby Nature Park	North Kesteven
Whitbarrow Scar	Lake District National Park Authority
Whitburn Point	South Tyneside
Whitby Park	Cheshire West and Chester
White Rose Lane	Woking
Whitecliff Wood	Redcar and Cleveland
Whitegrove Copse	Bracknell Forest
Whitehall Meadows	Canterbury
Whitehawk Hill	Brighton & Hove
Whiteleaf Hill	Buckinghamshire
Whitfield Valley	Stoke-on-Trent
Whitleigh Wood	Plymouth
Whitlingham Marsh	South Norfolk
Whitmoor and Rickford Commons	Surrey
Whitnash Brook	Warwick
Wick Golden Valley	South Gloucestershire
Widewater Lagoon	Adur
Wigg Island	Halton
Wild Park/Hollingbury	Brighton & Hove
Wilderness Island	London Borough of Sutton
Willenhall Wood	Coventry
Williamthorpe	Derbyshire
Willington North Dene	Durham
Willoughby Branch Line	Lincolnshire
Willsbridge Valley	South Gloucestershire
Wilwell Cutting	Rushcliffe
Windy Nook Nature Park	Gateshead
Wingate Quarry	Durham
Witham Way	Boston
Withdean & Westdene Woods	Brighton & Hove
Withnell Fold	Lancashire
Withnell Nature Reserve	Chorley
Wiveton Down	Norfolk
Wom Brook Walk	South Staffordshire
Woodbank Park	Stockport
Woodhouse Washlands	Sheffield
Woodland Wood Valley	Plymouth
Woodsetts Pond	Bassetlaw
Woodston Ponds	Peterborough
Woolley Wood	Sheffield
Wormwood Scrubs	London Borough of Hammersmith and Fulham
Worsbrough Country Park	Barnsley
Worsley Woods	Salford
Wrabness	Tendring
Wren's Nest	Dudley
Wyken Slough	Coventry
Wylam Haughs	Wylam, Northumberland
Wynyard Woodland Park (formerly Castle Eden Walkway)	Stockton-on-Tees
Wyrley and Essington Canal	South Staffordshire
Wythenshawe Park	Manchester
Yeading Brook Meadows	London Boroughs of Hillingdon and Ealing
Yeading Woods (inc Gutteridge Wood)	London Borough of Hillingdon
Yoell's Copse	Horndean, Hampshire
Yorks Wood	Solihull
Zebon Copse	Hampshire

== See also ==
- List of local nature reserves in Greater London
- List of local nature reserves in Scotland
- List of local nature reserves in Wales
