= Dorridge Wood =

Park in Solihull, West Midlands, England

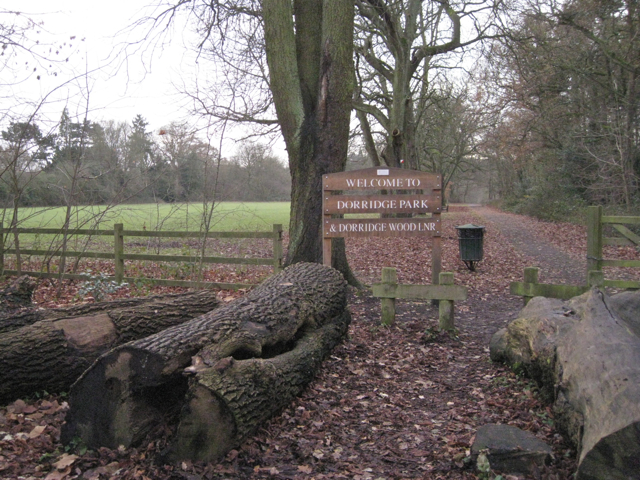
- Entrance to Dorridge Park from Arden Drive
- Interactive map of Dorridge Wood
- Type: Public park
- Location: Solihull, U.K.
- Coordinates: 52.3683°N 1.7499°W
- Area: 12 acres (4.9 ha).
- Created: 1969
- Operator: Solihull Council
- Status: Open year round

Dorridge Wood shown within the West Midlands

Dorridge Wood is a park and local nature reserve in Dorridge, Solihull, West Midlands. Established after a land donation in 1969, it incorporates a woodland area first mentioned in 1556. The park is home to many species of flora and fauna: Scots Pine, oak and ash trees, various wildflowers. Mammals including fox and vole have been sighted.

The open spaces around the woodlands are open to grass and include for football pitches and a children's playground.

== See also ==
- List of local nature reserves in England
