= Hilbert Woods =

Park in Kent, United Kingdom

Coordinates: 51.143°N 0.276°E

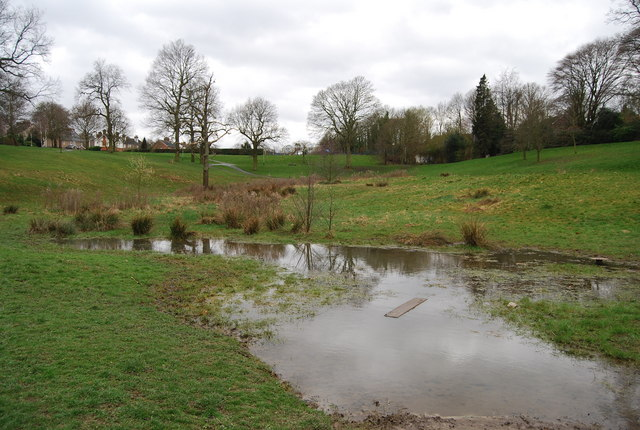
- Interactive map of Hilbert Woods
- Type: Local Nature Reserve
- Location: Tunbridge Wells, Kent
- OS grid: TQ 593 407
- Area: 14.3 hectares (35 acres)
- Manager: Kent High Weald Project and the Friends of Grosvenor and Hilbert Park

Hilbert Woods is a 14.3-hectare (35-acre) Local Nature Reserve in Tunbridge Wells in Kent. It is owned by Tunbridge Wells Borough Council and managed by Kent High Weald Project and the Friends of Grosvenor and Hilbert Park.

This gently sloping wood has oak, hazel and beech on the dry upper slopes, and alder on lower and wetter areas running down to a stream. The insect fauna is rich and diverse, including rare species.

There is access by a footpath from Sandhurst Park.
