= Lynchmere Commons =

Nature reserve in West Sussex, England

Coordinates: 51.072°N 0.768°W

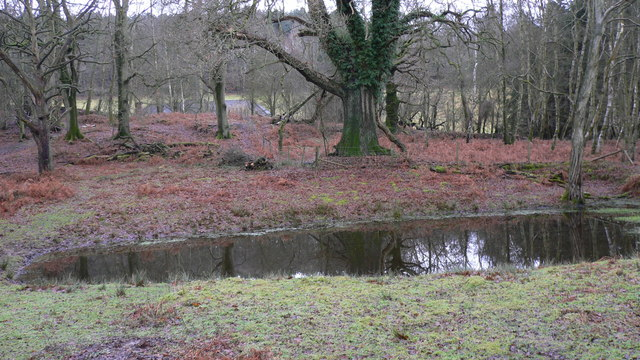
- Interactive map of Lynchmere Commons
- Type: Local Nature Reserve
- Location: Lynchmere, West Sussex
- OS grid: SU 864 310
- Area: 122 hectares (300 acres)

Lynchmere Commons is a 122-hectare (300-acre) Local Nature Reserve in Lynchmere in West Sussex. It is owned and managed by the Lynchmere Society.

This heathland site is composed of Stanley, Lynchmere and Marley Commons. They have diverse insect species and unusual plants such as bilberries.
