= Bure Park =

Nature reserve in Oxfordshire, England

Coordinates: 51.909°N 1.161°W

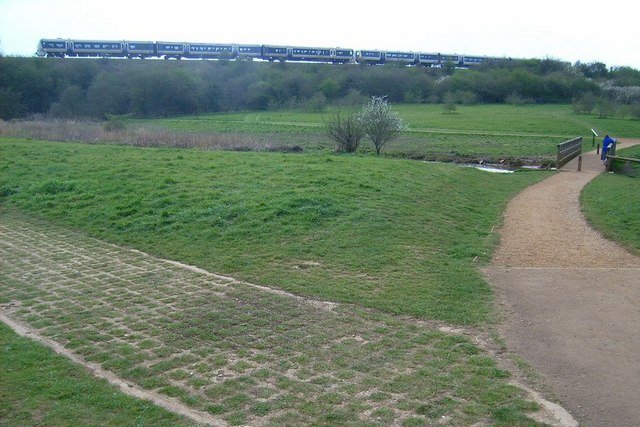
- Interactive map of Bure Park
- Type: Local Nature Reserve
- Location: Bicester, Oxfordshire
- OS grid: SP 578 237
- Area: 8.4 hectares (21 acres)
- Manager: Cherwell District Council

Bure Park is a 8.4-hectare (21-acre) Local Nature Reserve in Bicester in Oxfordshire. It is owned by Bicester Town Council and managed by Cherwell District Council.

The River Bure runs through the park and supplies water to a pond which has great crested newts. Habitats include grassland, scrub, broadleaved woodland and hedges.
