= Tyler Hill Meadow =

Nature reserve in Hackington, Kent, England

Coordinates: 51.308°N 1.065°E

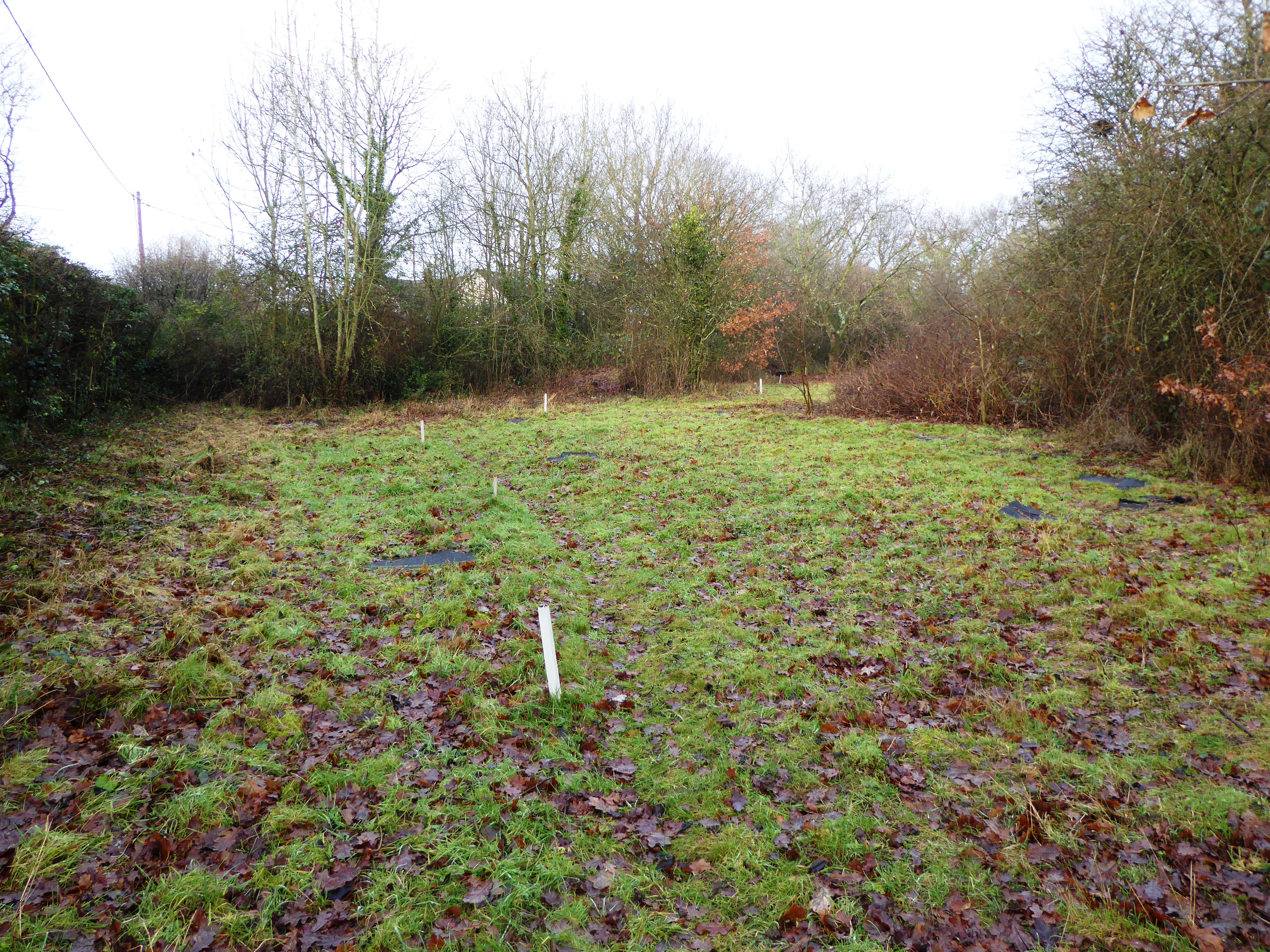
- Interactive map of Tyler Hill Meadow
- Type: Local Nature Reserve
- Location: Hackington, Kent
- OS grid: TR 137 610
- Area: 0.8 hectares (2.0 acres)
- Manager: Hackington Parish Council & Kentish Stour Countryside Project

Tyler Hill Meadow is a 0.8-hectare (2.0-acre) Local Nature Reserve in Hackington, north of Canterbury in Kent. It is owned by Hackington Parish Council and managed by the council together with the Kentish Stour Countryside Project.

The site has unimproved grassland, woodland and scrub. Reptiles include slow-worms and lizards, and eleven species of butterfly have been recorded.

There is access from Tyler Hill Road.
