= Buriton Chalk Pit =

Nature reserve in Hampshire, England

Coordinates: 50.973°N 0.955°W

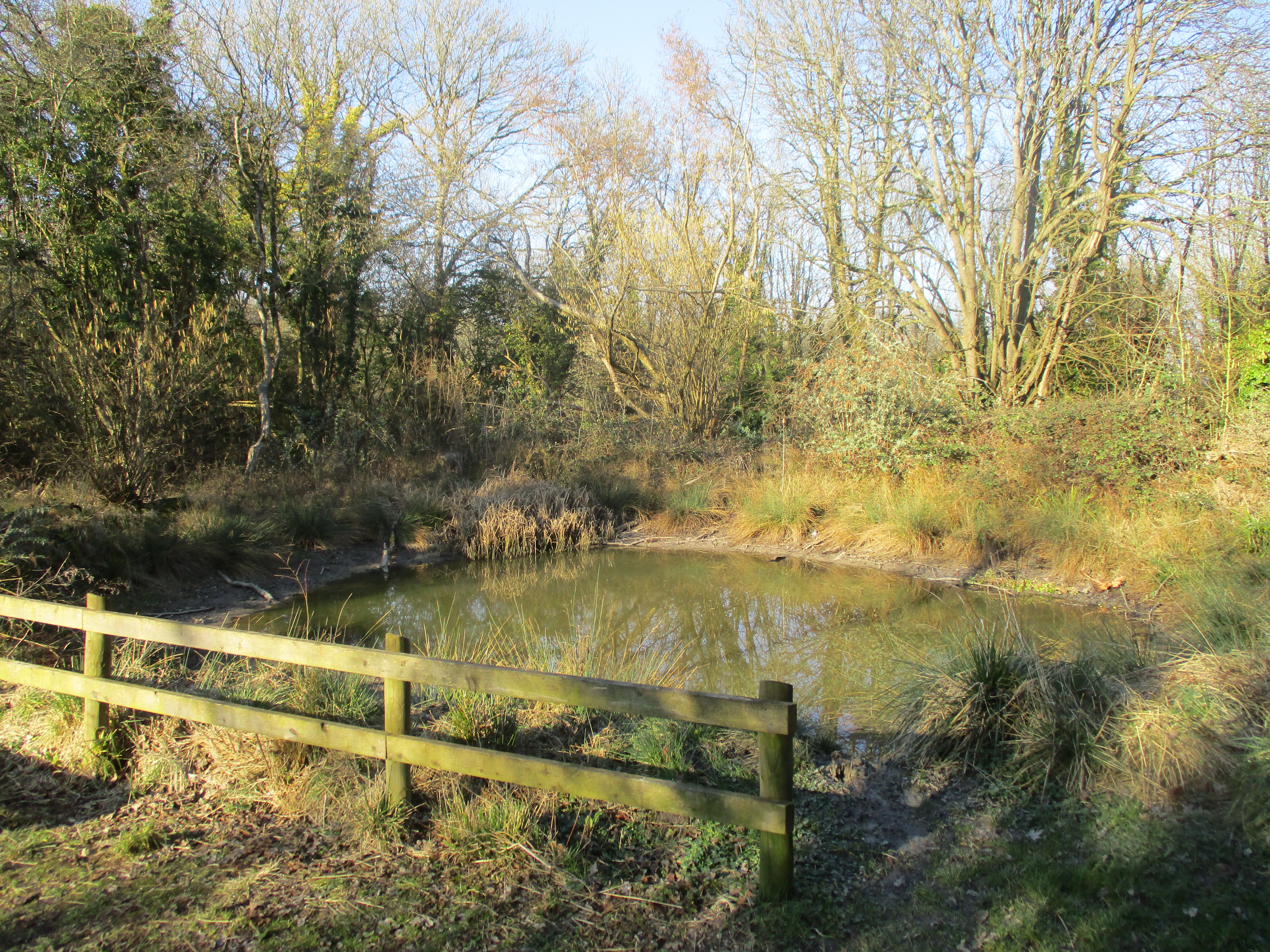
- Interactive map of Buriton Chalk Pit
- Type: Local Nature Reserve
- Location: Buriton, Hampshire
- OS grid: SU 735 198
- Area: 5.7 hectares (14 acres)
- Manager: Hampshire Countryside Service

Buriton Chalk Pit is a 5.7-hectare (14-acre) Local Nature Reserve near Buriton in Hampshire. It is owned by East Hampshire District Council and managed by Hampshire Countryside Service.

This former chalk quarry was worked up to the end of World War II and it still has large heaps of spoil. It has gradually developed into a rich habitat with chalk loving plants. Many paths follow the routes of narrow gauge railway lines which were used to move chalk and lime.
