= Martins Pond =

- Location within Massachusetts
- Location: Middlesex County, Massachusetts
- Coordinates: 42.615805°N 71.555832°W
- Type: lake

Martins Pond is a lake in Middlesex County, in the U.S. state of Massachusetts. The pond is located about one mile (1.6 km) northeast of Groton.

Martins Pond was named after William Martin, a pioneer citizen. A variant name is "Martin Pond".
