= St Gothian Sands =

Nature reserve in Cornwall, England

Coordinates: 50.22677°N 5.38731°W

St Gothian Sands (grid reference SW585418) is a Local Nature Reserve near Gwithian, Cornwall. It was declared a Local Nature Reserve in 2005 by the Penwith District Council.
