= Baty's Marsh =

Nature reserve in Kent, England

Coordinates: 51.377°N 0.484°E

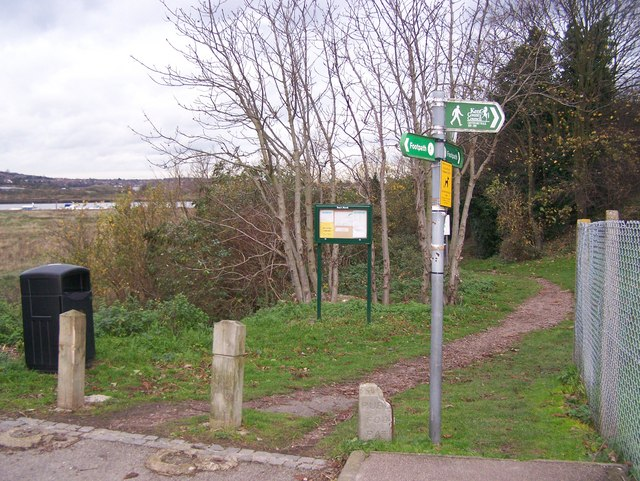
- Interactive map of Baty's Marsh
- Type: Local Nature Reserve
- Location: Rochester, Kent
- OS grid: TQ 730 672
- Area: 10.4 hectares (26 acres)
- Manager: Medway Council

Baty's Marsh is a 10.4-hectare (26-acre) Local Nature Reserve in Rochester in Kent. It is owned and managed by Medway Council.

This is one of the few remaining salt marshes in the Medway area, and it has a rich fauna, especially wading birds.

There is access from Manor Lane.
