= Bus Company Island =

Park in Canterbury, Kent, United Kingdom

Coordinates: 51.283°N 1.080°E

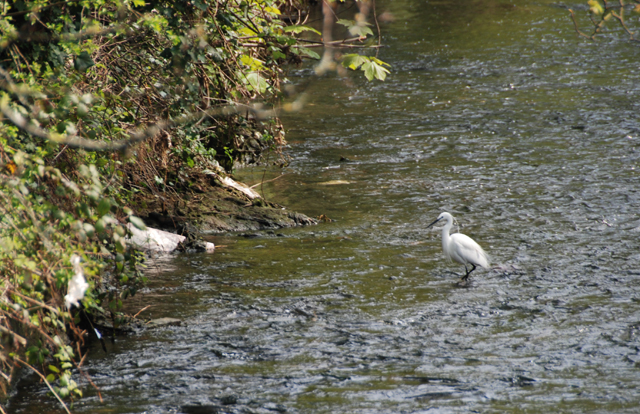
- Interactive map of Bus Company Island
- Type: Local Nature Reserve
- Location: Canterbury, Kent
- OS grid: TR 149 583
- Area: 1.1 hectares (2.7 acres)
- Manager: Canterbury City Council

Bus Company Island is a 1.1-hectare (2.7-acre) Local Nature Reserve in Canterbury in Kent. It is owned and managed by Canterbury City Council.

The island is important as a reptile monitoring site. It was formerly a watermill, and then a bus park. It is now a meadow and orchard.

Access is by permit only.
