= Ewelme Watercress Beds =

Nature reserve in Oxfordshire, England

Coordinates: 51.621°N 1.078°W

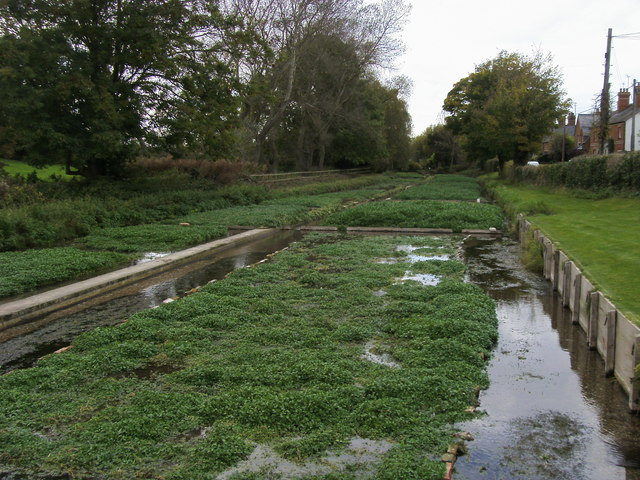
- Interactive map of Ewelme Watercress Beds
- Type: Local Nature Reserve
- Location: Ewelme, Oxfordshire
- OS grid: SU 639 917
- Area: 2.6 hectares (6.4 acres)
- Manager: Chiltern Society & The Friends of Ewelme Watercress Beds

Ewelme Watercress Beds is a 2.6-hectare (6.4-acre) Local Nature Reserve in Ewelme in Oxfordshire. It is owned and managed by the Chiltern Society.

A stream runs through these former watercress beds, fed by a spring. Wildlife includes water voles, together with diverse invertebrates and plants.
