= Daneshill Park Woods =

Nature reserve in Hampshire, England

Coordinates: 51.280°N 1.059°W

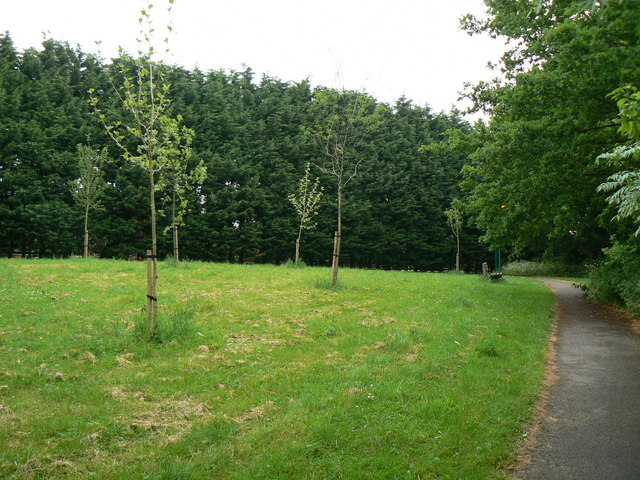
- Interactive map of Daneshill Park Woods
- Type: Local Nature Reserve
- Location: Basingstoke, Hampshire
- OS grid: SU 657 538
- Area: 4.4 hectares (11 acres)
- Manager: Basingstoke and Deane Borough Council

Daneshill Park Woods is a 4.4-hectare (11-acre) Local Nature Reserve in Basingstoke in Hampshire. It is owned and managed by Basingstoke and Deane Borough Council.

These woods have hazel coppice, an old orchard, scrub and a sunken lane. Ground flora include wood anemone, celandine and bluebells.
