= Cuckoo Wood =

Nature reserve in Essex, United Kingdom

Coordinates: 51.8615°N 0.51969°E

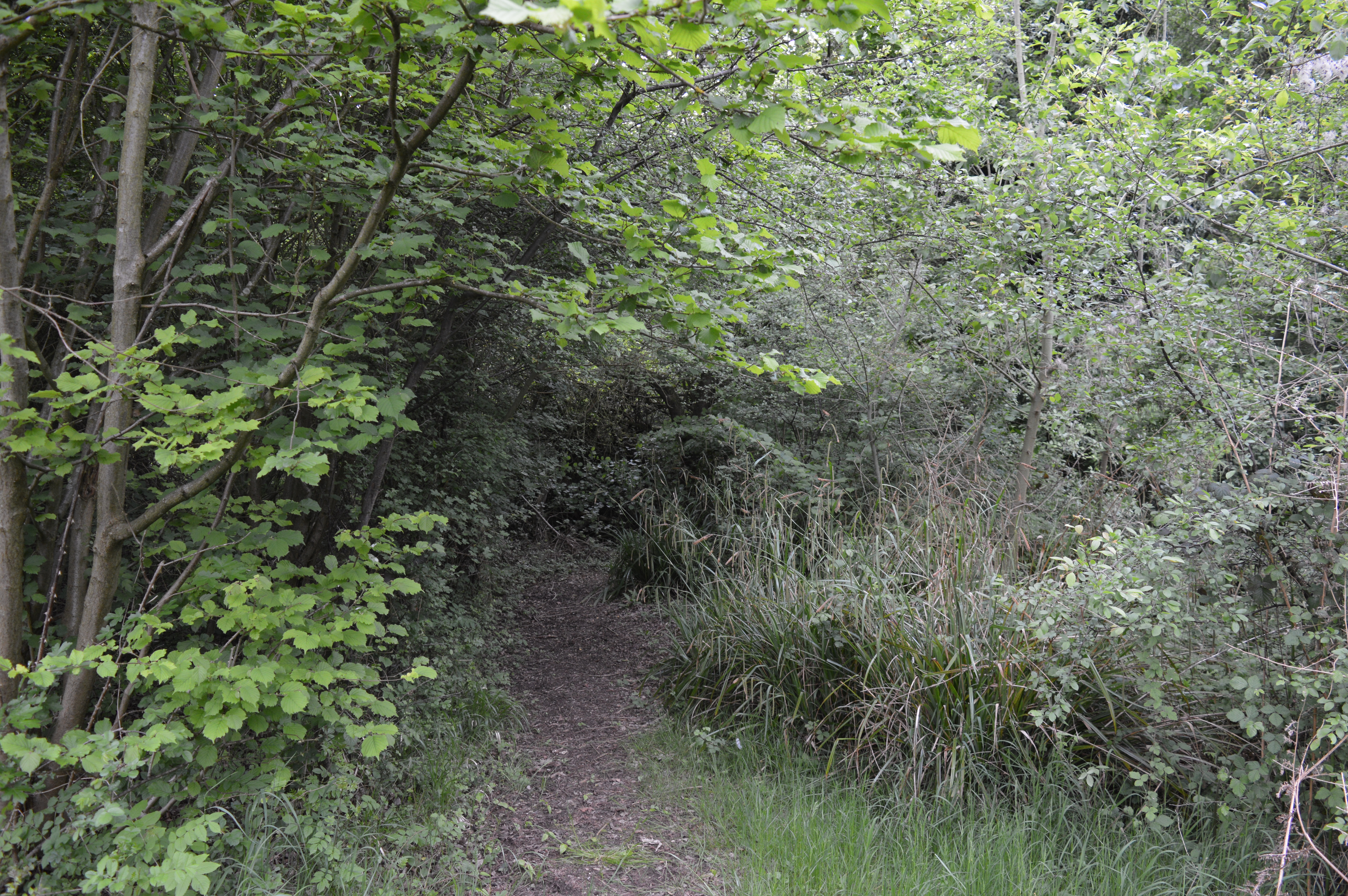
- Interactive map of Cuckoo Wood
- Type: Local Nature Reserve
- Location: Braintree, Essex
- OS grid: TL736211
- Area: 2.5 hectares (6.2 acres)
- Manager: Essex County Council

Cuckoo Wood is a 2.5 hectare Local Nature Reserve in Braintree in Essex. It is owned by Braintree District Council and managed by Essex County Council as an educational resource.

The site has amenity grassland, meadows, woods, lakes, ponds, ditches and hedgerows. It has some locally rare species, and is described by Natural England as a very good habitat for fungi, due to a large amount of dead wood.

The site is not open to the public.
