= Pickers Ditch Meadow =

Nature reserve in Clacton-on-Sea, England

Coordinates: 51.810°N 1.1590°E

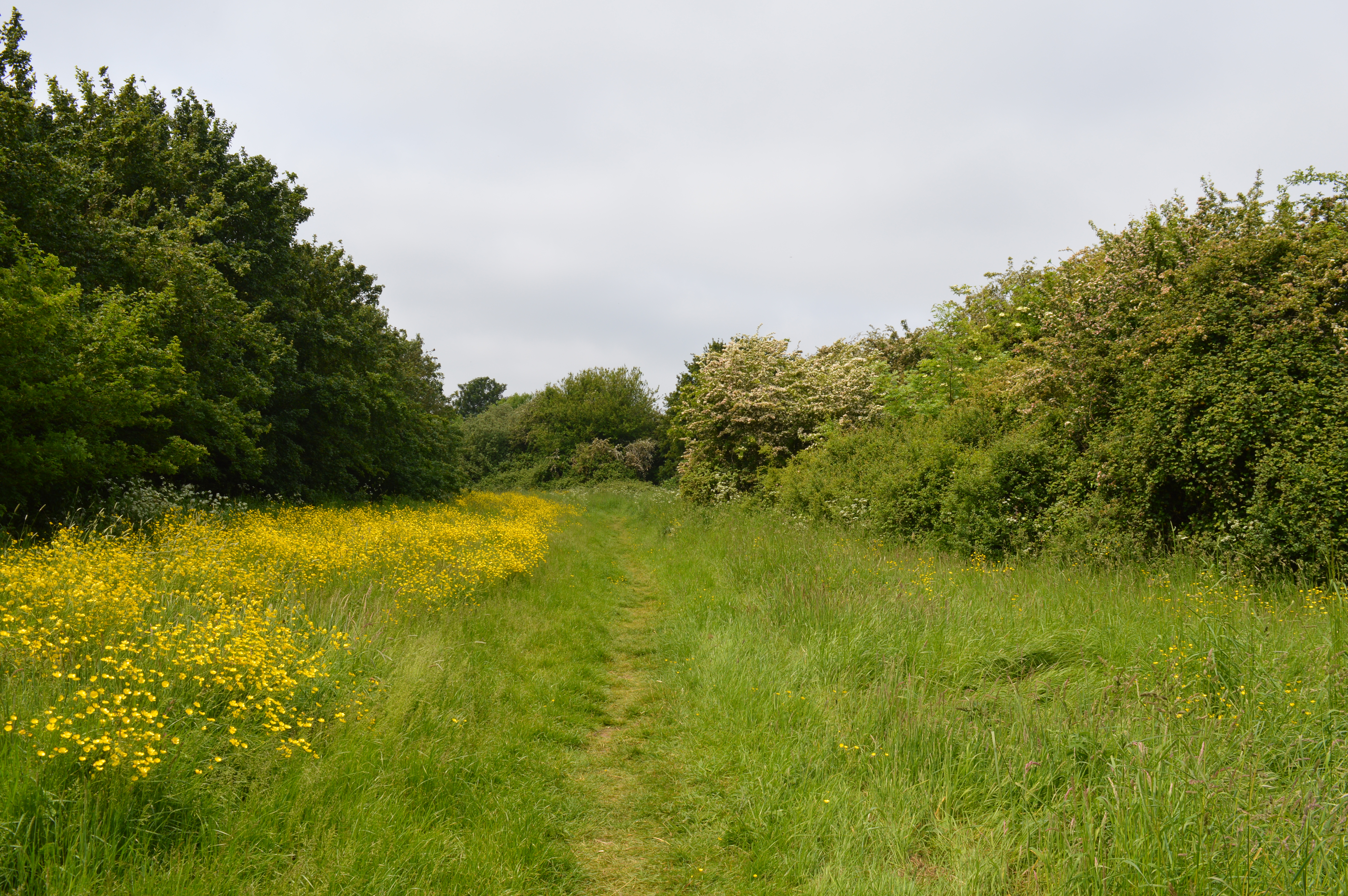
- Interactive map of Pickers Ditch Meadow
- Type: Local Nature Reserve
- Location: Clacton-on-Sea, Essex
- OS grid: TM178171
- Area: 1.9 hectares (4.7 acres)
- Manager: Tendring District Council

Pickers Ditch Meadow is a 1.9 hectare Local Nature Reserve in Clacton-on-Sea in Essex. It is owned and managed by Tendring District Council.

The site runs along the bank of Pickers Ditch, a tributary of Holland Brook. A footpath runs through the grassland site, and hedges have been planted along the border to screen it.

There is access from Thorpe Road.
