= Blunts Wood and Paiges Meadow =

Nature reserve in West Sussex

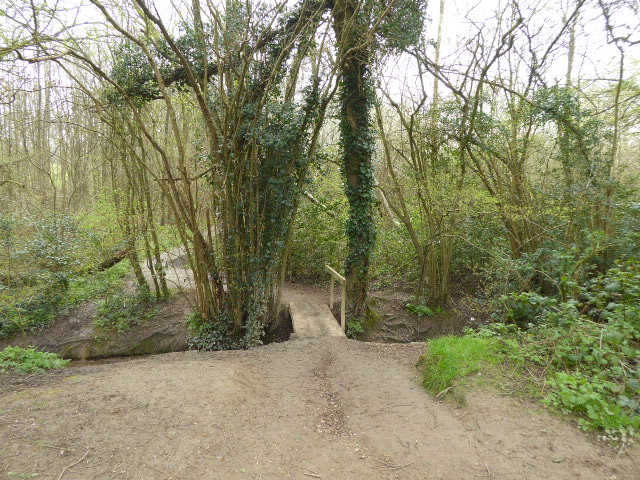
- Interactive map of Blunts Wood and Paiges Meadow
- Type: Local Nature Reserve
- Location: Haywards Heath, West Sussex
- OS grid: TQ 317 244
- Area: 28.9 hectares (71 acres)
- Manager: Mid Sussex District Council

Blunts Wood and Paiges Meadow is a 28.9-hectare (71-acre) local nature reserve in Haywards Heath in West Sussex. It is owned and managed by Mid Sussex District council.

This site has diverse habitats with a pond, wetland, hedgerows, grassland, birch woodland, hazel coppice, mixed coppice and bluebell woodland.
