= Howe Dell =

Nature reserve in Hertfordshire, England

Coordinates: 51.7572°N 0.2222°W

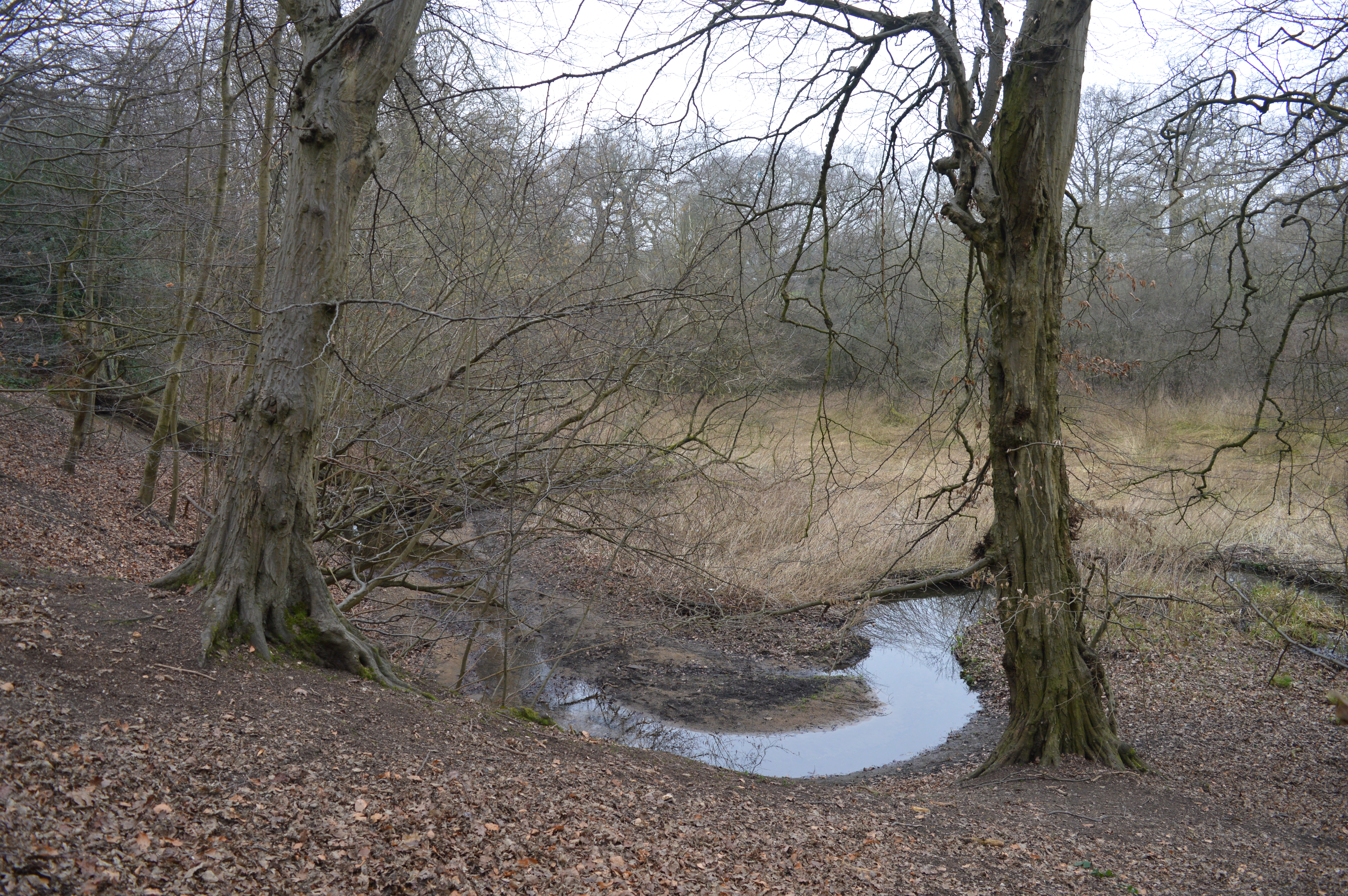

Howe Dell is a 4 hectare Local Nature Reserve in Hatfield in Hertfordshire. The declaring authority is Welwyn Hatfield Borough Council. The site is woodland which runs along both sides of a stream with steep sides. The main trees are hornbeam, oak and beech. There is access from Honeysuckle Gardens.
