= Foxes Cross Bottom =

Nature reserve in the United Kingdom

Coordinates: 51.332°N 1.003°E

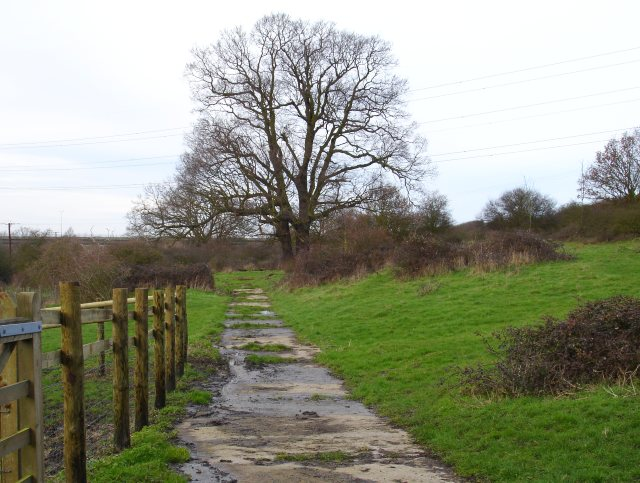
- Interactive map of Foxes Cross Bottom
- Type: Local Nature Reserve
- Location: Whitstable, Kent
- OS grid: TR 093 635
- Area: 4.0 hectares (9.9 acres)
- Manager: Canterbury City Council

Foxes Cross Bottom is a 4-hectare (9.9-acre) Local Nature Reserve north-west of Whitstable in Kent. It is owned and managed by Canterbury City Council.

This site has diverse habitats of grassland, scrub, broadleaved woodland, ponds, ditches and hedges. The meadows are grazed by ponies and highland cattle.

There is public access to the site.
