= Church Meadow =

Park in Suffolk, United Kingdom

Coordinates: 52.173°N 0.997°E

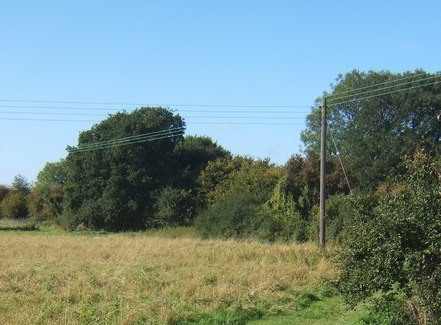
- Interactive map of Church Meadow
- Type: Local Nature Reserve
- Location: Stowmarket, Suffolk
- OS grid: TM 050570
- Area: 3.8 hectares (9.4 acres)
- Manager: Mid Suffolk District Council

Church Meadow is a 3.8 hectare Local Nature Reserve on the southern outskirts of Stowmarket in Suffolk. It is owned and managed by Mid Suffolk District Council.

This was formerly the garden of Combs Hall, which was demolished in 1756. Surviving features include earth banks and a round pond, which has frogs, newts toads and many dragonflies. The meadow is grazed by sheep.

There is access from Church Road.
