= Harebreaks Wood =

Local Nature Reserve in Hertfordshire, England

Coordinates: 51.6808°N 0.4089°W

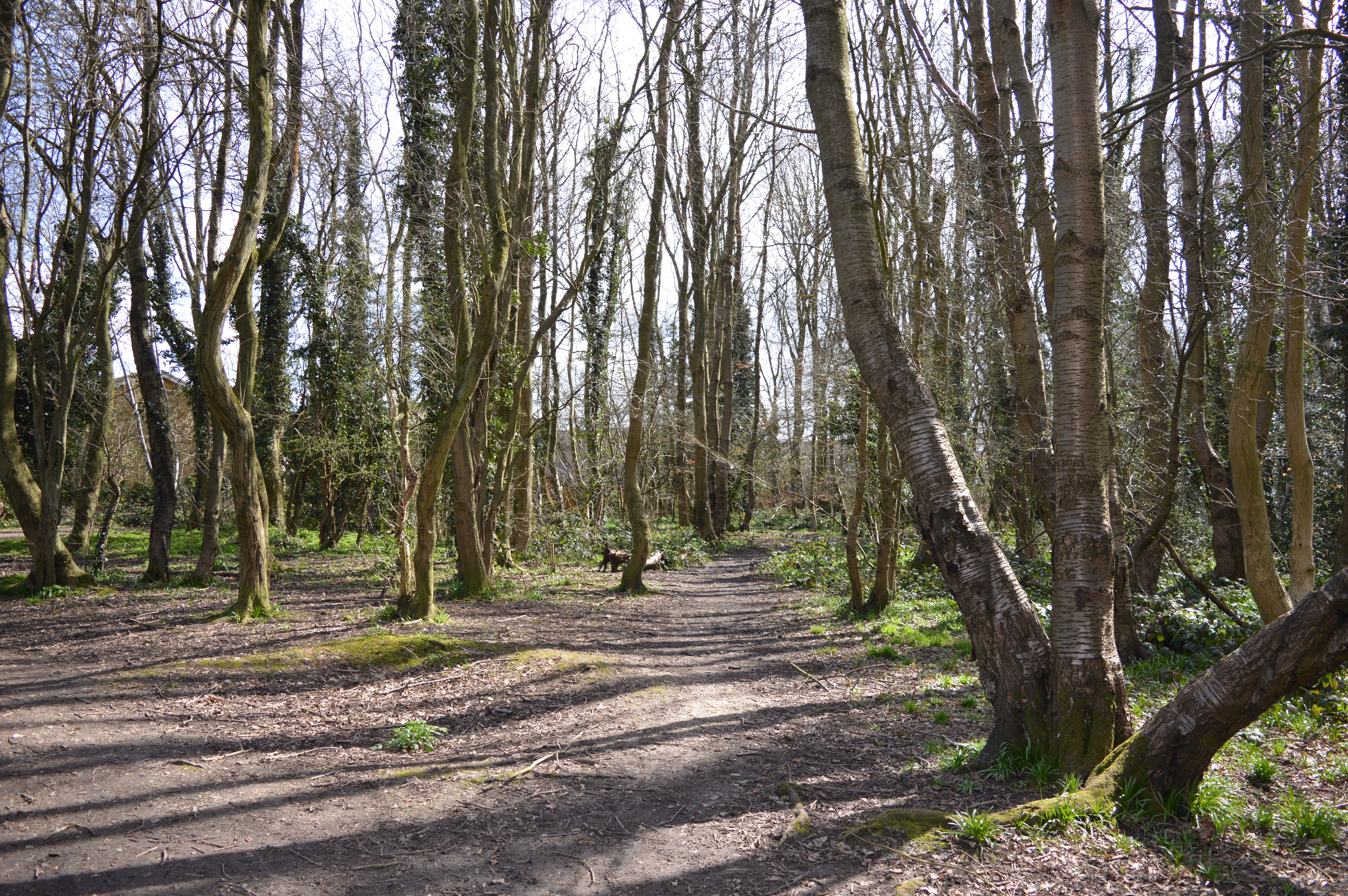

Harebreaks Wood is 5.1 hectare Local Nature Reserve in Watford in Hertfordshire. It is owned by Watford Borough Council and managed by the council and the Friends of Harebreaks Wood.

The site is semi-natural woodland of oak, ash and cherry, which goes back to at least 1600. It is a remnant of a much larger wood known in the nineteenth century as Longspring and Leggatts Wood, and was grazed by livestock. Birds include great-spotted woodpecker, treecreeper and nuthatch, and there mammals such as muntjac deer and pipistrelle bats.

There is access from Leggatts Way and The Harebreaks.
