= The Commons, Welwyn Garden City =

Nature reserve in Hertfordshire, UK

Coordinates: 51.7835°N 0.1762°W

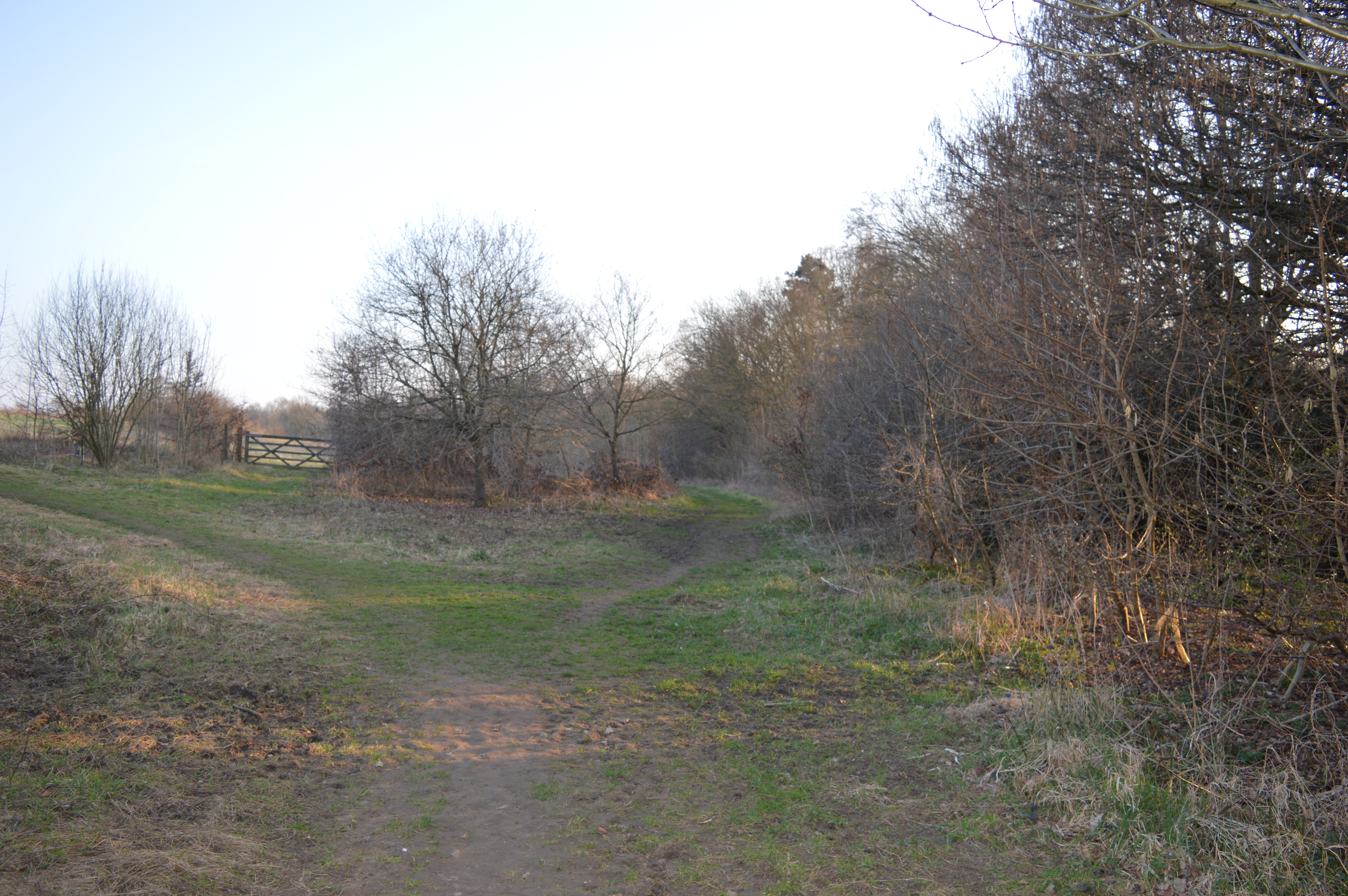

The Commons is 13.2 hectare Local Nature Reserve in Welwyn Garden City in Hertfordshire. It is owned and managed by Welwyn Hatfield Borough Council.

The site has a variety of habitats including oak woodland, flower-rich meadows, wet fens, ditches and ponds. The Countryside Stewardship Scheme funds improvements of hedge laying, provision of winter feed for farmland birds, and provision of fencing for grazing livestock. Much of the work is done by volunteers.

There is access from the road called The Commons.
