= West of the River Alver =

Nature reserve in Hampshire, England

Coordinates: 50.798°N 1.178°W

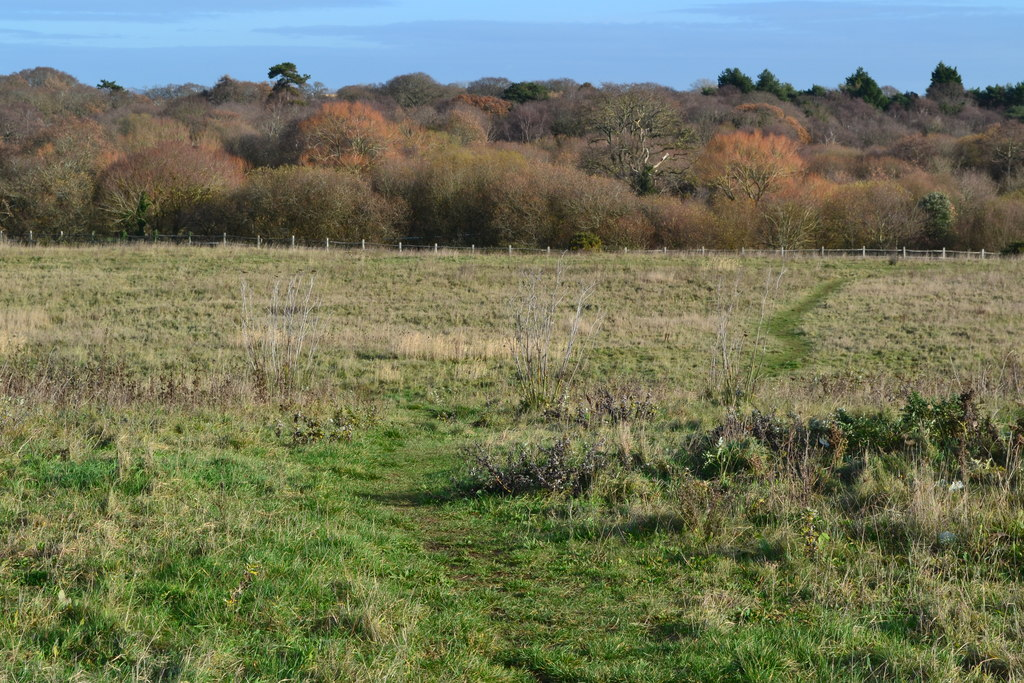
- Interactive map of West of the River Alver
- Type: Local Nature Reserve
- Location: Gosport, Hampshire
- OS grid: SU 580 001
- Area: 11.6 hectares (29 acres)
- Manager: Gosport Borough Council

West of the River Alver is an 11.6-hectare (29-acre) Local Nature Reserve in Gosport in Hampshire. It is owned and managed by Gosport Borough Council.

This site on the west bank of the River Alver has a reedbed which is one of the largest in England, and which is maintained by annual cutting. There are also three ponds and areas of grassland, some of which are kept short by rabbit grazing. Seventeen species of butterfly have been recorded.
