= Vinters Valley Park =

Local Nature Reserve in Kent, England

Coordinates: 51.278°N 0.545°E

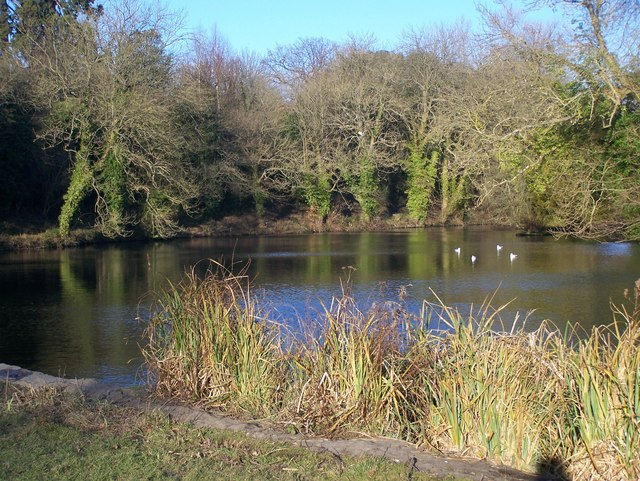
- Interactive map of Vinters Valley Park
- Type: Local Nature Reserve
- Location: Maidstone, Kent
- OS grid: TQ 776 563
- Area: 30.2 hectares (75 acres)
- Manager: Vinters Valley Trust

Vinters Valley Park is a 30.2-hectare (75-acre) Local Nature Reserve in Maidstone in Kent. It is owned by Kent County Council and Maidstone Borough Council and managed by the Vinters Valley Trust.

This park has diverse habitats with grassland, woods, marshes, scrub, a lake and a stream. Birds include ducks, geese and kingfishers.

Access points include entrances in New Cut Road, Lodge Road and Bargrove Road.
