= Rotherlands =

Nature reserve in Hampshire, England

Coordinates: 51.008°N 0.911°W

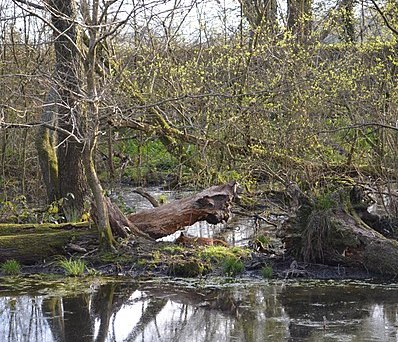
- Interactive map of Rotherlands
- Type: Local Nature Reserve
- Location: Petersfield, Hampshire
- OS grid: SU 765 237
- Area: 7.6 hectares (19 acres)
- Manager: Rotherlands Conservation Group

Rotherlands is a 7.6-hectare (19-acre) Local Nature Reserve in Petersfield in Hampshire. It is owned by Petersfield Town Council and managed by Rotherlands Conservation Group.

The River Rother and its tributary, Tilmore Brook, runs through this reserve, and it also has unmanaged grassland, wetland, woodland and scrub. Fauna include badgers, otters and crayfish.
