= Bassleton Wood and The Holmes =

Local nature reserve in England

Coordinates: 54.536°N 1.321°W

Bassleton Wood and The Holmes is a Local Nature Reserve in the town of Thornaby-on-Tees, in the borough of Stockton-on-Tees, England.

Bassleton Wood is an ancient woodland. The Holmes follows the course of the River Tees and provides a haven for wildlife such as roe deer have been seen within the nature reserve. Within The Holmes there is a wildlife pond that features some of the most rare species in northern England.
