= Scraptoft Nature Reserve =

Nature reserve near Leicester, England

Coordinates: 52.649°N 1.044°W

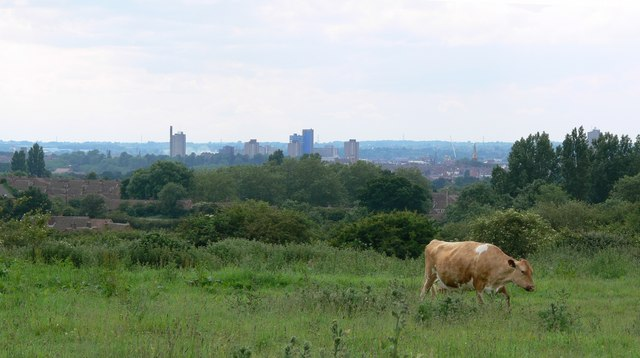
- Interactive map of Scraptoft Nature Reserve
- Type: Local Nature Reserve
- Location: Scraptoft, Leicestershire
- OS grid: SK 648 061
- Area: 14.3 hectares (35 acres)
- Manager: Leicester City Council

Scraptoft Nature Reserve is a 14.3 hectares (35 acres) Local Nature Reserve in Scraptoft, on the eastern outskirts of Leicester. It is owned and managed by Leicester City Council.

This former Second World War prisoner of war camp has habitats including a pond, semi-improved grassland and mature hawthorn scrub. Scraptoft Brook runs along the southern boundary.

There is access to the site from Beeby Road.
