= Ambley Wood =

Local nature reserve in Kent, England

Coordinates: 51.361°N 0.573°E

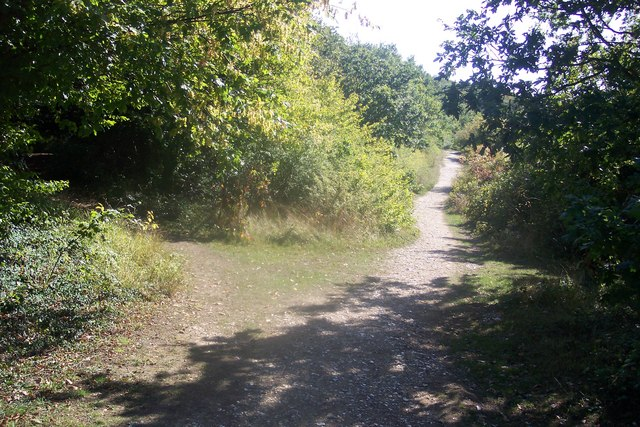
- Interactive map of Ambley Wood
- Type: Local Nature Reserve
- Location: Gillingham, Kent
- OS grid: TQ 792 656
- Area: 14.0 hectares (35 acres)
- Manager: Medway Council

Ambley Wood is a 14-hectare (35-acre) Local Nature Reserve in Gillingham in Kent. It is owned and managed by Medway Council.

The site has ancient woodland with typical woodland flora.

There is access from Ambley Road
