= Moreton Hall Community Woods =

Nature reserve in Suffolk, England

Coordinates: 52.248°N 0.733°E

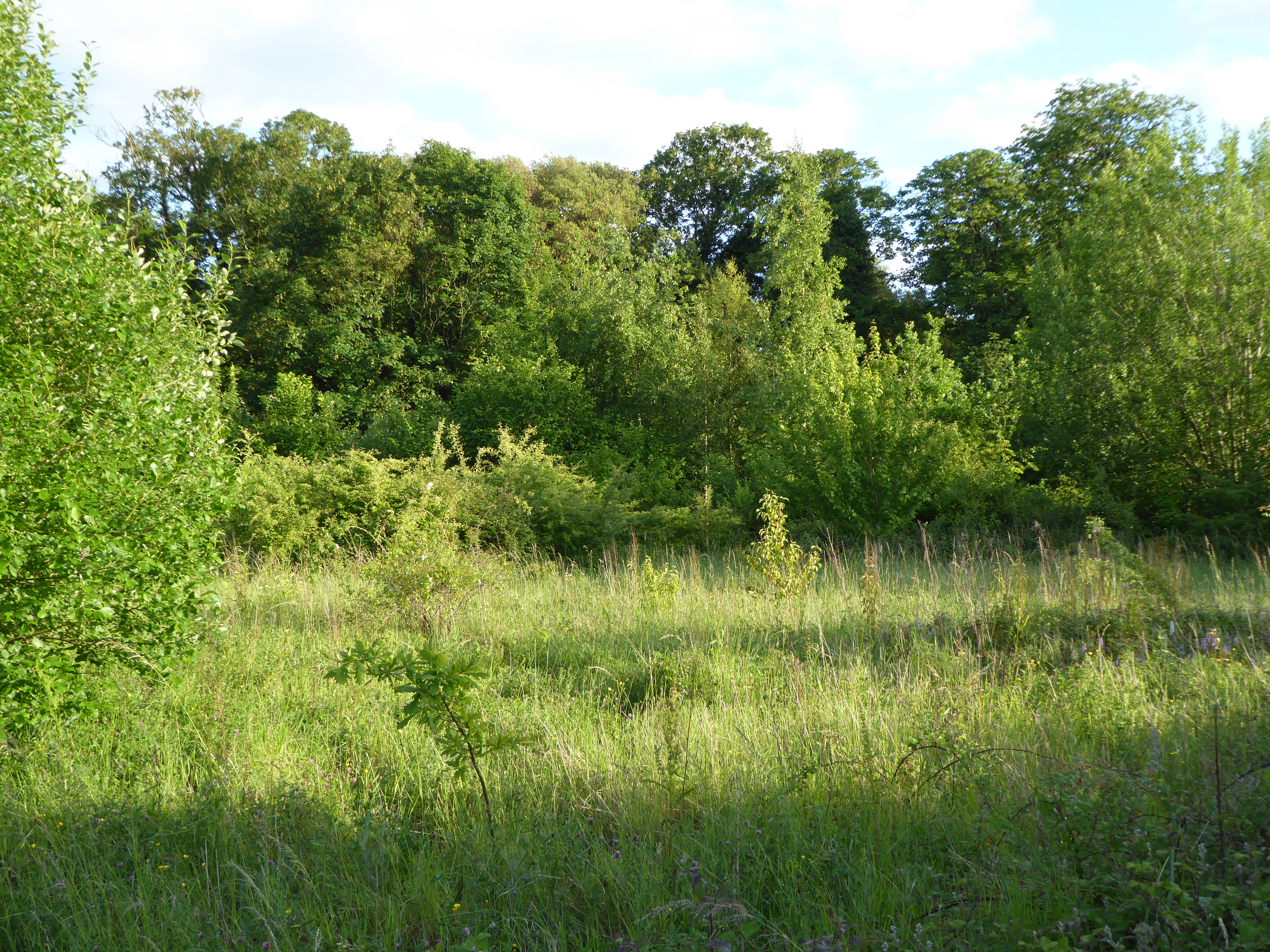
- Interactive map of Moreton Hall Community Woods
- Type: Local Nature Reserve
- Location: Bury St Edmunds, Suffolk
- OS grid: TL 867 646
- Area: 18.5 hectares (46 acres)
- Manager: Woodland Ways

Moreton Hall Community Woods is an 18.5 hectare local nature reserve in Bury St Edmunds in Suffolk. it is owned by West Suffolk Council and managed by Woodland Ways.

This site in six separate nearby areas has woodland, grassland, a pond, paths and cycleways.

Access points include Kingsworth Road and Symonds Road
