= Bishop's Meadow =

Nature reserve, near Loughborough, Leicestershire

Coordinates: 52.792°N 1.217°W

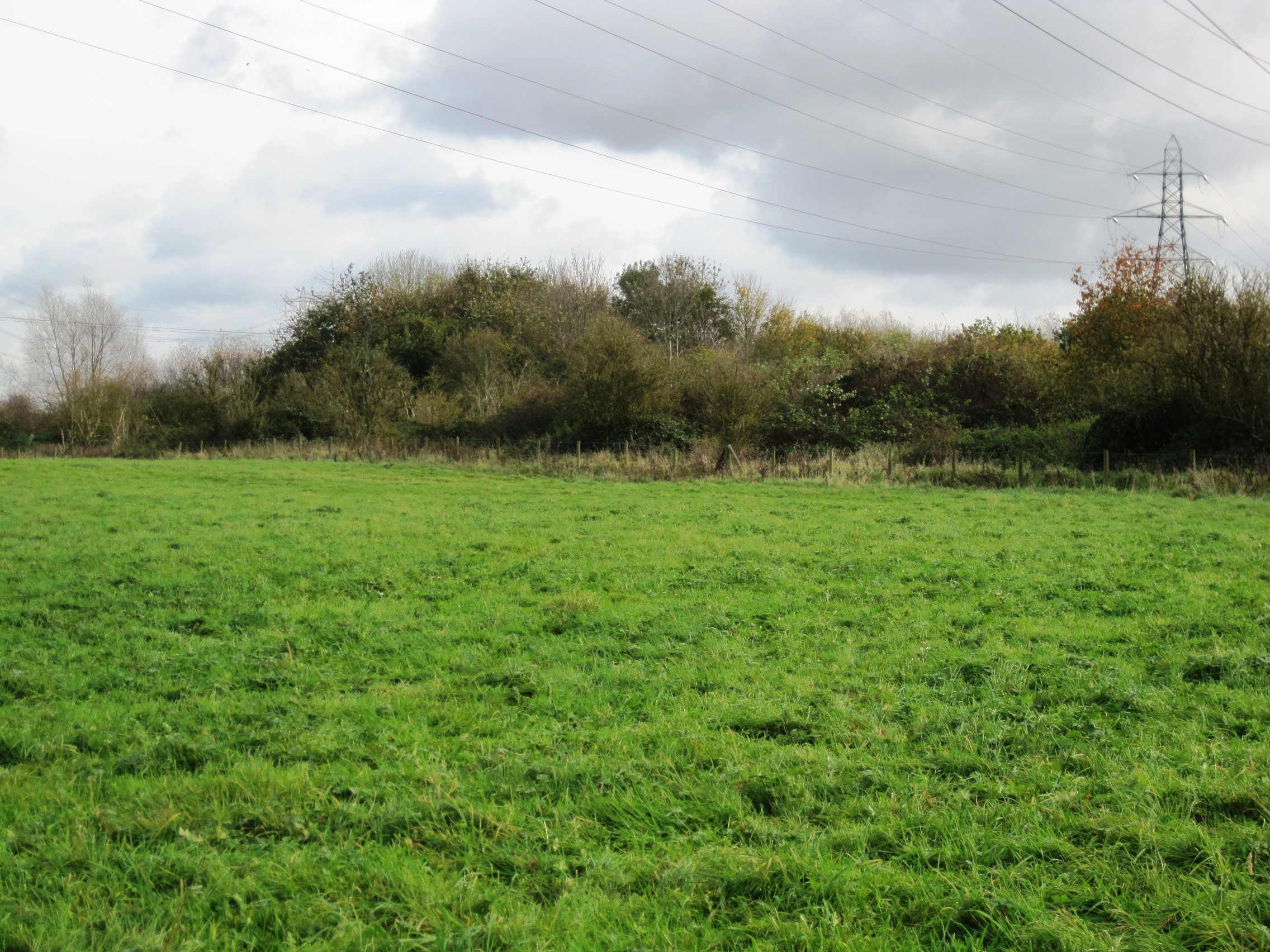
- Interactive map of Bishop's Meadow
- Type: Local Nature Reserve
- Location: Loughborough, Leicestershire
- OS grid: SK 529 219
- Area: 21.8 hectares (54 acres)
- Manager: Charnwood Borough Council

Bishop's Meadow is a 21.8 hectare Local Nature Reserve on the northern outskirts of Loughborough in Leicestershire. It is owned and managed by Charnwood Borough Council.

This area of grassland, swamp and fen has mature beech trees, a diverse flora, fungi and bryophytes. The River Soar runs along its northern boundary.

There is no public access.
