= Axholme Line–Haxey =

Nature reserve in North Lincolnshire, United Kingdom

- Interactive map of Axholme Line–Haxey
- Type: Local Nature Reserve
- Location: Haxey, North Lincolnshire
- OS grid: SE 771 012
- Area: 7.23 hectares (17.9 acres)
- Manager: North Lincolnshire Council

Axholme Line–Haxey is a 7.23-hectare Local Nature Reserve near the town of Haxey in North Lincolnshire. It is owned and managed by North Lincolnshire Council. It is composed of neutral calcareous grassland encompassing a stretch of the disused Axholme Joint Railway which runs from Haxey to land adjacent to Low Burnham. The site can be accessed by the public opposite Haxey Primary School.
