= Popley Ponds =

Nature reserve in Hampshire, England

Coordinates: 51.286°N 1.087°W

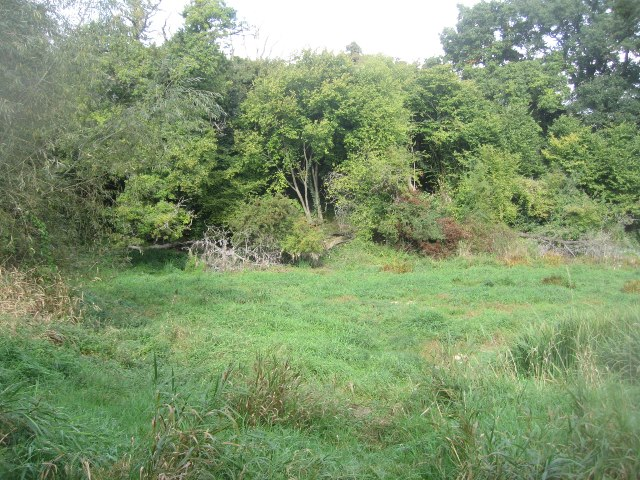
- Interactive map of Popley Ponds
- Type: Local Nature Reserve
- Location: Basingstoke, Hampshire
- OS grid: SU 638 545
- Area: 1.4 hectares (3.5 acres)
- Manager: Basingstoke and Deane Borough Council

Popley Ponds is a 1.4-hectare (3.5-acre) Local Nature Reserve in Basingstoke in Hampshire. It is owned and managed by Basingstoke and Deane Borough Council.

This former quarry is now a pond which has a diverse range of amphibians, including great crested newts. There is also an area of woodland.
