= Litcham Common =

Nature reserve in Norfolk, United Kingdom

Coordinates: 52.718°N 0.789°E

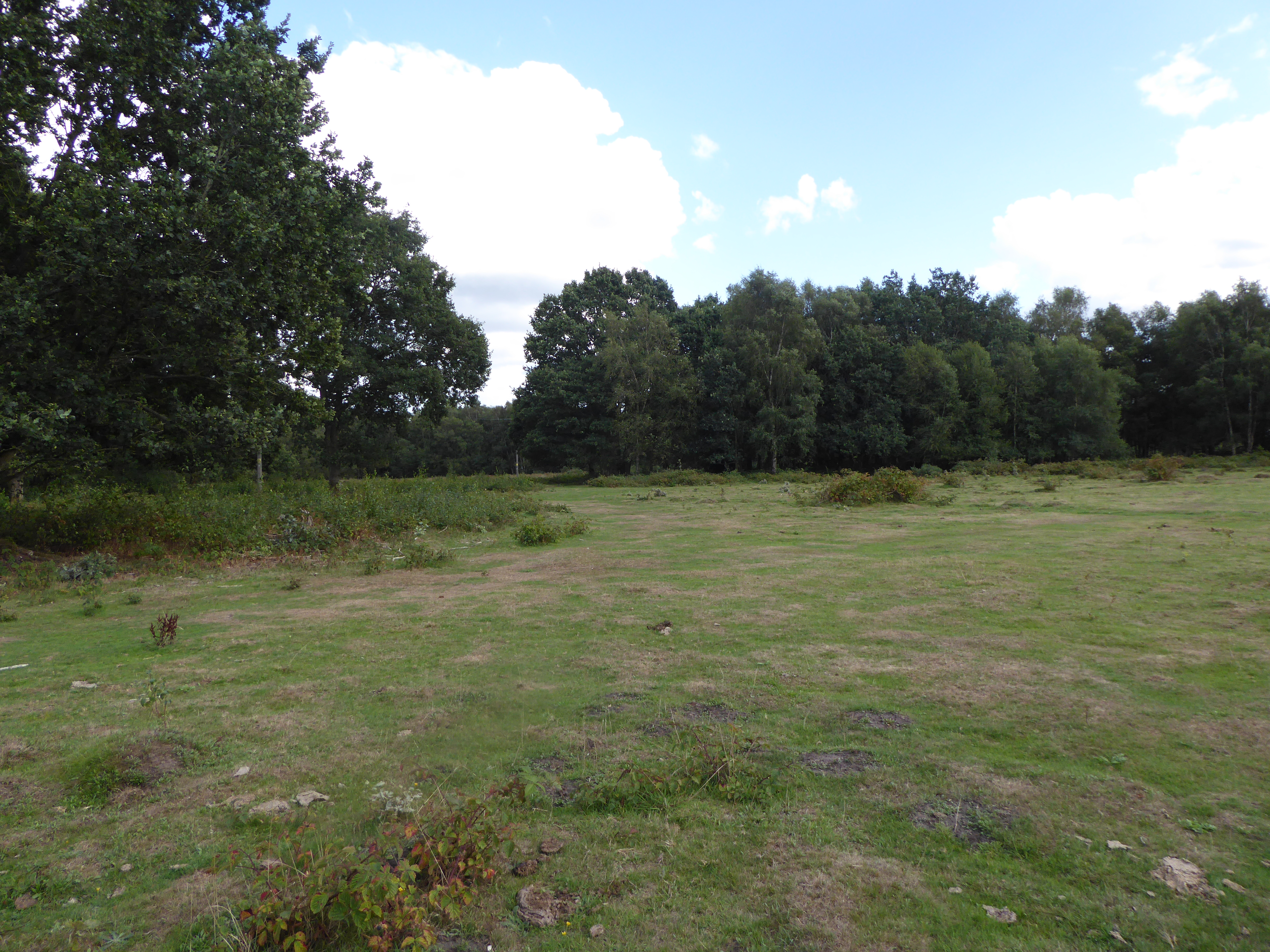
- Interactive map of Litcham Common
- Type: Local Nature Reserve
- Location: Litcham, Norfolk
- OS grid: TF 885 170
- Area: 24.9 hectares (62 acres)
- Manager: Norfolk County Council, Lexham Estate and the Department for Environment, Food and Rural Affairs

Litcham Common is a 24.9-hectare (62-acre) Local Nature Reserve in Norfolk. It is owned by Neil Foster, Lexham Estate, and managed by Norfolk County Council, Lexham Estate and the Department for Environment, Food and Rural Affairs.

This heathland site has areas of acid grassland, wet and dry heath, scrub and mature oak and birch woodland.

There is access from Dunham Road and the Nar Valley Way, which both go through the common.
