= Glamis Meadow and Wood =

Nature reserve in Northamptonshire, United Kingdom

Coordinates: 52.308°N 0.708°W

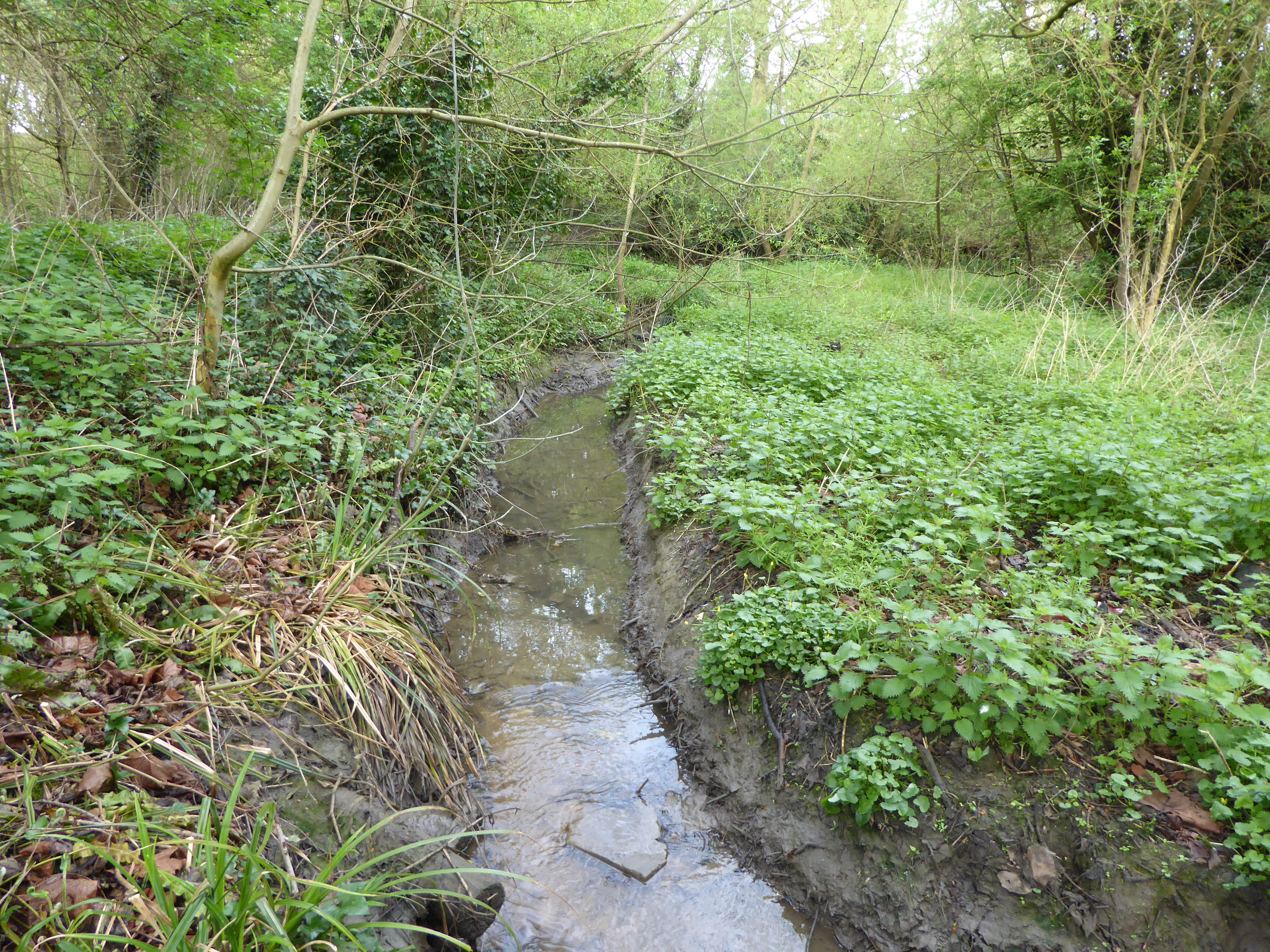
- Interactive map of Glamis Meadow and Wood
- Type: Local Nature Reserve
- Location: Wellingborough, Northamptonshire
- OS grid: SP 882 686
- Area: 9.5 hectares (23 acres)
- Manager: Borough of Wellingborough

Glamis Meadow and Wood is a 9.5 hectare Local Nature Reserve in Wellingborough in Northamptonshire. It was previously owned and managed by Borough of Wellingborough.

A stream runs through this site, which has woodland and grassland. Facilities include a cycle path, seating and information boards.

There is access from Hardwick Road and The Promenade.
