= Dagenham Village Churchyard =

Churchyard in London, England

Coordinates: 51.5387°N 0.1614°E

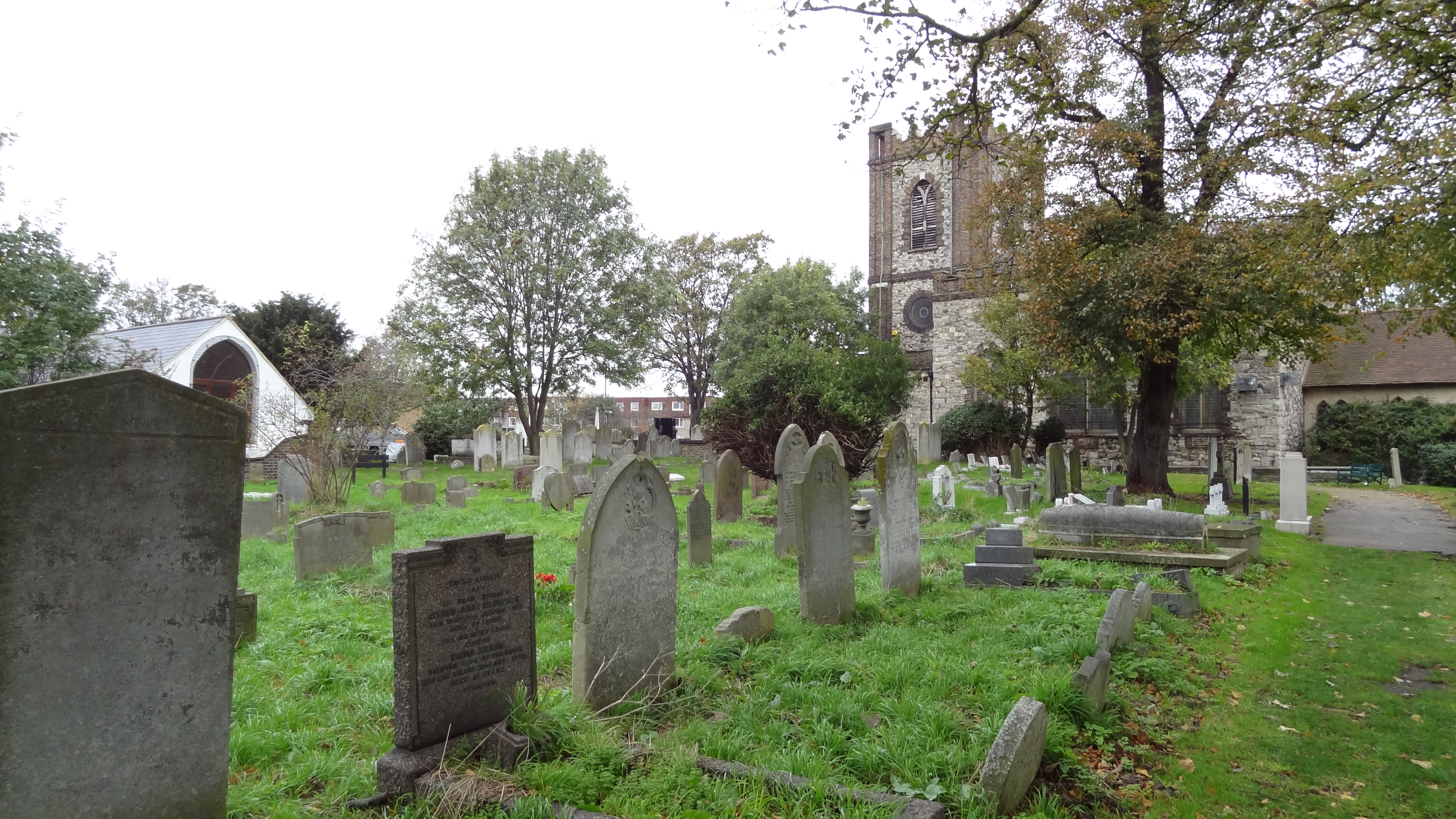

Dagenham Village Churchyard or St Peter and St Paul's Churchyard is a 0.88 hectare Local Nature Reserve in Dagenham in the London Borough of Barking and Dagenham. It is owned by the borough council.

The church dates back to the early thirteenth century, and the graveyard has probably been in use for over 800 years. The churchyard contains the Commonwealth war graves of seventeen service personnel, nine from World War I and eight from World War II.

It was closed to burials in the 1990s, and the church and the council then decided that it should be managed as a nature reserve. Its main importance for wildlife lies in its invertebrates, including butterflies and crickets, which provide food for bats. Woodpeckers feed on an avenue of lime trees, and a family of foxes live in the churchyard.

Access is from Church Lane.
