= Bath Hills =

Nature reserve in United Kingdom

Coordinates: 52.469°N 1.422°E

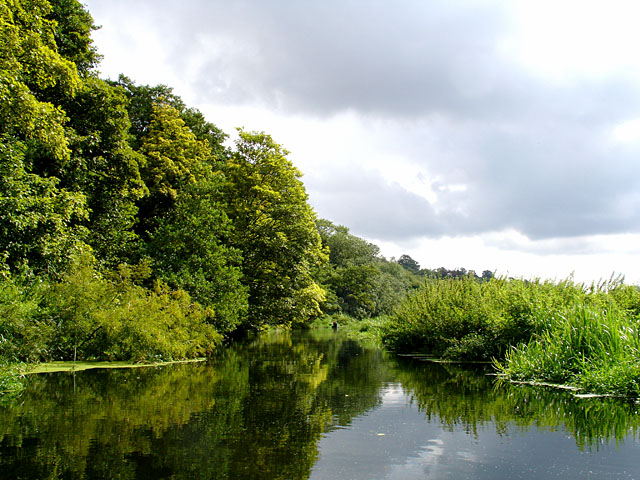
- Interactive map of Bath Hills
- Type: Local Nature Reserve
- Location: Ditchingham, Norfolk
- OS grid: TM 325 912
- Area: 12.2 hectares (30 acres)
- Manager: South Norfolk District Council

Bath Hills is a 12.2-hectare (30-acre) Local Nature Reserve west of Ditchingham in Norfolk. It is owned by South Norfolk District Council and managed by the Broads Authority.

This is the sheltered south side of a steep valley, and spring flowers bloom very early as a result.
