= Howe Grove Wood =

Nature reserve in Hertfordshire, England

Coordinates: 51.7661°N 0.4668°W

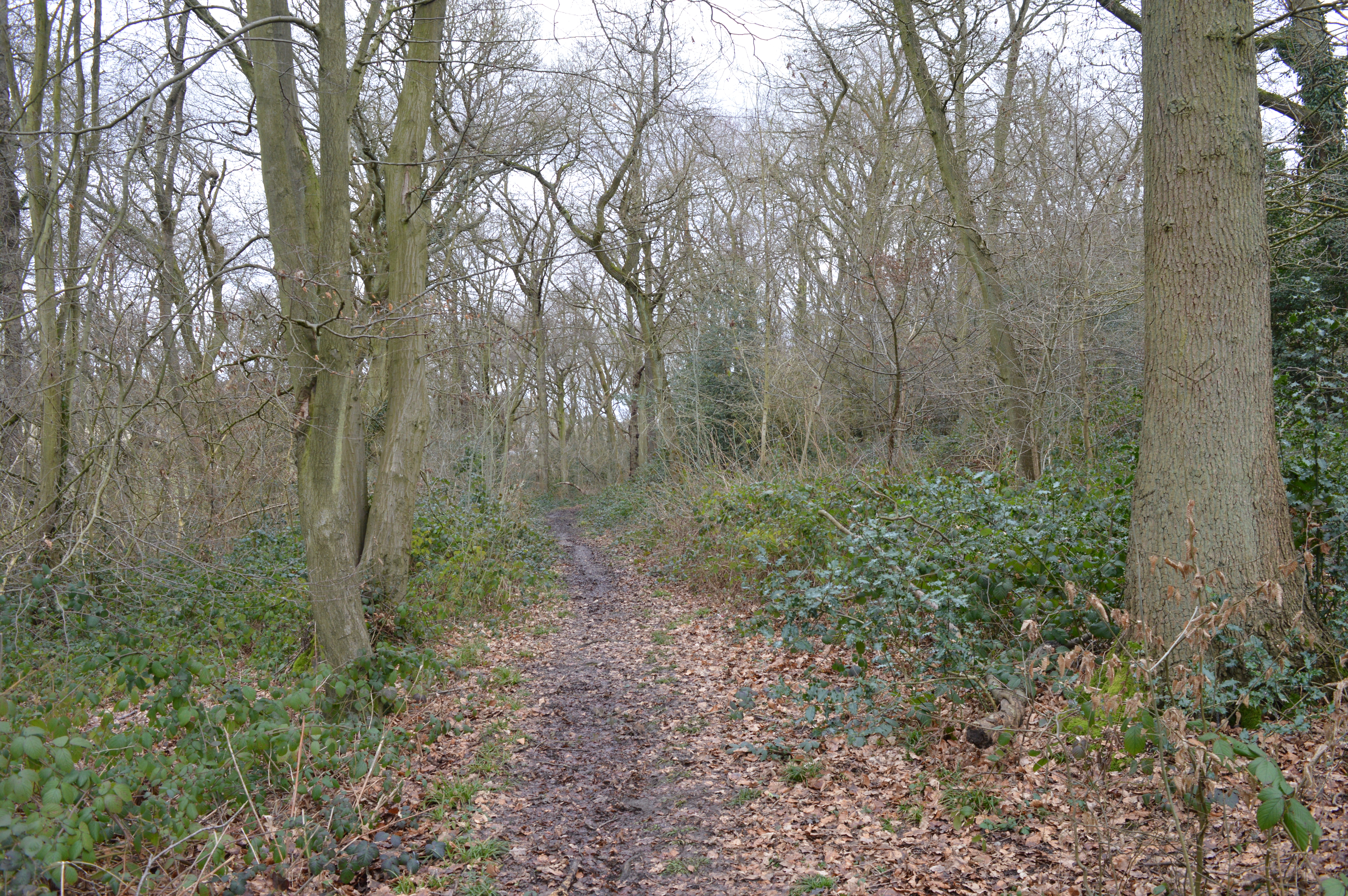

Howe Grove Wood is an 8.5 hectare Local Nature Reserve (LNR) in Hemel Hempstead in Hertfordshire. It was declared an LNR in 1997 by Dacorum Borough Council.

The site is a dense and steeply sloping wood with a network of footpaths. There is a noticeboard at the main entrance on Link Road, and there is also access from Fletcher Way opposite Thriftfield.
