= List of local nature reserves in Buckinghamshire =

Local Nature Reserves in Buckinghamshire
- Location: Buckinghamshire, England
- Area: 1,874 km^{2} (724 sq mi)
- Operator: Buckinghamshire Council and Milton Keynes City Council

Buckinghamshire is a ceremonial county in south-east England. Its county town is Aylesbury, and it is surrounded by Northamptonshire to the north, Bedfordshire and Hertfordshire to the east, Surrey and Berkshire to the south, Greater London to the south-east and Oxfordshire to the west. As of April 2020, the ceremonial county is administered by two unitary authorities, Buckinghamshire Council and Milton Keynes City Council. Buckinghamshire has an area of 1874 km^{2}, and a population of 739,600.

Local nature reserves (LNRs) are designated by local authorities under the National Parks and Access to the Countryside Act 1949. The local authority must have a legal control over the site, by owning or leasing it or having an agreement with the owner. LNRs are sites which have a special local interest either biologically or geologically, and local authorities have a duty to care for them. They can apply local bye-laws to manage and protect LNRs.

As of July 2016 there are sixteen LNRs in Buckinghamshire. (Note: Natural England lists a seventeenth Buckinghamshire LNR, Denham Quarry Park, but this appears to be an error. The River Colne forms the boundary between Buckinghamshire to the west and the London Borough of Hillingdon to the east. The Natural England map shows most of Denham Quarry Park east of the river in Hillingdon, in an area which is also designated a London LNR, Denham Country Park.) Fifteen are in the Buckinghamshire Council area, and one is in the City of Milton Keynes. Two sites are also Sites of Special Scientific Interest and four are in the Chilterns Area of Outstanding Natural Beauty. The largest is Black Park LNR with 65.8 hectares. This is part of the 250 hectare Black Park Country Park and the forty-three square mile Colne Valley regional park. The smallest site is the 0.5 hectare Coombs Quarry, which has geological interest due to a Jurassic layer, and Romano-British archaeology. There is public access to all sites except Buckingham Sand Pit.

== Key ==
=== Other classifications ===
- BBOWT = Berkshire, Buckinghamshire and Oxfordshire Wildlife Trust
- CAONB = Chilterns Area of Outstanding Natural Beauty
- CVRP = Colne Valley regional park
- NT = National Trust
- SM = Scheduled monument
- SSSI = Site of Special Scientific Interest

== Sites ==
Site	Photograph	Area (Note: The area is taken from the Natural England map of each site. (Click on the identify icon (i) in the "Feature Tools" and then click on the site.))	Location (Note: The location is taken from the Natural England details page for the site.)	Local Authority	Other classifications	Map (Note: The maps are on the Natural England database of local nature reserves.)	Details (Note: Details are on the pages on each site in the Natural England database of local nature reserves.)	Description
Bacombe Hill	Bacombe Hill	24.6 hectares (61 acres)	Upper Bacombe; 51.756°N 0.7569°W; SP859071	Buckinghamshire	BBOWT, CAONB, NT, SSSI	Map	Details	The hill is chalk grassland which has a rich variety of species. including the entire British population of fringed gentian, and there are areas of juniper and mixed scrub. Invertebrates include scarce species, such as chalkhill blue and brown argus butterflies. The site is also noted for its orchids.
Black Park	Black Park lake	65.8 hectares (163 acres)	Wexham; 51.545866°N 0.54487446°W; TQ010840	Buckinghamshire	CVRP, SSSI	Map	Details	This site has heath and alder carr, both of which are rare in the county. There is also mixed and coniferous woodland, and some areas of acid grassland. The fauna is diverse, and insects include the nationally rare Roesel's bush cricket. There are eighteen species of butterfly, birds including hobbies and nightjars, and snakes and lizards.
Blue Lagoon	Blue Lagoon	33.1 hectares (82 acres)	Milton Keynes; 51.985°N 0.7375°W; SP868326	Milton Keynes		Map	Details	The lake is 18 metres deep with clean water and diverse wildlife. Spoil heaps around the lake have been naturally colonised to become grassland, scrub and woodland. The grassland has fauna and flora typical of chalk downland.
Brush Hill	Brush Hill	14.7 hectares (36 acres)	Princes Risborough; 51.7242°N 0.8142°W; SP820035	Buckinghamshire	CAONB	Map	Details	Habitats on the site are chalk grassland, woodland and scrub. Flora include wood anemone and wood sorrel, and there are birds such as nuthatches and treecreepers. At the top of the hill there is ancient woodland with oak, Scots pine and larch. The grassland is grazed by sheep between October and March.
Buckingham Sand Pit	Buckingham Sand Pit	1.8 hectares (4.4 acres)	Buckingham; 52.003647°N 0.98314473°W; SP699344	Buckinghamshire		Map	Details	The site is important geologically as it is a rare exposure of Quaternary Ice Age layers, showing clays, sands and pebble layers from the Anglian Ice Age around 450,000 years ago, when Buckingham was under two kilometres of ice. There is also evidence for the tundra phase which followed. There is no public access to the site.
Captain's Wood	Captain's Wood	13.9 hectares (34 acres)	Chesham; 51.7213°N 0.6261°W; SP950034	Buckinghamshire	CAONB	Map	Details	The Chiltern Society took over management of this site from Buckinghamshire County Council in 2014. It is described by the Society as ancient beech woodland which has high ecological value. In spring it is carpeted with bluebells.
Chairborough Road	Chairborough Road	3.9 hectares (9.6 acres)	High Wycombe; 51.6240°N 0.7764°W; SU848924	Buckinghamshire		Map	Details	The site has diverse habitats, with chalk grassland, woodland and scrub, and it has a wide variety of plant and animal species. There are birds such as bullfinches, and mammals include muntjac deer, foxes and badgers. Slowworms and lizards bask in the summer on bare ground or on anthills.
Coombs Quarry	Coombs Quarry	0.5 hectares (1.2 acres)	Buckingham; 51.9876°N 0.9339°W; SP733326	Buckinghamshire		Map	Details	This very small site has geological, botanical and archaeological interest. It was disused for almost a century before being opened to the public in 1993. It had lime kilns in the Roman period, and was used for quarrying building stone and rock for lime burning until the end of the nineteenth century. It exposes Jurassic Blisworth Clay, probably laid down in shallow brackish water.
Gomm's Wood	Gomm's Wood	18.1 hectares (45 acres)	High Wycombe; 51.6341°N 0.70822°W; SU895936	Buckinghamshire		Map	Details	The site has areas of chalk grassland and ancient woodland. The woods have a range of birds such as bullfinches and chaffinches. The grassland has a variety of orchids, and insects include bees and butterflies.
Holtspur Bank	Holtspur Bank	6.6 hectares (16 acres)	Beaconsfield; 51.603167°N 0.67588927°W; SU918902	Buckinghamshire		Map	Details	Half of the site is chalk grassland and half ancient woodland. It has a wide variety of species including many orchids on the grassland, and oaks with some cherry trees in the woodland. The understorey has holly, elderberry, hawthorn and honeysuckle. It is one of only two sites in South Buckinghamshire where dormice have been recorded.
Northmoor Hill Wood	Northmoor Hill Wood	8.7 hectares (21 acres)	Denham; 51.5921°N 0.50875°W; TQ 034 892	Buckinghamshire		Map	Details	The western area has wet clay flora, with alder woodland, sedges, rushes, yellow archangel and star of Bethlehem orchids. Geologically, the western end is in the Reading Formation, dating to the Tertiary period. The eastern part is chalk, and an old chalk quarry exposes layers dating to the Cretaceous period.
Prestwood (Picnic Site)	Prestwood Local Nature Reserve	2.1 hectares (5.2 acres)	Prestwood; 51.6840°N 0.74875°W; SU866991	Buckinghamshire	CAONB	Map	Details	This is steeply sloping chalk grassland with a diverse range of species, including some rare ones. Birds include bullfinches, blackcaps and garden warblers, and there are butterflies such as dingy and grizzled skippers and green hairstreaks.
Sands Bank	Sands Bank	11.1 hectares (27 acres)	High Wycombe; 51.633238°N 0.79638658°W; SU834934	Buckinghamshire		Map	Details	The site is a mixture of woodland, scrub and grassland on a south facing chalk slope. Some of the beech woodland dates back 400 years, and there is younger cherry, holly, yew and ash. Ground plants include wood spurge and goldilocks buttercup, and there are mammals such as roe deer and hazel dormice. There is a wide variety of fungi.
Snakemoor	Snakemoor	1.8 hectares (4.4 acres)	Haddenham; 51.7713°N 0.94634°W; SP728086	Buckinghamshire		Map	Details	The site became a nature reserve in 1987. It has a hay meadow, woods and a pond. There are over 100 species of flowers and other plants, including snowdrops and lent lily, a small native species of daffodil.
Warren Nature Reserve	Warren Nature Reserve	2.3 hectares (5.7 acres)	Wooburn; 51.5835°N 0.68368°W; SU913880	Buckinghamshire		Map	Details	The River Wye runs along the north-west border of the site, providing a habitat for birds such as mallards, herons and kingfishers. The reserve is wooded with a variety of trees such as ash, lime and oak. Animals include badgers, voles, grass snakes, muntjac deer and bats.
Whiteleaf Hill	Whiteleaf Hill	11.0 hectares (27 acres)	Princes Risborough; 51.7278°N 0.81125°W; SP822039	Buckinghamshire	CAONB, SM	Map	Details	The southern half of the site is semi-natural beech woodland which dates back to at least 1600. Most of the mature trees were lost during storms in the late twentieth century, but they have been replaced by scrub which is regenerating into forest. Birds include whitethroats, and there are butterflies such as the speckled wood and the peacock.

== See also ==
- List of Sites of Special Scientific Interest in Buckinghamshire
- List of local nature reserves in England
- Berkshire, Buckinghamshire and Oxfordshire Wildlife Trust
