= Whiteleaf =

Whiteleaf may refer to:

- Whiteleaf, Buckinghamshire
  - Whiteleaf Cross, after which the above hamlet is named
- Whiteleaf Public School
