= Steriker Hare =

English cricketer (1900–1977)

Personal information
- Full name: Steriker Norman Hare
- Born: 31 March 1900; Tottenham, Middlesex, England
- Died: 30 September 1977 (aged 77); Meadle, Buckinghamshire, England
- Batting: Right-handed

Domestic team information
- Years: Team
- 1921: Essex

Career statistics
Competition	First-class
Matches	3
Runs scored	117
Batting average	23.40
100s/50s	–/1
Top score	98
Balls bowled	–
Wickets	–
Bowling average	–
5 wickets in innings	–
10 wickets in match	–
Best bowling	–
Catches/stumpings	1/–
- Source: Cricinfo, 27 October 2011

Steriker ('Eric') Norman Hare CBE (31 March 1900 – 30 September 1977) was an English cricketer. Hare was a right-handed batsman. The son of a manager for Barclays Bank, Hare was born at Tottenham, Middlesex and educated at Chigwell School.

Hare made his first-class debut for Essex against Derbyshire in the 1921 County Championship. He made two further first-class appearances that season, against Gloucestershire and Somerset. He scored a total of 117 runs in these three matches at an average of 23.40, with a high score of 98. This score came in the match against Derbyshire, during which he shared in a stand of 251 for the 9th wicket with Johnny Douglas. This remains the record partnership for Essex for the 9th wicket.

Having spent his career working for Royal Dutch Shell in Baghdad, he died at Meadle, Buckinghamshire on 30 September 1977. His younger brother, Clifford Theodore Rippon Hare, was the father of the playwright Sir David Hare.
