= Whiteleaf, Buckinghamshire =

Hamlet in Buckinghamshire, England

Coordinates: 51.731929°N 0.814836°W

Whiteleaf
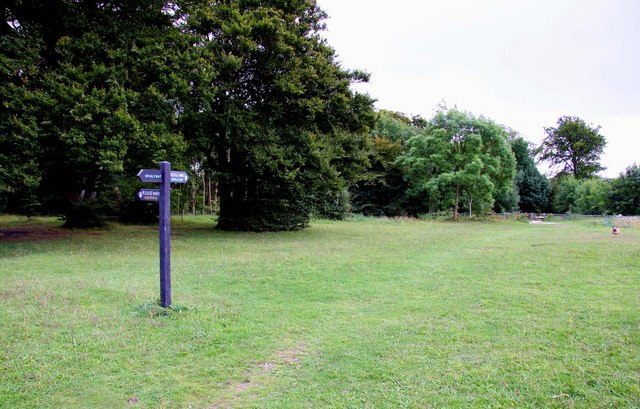
- The Ridgeway on Whiteleaf Hill, 2009

- Location within Buckinghamshire
- OS grid reference: SP8104
- Civil parish: Princes Risborough
- Unitary authority: Buckinghamshire
- Ceremonial county: Buckinghamshire
- Region: South East
- Country: England
- Sovereign state: United Kingdom
- Post town: PRINCES RISBOROUGH
- Postcode district: HP27
- Dialling code: 01844
- Police: Thames Valley
- Fire: Buckinghamshire
- Ambulance: South Central
- UK Parliament: Aylesbury

Whiteleaf is a hamlet in the civil parish of Princes Risborough and the ecclesiastical parish of Monks Risborough in Buckinghamshire, England. It is located 7 miles south of the county town of Aylesbury and 8 miles north of High Wycombe. It lies halfway up the northern scarp of the Chilterns, about half a mile from the parish church of Monks Risborough.

The hamlet's name is first found in the form White Cliff in the eighteenth century, referring to the white chalk cliff above the road to the east of the hamlet, which has the Whiteleaf Cross cut into the chalk on the side of Whiteleaf Hill above it, making an important landmark for miles around. In addition to the cross, there is a Neolithic barrow on Whiteleaf Hill.

Whiteleaf is home to Monks Risborough Cricket Club and the 9-hole Whiteleaf Golf Club, both of which lie slightly south-east of the main road through the village, which follows the path of the Upper Icknield Way. The cricket ground has a significant slope and was tried by the BBC to see if it would be suitable for filming the cricket scene in the production of A. G. Macdonnell's England, Their England. However, it was not found to be sloping enough. The cricket club celebrated its centenary in 1993 and a book covering its history was published. The cricket club pavilion was largely destroyed by fire in 2010.

The village also has a public house, the Red Lion.

Children's writer Kevin Crossley-Holland grew up in Crosskeys, Westfields (a cottage now called Woodside). His father was the composer Peter Crossley-Holland.
