= Owlswick =

Hamlet in Buckinghamshire, England

Coordinates: 51.74895°N 0.85850°W

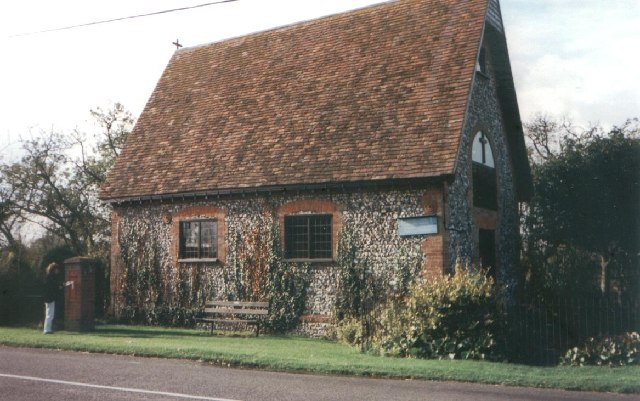
St Peters Chapel.

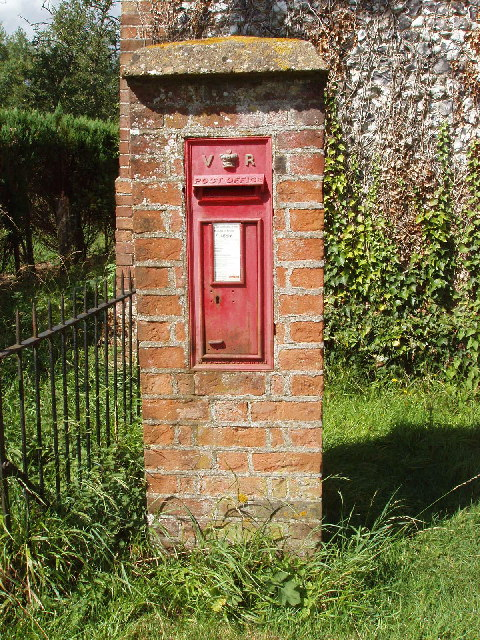
Victorian Pillar box in Owlswick.

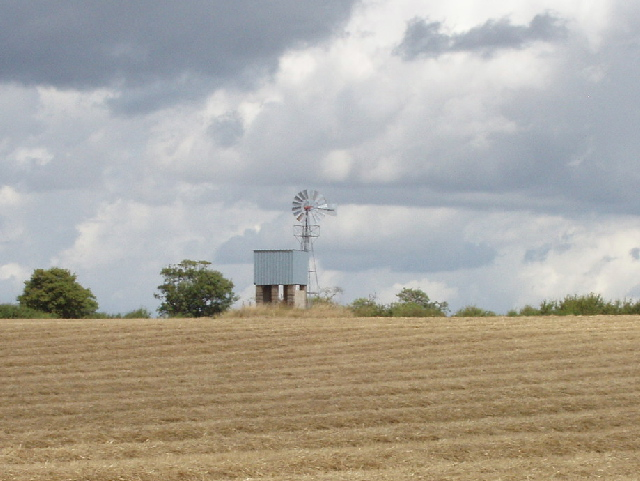
Working windpump near Owlswick.

Owlswick is a hamlet in Buckinghamshire, England, about 3 miles East of Thame and 4 miles SSE of Aylesbury. It is part of the civil parish of Longwick-cum-Ilmer and is in the ecclesiastical parish of Monks Risborough.

The name appears in a document of about 1200 as Ulveswike, meaning the dairy farm of Ulf, which was a Danish personal name. The district is well to the south of the Danelaw, but a man of Danish origin may have come south and settled here.

The hamlet was not mentioned in Domesday Book in 1086 because it formed part of the manor of Monks Risborough. It was later subinfeudated (i.e. granted as a feudal sub-manor) to a military subtenant and was held by knight-service by the 13th century. It continued as a separate sub-manor, paying a quit-rent to the manor of Monks Risborough until copyhold tenure was abolished in 1925.
