= Whiteleaf Cross =

Chalk hill carving in Buckinghamshire, England

Coordinates: 51°43′43″N 0°48′42″W

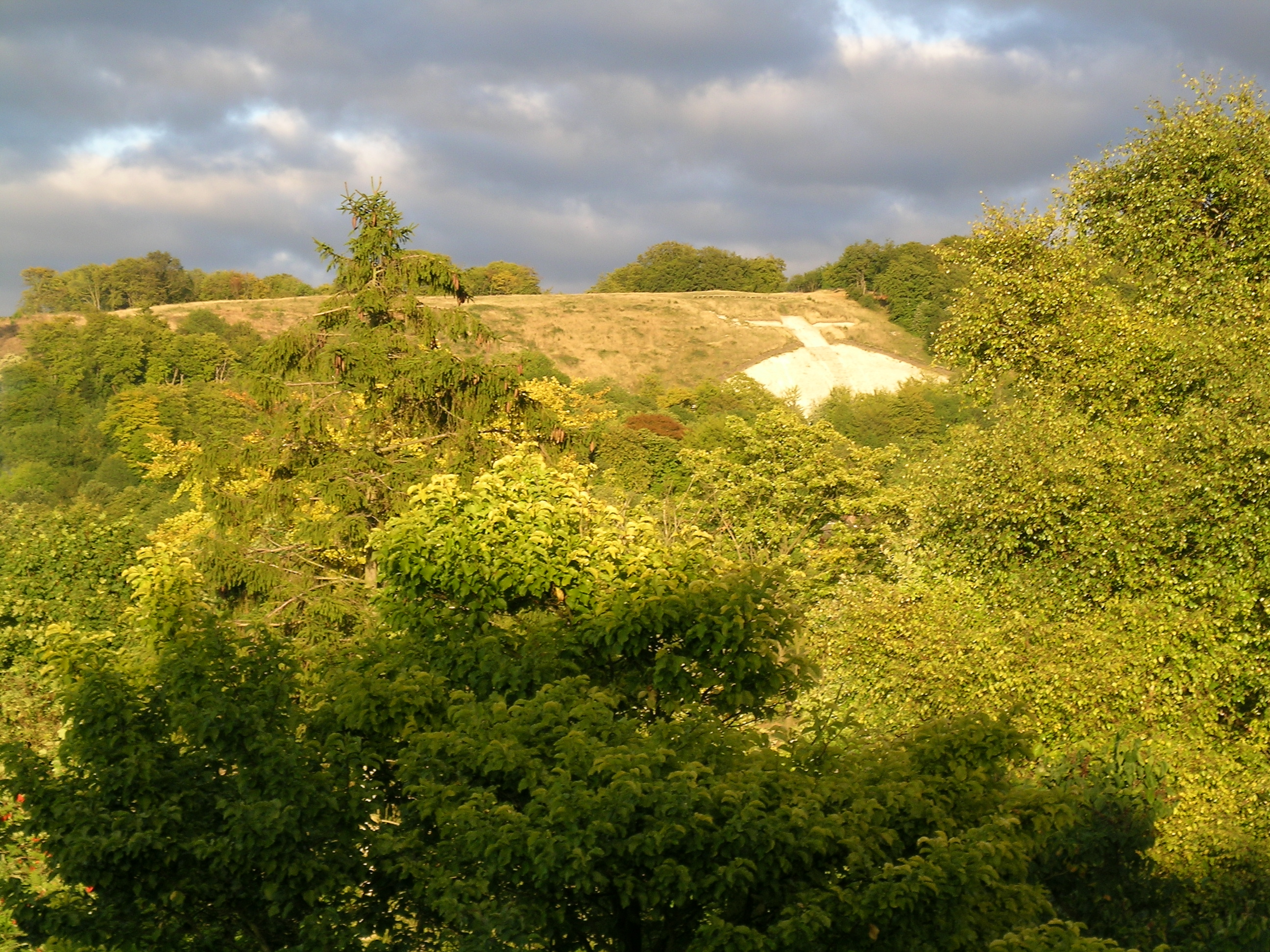
Whiteleaf Cross from below

Whiteleaf Cross is a cross-shaped chalk hill carving, with a triangular base, on Whiteleaf Hill in Whiteleaf near Princes Risborough in Buckinghamshire.

It sits above the road to the east of the hamlet, whose name is first found in the form White Cliff in the eighteenth century, referring to the white chalk cliff. The cliff is probably a natural formation, older than the cross.

The date and origin of the cross are unknown. It was mentioned as an antiquity by Francis Wise in 1742, but no earlier reference has been found. The cross is not mentioned in any description of the area before 1700.

The Act for enclosing the common lands in the Parish, completed on 23 September 1839, specifically required that: in order to preserve within the parish of Monks Risborough the ancient memorial or landmark there called White Cliffe Cross and the Commissioners were to allot to the Lord of the Manor the cross itself and so much of the land immediately surrounding it as shall in the judgment of the Commissioners be necessary and sufficient for rendering the same conspicuous and that it should not be planted or enclosed and should for ever thereafter remain open. The Lord of the Manor was to be responsible to renew and repair it. In the event the Commissioners allotted 7 acres (28,000 m^{2}) of land for this purpose.

Various books published in and since the 18th century have speculated on the origin of the cross, but without any supporting evidence. Theories included a Saxon celebration of a victory over the Danes, a phallic symbol later Christianised, a direction sign for a (non-existent) medieval monastery, soldiers in the Civil War amusing themselves when they had nothing better to do, and a seventeenth-century alternative to a village cross.

It was depicted in paintings by Paul Nash. One, from 1922, is in the collection of the British Council, another, from 1931, is in the Whitworth Art Gallery in Manchester.

In addition to the cross, there is a Neolithic barrow on Whiteleaf Hill, which is near the top of the cross but very unlikely to have any connection with it.

The cross is protected by the county as part of the 11-hectare (27 acre) Whiteleaf Hill Nature Reserve.
