= Meadle =

Hamlet in Buckinghamshire, England, United Kingdom

Coordinates: 51.74693°N 0.83538°W

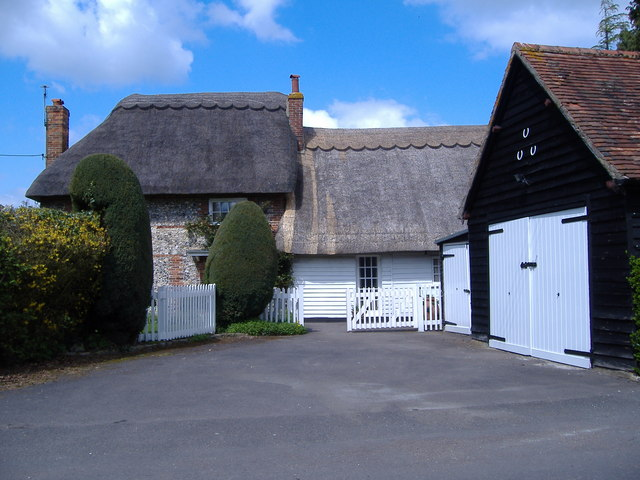
Thatched cottage in Meadle

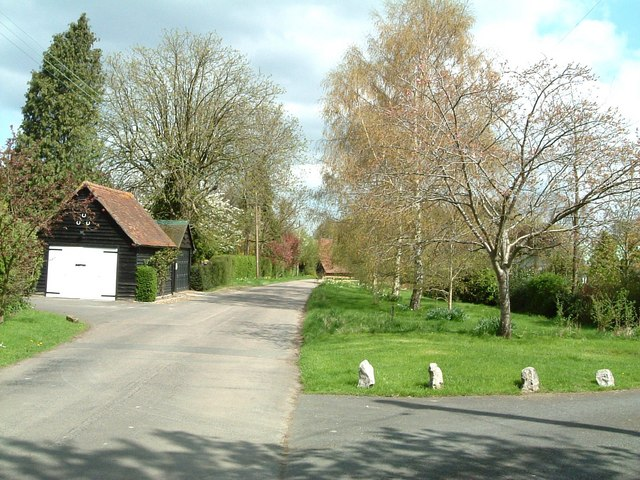
Meadle on a Spring day

Meadle is a hamlet in the civil parish of Longwick-cum-Ilmer, in Buckinghamshire, England. It is located to the north of the village of Monks Risborough and near Little Kimble. The current population of Meadle is about 75. Most of the buildings are very old: farmhouses and labourers' cottages built in traditional red clay brick with thatched roofs. A small stream rises in the village and ultimately joins the Thames.

The earliest recorded mentions of Meadle are in the English Civil War when it was caught up in the battle lines between the Royalists in Oxford and the Parliamentarians in London. A local farm, Armour Farm, is believed to have acquired its name as a store of armaments during the war.

Meadle later became a Quaker settlement; the largest farm in the hamlet is still known as Quaker Farm, where Quakers met and were buried in the orchard behind the house. A local field bears the name of Fox's Midsummer after George Fox, the founder of the Quaker movement, who held secret night-time meetings there.

In the 19th and early 20th centuries, Meadle was a centre of production for the Aylesbury Duck industry, and had a grist mill to provide feed.

Meadle was the home of John Nash, one of England's foremost painters and war artists of the inter-war years. He moved there in 1922 and started his great period of landscape water colours, wood engraving and botanical paintings, drawing on the natural scenes and rural activities of the surrounding countryside: the Vale of Aylesbury and the Chiltern Hills. He moved on during the Second World War to settle in East Anglia. The house in which he lived, Lane End, still exists.

Meadle is mostly known to visitors for the Kimble Point-to-Point, a traditional horse-racing event held on nearby fields each Easter Saturday.
