= Sands Bank =

Local nature reserve in Buckinghamshire, England

Coordinates: 51.721728°N 0.625377°W

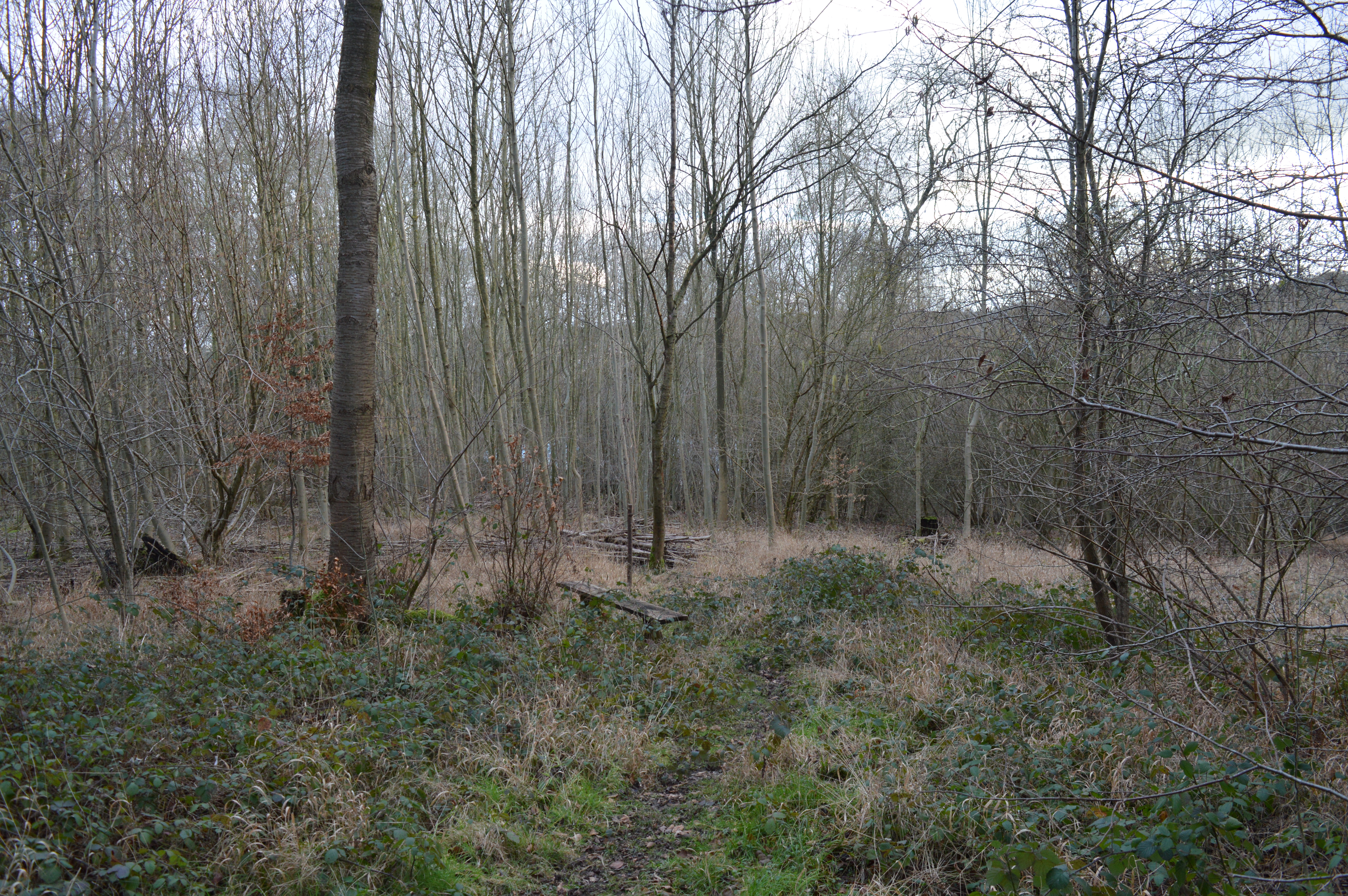

Sands Bank is an 11.1 hectares (27 acres) Local Nature Reserve in High Wycombe in Buckinghamshire. It is owned by West Wycombe Estates and managed by Wycombe District Council.

The site is a mixture of woodland, scrub and grassland on a south facing chalk slope. Some of the beech woodland dates back 400 years, and there is younger cherry, holly, yew and ash. Ground plants include wood spurge and goldilocks buttercup, and there are mammals such as roe deer and hazel dormice. There is a wide variety of fungi.

There is access from Heathfield Road.
