= Gomm's Wood =

Local nature reserve in Buckinghamshire, England

Coordinates: 51.6341°N 0.70822°W

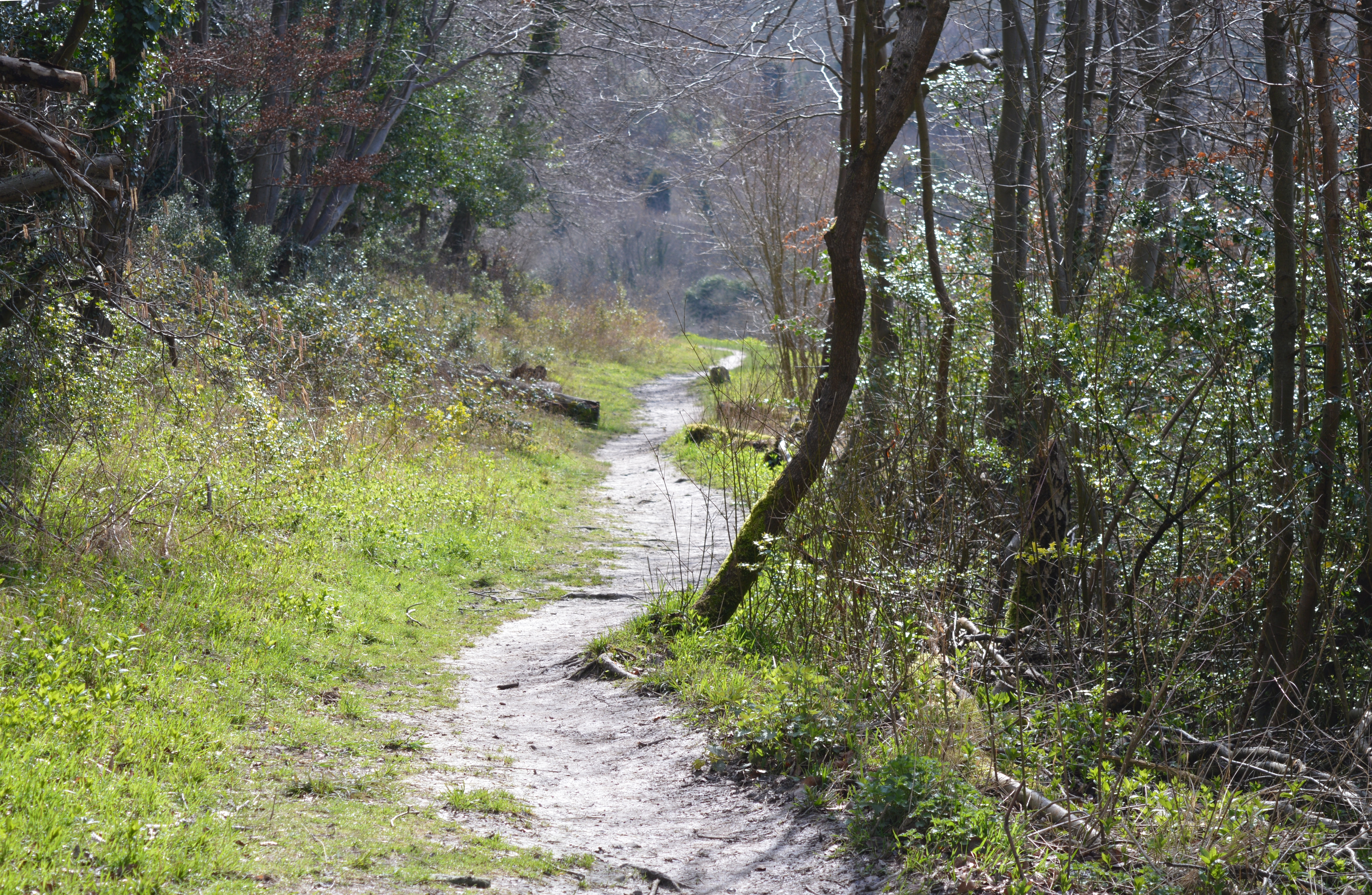

Gomm's Wood is an 18.1 hectares (45 acres) Local Nature Reserve in High Wycombe in Buckinghamshire. It is owned and managed by Wycombe District Council.

The site has areas of chalk grassland, ancient and young woodland and scrub. The woods are coppiced to maintain their varied structure, and they have a range of bird species such as bullfinches and woodpeckers. The grassland has at least eight species of orchid, and butterflies include the silver-washed fritillary.

Access points include Forest Way, Herbert Road and Cock Lane.
