= Buckingham Sand Pit =

Local nature reserve in Buckinghamshire, England

Coordinates: 52.003647°N 0.983145°W

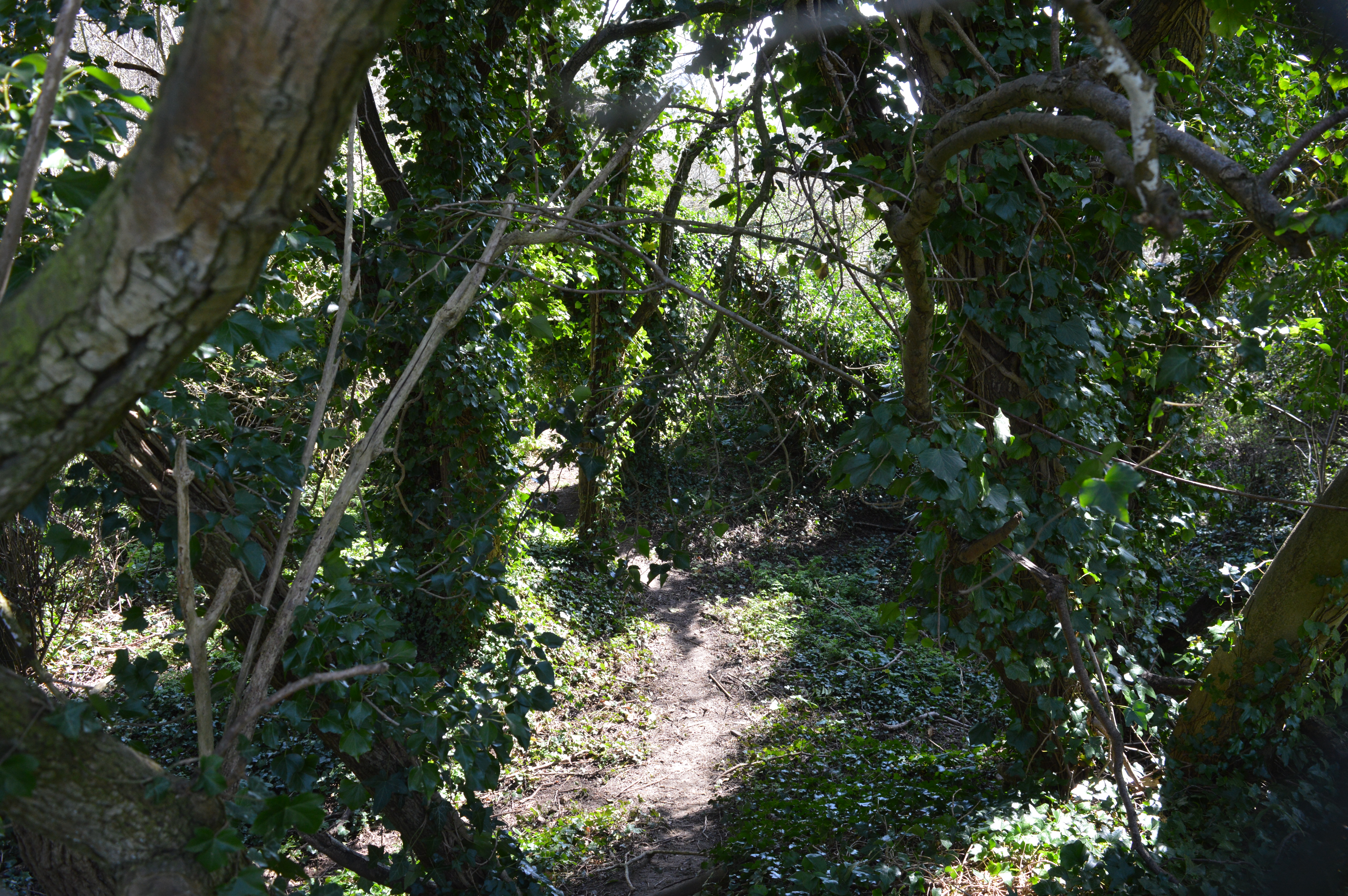

Buckingham Sand Pit is a 1.8 hectares (4.4 acres) Local Nature Reserve in Buckingham. It is owned and managed by Aylesbury Vale District Council.

The site is important geologically as it is a rare exposure of Quaternary Ice Age layers, showing clays, sands and pebble layers from the Anglian Ice Age around 450,000 years ago, when Buckingham was under two kilometres of ice. There is also evidence for the tundra phase which followed.

The site is kept locked and there is no public access.
