= Snakemoor =

Local nature reserve in Buckinghamshire, England

Coordinates: 51.7713°N 0.94634°W

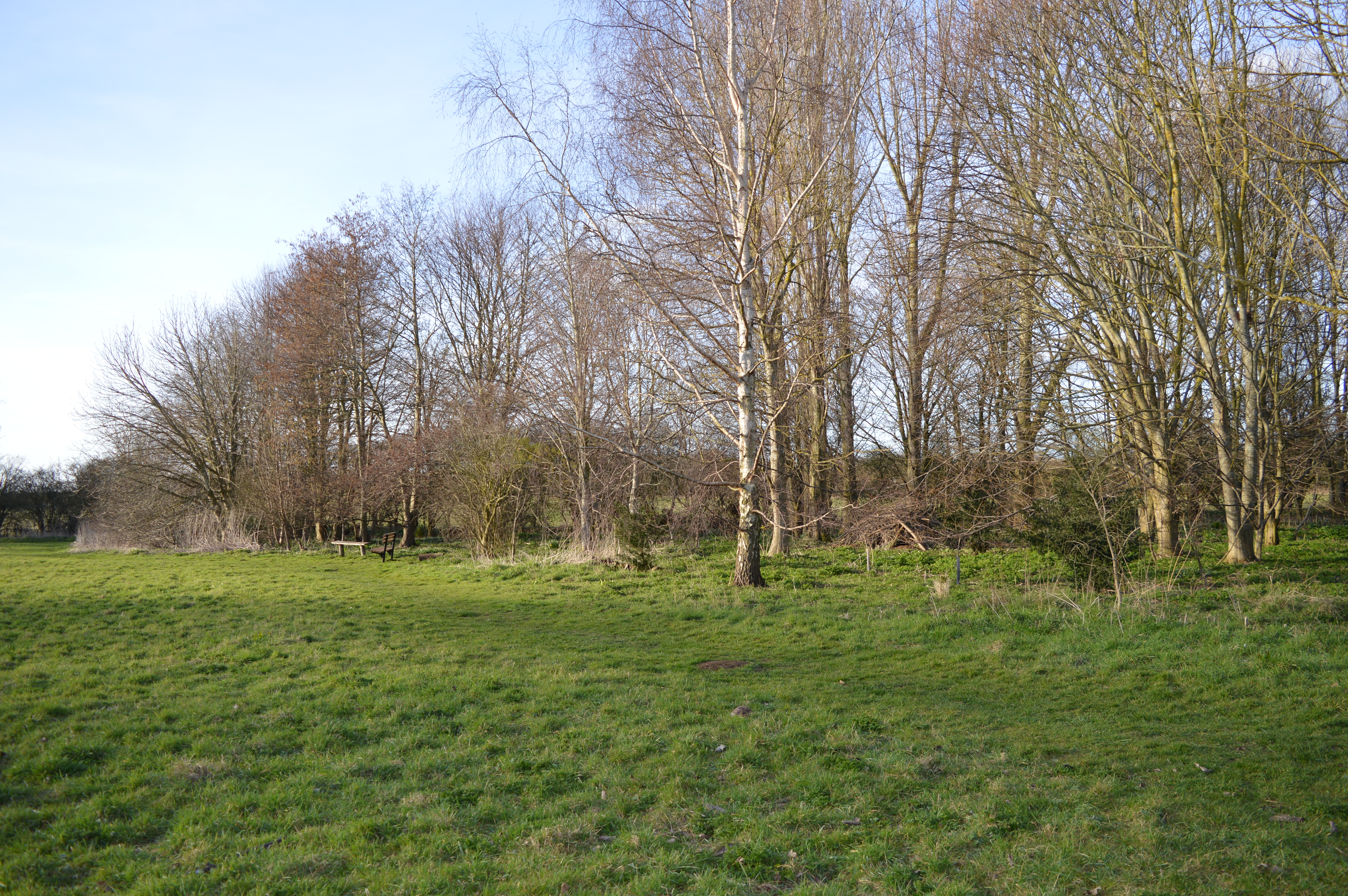

Snakemoor is a 1.8 hectares (4.4 acres) Local Nature Reserve in Haddenham in Buckinghamshire. It is owned and managed by Haddenham Parish Council.

The site became a nature reserve in 1987. It has a hay meadow, woods and a pond. There are over 100 species of flowers and other plants, including snowdrops and lent lily, a small native species of daffodil.

There is access by a footpath from Thame Road, next to Haddenham and Thame Parkway railway station.
