= Captain's Wood, Buckinghamshire =

Local nature reserve in Buckinghamshire, England

Coordinates: 51.721728°N 0.625377°W

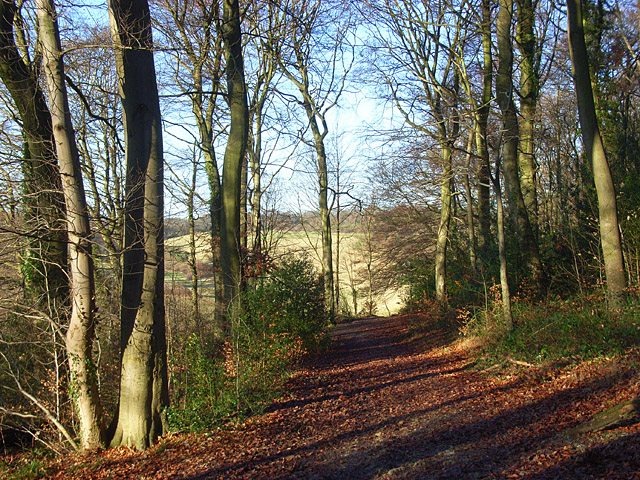

Captain's Wood is a 13.9 hectares (34 acres) Local Nature Reserve near Chesham in Buckinghamshire. It is owned by Buckinghamshire County Council and the Chiltern Society took over management of the site from the Council in 2014. It is part of the Chilterns Area of Outstanding Natural Beauty.

The site is ancient beech woodland which has high ecological value. In spring it is carpeted with bluebells.

There is access from Mount Nugent.
