= Chairborough Road =

Local nature reserve in Buckinghamshire, England

Coordinates: 51.624°N 0.7764°W

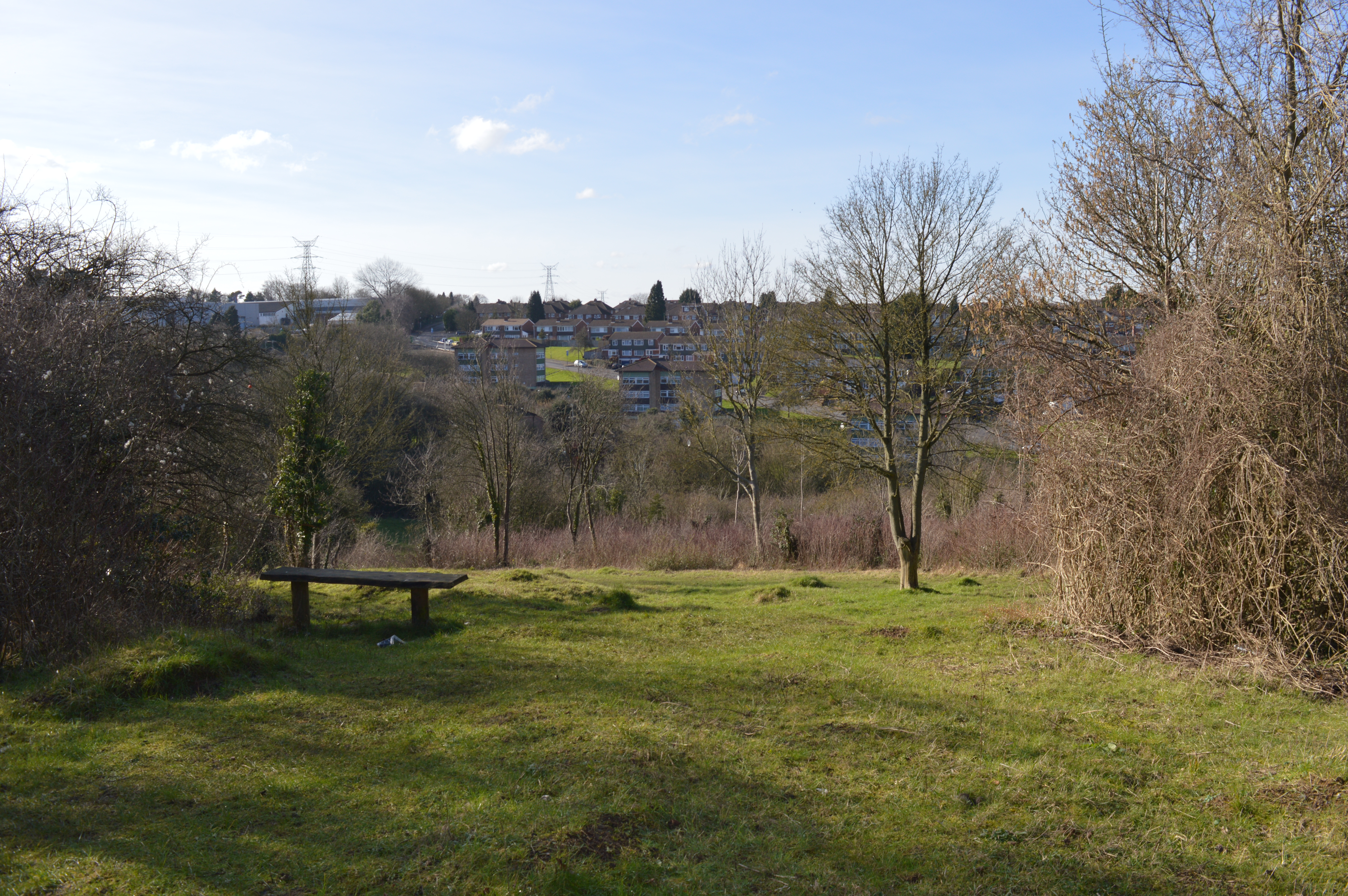

Chairborough Road is a 3.9 hectares (9.6 acres) Local Nature Reserve in High Wycombe in Buckinghamshire. It is owned and managed by Wycombe District Council.

The site has diverse habitats, with chalk grassland, woodland and scrub, and it has a wide variety of plant and animal species. There are birds such as bullfinches, and mammals include muntjac deer, foxes and badgers. Slowworms and lizards bask in the summer on bare ground or on ant hills.

There is access from Carrington Road and Chairborough Road.
