= Longwick =

Village in Buckinghamshire, England

Coordinates: 51.736°N 0.857°W

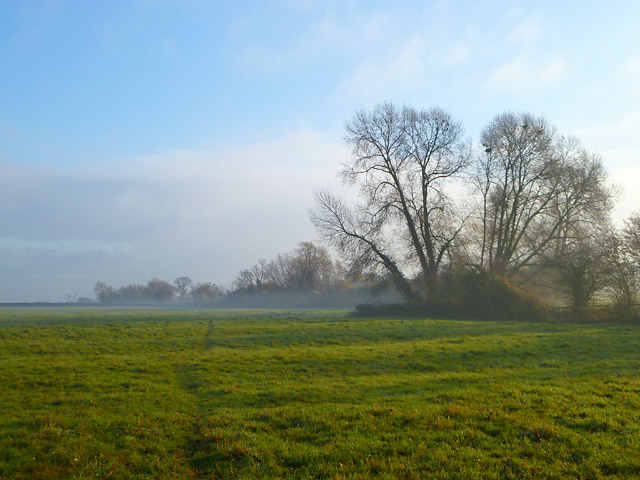
- Pasture, Longwick, 2010

- Location within Buckinghamshire
- Population: 1,267; 1,347 (2011 Census. parish)
- OS grid reference: SP7805
- Civil parish: Longwick-cum-Ilmer
- Unitary authority: Buckinghamshire
- Ceremonial county: Buckinghamshire
- Region: South East
- Country: England
- Sovereign state: United Kingdom
- Post town: Princes Risborough
- Postcode district: HP27
- Dialling code: 01844
- Police: Thames Valley
- Fire: Buckinghamshire
- Ambulance: South Central
- UK Parliament: Mid Buckinghamshire

Longwick is a village 1 1/4 miles (2 km) northwest of Princes Risborough, Buckinghamshire, England, on the A4129 road.

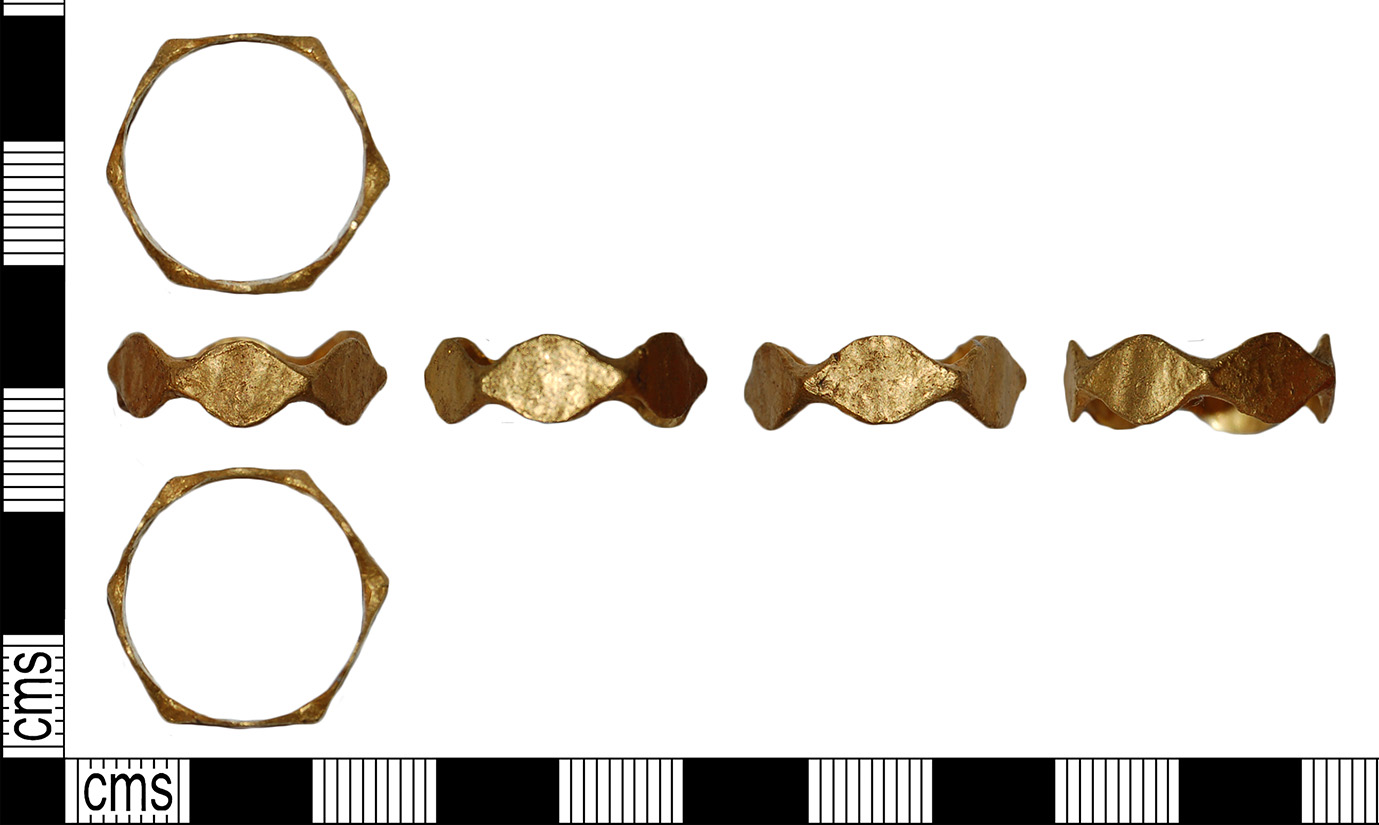
A Roman gold finger ring, dated to c. 200 – c. 300 CE and found in Longwick-cum-Ilmer in 2019

The toponym is from the Old English for "long farm".

With Ilmer, Owlswick, Meadle and Horsenden, it forms the civil parish of Longwick-cum-Ilmer which was created in 1934. In 1951 its population was 786, since when it has increased significantly to 1,267 in 2001.

Longwick was the location for the Sunrise/Back to the Future Acid House party on 12 August 1989.

== Transport ==
Longwick is served on a daily basis by the Risborough Area Community Bus (RCB) with intermittent services to Princes Risborough, five times a day. Longwick is also served by Redline Buses' 320 rail link service between Princes Risborough and Chinnor at peak times.
