= Holtspur Bank =

Local nature reserve in Buckinghamshire, England

Coordinates: 51.603167°N 0.675889°W

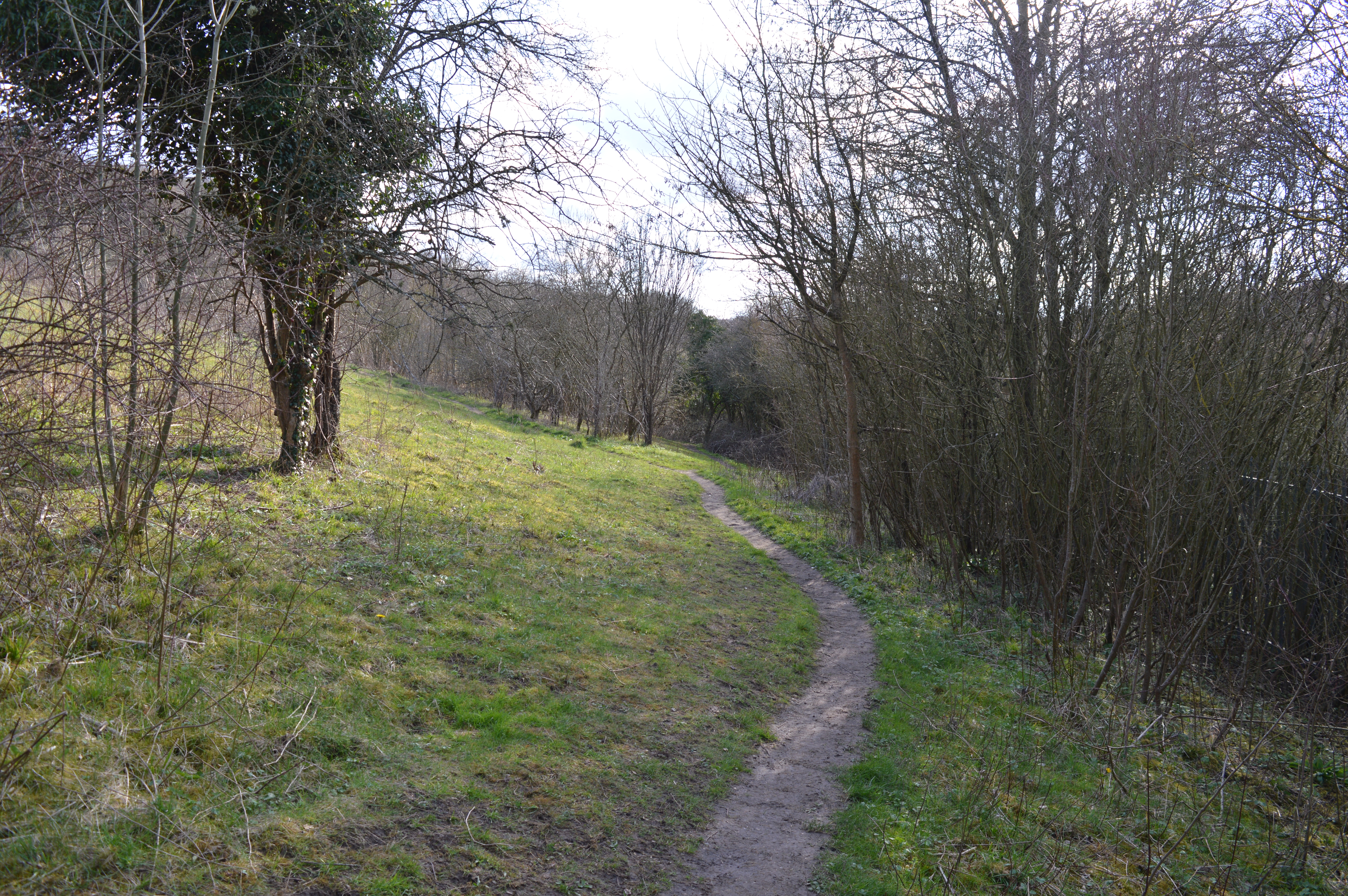

Holtspur Bank is a 6.6 hectares (16 acres) Local Nature Reserve in Beaconsfield in Buckinghamshire. It is owned and managed by Beaconsfield Town Council.

Half of the site is chalk grassland and half ancient woodland. It has a wide variety of species including many orchids on the grassland, and oaks with some cherry trees in the woodland. The understorey has holly, elderberry, hawthorn and honeysuckle. It is one of only two sites in South Buckinghamshire where dormice have been recorded.

There is access from Riding Lane and Holtspur Top Lane.

== See also ==
- Species List of flora and fauna in Holtspur Bank Local Nature Reserve
- Holtspur Bottom Butterfly Reserve, opposite the Holtspur Bank Local Nature Reserve on Butterfly Conservation Upper Thames Branch
