= Coombs Quarry =

Nature reserve in Buckinghamshire, England

Coordinates: 51.9876°N 0.9339°W

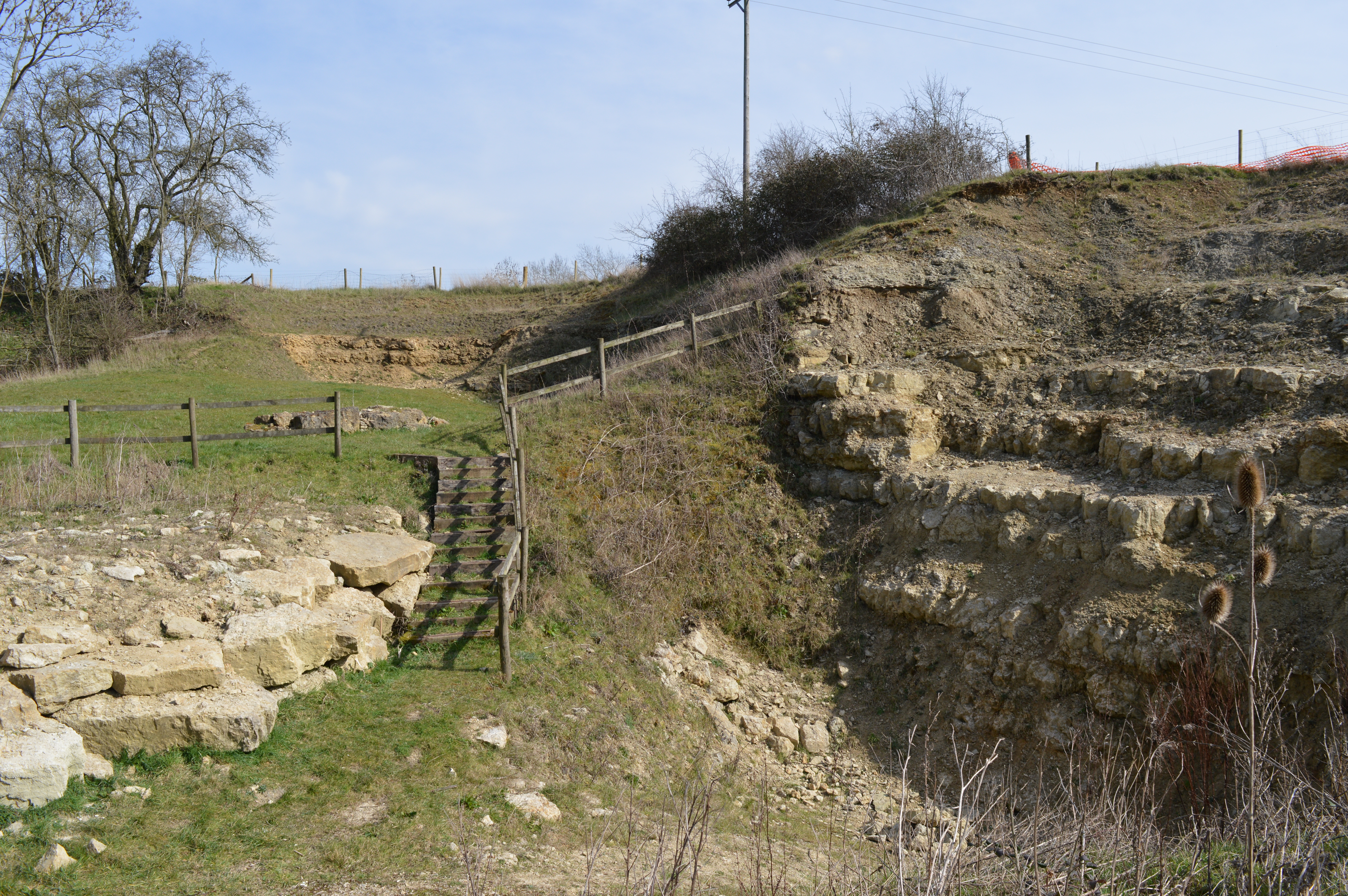

Coombs Quarry is a 0.5 hectare Local Nature Reserve east of Buckingham. It is owned and managed by Buckinghamshire County Council.

This very small site has geological, botanical and archaeological interest. It was disused for almost a century before being opened to the public in 1993. It had lime kilns in the Roman period, and was used for quarrying building stone and rock for lime burning until the end of the nineteenth century. It exposes Jurassic Blisworth Clay, probably laid down in shallow brackish water.

There is access by a footpath from the Thornborough Bridge car park on the A421 road.
