= Brush Hill Local Nature Reserve =

Local nature reserve in Buckinghamshire, England

Coordinates: 51.724677°N 0.813506°W

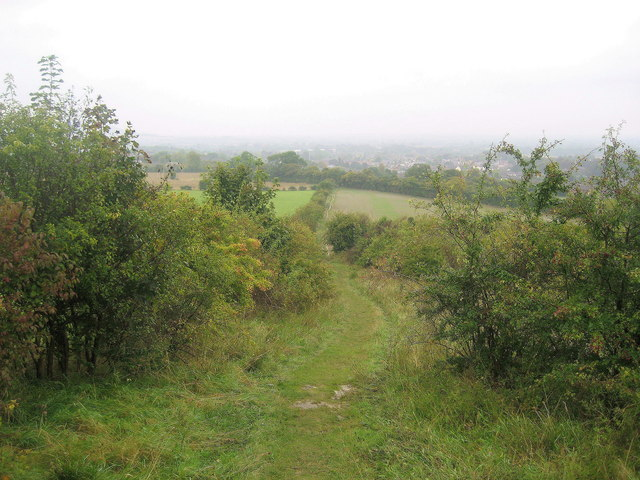

Brush Hill is a 14.7 hectares (36 acres) Local Nature Reserve east of Princes Risborough in Buckinghamshire. It has been managed since 2013 by the Chiltern Society, and it is part of the Chilterns Area of Outstanding Natural Beauty.

Habitats on the site are chalk grassland, woodland and scrub. Flora include wood anemone and wood sorrel, and there are birds such as nuthatches and treecreepers. At the top of the hill there is ancient woodland with oak, Scots pine and larch. The grassland is grazed by sheep between October and March.

There is access from Peters Lane, which divides Brush Hill from Whiteleaf Hill Local Nature Reserve.
