= Northmoor Hill Wood =

Local nature reserve in Buckinghamshire, England

Coordinates: 51.5921°N 0.50875°W

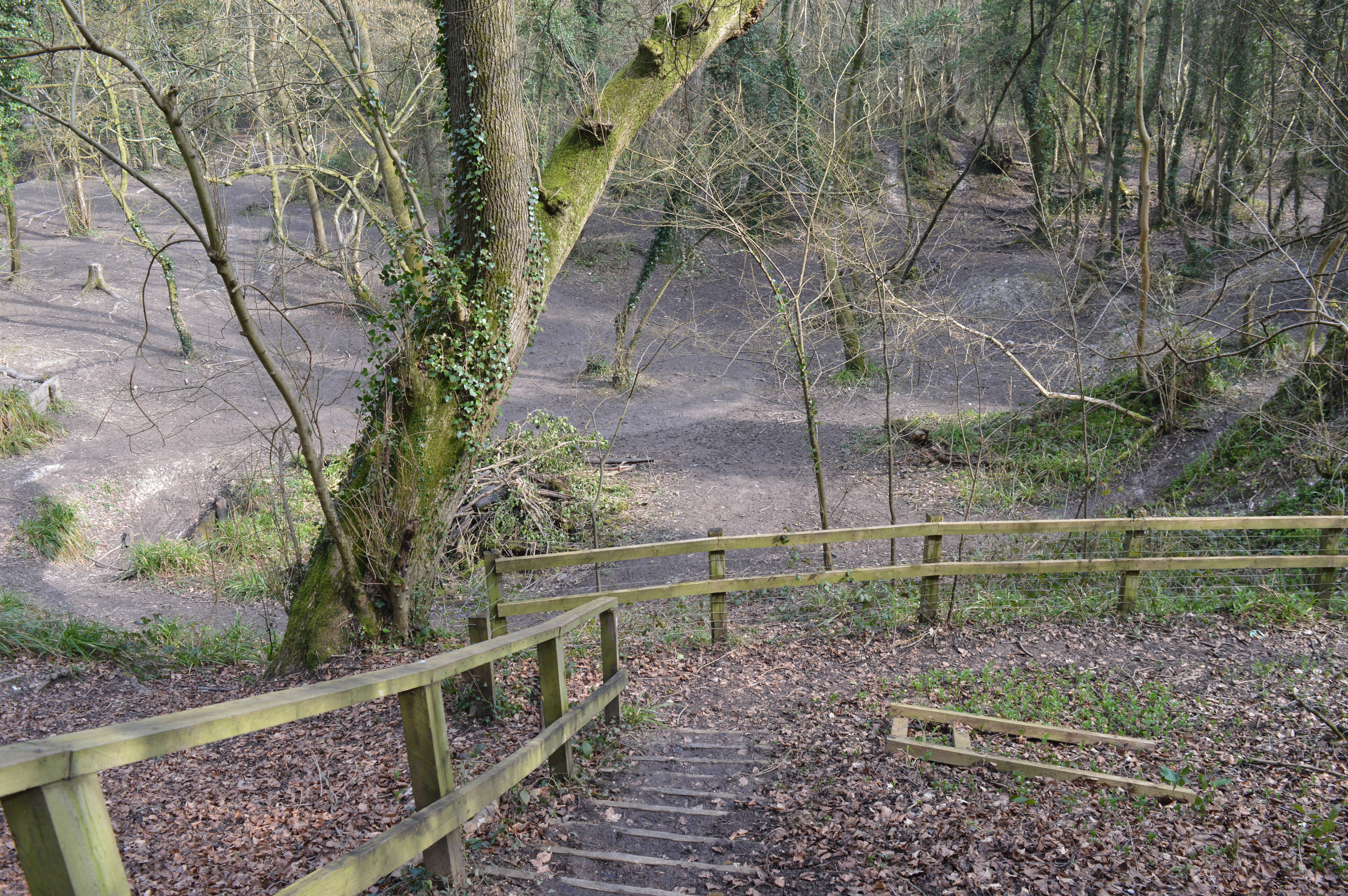
View of chalk quarry

Northmoor Hill Wood is an 8.7 hectares (21 acres) Local Nature Reserve in Denham in Buckinghamshire. It is also of geological interest.

The western area near the entrance has wet clay flora, with alder woodland, sedges, rushes, yellow archangel and star of Bethlehem orchids. Geologically, this is Reading Formation, dating to the Tertiary period. The eastern part is chalk, and an old chalk quarry exposes layers dating to the Cretaceous period.

There is access from Tilehouse Lane opposite Denham Aerodrome, and the site has a car park.
