= Whiteleaf Hill =

Local nature reserve in Buckinghamshire, England

Coordinates: 51.728244°N 0.810517°W

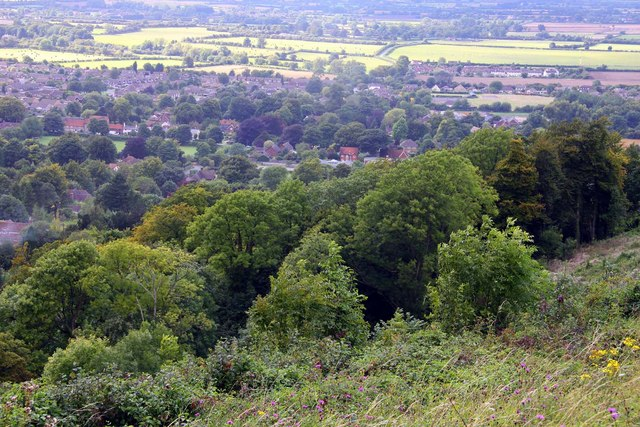

Whiteleaf Hill is an 11 hectares (27 acres) Local Nature Reserve near Princes Risborough in Buckinghamshire. It is owned by Buckinghamshire County Council and managed by the Chiltern Society. it is in the Chilterns Area of Outstanding Natural Beauty, and it has five scheduled ancient monuments, including some dating to the Neolithic and Bronze Ages, and the Whiteleaf Cross, a chalk carving thought to date to the eighteenth century.

The southern half of the site is semi-natural beech woodland which dates back to at least 1600. Most of the mature trees were lost during storms in the late twentieth century, but they have been replaced by scrub which is regenerating into forest. Birds include whitethroats, and there are butterflies such as the speckled wood and the peacock.

The Ridgeway National Trail goes through the site, and there is access from Peters Lane, which separates it from Brush Hill Local Nature Reserve.
