= List of local nature reserves in Norfolk =

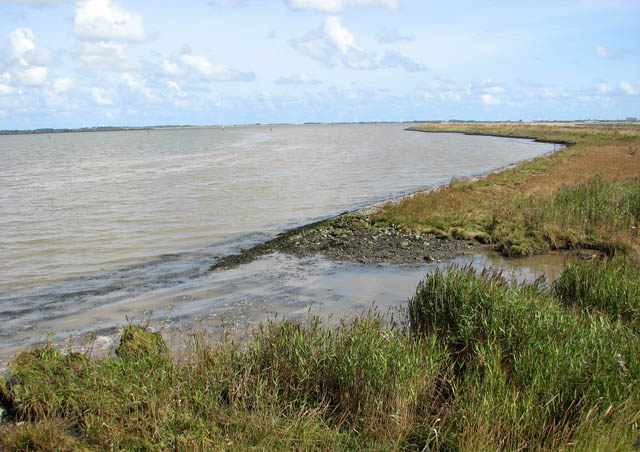
Breydon Water is a wide tidal estuary which is of national importance for wintering wildfowl

Norfolk is a county in East Anglia. It has an area of 2,074 square miles (5,370 square kilometres) and a population as of mid-2017 of 898,400. The top level of local government is Norfolk County Council with seven second tier councils: Breckland District Council, Broadland District Council, Great Yarmouth Borough Council, King's Lynn and West Norfolk Borough Council, North Norfolk District Council, Norwich City Council and South Norfolk District Council. The county is bounded by Cambridgeshire, Suffolk, Lincolnshire and the North Sea.

Local nature reserves (LNRs) are designated by local authorities under the National Parks and Access to the Countryside Act 1949. The local authority must have a legal control over the site, by owning or leasing it or having an agreement with the owner. Local nature reserves are sites which have a special local interest either biologically or geologically. Local authorities have a duty to care for them, and can apply local bye-laws to manage and protect them.

As of October 2018, there are 27 LNRs in Norfolk, seven of which are Sites of Special Scientific Interest, three are Special Areas of Conservation, three are Special Protection Areas, one is a Ramsar site, one is a Geological Conservation Review site, one is a Nature Conservation Review site, one is a Scheduled Monument, two are managed by the Norfolk Wildlife Trust and one by the Suffolk Wildlife Trust.

== Key ==
=== Other classifications ===
- GCR = Geological Conservation Review
- NCR = Nature Conservation Review site
- NWT = Norfolk Wildlife Trust
- Ramsar = Ramsar site, an internationally important wetland site
- SAC = Special Area of Conservation
- SM = Scheduled monument
- SPA = Special Protection Area under the European Union Directive on the Conservation of Wild Birds
- SSSI = Site of Special Scientific Interest
- SWT = Suffolk Wildlife Trust

== Sites ==
Site	Photograph	Area (Note: The area is taken from the Natural England map of each site. (Click on the identify icon (i) in the "Feature Tools" and then click on the site.))	Location (Note: The location is taken from the Natural England details page for the site.)	Borough	Other classifications	Map (Note: The maps are on the Natural England database of local nature reserves.)	Details (Note: Details are on the pages on each site in the Natural England database of local nature reserves.)	Description
Barnham Cross Common	Barnham Cross Common	69.2 hectares (171 acres)	Thetford; 52.398°N 0.740°E; TL 865 813	Breckland	SAC, SPA, SSSI	Map	Details	This grassland and heath common has diverse habitats and a rich flora, including several nationally rare plants. There are nearly 100 species of birds, including 60 which breed on the site, and a wide range of invertebrates.
Bath Hills	Bath Hills	12.2 hectares (30 acres)	Bungay; 52.469°N 1.422°E; TM 325 912	South Norfolk		Map	Details	This is the sheltered south side of a steep valley, and spring flowers bloom very early as a result.
Bowthorpe Marsh	Bowthorpe Marsh	5.9 hectares (15 acres)	Norwich; 52.630°N 1.221°E; TG 181 085	Norwich		Map	Details	This site adjacent to the River Yare has unimproved grassland, tall fen, a seasonal pond and drainage ditches, which have aquatic plants such as reed sweet-grass.
Breydon Water	Breydon Water	449.1 hectares (1,110 acres)	Great Yarmouth; 52.607°N 1.684°E; TG 495 074	Great Yarmouth	Ramsar, SPA, SSSI	Map	Details	This inland tidal estuary has large areas of mud at low tide, and it provides an ample food supply for migrating and wintering wildfowl and waders. There are nationally important numbers of several species of wintering wildfowl, including rare species.
Broome Heath	Broome Heath	31.7 hectares (78 acres)	Bungay; 52.470°N 1.453°E; TM 346 914	South Norfolk	SM, SSSI	Map	Details	This site in the valley of the River Waveney has marshy grazing land and lakes. At the southern end there is a Neolithic settlement, and in the middle there are long and round barrows.
Brundall Church Fen	Brundall Church Fen	2.8 hectares (6.9 acres)	Norwich; 52.621°N 1.426°E; TG 320 081	Broadland		Map	Details	Fauna in this former gazing marsh include water voles, foxes, Chinese water deer and occasionally otters.
Danby Wood	Danby Wood	3.9 hectares (9.6 acres)	Norwich; 52.603°N 1.275°E; TG 219 056	Norwich		Map	Details	This semi-natural wood on a former chalk mine has many hills, hollows and banks. Broadleaved trees include oaks, limes, sycamores and two walnuts.
Dunston Common	Dunston Common	3.8 hectares (9.4 acres)	Norwich; 52.574°N 1.284°E; TG 226 025	South Norfolk		Map	Details	Most of this site is grassland with flora including lady's bedstraw, harebell and sheep's sorrel. There is also an area of semi-mature woodland at the western end.
Earlham Park Woods	Earlham Park Wood	8.1 hectares (20 acres)	Norwich; 52.623°N 1.231°E; TG 188 077	Norwich		Map	Details	This is an area of woodland fringing Earlham Park, and trees include regenerating elms. Other habitats include tall marsh, unimproved grassland and a pond which has silted up.
Eaton Common	Eaton Common	5.3 hectares (13 acres)	Norwich; 52.598°N 1.259°E; TG 208 050	Norwich		Map	Details	This site on the bank of the River Yare is mainly grassland, some of which is marshy. There are also small areas of broadleaved woodland and tall herbs.
Felmingham Cutting	Felmingham Cutting	1.0 hectare (2.5 acres)	Norwich; 52.808°N 1.334°E; TG 248 286	North Norfolk		Map	Details	Sixteen species of butterfly breed on this railway cutting, which is on a former line of the Midland and Great Northern Railway, and is now part of the Weavers' Way long-distance footpath.
Great Eastern Pingo Trail	Great Eastern Pingo Trail	4.2 hectares (10 acres)	Thetford; 52.504°N 0.841°E; TL 929 934	Breckland	NCR, NWT, SAC, SPA, SSSI	Map	Details	This site has around 300 pingos, shallow pools formed when ice melted at the end of the last ice age. There is a mosaic of habitats with a large lake, Thompson Water, at the western end.
Hindringham Meadows	Hindringham Meadows	6.7 hectares (17 acres)	Fakenham; 52.900°N 0.920°E; TF 965 376	North Norfolk		Map	Details	No information is available about this site.
Knapton Cutting	Knapton Cutting	0.9 hectares (2.2 acres)	North Walsham; 52.845°N 1.412°E; TG 299 329	North Norfolk		Map	Details	Knapton Cutting is a footpath from Knapton to North Walsham along the former North Walsham to Mundesley railway line. A short stretch at the northern end is the LNR, called Knapton Cutting Butterfly Reserve. It has a variety of flowering plants, including small-flowered catchfly, which is classified as endangered in Britain.
Lion Wood	Lion Wood	8.9 hectares (22 acres)	Norwich; 52.629°N 1.320°E; TG 248 087	Norwich		Map	Details	Around a third of this wood is believed to be ancient. The dominant trees are oak and sycamore, and there is a variety of woodland birds such as blackcaps and green and greater spotted woodpeckers.
Litcham Common	Litcham Common	24.9 hectares (62 acres)	King's Lynn; 52.718°N 0.789°E; TF 885 170	Breckland		Map	Details	This heathland site has areas of acid grassland, wet and dry heath, scrub and mature oak and birch woodland.
Marston Marshes	Marston Marshes	25.9 hectares (64 acres)	Norwich; 52.602°N 1.268°E; TG 214 055	Norwich		Map	Details	This site in the flood plain of the River Yare has marshes, fen, dykes, scrub, wet woodland, dry grassland and five ponds. Flora include ragged robin and southern marsh orchid and there many invertebrates including the rare Desmoulin's whorl snail.
Mousehold Heath	Mousehold Heath	74.0 hectares (183 acres)	Norwich; 52.643°N 1.314°E; TG 243 102	Norwich	GCR, SSSI	Map	Details	This fragment of a formerly extensive heath has habitats including woodland, a pond, scrub and acid grassland. There are woodland birds such as song thrushes and great spotted woodpeckers.
Pigney's Wood	Pigney's Wood	20.9 hectares (52 acres)	North Walsham; 52.837°N 1.404°E; TG 294 320	North Norfolk	NWT	Map	Details	This wood has 40 different species of trees, most of which have been planted since 1993, but there is a 450 year old oak. There is also a range of birds, butterflies and dragonflies. Mammals include otters, water voles and badgers.
Roydon Fen	Roydon Fen	17.2 hectares (43 acres)	Diss; 52.375°N 1.085°E; TM 101 797	South Norfolk	SWT	Map	Details	This site was taken over by wet woodland in the twentieth century, but the SWT has restored the eastern end to fen by mowing, and it has many typical fen plants such as marsh helleborine, marsh fragrant orchid and sawsedge.
Smockmill Common	Smockmill Common	10.0 hectares (25 acres)	Norwich; 52.536°N 1.269°E; TM 218 981	South Norfolk		Map	Details	This site next to the River Tas has fen on the river bank and woodland and grassland in other areas. The flora is very diverse.
South Walsham Fen	South Walsham Fen	1.4 hectares (3.5 acres)	Norwich; 52.661°N 1.474°E; TG 350 127	Broadland		Map	Details	This nature reserve has semi-improved grassland and species-rich hedges which mark an ancient track. There are also areas of bracken and old woodland.
Southrepps Common	Southrepps Common	12.9 hectares (32 acres)	Norwich; 52.865°N 1.358°E; TG 261 350	North Norfolk	SAC SSSI	Map	Details	This is damp grassland and fen in the valley of the River Ant. There are several rare true flies characteristic of undisturbed wetlands, especially Pteromicra glabricula and Colobaea distincta, both of which have larvae which are parasitic on snails.
Toll's Meadow, Wymondham	Toll's Meadow	1.7 hectares (4.2 acres)	Wymondham; 52.567°N 1.113°E; TG 111 011	South Norfolk		Map	Details	The River Tiffey runs through this site, which has wet meadow and woodland. There is a variety of small birds and mammals include muntjac and roe deer, bank voles and common shrews.
Wensum Valley	Wensum Valley	8.2 hectares (20 acres)	Norwich; 52.640°N 1.265°E; TG 210 097	Norwich		Map	Details	This site is in two adjacent areas. Mile Cross Marsh has damp grassland and fen and Sycamore Crescent is a narrow stretch of mature oak and beech woodland with an understorey of elm and sycamore.
Whitlingham Marsh	Whitlingham Marsh	15.5 hectares (38 acres)	Norwich; 52.622°N 1.361°E; TG 276 080	South Norfolk		Map	Details	Most of this site on the southern bank of the River Yare is reed beds, which have many dragonflies. Chinese water deer sometimes browse in the marsh.
Wiveton Down	Wiveton Down	6.5 hectares (16 acres)	Holt; 52.937°N 1.024°E; TG 033 420	North Norfolk	SSSI	Map	Details	This is a classic example of an esker, a glacial crevasse which has been filled in until it forms a narrow winding ridge. It has been very important for teaching, research and demonstration.

== See also ==
- List of Sites of Special Scientific Interest in Norfolk
- Norfolk Wildlife Trust

== Sources ==
- Ratcliffe, Derek, ed. (1977). A Nature Conservation Review. Vol. 2. Cambridge, UK: Cambridge University Press. ISBN 978-0-521-21403-2.
