= List of parks, gardens and open spaces in Norwich =

The City of Norwich, England, as of 2011, had 23 parks, 95 open spaces and 59 natural areas in the care of the local authority.

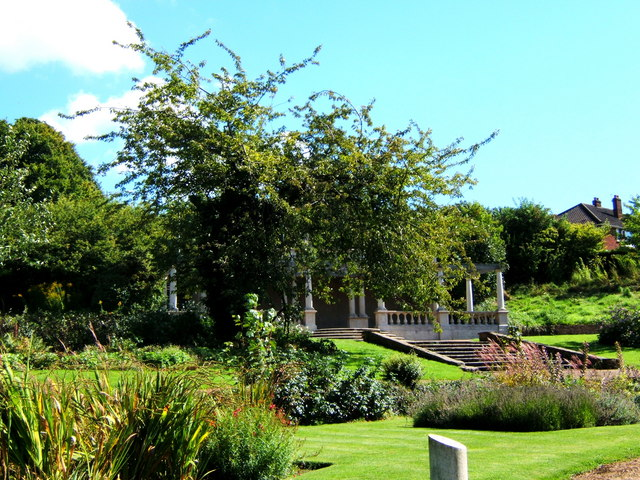
Wensum Park

== Historic parks ==
The four Grade II listed historic parks were purpose built in the 1920s and 1930s under the direction of Parks Superintendent Captain Sandys-Winsch. His designs included buildings, structures and hard landscaping which are finished in a modernist pre-cast concrete, with unemployed men providing much of the labour. By the late 1990s many of the structures had fallen into disrepair. A successful application to the Heritage Lottery Fund enabled major refurbishment to the four main parks.

- Heigham Park 52.626°N 1.2676°E is located in the city's Golden Triangle district and opened in 1924. Amenities include a children's playground, bowling green, playing field, tennis courts and a small pond. Specimen beech including several copper beech trees form a boundary around much of the park. In addition, there are herbaceous borders, shrubberies and a wisteria covered concrete pergola which was part of the original design.
- Wensum Park 52.6406°N 1.2862°E was completed in 1925. The riverside park features many mature trees, flower beds, picnic area, children's playground and paddling pool and still retains Captain Sandys-Winsch's concrete pavilion and architecture. As part of the city's millennium celebrations a labyrinth was installed in the centre of the park.
- Eaton Park 52.6205°N 1.2571°E covers 80 acres (32 ha) and lies to the west of the city centre. The flagship park was opened by the Prince of Wales in 1928. Several of Sandys-Winsch's structures remain including the central rotunda, bandstand, model boating pond and lily pond. The park offers a wide range of sporting facilities.
- Waterloo Park 52.6451°N 1.2894°E is located to the north of the city centre and enveloped between Angel Road and Aylsham Road A1024. Covering 18.5 acres (7.5 ha) the park was opened in 1933 and boasts one of the largest herbaceous borders in a UK public park. Other amenities include a refurbished paddling pool (2011), children's playground, playing field, tennis courts and bowling green. Many of the original architectural features remain including the pavilion, bandstand and hard landscaping.

== Parks ==
Listed below are a selection of the city's parks. Many date back to 1920s and 1930s.

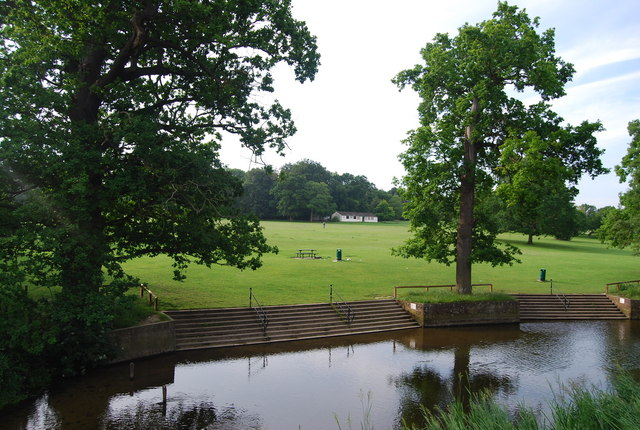
Earlham Park with the River Yare in foreground

- Chapelfield Gardens 52.6275°N 1.2878°E is located in central Norwich. At its time of opening in 1880 it was one of the few public open spaces in the city centre. The park is named after the Chapel of St Mary and has always been an open space. Today (2011) facilities include a restaurant, bandstand, children's playground, pétanque court, giant chess and draughts table. Different events are hosted in the park including bandstand concerts, annual music festival and travelling funfairs. Over 190 trees representing 45 native and foreign species can be found as well as many shrubs and flower beds.
- Earlham Park 52.6271°N 1.2349°E lies 3 miles (4.8 km) west of the city centre adjacent to the Earlham Road and covers 88 acres (36 ha) of open parkland sloping towards the River Yare. Earlham Hall Park was bought by the local authority in 1925, part of which became the site for the University of East Anglia. Contained within the park is Earlham Hall its outbuildings and formal gardens. The open park area can be hired for public events.
- Harford Park 52.6055°N 1.2839°E is approximately 3 miles (4.8 km) south of the city centre close to the A140 Ipswich Road. Facilities include a cycle speedway track, bowling green, five-a-side football pitch and children's play area. Also contained within the park is Harford Community Centre community centre.
- Jubilee Park 52.6138°N 1.298°E is located in the Lakenham area approximately 2 miles (3.2 km) south of the city centre. Facilities in the park include an adventure playground and a floodlight sports court.
- Mile Cross Gardens 52.6542°N 1.2783°E are two identical shaped gardens located at the junction of Suckling Avenue and the Aylsham Road. The listed Grade II gardens were laid out to a design by Sandys-Winsch and contain some original features and were opened in May 1929. Today (2013) the south garden is kept as a wildlife friendly area and the northern garden is a children's playground.
- St Clements Park 52.652°N 1.297°E lies approximately 2 miles (3.2 km) north of the city centre close to Woodcock Road. The open grassed area features a small children's playground. In April 2011, the park became the city's first eco-park with funding from the Big Lottery Fund and support from local schools and the community.
- Sewell Park52.6455°N 1.2977°E is located approximately 1.5 miles (2.4 km) north of the city centre adjacent to Constitution Hill. The sloping south-facing park contains a children's play area, mature trees and has a close historical connection to the family of Anna Sewell, author of Black Beauty.
- Sloughbottom Park 52.6461°N 1.2661°E is located 3 miles (4.8 km) north-west of the city centre close to the A1067 Drayton Road. The park was officially opened in 1929 and was built as part of an unemployment alleviation scheme. The large, square, functional park features several football pitches, a children's playground and an all-weather sports court. Located close to its boundary with Marriott's Way part of the National Cycle Route 1 is the Sloughbottom Park BMX course. Of architectural interest is the Sandys-Winsch pavilion which is currently used as a dressing room for sports people.

== Open spaces ==
Listed below are the local nature reserves and the Site of Special Scientific Interest located within the city boundaries.

=== Local nature reserves ===
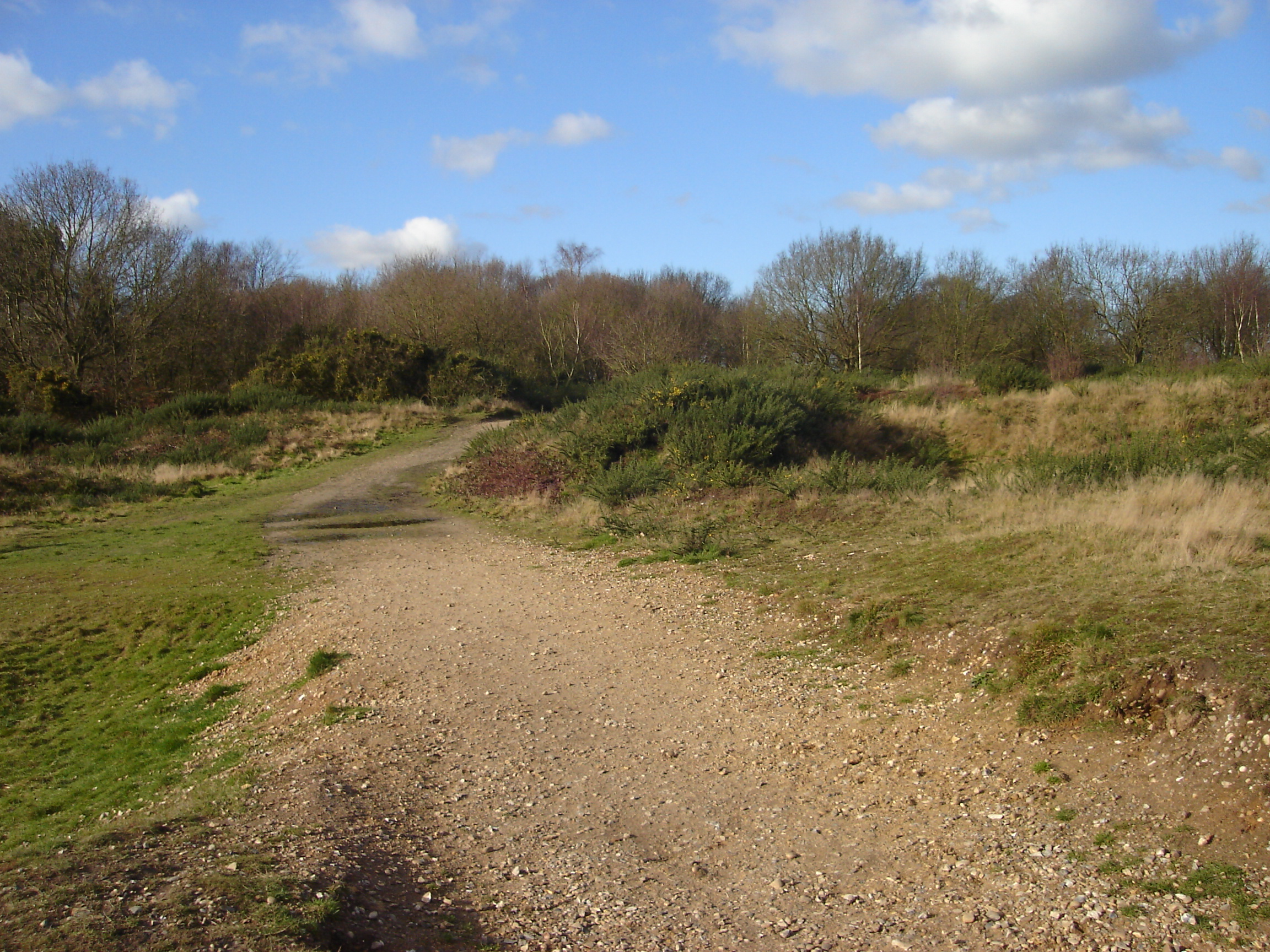
Mousehold Heath

- Bowthorpe Marsh 52.6337°N 1.2245°E is located in Bowthorpe approximately 3.5 miles (5.6 km) from the city centre. Covering 5.7 hectares (14 acres) of low-lying unimproved grassland which is crossed by a network of drainage ditches. The site lies adjacent to the River Yare and can be reached by public footpaths. Horses graze the site throughout the year.
- Danby Wood 52.6033°N 1.2763°E is a semi-natural broad-leaved woodland located close to the Ipswich Road approximately 2.5 miles (4.0 km) south of the city centre. The reserve covers 3.4 hectares (8.4 acres) on a site of a former chalk quarry. Tree species including oak, sycamore, ash and lime have colonised the site. Flora including snowdrops, arum lily, bluebell and a variety of woodland birds have been recorded at the reserve.
- Earlham Park Woods 52.6246°N 1.2315°E is located on the edge of Earlham Park and is also known as Violet Grove and the Heronry. Covering 7.8 hectares (19 acres) the reserve has a diverse range of habitat including dense tall marsh, unimproved neutral grassland, woodland and a pond which has been dredged creating open water.
- Eaton Common 52.5991°N 1.2601°E lies adjacent to the River Yare in Eaton approximately 4 miles (6.4 km) south-west of the city centre. Covering 6.2 hectares (15 acres) of largely neutral grassland with small areas of tall herb and some broad-leaved woodland. The reserve is grazed by cattle in the summer months.
- Lion Wood 52.6294°N 1.3227°E covers 9.2 hectares (23 acres) and lies approximately 1.5 miles (2.4 km) east of the city centre close to the Thorpe Road. The wood which was mentioned in the Domesday Book of 1086 contains many mature trees, especially sycamore and oak. Other species present are chestnut, beech, hornbeam and birch. Flora including bluebells and a range of woodland birds including jay and green woodpecker have been recorded.
- Marston Marsh 52.60291°N 1.26905°E covers 26 hectares (64 acres) and is located 3.5 miles (5.6 km) south-west of the city centre close to the A140 road. The reserve comprises a flood plain which is grazed by cattle bounded by the River Yare. Numerous dykes bisect the site which are managed rotationally. Small areas of damp woodland and five wildlife ponds can be found. Good marsh flora including orchids have been recorded. Footpaths link the reserve to Eaton Common and Danby Wood.
- Mousehold Heath 52.6454°N 1.3145°E at 92 hectares (230 acres) is the largest open space in the city. Approximately 1.5 miles (2.4 km) north-east of the city centre and bounded by several main roads. Formerly heathland, the reserve is mostly given over to broad-leaved semi-natural woodland with a few pockets of heath remaining. Species of interest include heather, lizards and woodland birds. A number of sports pitches are contained within the site.
- Wensum Local Nature Reserve 52.6392°N 1.2649°E is located approximately 2 miles (3.2 km) north-west of the city centre and encompasses two sites; Sycamore Crescent Wood and Mile Cross Marsh. Both reserves are linked by public footpaths. The reserve has a wide range of habitat including woodland, meadows, riverbank and marshes.

=== Site of Special Scientific Interest ===
- Sweetbriar Road Meadows 52.6407°N 1.2628°E is a SSSI covering 23.55 acres (9.53 ha). The site is approximately 3 miles (4.8 km) to the west of the city centre. It consists of a series of unimproved water-meadows which support a diverse range of habitat. The site is privately owned with no public right of way, but can be viewed from public paths which bound the site.

== Gardens ==
The following privately owned gardens open to the public occasionally in aid of charity.

- The Bear Shop 52.6321°N 1.2969°E is a small, riverside garden to the rear of a 15th-century house (Today, retail premises) in the Elm Hill area of Norwich. Considered to be based on a design by Gertrude Jekyll, the well stocked garden features many herbaceous plants and topiary.
- The Bishop's House 52.633°N 1.3027°E garden is located within the grounds of Norwich Cathedral. Covering 4 acres (1.6 ha), the walled garden dating back to the 12th century holds many rare and unusual shrubs and trees. Other features include rose beds, herbaceous borders, kitchen garden and a meadow labyrinth.

Listed below are gardens open regularly to the public.

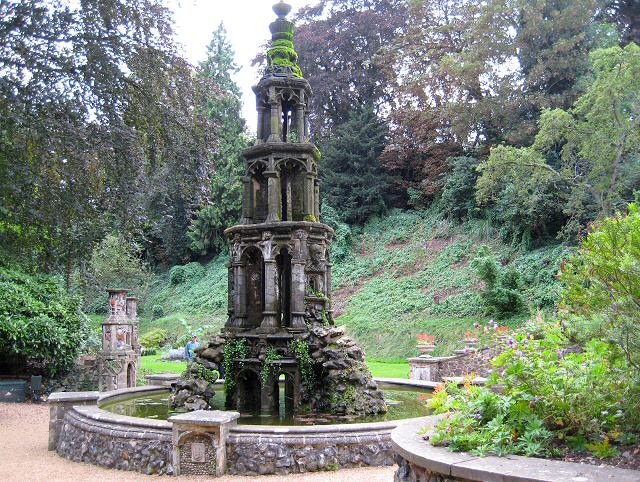
The fountain in the Plantation Garden

- Grapes Hill Community Garden 52.6317°N 1.2844°E is a small city centre garden close to the Norwich Inner Ring road. Created from a disused, tarmaced play area, it was officially opened in 2011. The garden is tended by volunteers and contains a large number of edible plants together with a wide choice of wild and woodland flowers, grasses, shrubs and trees. Raised beds, with access for wheelchair users and individuals to grow vegetables are available for hire.
- Plantation Garden 52.6290°N 1.2819°E is a Victorian city centre garden adjacent to St John the Baptist Cathedral. Sheltered by mature trees the garden comprises approximately 3 acres (1.2 ha) and contains many original and restored features including a Gothic fountain and an Italianate terrace. Planting includes summer and winter bedding shrubs and trees.
