= The Ice House, Great Yarmouth =

Former ice house in Great Yarmouth, England

The Ice House
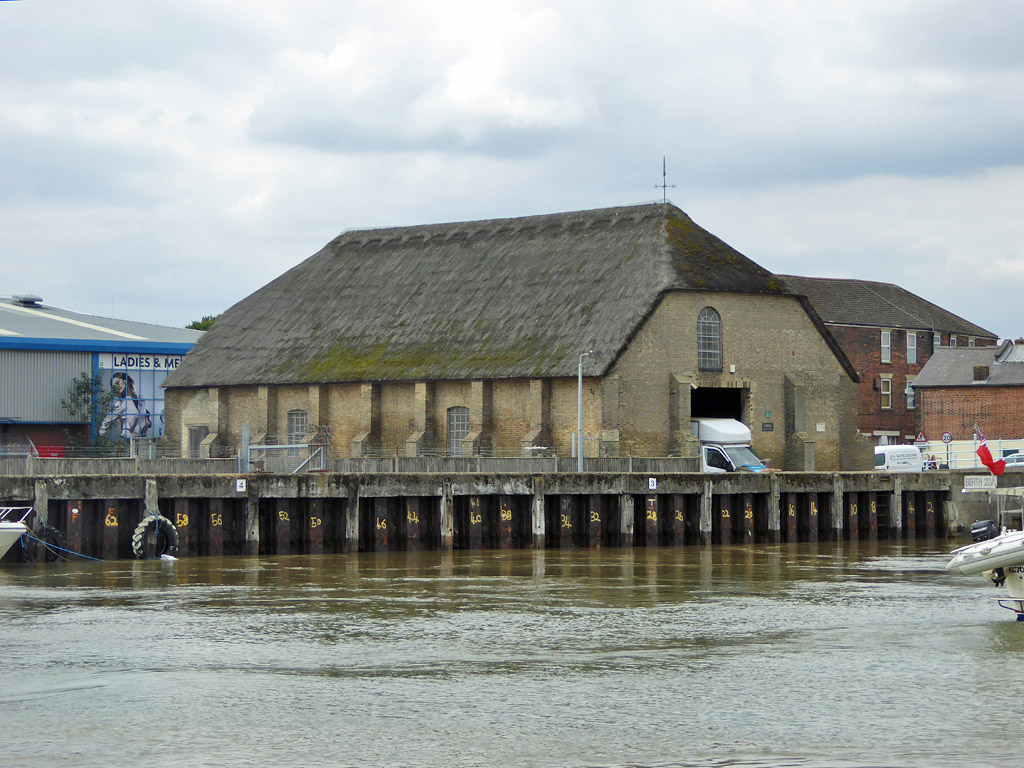
- The Ice House in 2018

General information
- Type: Former ice house
- Location: Great Yarmouth, United Kingdom
- Coordinates: 52.60626°N 1.72245°E
- Grid position: TG 5213 0744

Height
- Roof: Thatched, half-hipped

Technical details
- Structural system: Buttresses

Design and construction
- Awards: 1981 Craftsmanship Award

The Ice House is a former ice house and Grade II listed building in Great Yarmouth, Norfolk, England. Located by Haven Bridge on the River Yare, it was a key asset in the town’s then-strong fishing industry, and is thought to be the only ice house of its type left in the country with a capacity of 42,588 cubic feet. In 2024, it began a conversion into a National Centre for Outdoor Arts and Circus.

== History ==
Built between 1851 and 1892, around the same time as the local railway station, it was used for storing ice, at first from South Walsham Broad delivered by wherry and later from Norway. A second icehouse once stood alongside it, built between 1851 and 1892. The ice house became a significant part of the town's thriving fishing industry; when herrings were caught, they were packed in ice at the ice house and then transported elsewhere, including the Billingsgate fish market in London. Its last recorded wherry load of ice dates to 1898 or 1899. It stayed in use until around 1910.

In December 1976 it became a Grade II listed building, and won the 1981 Craftsmanship Award. It was restored in 1980 or 1990 by Olley & Haward under architect T. R. Bird.

In September 2023, the National Lottery Heritage Fund announced that it would contribute £1.9 million to convert the historic building into the National Arts and Circus Centre, a training and performance space, allowing such training to expand from its operation in the town's Drill House. Additional funding involved £450,000 from Great Yarmouth Town Deal, £350,000 from the Architectural Heritage Fund, £50,000 from the Great Yarmouth Borough Council, and £20,000 from the local town fertiliser company Brineflow. In February 2024, work began on the building, with Out There Arts planning to transform it into a National Centre for Outdoor Arts and Circus by May 2025. This was successful and in May 2025, the Out There Festival, an outdoor arts festival in the town, was centred at the Ice House.

== Architecture ==
The building consists of gault brick under a half-hipped thatched roof, and features eight bays to its north and south side, separated by stepped buttresses. Its south side has two arched windows. On its east and west sides are two and three stepped buttresses respectively; both these sides have one arched window. The east side of the building has a pair of 20th century timber doors.
