= Herring Bridge =

Bridge in Great Yarmouth, England

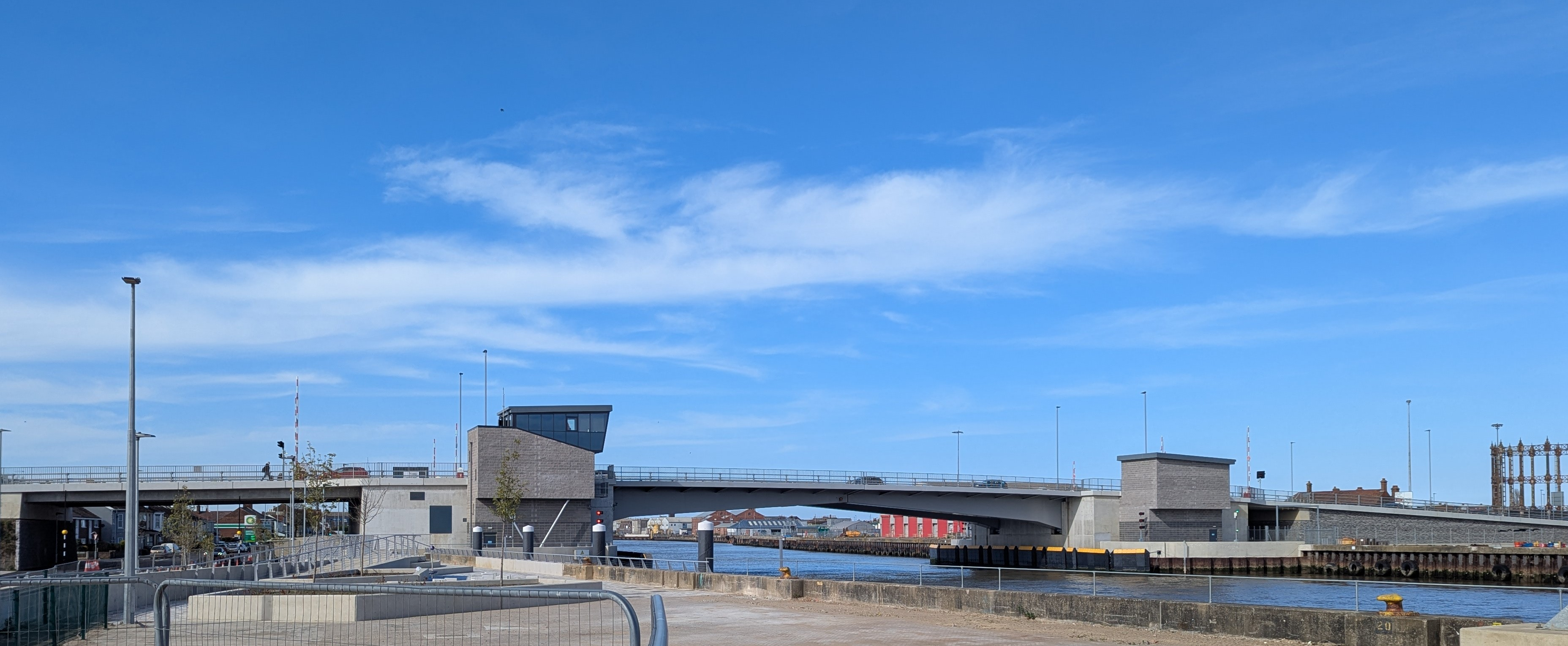
- Herring Bridge in April 2025
- Coordinates: 52.59300°N 1.72607°E
- Crosses: River Yare
- Locale: Great Yarmouth, Norfolk, England
- Named for: Great Yarmouth's historical herring fishing industry

History
- Contracted lead designer: Bam Farrans
- Construction cost: £121 million
- Opened: February 1, 2024

Herring Bridge, also called the Third River Crossing, is a bascule bridge over the River Yare in Great Yarmouth, Norfolk, England. It is named after the town's historical herring fishing industry. Completed in 2024, its construction was delayed due to several issues, including the explosion of a World War II bomb.

== History ==
=== 2007–2017: Campaigns and funding ===
Campaigners had pressed for the construction of a third crossing of the River Yare in Yarmouth for 10 years before it received significant funding. They had drawn up plans and raised £4 million for its construction in advance. The plans were later publicly revealed to include a new five-arm roundabout, an opening function which would take about five and a half minutes to execute, dedicated pedestrian pavements, and an off-carriageway cycling route. 19,400 vehicles a day were predicted to use the route in 2023 according to the plans, rising to 21,700 in 2038.

Significant amounts of funding were first announced in the November 2017 United Kingdom budget under Chancellor of the Exchequer Philip Hammond. The budget granted £98 million for the route, with its total cost estimated at £120 million. A public consultation began in 2018.

The bridge's linking of two enterprise zones were predicted to create 5,000 jobs by 2025, and it was expected to reduce traffic congestion in the town. Construction was hoped to start in 2020 and finish by 2023. Other aims included easier movement from Gorleston-on-Sea to Great Yarmouth and full access from the port area of the town to the A47 road.

=== Feb–Apr 2021: Demolitions and initial construction ===
Demolition of vacant houses bought by the council on Queen Anne's Road began in February 2021, followed by further demolition on Southtown Road and commercial units in the Suffolk Road Enterprise Park. This demolition phase was expected to finish in April that year. Construction contractor Bam Farrans took on the bridge's construction. For use as a ballast, thousands of tonnes of sand and soil were recycled from a former World War I runway at South Denes.

=== 7 Feb 2023: World War II bomb explosion ===
On 7 February 2023, a 250kg World War II bomb about 1 metre long was found close to two gas pipes on the bridge's construction site, on Southtown Road. It is speculated that the bomb was dropped during a German bombing raid on 9 April 1941. The military put cordons in place at 200 and 400 metres away, and ordered the evacuation of 230 properties that stood within the inner cordon, strongly advising that those in the outer cordon also move. An additional no-fly zone of up to 2,000ft was put in place. They constructed a protective sand barrier around the bomb.

Shortly after the beginning of attempts to disarm the bomb, at 5pm on 10 February, an unplanned detonation occurred. There were no reports of injuries, and residents nearby were allowed to return to their homes, though there was damage to a number of car windows, the top of the scaffolding on the bridge and the flood wall. The gas pipes were not damaged. Southtown Road was reopened the next day, though the explosion held back the bridge project by around 10 days.

=== 2023–24: Naming and continued construction ===
Following a public vote, the bridge was named Herring Bridge on 2 March 2023, after the herring fishing industry that brought the town its wealth. Almost 6,000 votes were cast, with other names including Queen's Gate, Britannia Bridge, Yare Bridge and King's Bridge, with Herring Bridge receiving 2,710 of the votes.

The first sections of the bridge, its two lifting spans, arrived in Great Yarmouth from Belgium on 10 March 2023, and were to be installed during a 72-hour window in which the Yare was blocked. Work on the bridge was temporarily halted for several more days due to the discovery of a vole burrow which is protected by the Wildlife and Countryside Act 1981. In September 2023, the decision was made by contractor Bam Farrans that the opening of the bridge, scheduled that month, was to be indefinitely delayed due to several outstanding issues. The opening was then pushed to January 2024.

=== 2024–present: Opening and operation ===
The bridge was opened on 1 February 2024, having cost £121 million, at 11:45 am for pedestrians and 3 pm for traffic. The opening was attended by a convoy of traffic and over 200 schoolchildren on foot, as well as 105-year-old Genna Brown who as a schoolgirl had seen the nearby Haven Bridge open in 1933. The bridge broke down temporarily on 4 and 5 February, and again on 13 March, and was closed indefinitely on 14 March for repairs. It reopened on 20 March after a new locking sensor was fitted.

On the anniversary of its opening in 2025, Norfolk County Council cabinet member for transport Graham Plant said the bridge has "reduced congestion considerably", and that traffic at the Haven Bridge and Breydon Bridge was reduced.
