= Elm Road Field, Thetford =

UK Site of Special Scientific Interest

Coordinates: 52.340°N 0.731°E

- Site of Special Scientific Interest
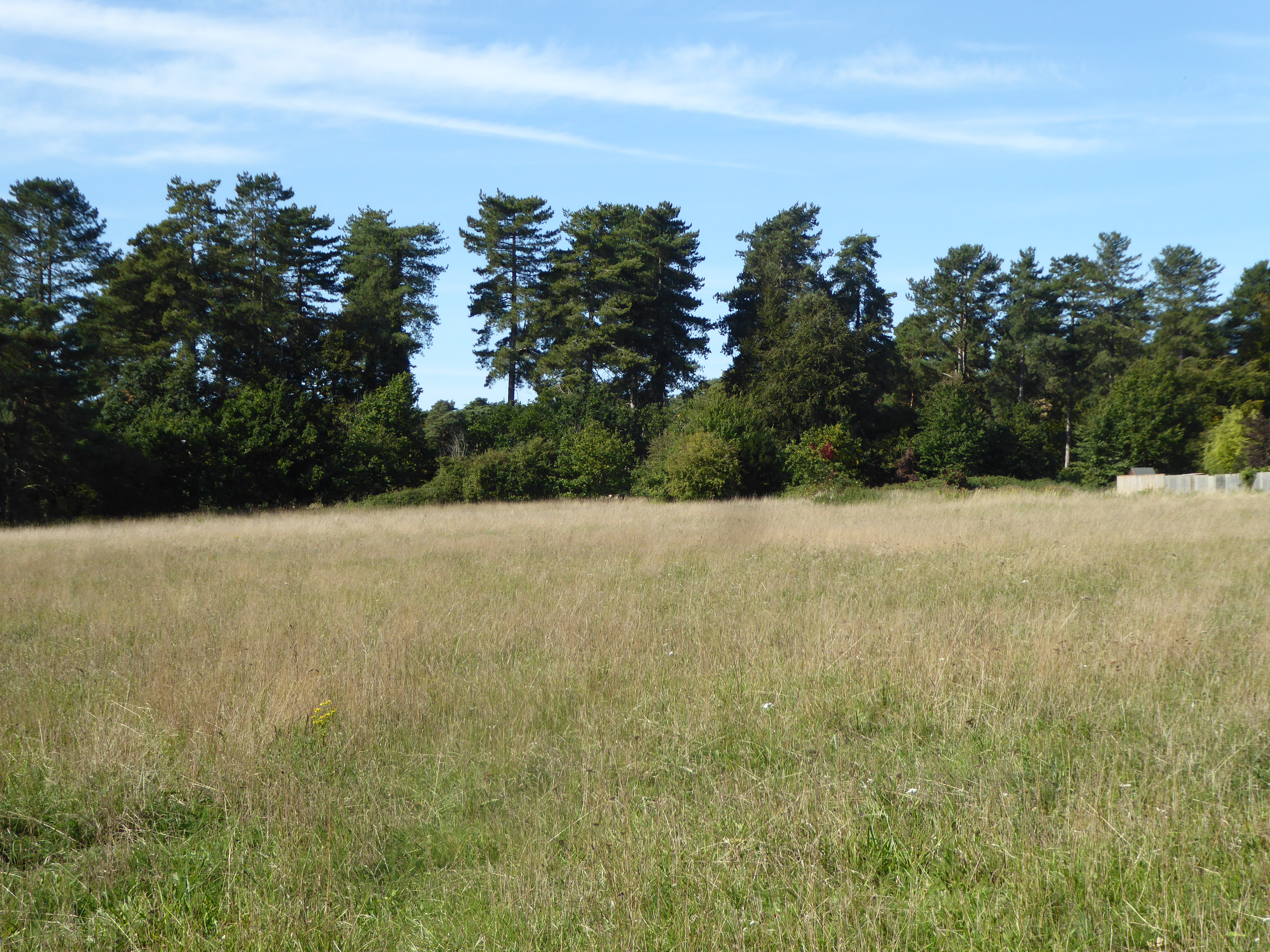
- Location of Elm Road Field, Thetford.
- Area of search: Norfolk
- Grid reference: TL 859 815
- Interest: Biological
- Area: 5.0 hectares (12 acres)
- Notification date: 1996
- Location map: Magic Map

Elm Road Field, Thetford is a 5-hectare (12-acre) biological Site of Special Scientific Interest on the southern outskirts of Thetford in Norfolk, England.

This area of open space has grassland with a rich flora. There are a number of uncommon plants, including the nationally endangered field wormwood and the nationally scarce sickle medick and tower mustard. There are two mature scots pine hedges.

There is access from Laburnum Grove and Barnham Cross Common.

== Land ownership ==
All land within Elm Road Field Thetford SSSI is owned by the local authority
