= Dunston Common =

Nature reserve in United Kingdom

Coordinates: 52.574°N 1.284°E

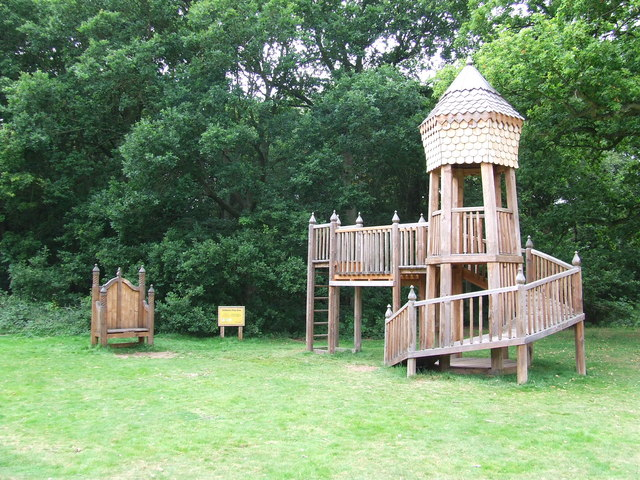
- Interactive map of Dunston Common
- Type: Local Nature Reserve
- Location: , Norfolk
- OS grid: TG 226 025
- Area: 3.8 hectares (9.4 acres)
- Manager: South Norfolk District Council

Dunston Common is a 3.8-hectare (9.4-acre) Local Nature Reserve south of Norwich in Norfolk. It is owned and managed by South Norfolk District Council.

Most of this site is grassland with flora including lady's bedstraw, harebell and sheep's sorrel. There is also an area of semi-mature woodland at the western end.

There is access from Stoke Lane.
