= Smockmill Common =

Local Nature Reserve in Norfolk, England

Coordinates: 52.536°N 1.269°E

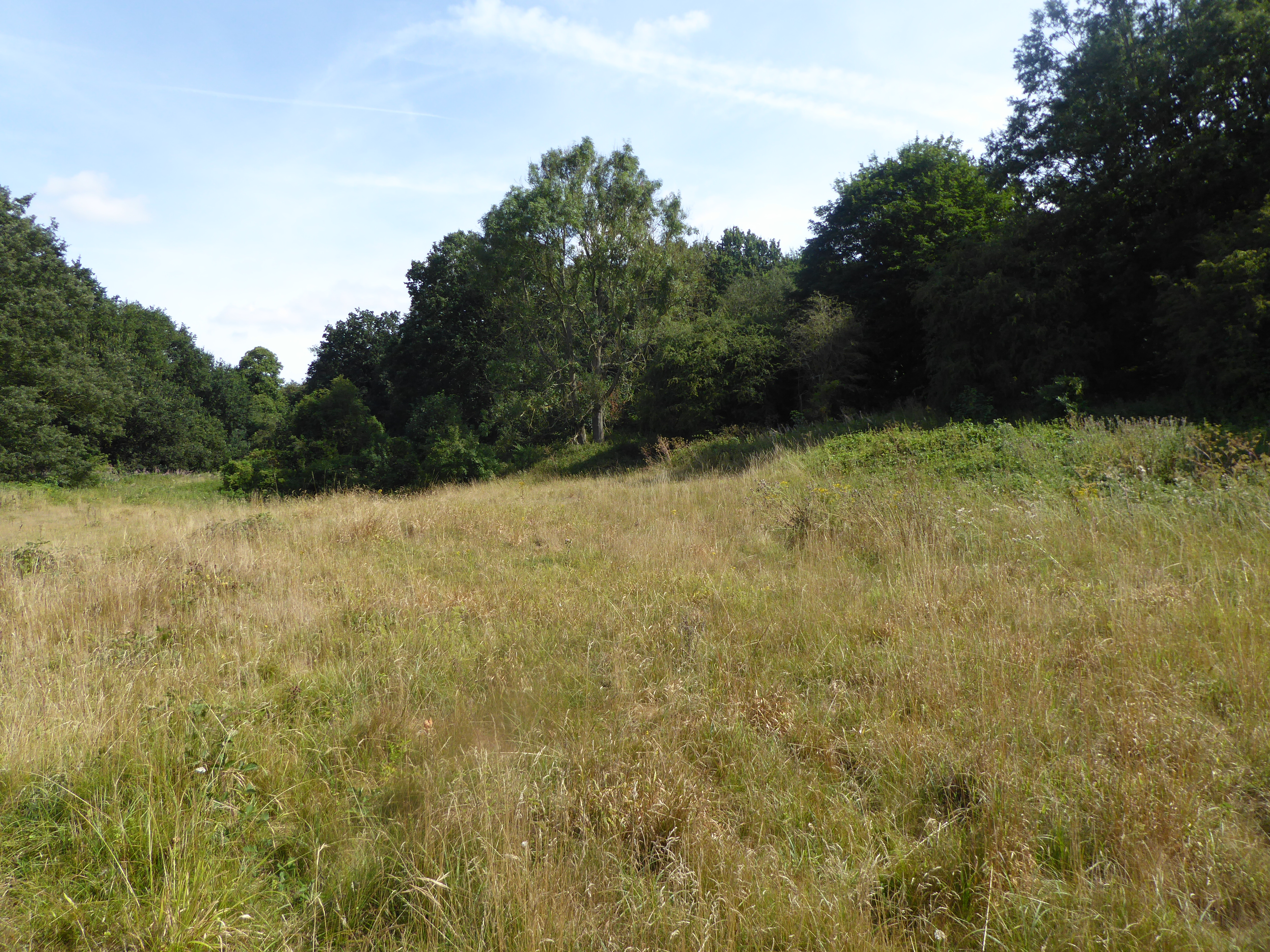
- Interactive map of Smockmill Common
- Type: Local Nature Reserve
- Location: Newton Flotman, Norfolk
- OS grid: TM 218 981
- Area: 10.0 hectares (25 acres)
- Manager: South Norfolk District Council

Smockmill Common is a 10-hectare (25-acre) Local Nature Reserve on the eastern outskirts of Newton Flotman in Norfolk. It is owned by the Shotesham Estate and managed by South Norfolk District Council.

This site next to the River Tas has fen on the river bank and woodland and grassland in other areas. The flora is very diverse.

There is access from Cargate Lane.
