= Knapton Cutting =

Nature reserve in Norfolk, England

Coordinates: 52.845°N 1.412°E

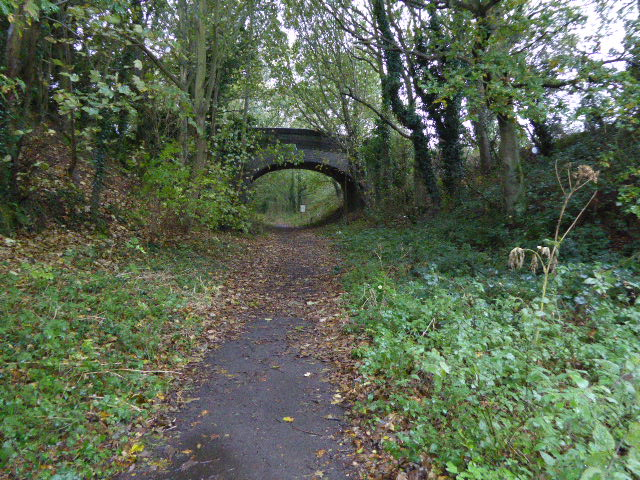
- Interactive map of Knapton Cutting
- Type: Local Nature Reserve
- Location: Knapton, Norfolk
- OS grid: TG 299 329
- Area: 0.9 hectares (2.2 acres)
- Manager: North Norfolk District Council

Knapton Cutting Butterfly Reserve is a 0.9-hectare (2.2-acre) Local Nature Reserve (LNR) south of Knapton in Norfolk. It is owned and managed by North Norfolk District Council.

Knapton Cutting is a footpath from Knapton to North Walsham along the former North Walsham to Mundesley railway line. A short stretch at the northern end is the LNR, called Knapton Cutting Butterfly Reserve. It has a variety of flowering plants, including small-flowered catchfly, which is classified as endangered in Britain.

There is access from Hall Lane.
