= Southrepps Common =

UK Site of Special Scientific Interest

Coordinates: 52.865°N 1.358°E

- Site of Special Scientific Interest
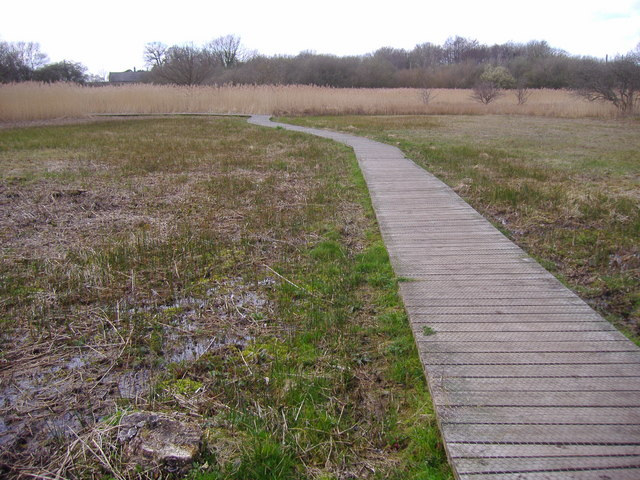
- Location of Southrepps Common.
- Area of search: Norfolk
- Grid reference: TG 261 350
- Interest: Biological
- Area: 5.6 hectares (14 acres)
- Notification date: 1990
- Location map: Magic Map

Southrepps Common is a 5.6-hectare (14-acre) biological Site of Special Scientific Interest north of North Walsham in Norfolk, England. A larger area of 12.9-hectare (32-acre) is a Local Nature Reserve. It is owned by Southrepps Parish Council and managed by Southrepps Common Group. It is part of the Norfolk Valley Fens Special Area of Conservation.

This is damp grassland and fen in the valley of the River Ant. There are several rare true flies characteristic of undisturbed wetlands, especially Pteromicra glabricula and Colobaea distincta, both of which have larvae which are parasitic on snails.

The site is open to the public
