= Hindringham Meadows =

Nature reserve in Norfolk, England

Coordinates: 52.900°N 0.920°E

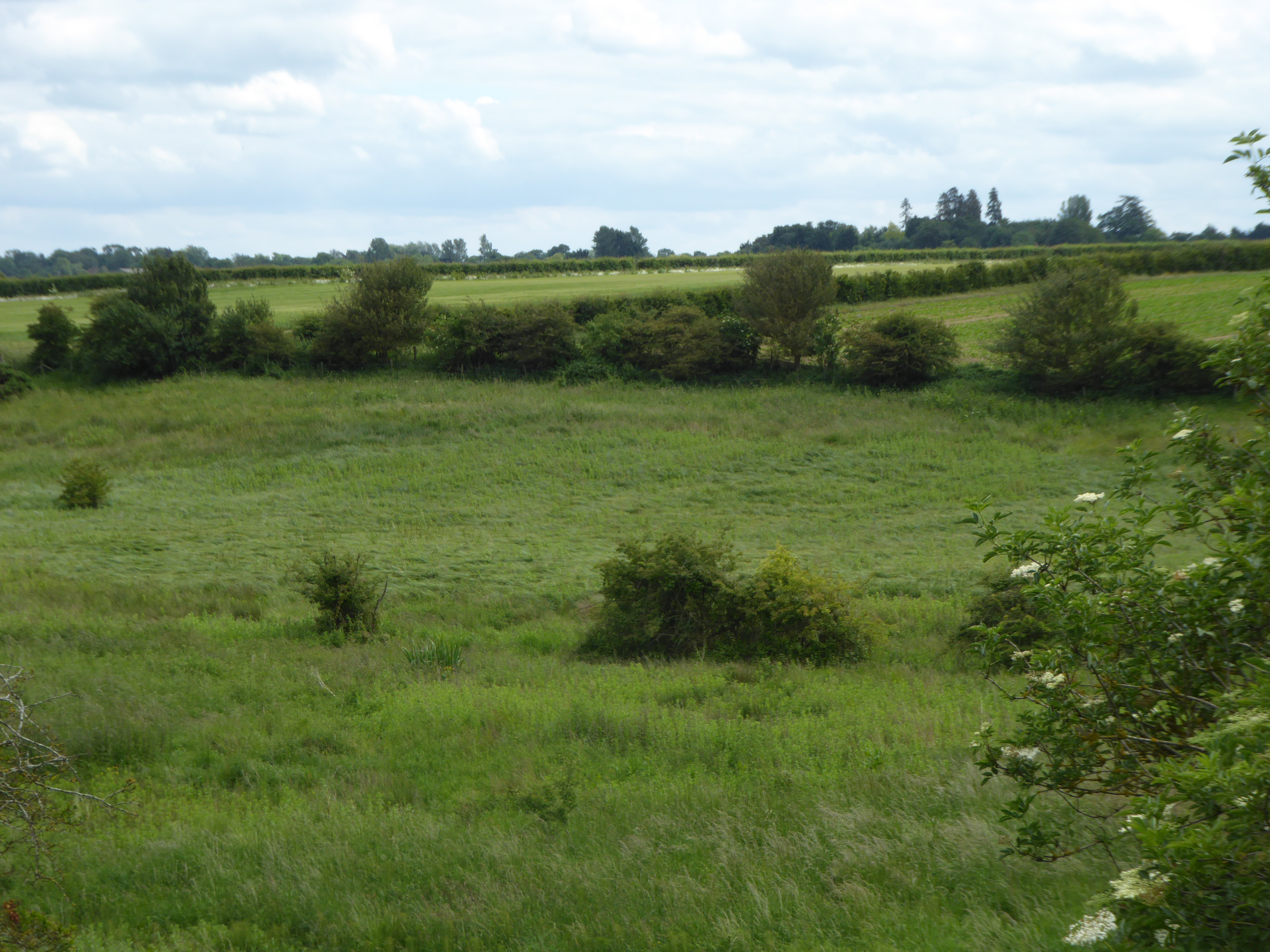
- Interactive map of Hindringham Meadows
- Type: Local Nature Reserve
- Location: Hindringham, Fakenham, Norfolk
- OS grid: TF 965 376
- Area: 6.7 hectares (17 acres)
- Manager: North Norfolk District Council

Hindringham Meadows is a 6.7-hectare (17-acre) Local Nature Reserve near Hindringham, north of Fakenham in Norfolk. It is owned and managed by North Norfolk District Council.

The site is accessed from a road to its north.
