= Whitlingham Marsh =

Nature reserve in Norwich, England

Coordinates: 52.622°N 1.361°E

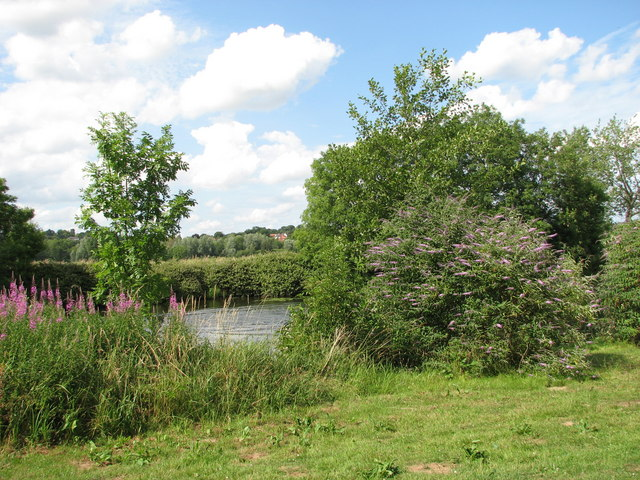
- Interactive map of Whitlingham Marsh
- Type: Local Nature Reserve
- Location: Norwich, Norfolk
- OS grid: TG 276 080
- Area: 15.5 hectares (38 acres)
- Manager: Whitlingham Charitable Trust and the Broads Authority

Whitlingham Marsh is a 15.5-hectare (38-acre) Local Nature Reserve in Norwich in Norfolk, England. It is owned by South Norfolk District Council and managed by the Whitlingham Charitable Trust and the Broads Authority.

Most of this site on the southern bank of the River Yare is reed beds, which have many dragonflies. Chinese water deer sometimes browse in the marsh.

There is public access to the site.
