= Brundall Church Fen =

Park in Norfolk, United Kingdom

Coordinates: 52.603°N 1.275°E

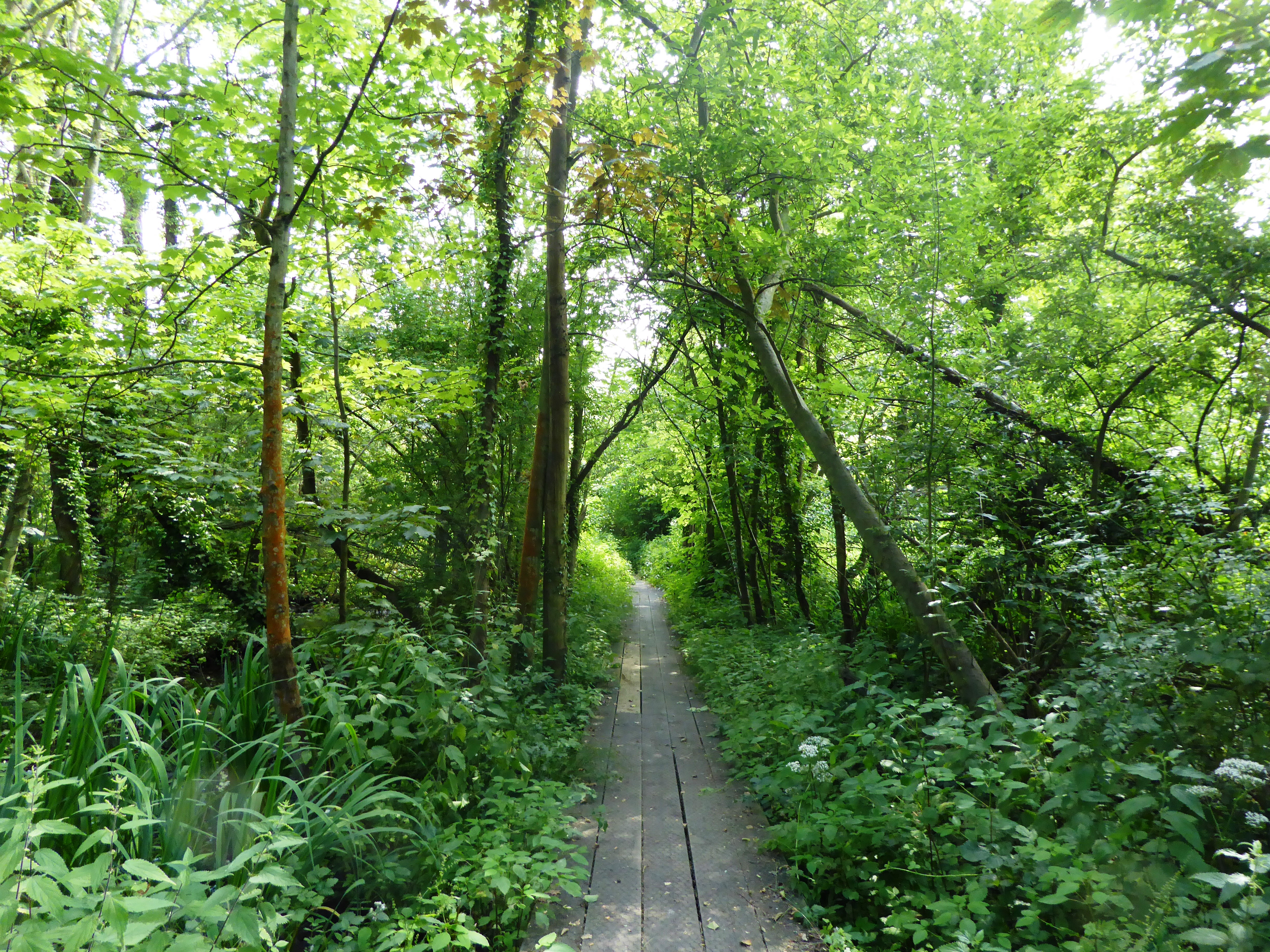
- Interactive map of Brundall Church Fen
- Type: Local Nature Reserve
- Location: Brundall, Norfolk
- OS grid: TG 320 081
- Area: 2.8 hectares (6.9 acres)
- Manager: Brundall Parish Council and Norfolk County Council and the Broads Authority

Brundall Church Fen is a 2.8-hectare (6.9-acre) Local Nature Reserve Norfolk. It is owned by Brundall Parish Council and managed by Brundall Parish Council and Norfolk County Council and the Broads Authority.

Fauna in this former gazing marsh include water voles, foxes, Chinese water deer and occasionally otters.

There is access from Church Lane.
