= Felmingham Cutting =

Nature reserve in Norfolk, England

Coordinates: 52.808°N 1.334°E

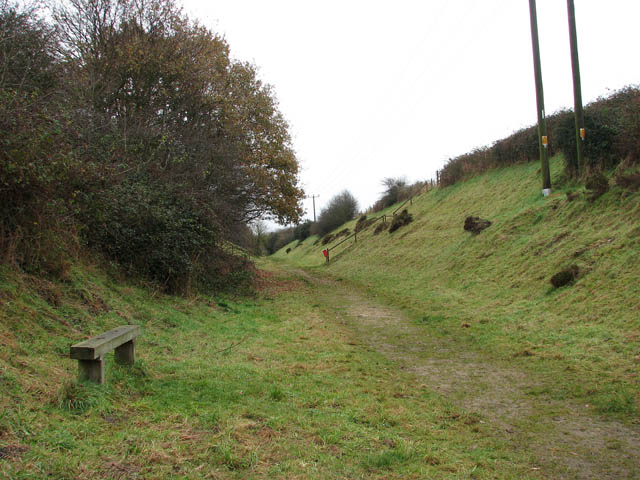
- Interactive map of Felmingham Cutting
- Type: Local Nature Reserve
- Location: Felmingham, Norfolk
- OS grid: TG 248 286
- Area: 1.0 hectare (2.5 acres)
- Manager: North Norfolk District Council

Felmingham Cutting is a 1-hectare (2.5-acre) Local Nature Reserve west of North Walsham in Norfolk. It is owned by North Norfolk District Council and managed by Butterfly Conservation.

Sixteen species of butterfly breed on this railway cutting, which is on a former line of the Midland and Great Northern Railway, and is now part of the Weavers' Way long-distance footpath.

There is access along the Weavers Way from North Walsham.
