= Marston Marshes =

Nature reserve in Norfolk, England

Coordinates: 52.602°N 1.268°E

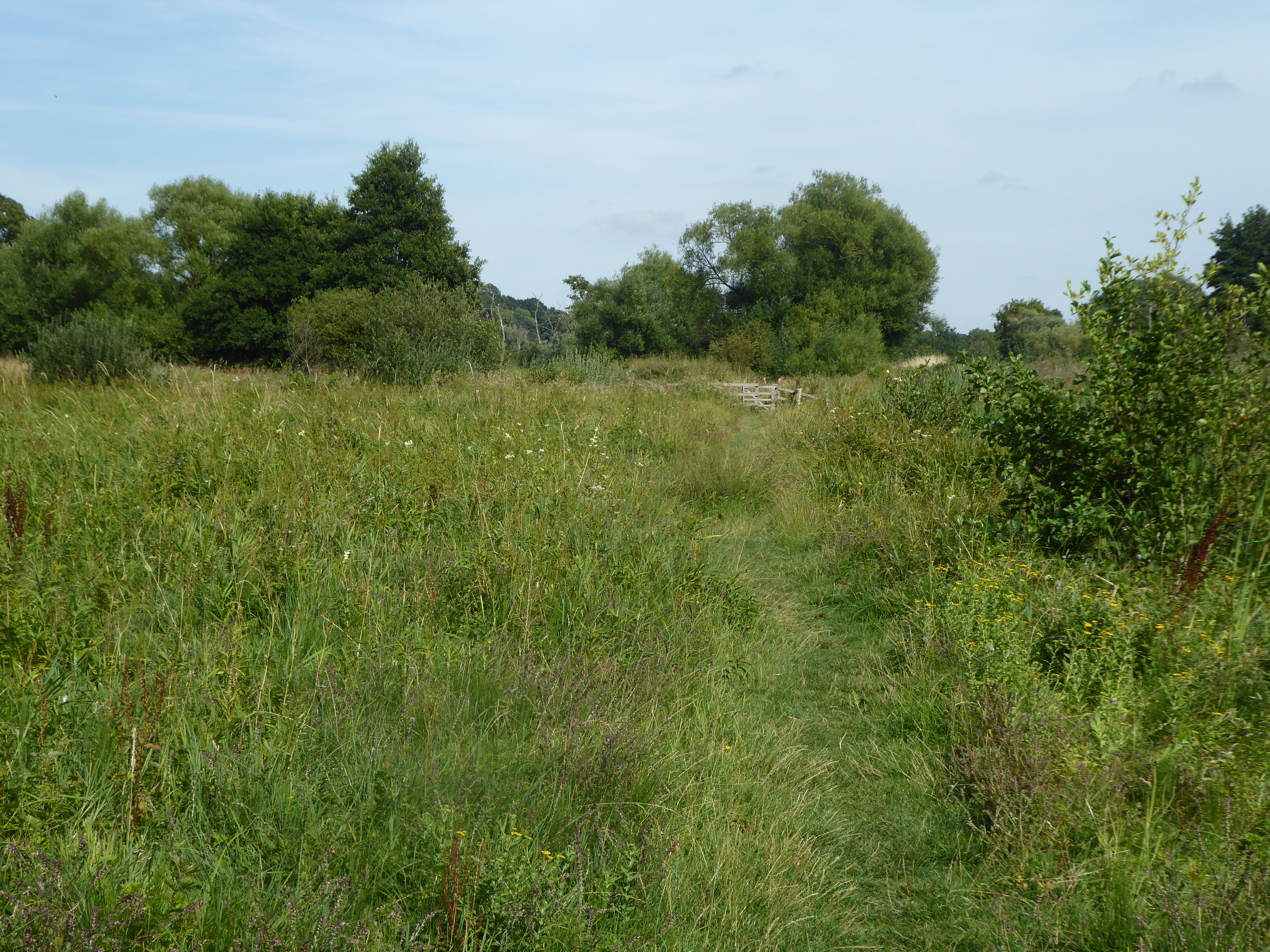
- Interactive map of Marston Marshes
- Type: Local Nature Reserve
- Location: Norfolk
- OS grid: TG 214 055
- Area: 25.9 hectares (64 acres)
- Manager: Norwich City Council

Marston Marshes is a 25.9-hectare (64-acre) Local Nature Reserve on the southern outskirts of Norwich in Norfolk. It is owned and managed by Norwich City Council.

This site in the flood plain of the River Yare has marshes (hence the name), fen, dykes, scrub, wet woodland, dry grassland and five ponds. A herd of grazing cattle are often present on the site. Flora include ragged robin and southern marsh orchid and there many invertebrates including the rare Desmoulin's whorl snail.

The site is popular with ramblers, dog walkers and birdwatchers. There is also a bridleway which passes alongside the site and the nearby Eaton Common Local Nature Reserve, before crossing the Norwich-London train line and joining Marston Lane.

== Norwich Apex Data Centre concerns ==
In 2026, plans were submitted to South Norfolk District Council by Norwich Apex Data Centre to construct a 150 megawatt data centre in a 32 acre parcel of land between Marston Marshes and Ipswich Road.

The proposals have attracted widespread opposition and controversy amongst residents and visitors, who have shared concerns about the impact of the development on the nearby marshes, alongside general criticisms of data centre noise levels, energy demands and water usage. In October 2026, around 100 protestors gathered outside of the council's headquarters and an online petition has attracted over 20,000 signatures opposing the plans.

In response to the controversy, developers have claimed that the facility will not cause undue disturbance to the nearby Nature Reserve and that around 150 jobs will be created by the project.

The leader of South Norfolk Council, Daniel Elmer, said he would formally object to the plans, describing the building as "just too damned big for the site". Conversely, Harvey Washington, a local business owner, publicly backed the scheme, citing the expected business rates and skilled jobs, while calling for planning conditions on noise and local apprenticeships.
