= Haven Bridge =

Bridge in Great Yarmouth, England

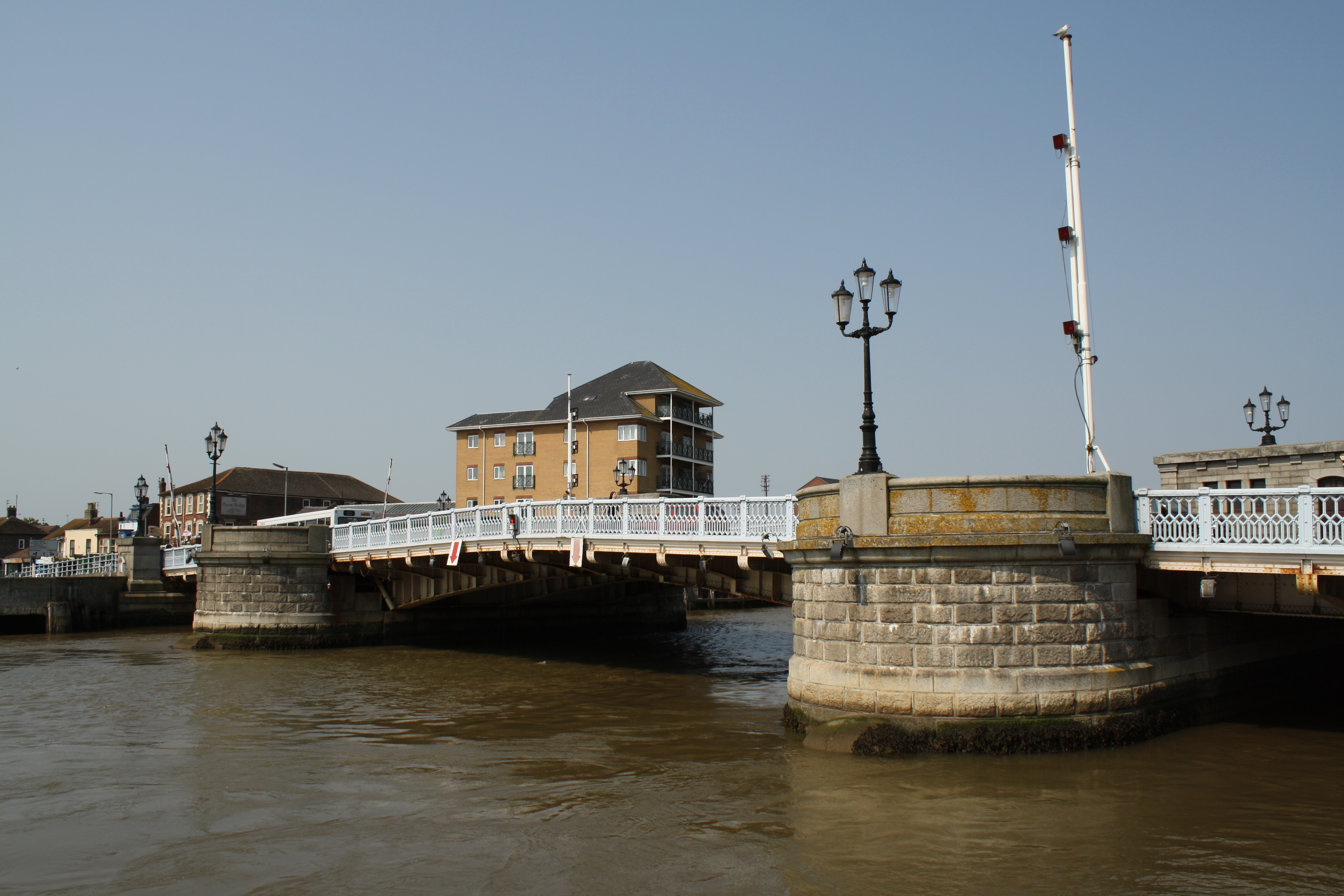
- Haven Bridge in 2011
- Coordinates: 52.60674°N 1.72277°E
- OS grid reference: TG 5216 0750
- Crosses: River Yare
- Owner: Norfolk County Council
- Maintained by: Peel Ports

History
- Opened: 1930
- Rebuilt: 2023

Location
- Interactive map of Haven Bridge

Haven Bridge is a bascule bridge over the River Yare in Great Yarmouth, Norfolk, England. Constructed from cast iron and supported by stone bascules with cast iron railings, It is owned by Norfolk County Council and operated by Peel Ports. The Ice House is located nearby.

== History ==
There has been a bridge on the site of Haven Bridge since at least 1427, and the current Haven Bridge replaced an earlier bridge of the same name that was opened to the public on 21 October 1854. Cheesewring granite was used for its construction, after which Haven Bridge was opened by the Prince of Wales on 21 October 1930. It received heavy protection during World War II as a point of high strategic value. Initially lit with 1kW tungsten general-lighting-service lamps, these were replaced in 1970 by triple clustered Phosco lanterns with 150W high pressure sodium lamps.

In 2019, the bridge was subject to a catastrophic failure; £2 million was spent to rebuild it, and this was completed in December 2023. A row between Peel Ports and the council led to the bridge only being opened twice daily. However, on 9 April 2024 the bridge was shut completely by Peel Ports due to a "health and safety concern", with no further details given. It was later revealed that the closure was due to an incident in which some members of the public, who were thought to be intoxicated, tried to direct traffic and jumped over the bridge's safety barriers to see if they could still cross; Peel Ports thus ignored its statutory duty to open the bridge to pressure the council to address its health and safety concerns. A local boatyard said in May that the lost trade had cost them £2 million due to the issues. In June 2024 BBC News reported that the bridge had not been lifted for river traffic since April that year. The bridge reopened in July 2024 due to a temporary agreement in which the council would contribute towards the cost of its operation.
