= Marston Marsh =

Local Nature Reserve in Norwich, England

Coordinates: 52.60291°N 1.26905°E

Marston Marsh is a Local Nature Reserve in southwest Norwich, Norfolk, England.
