= Sweetbriar Road Meadows, Norwich =

UK Site of Special Scientific Interest

Coordinates: 52.6407°N 1.2628°E

- Site of Special Scientific Interest
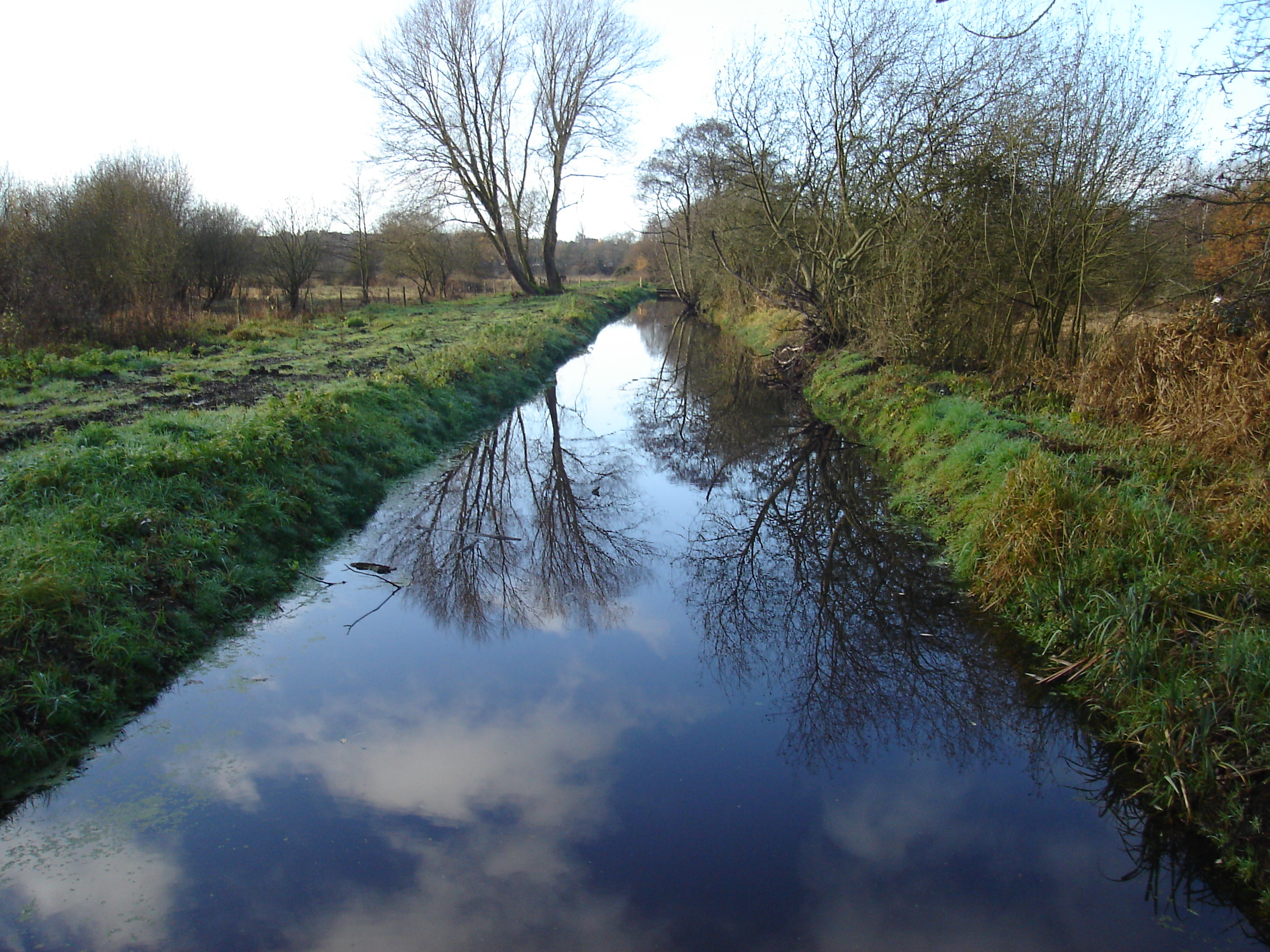
- A water-filled dyke bisects the meadow
- Location of Sweetbriar Road Meadows, Norwich.
- Area of search: Norfolk
- Grid reference: TG208097
- Interest: Biological
- Area: 9.7 hectares (24 acres)
- Notification date: 1986
- Location map: Magic Map

Sweetbriar Road Meadows is a 9.7-hectare (24-acre) biological Site of Special Scientific Interest in Norwich in Norfolk, England.

== Description ==
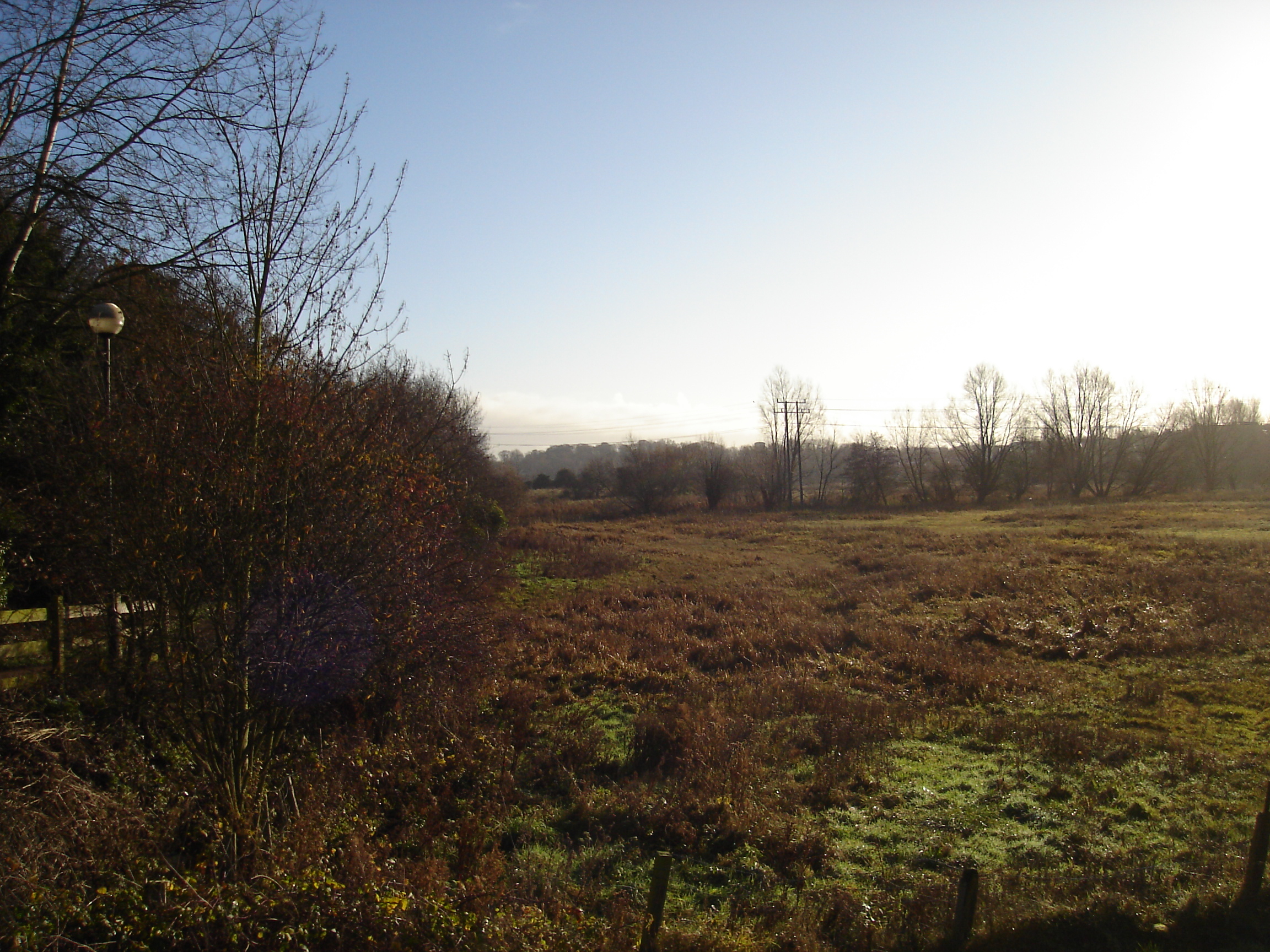
The meadows viewed from close to the riverside path

Enclosed between Norwich's outer ring road, industrial land and lying in the floodplain of the River Wensum, the site acts as a 'green wedge' extending towards the city. The site consists of a series of unimproved wet meadows with permanent water-logging which support many plant species. Three principal grassland communities are present; damp neutral grassland, marshy grassland and areas of tall fen. A number of water-filled dykes bisect the site and attract large numbers of breeding amphibians in the spring months. Large flocks of redpoll and occasionally siskin feed on the alder trees that fringe the meadows. Many other bird species including snipe find the wet fields an ideal breeding habitat. The whole site is managed on traditional lines with light pony grazing without the use of artificial fertilizers and herbicides.

In January 2022 Sweetbriar Road Meadows and the adjacent marshes making up the Sweet Briar Marshes was purchased by the Esmée Fairbairn Foundation on behalf of the Norfolk Wildlife Trust.

The Norfolk Wildlife Trust launched an appeal to raise the money to purchase Sweet Briar Marshes from the Esmée Fairbairn Foundation.

== Location ==
Its western boundary is formed by the A140 outer ring road Sweet Briar Road. Marriott's Way NCR1 lies to the north and the Riverside Walk to the south. Mile Cross Marsh together with the adjacent Sycamore Crescent Wood are known collectively as the Wensum Local Nature Reserve and form the eastern boundary. The site is private land with no public access but can be viewed from public footpaths.
