= Wiveton Downs =

Site of Special Scientific Interest in Norfolk, England

- Site of Special Scientific Interest
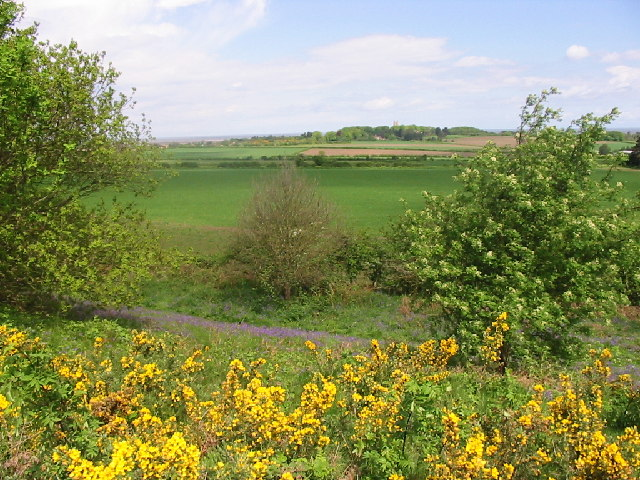
- Location of Wiveton Downs.
- Area of search: Norfolk
- Grid reference: TG 025 428
- Coordinates: 52.944°N 1.012°E
- Interest: Biological; Geological
- Area: 28.9 hectares (71 acres)
- Notification date: 1992
- Location map: Magic Map

Wiveton Downs is a 28.9-hectare (71-acre) biological and geological Site of Special Scientific Interest at Wiveton, west of Sheringham in the English county of Norfolk. Part of it is a Geological Conservation Review site, and an area of 6.5-hectare (16-acre) is a Local Nature Reserve. It is in the Norfolk Coast Area of Outstanding Natural Beauty.

The site is a classic example of an esker, a glacial crevasse which has been filled in until it forms a narrow winding ridge. It is considered very important for teaching, research and demonstration.
