= Earlham Park Woods =

Nature reserve in Norfolk, United Kingdom

Coordinates: 52.623°N 1.231°E

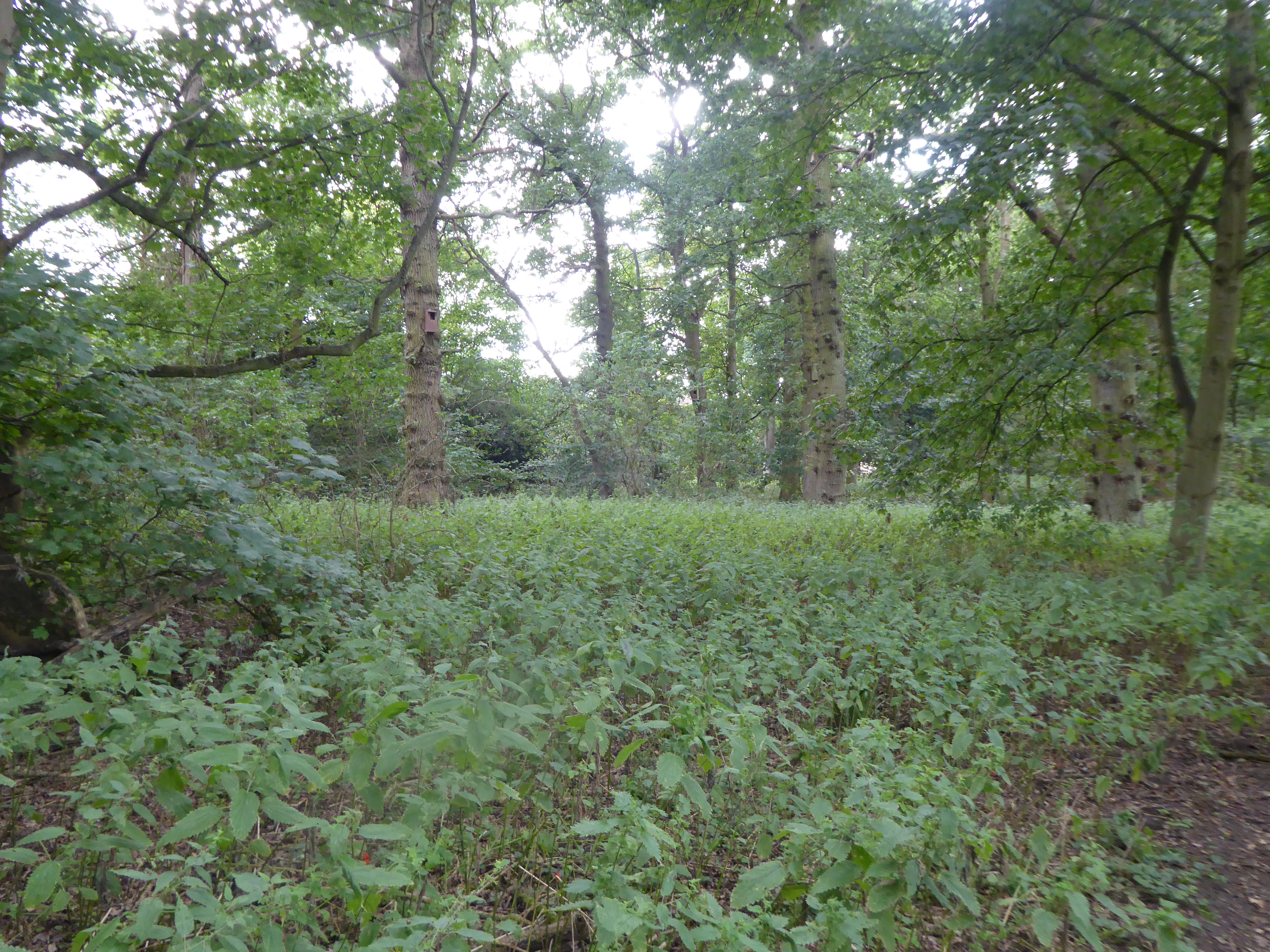
- Interactive map of Earlham Park Woods
- Type: Local Nature Reserve
- Location: Norwich, Norfolk
- OS grid: TG 188 077
- Area: 8.1 hectares (20 acres)
- Manager: Norwich City Council

Earlham Park Woods is a 8.1-hectare (20-acre) Local Nature Reserve on the western outskirts of Norwich in Norfolk. It is owned and managed by Norwich City Council.

This is an area of woodland fringing Earlham Park, and trees include regenerating elms. Other habitats include tall marsh, unimproved grassland and a pond which has silted up.

There is access from Earlham Road and University Drive.
