= Danby Wood =

Nature reserve in Norfolk, England

Coordinates: 52.603°N 1.275°E

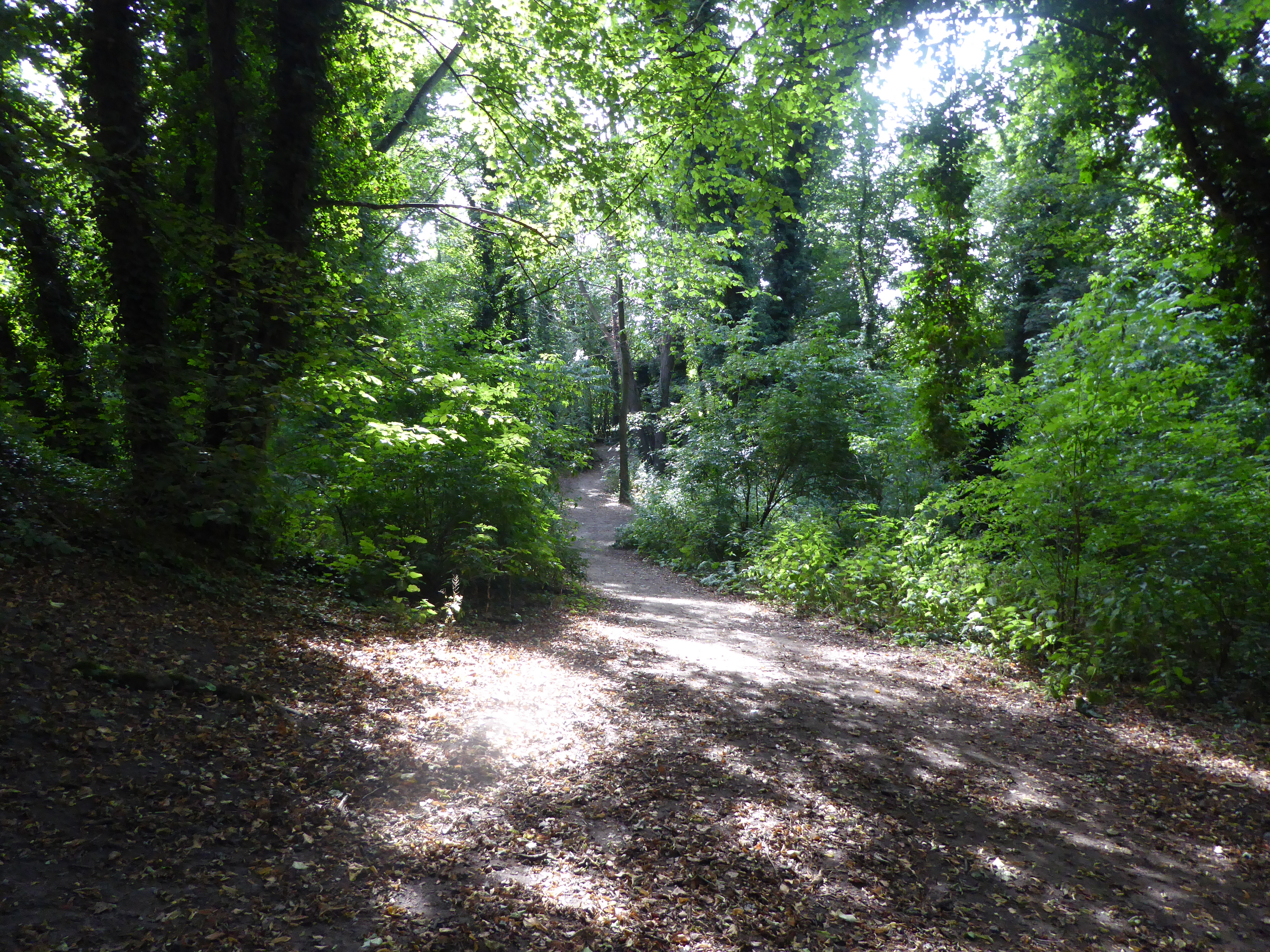
- Interactive map of Danby Wood
- Type: Local Nature Reserve
- Location: Norwich, Norfolk
- OS grid: TG 219 056
- Area: 3.9 hectares (9.6 acres)
- Manager: Norwich City Council

Danby Wood is a 3.9-hectare (9.6-acre) Local Nature Reserve on the southern outskirts of Norwich in Norfolk. It is owned and managed by Norwich City Council.

This semi-natural wood on a former chalk mine has many hills, hollows and banks. Broadleaved trees include oaks, limes, sycamores and two walnuts.

There is access from Marston Lane
