= Barnham Cross Common =

UK Site of Special Scientific Interest

Coordinates: 52.398°N 0.740°E

- Site of Special Scientific Interest
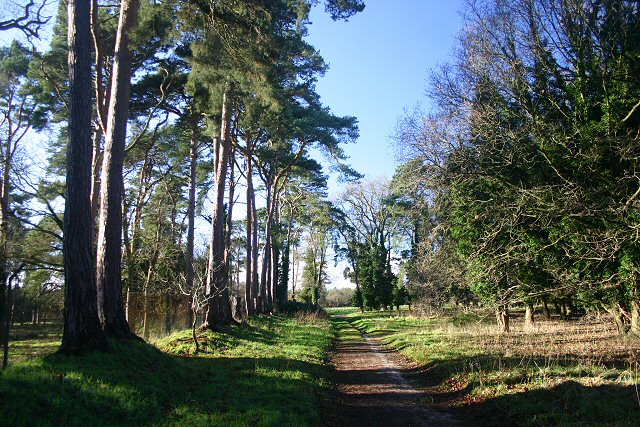
- Location of Barnham Cross Common.
- Area of search: Norfolk, England
- Grid reference: TL 865 813
- Interest: Biological
- Area: 69.1 hectares (171 acres)
- Notification date: 1986
- Location map: Magic Map

Barnham Cross Common is a 69.1-hectare (171-acre) biological Site of Special Scientific Interest on the southern outskirts of Thetford in Norfolk, England. It is owned by Thetford Town Council and is registered common land. It is also a Local Nature Reserve and a Nature Conservation Review site, Grade 1. It is part of the Breckland Special Area of Conservation and Special Protection Area.

This grassland and heath common has diverse habitats and a rich flora, including several nationally rare plants. There are nearly a hundred species of birds, including sixty which breed on the site, and a wide range of invertebrates.

The common is open to the public. Part of the land designated as Barnham Cross Common SSSI is owned by the Ministry of Defence.
