= Eaton Common =

Nature reserve in Norwich, United Kingdom

Coordinates: 52.598°N 1.259°E

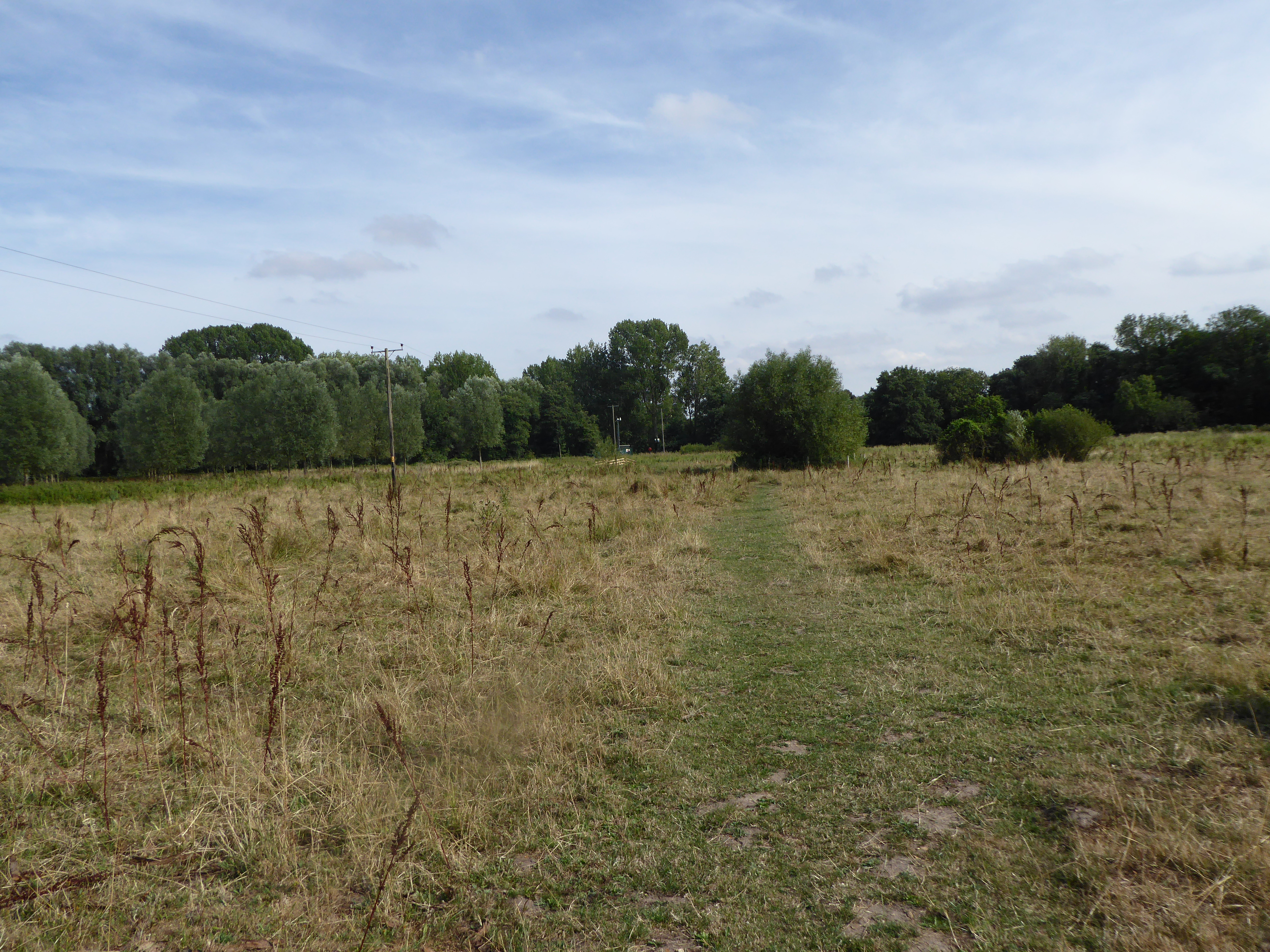
- Interactive map of Eaton Common
- Type: Local Nature Reserve
- Location: Norwich, Norfolk, England
- OS grid: TG 208 050
- Area: 5.3 hectares (13 acres)

Eaton Common is a 5.3-hectare (13-acre) Local Nature Reserve on the southern outskirts of Norwich in the county of Norfolk in England, United Kingdom. It is owned and managed by Norwich City Council.

This site on the bank of the River Yare is mainly grassland, some of which is marshy. There are also small areas of broadleaved woodland and tall herbs.

There is access from Church Lane.
