= South Walsham Fen =

Nature reserve in Norfolk, England

Coordinates: 52.661°N 1.474°E

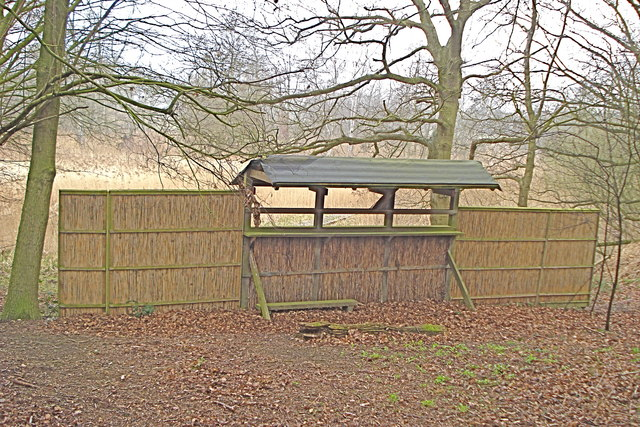
- Interactive map of South Walsham Fen
- Type: Local Nature Reserve
- Location: South Walsham, Norfolk
- OS grid: TG 350 127
- Area: 1.4 hectares (3.5 acres)
- Manager: Norfolk County Council

South Walsham Fen is a 1.4-hectare (3.5-acre) Local Nature Reserve west of South Walsham in Norfolk. It is owned and managed by Norfolk County Council.

This nature reserve has semi-improved grassland and species-rich hedges which mark an ancient track. There are also areas of bracken and ancient woodland.

There is public access to the site.
