= Wensum Local Nature Reserve =

Local Nature Reserve in Norwich, England

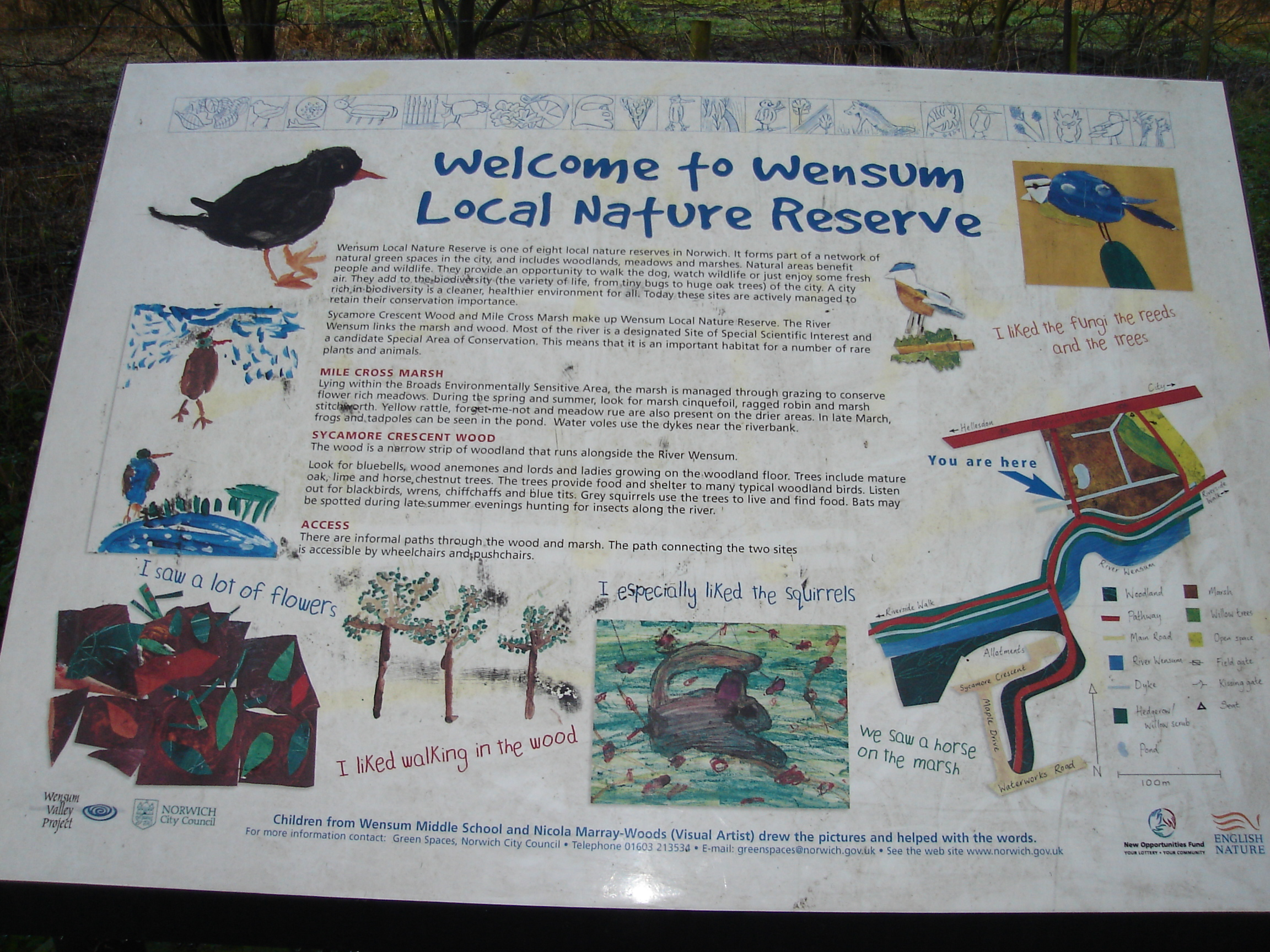
Interpretation board at Mile Cross Marsh

Wensum Local Nature Reserve or Wensum Valley is a Local Nature Reserve in Norwich in the English county of Norfolk. The reserve consists of two sites; Mile Cross Marsh 52.6419°N 1.2657°E and Sycamore Crescent Wood which are linked by the Riverside Path a public footpath via the Sycamore Crescent footbridge

== Location ==
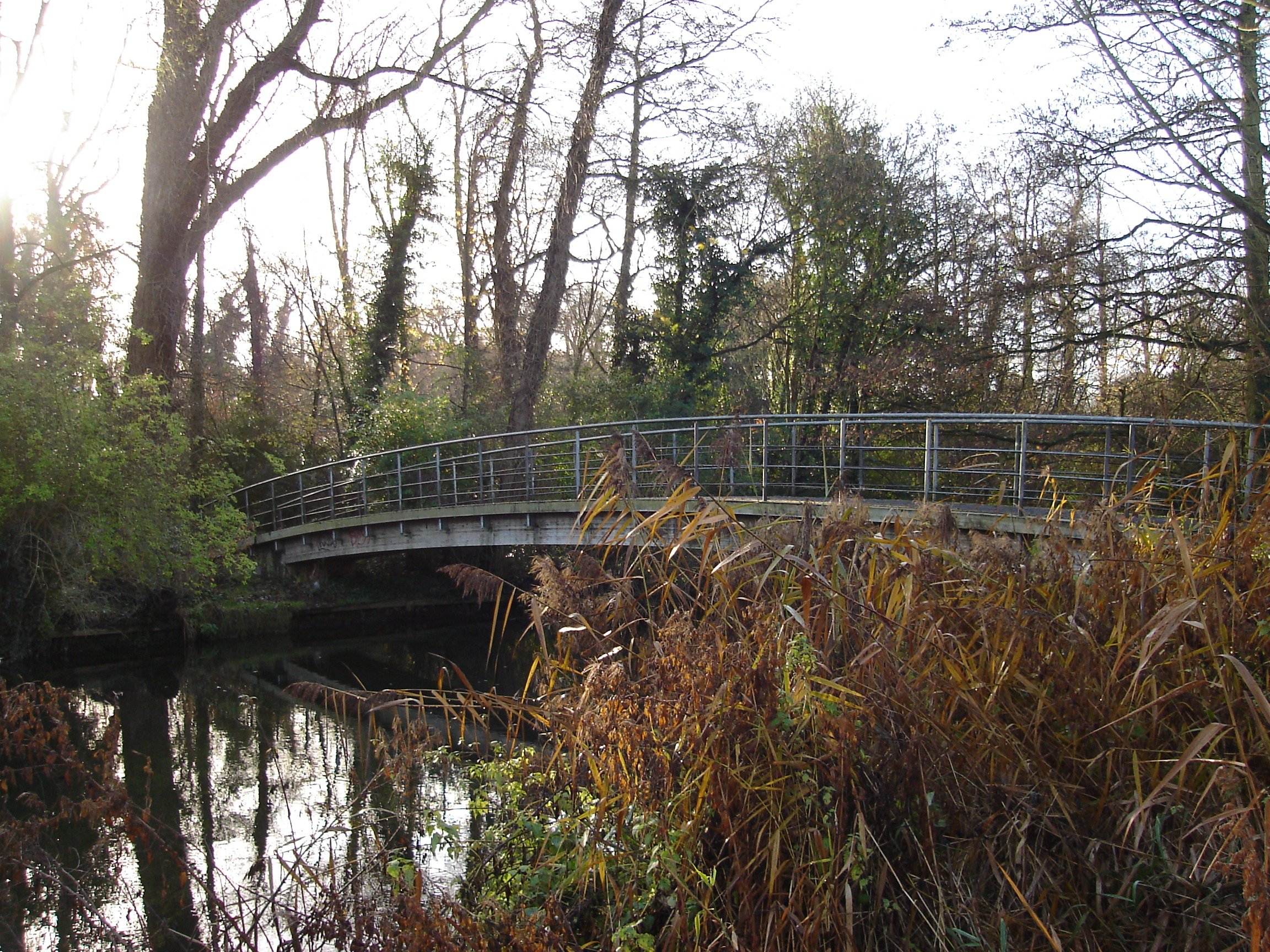
A view across Sycamore Crescent footbridge with Sycamore Crescent wood in the background

- Sycamore Crescent Wood

Waterworks Road forms the site's southern boundary. A housing estate lies to the east with the Norwich waterworks on its western edge. The wood is bounded by the River Wensum to the north.

== Description ==
The wood is located on a north facing slope adjoining the River Wensum. Wildflowers recorded in the reserve include bluebell, wood anemone, lily of the valley, red campion, winter aconite, snowdrop and crocus. The narrow strip of woodland supports many mature trees including beech, horse chestnut, lime and a small stand of elm close to the Waterworks Road entrance. Contained within the reserve is approximately 400 metres (1,300 ft) of tree-lined riverside frontage.

== Location ==
- Mile Cross Marsh

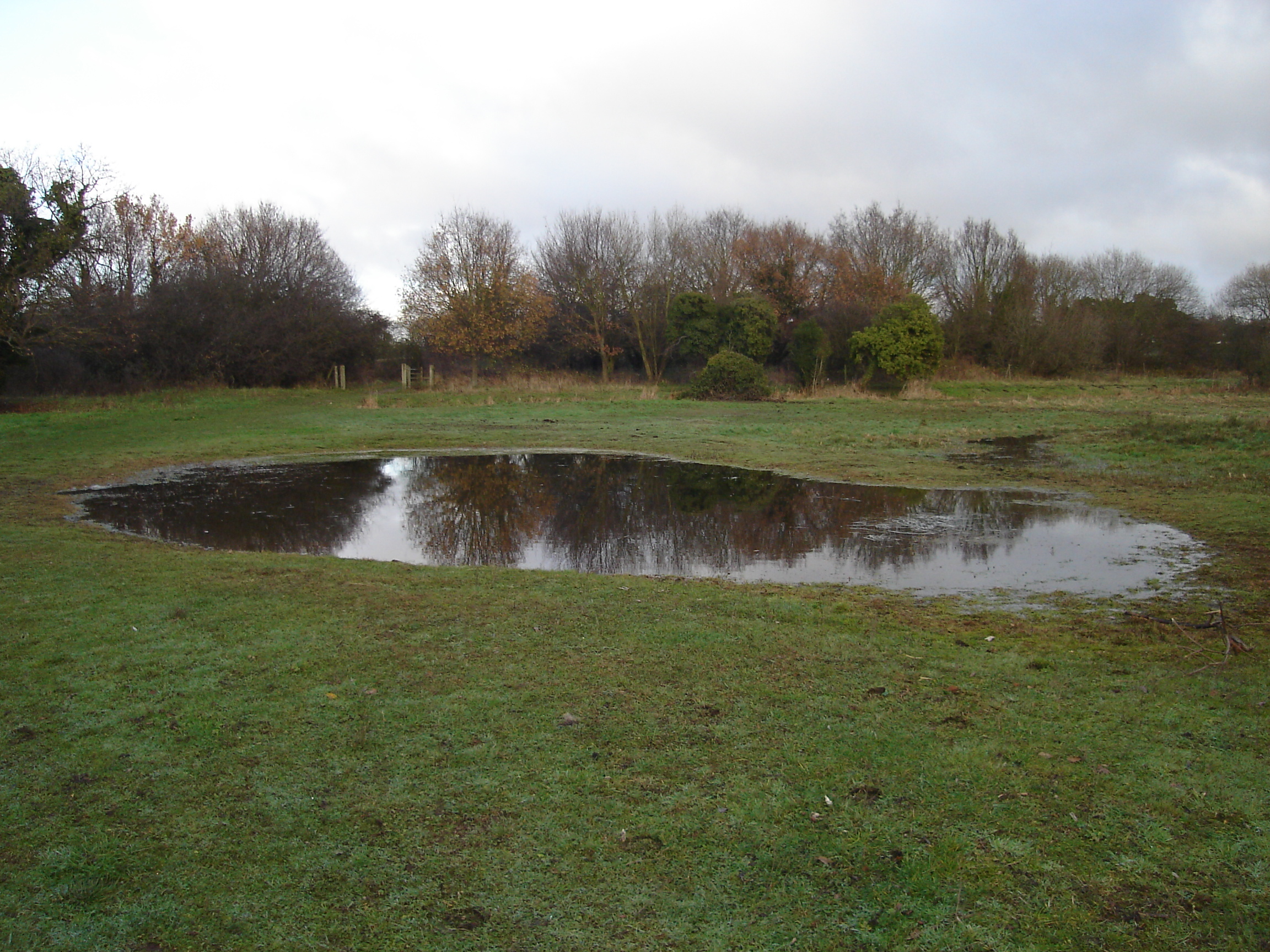
Small man-made pond at Mile Cross Marsh

The marsh is bounded by two public footpaths: The Riverside Walk to the south and the Marriott's Way NCR1 on its northern boundary. Sweetbriar Road Meadows SSSI adjoin the marsh on the west and mostly industrial land lie to the east.

== Description ==
The marsh consists of an area of fen and damp grassland. A small man-made pond in the reserve is used by breeding amphibians and provides a hunting ground for damselflies and is home to several species of dragonfly. During spells of prolonged drought the pond is prone to dry out. In the spring of 2012, the pond was filled in to stop the spread of the invasive New Zealand pigmy weed to the adjoining SSSI. Wildflowers including meadowsweet, marsh marigold, and purple loosestrife have been recorded.
