= Bowthorpe Marsh =

Nature reserve in Norfolk, United Kingdom

Coordinates: 52.630°N 1.221°E

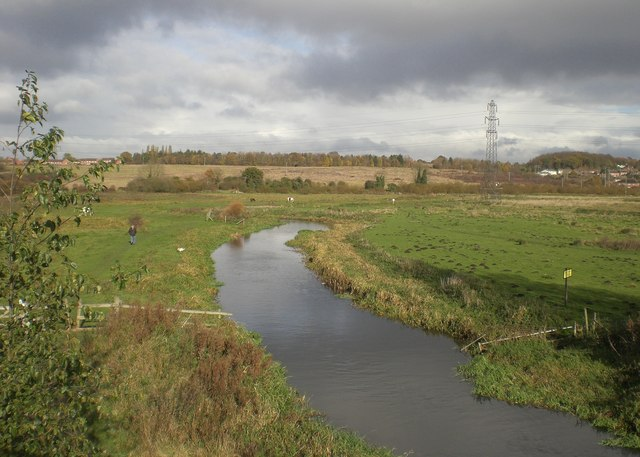
- Interactive map of Bowthorpe Marsh
- Type: Local Nature Reserve
- Location: Norwich, Norfolk
- OS grid: TG 181 085
- Area: 5.9 hectares (15 acres)
- Manager: Norwich City Council

Bowthorpe Marsh is a 5.9-hectare (15-acre) Local Nature Reserve in Norwich, Norfolk, England. It is owned and managed by Norwich City Council.

This site adjacent to the River Yare has unimproved grassland, tall fen, a seasonal pond and drainage ditches, which have aquatic plants such as reed sweet-grass.
