= Lion Wood =

Protected area in Norwich, Norfolk, England

Coordinates: 52.629°N 1.320°E

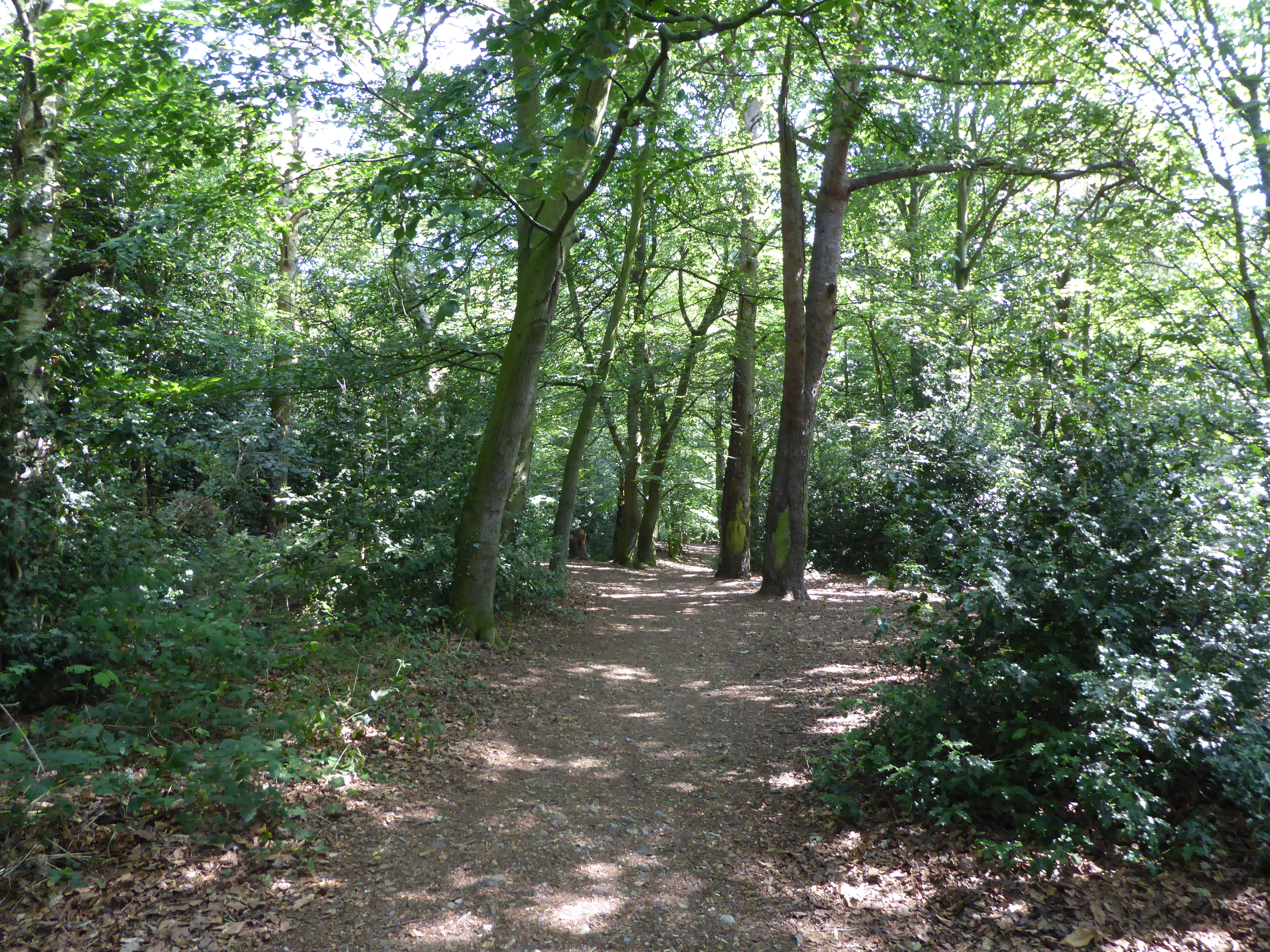
- Interactive map of Lion Wood
- Type: Local Nature Reserve
- Location: Norwich, Norfolk
- OS grid: TG 248 087
- Area: 8.9 hectares (22 acres)
- Manager: Norwich City Council

Lion Wood is a 8.9-hectare (22-acre) Local Nature Reserve in Norwich in Norfolk. It is owned and managed by Norwich City Council.

Around a third of this wood is believed to be ancient. The dominant trees are oak and sycamore, and there is a variety of woodland birds such as blackcaps and green and greater spotted woodpeckers.

The wood is open to the public.
