= List of local nature reserves in Cambridgeshire =

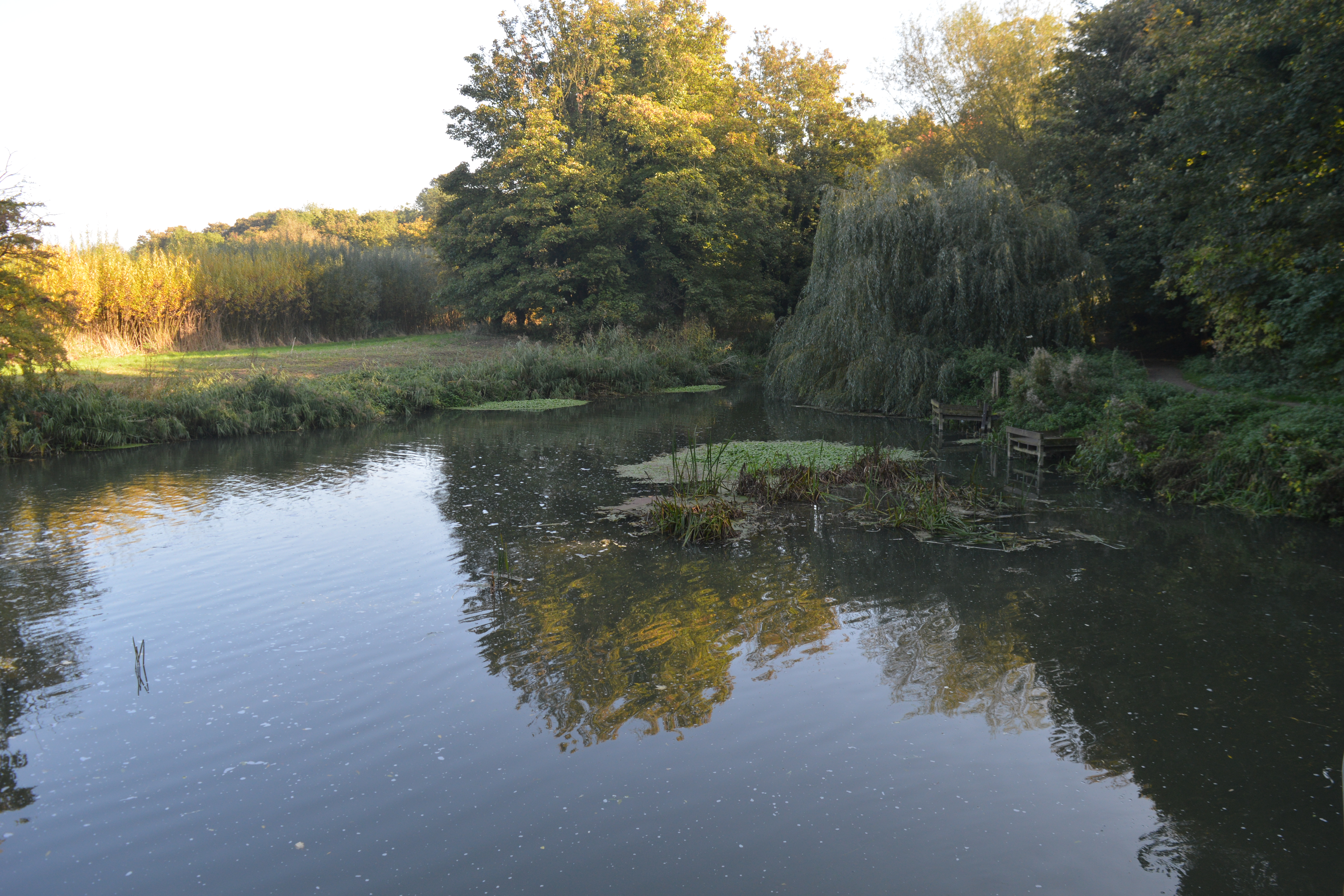
Byron's Pool

Cambridgeshire is a county in eastern England, with an area of 1,308 square miles (3,390 km^{2}) and a population as of 2011 of 708,719. It is crossed by two major rivers, the Nene and the Great Ouse. The main manufacturing area is Peterborough, and the foundation of the University of Cambridge in the thirteenth century made the county one of the country's most important intellectual centres. A large part of the county is in The Fens, and drainage of this habitat, which was probably commenced in the Roman period and largely completed by the seventeenth century, considerably increased the area available for agriculture.

The administrative county was formed in 1974, incorporating most of the historic county of Huntingdonshire. Local government is divided between Cambridgeshire County Council and Peterborough City Council, which is a separate unitary authority. Under the county council, there are five district councils, Cambridge City Council, South Cambridgeshire District Council, East Cambridgeshire District Council, Huntingdonshire District Council and Fenland District Council.

Local nature reserves (LNRs) are designated by local authorities, which must have legal control over the site, by owning it, leasing it or having an agreement with the owner. LNRs are sites which have a special local interest biologically, geologically or for education. Local authorities can either manage sites themselves or through other groups such as "friends of" and wildlife trusts, and can apply local bye-laws to manage and protect LNRs.

There are twenty-seven LNRs in Cambridgeshire. Four are Sites of Special Scientific Interest, and five are managed by the Wildlife Trust for Bedfordshire, Cambridgeshire and Northamptonshire. The largest is Little Paxton Pits at sixty hectares, which is of national importance for wintering wildfowl, and the smallest is St Denis Churchyard, East Hatley, which has grassland with diverse flowers. There is public access to all sites.

== Key ==
=== Other classifications ===
- SSSI = Site of Special Scientific Interest
- WTBCN = Wildlife Trust for Bedfordshire, Cambridgeshire and Northamptonshire

== Sites ==
Site	Photograph	Area (Note: Unless otherwise stated, the area is taken from the Natural England map of each site. (Click on the identify icon (i) in the "Feature Tools" and then click on the site.))	Location (Note: The location is taken from the Natural England details page for the site.)	District	Other classifications	Map (Note: The maps are on the Natural England database of Local Nature Reserves.)	Details (Note: Details are on the pages on each site in the Natural England database of Local Nature Reserves.)	Description
Barnwell East	Barnwell East	2.6 hectares (6.4 acres)	Cambridge; 52.203°N 0.161°E; TL 478 583	Cambridge		Map	Details	The site has woodland, a pond, scrub and grassland. Flora include blackthorns, hawthorns and bee orchids, there are birds such as blackcaps and willow warblers, and common blue and meadow brown butterflies.
Barnwell West	Barnwell II West	3.8 hectares (9.4 acres)	Cambridge; 52.204°N 0.161°E; TL 478 584	Cambridge		Map	Details	This is a linear site along Coldhams Brook, which is managed to encourage water voles. There are birds such as kingfishers, redwings and fieldfares, and butterflies include speckled woods and orange tips.
Beechwoods	The Beechwoods	9.8 hectares (24 acres)	Cambridge; 52.167°N 0.170°E; TL 485 545	Cambridge	WTBCN	Map	Details	Beeches were planted on chalky farmland in the 1840s, and medieval plough terraces are still visible. Birds include green and great spotted woodpeckers, and nuthatches.
The Boardwalks	The Boardwalks	7.8 hectares (19 acres)	Peterborough; 52.569°N 0.260°W; TL 180 982	Peterborough		Map	Details	The site runs along the north bank of the River Nene. It has ponds with water beetles, frogs, toads and smooth newts. Bats nest in large willows, and birds include herons and woodpeckers.
Bramblefields	Bramblefields	2.1 hectares (5.2 acres)	Cambridge; 52.224°N 0.154°E; TL 472 606	Cambridge		Map	Details	This site in the middle of a residential area has grassland, scrub and a pond with vertebrates (amphibians) such as frogs and newts. Birds include song thrushes.
Byron's Pool	Byron's Pool	4.4 hectares (11 acres)	Grantchester; 52.1714°N 0.1000°E; TL 461 542	Cambridge		Map	Details	The site is named after Lord Byron, who used to swim in the pool. It is a linear pond and woodland next to the River Cam. Birds include little grebes and grey wagtails, and there are frogs, butterflies, damselflies and dragonflies.
Coldham's Common	Coldham's Common	49.3 hectares (122 acres)	Cambridge; 52.206°N 0.153°E; TL 472 586	Cambridge		Map	Details	This site has areas of unimproved grassland, with anthills of yellow meadow ants. There is also scrub and woodland. Flora includes spiny rest harrow, upright brome and bee orchid.
Dogsthorpe Star Pit	Dogsthorpe Star Pit	36.7 hectares (91 acres)	Peterborough; 52.608°N 0.210°W; TF 213 026	Peterborough	SSSI, WTBCN	Map	Details	This former brick pit has been designated an SSSI mainly for its invertebrates, especially its water beetles, with 64 species, including 4 on the IUCN Red List of Threatened Species, Graptodytes bilineatus, Dryops similaris, Gyrinus distinctus and Myopites inulaedyssentericae.
Eye Green	Eye Green	12.0 hectares (30 acres)	Eye Green; 52.614°N 0.185°W; TF 230 034	Peterborough		Map	Details	This site was formerly brick workings, and a large area is now filled by a lake. Reeds and scrub line much of the shore, providing cover for water birds such coots and moorhens, while dunnocks and great tits nest in dense scrub. There is grassland with many flowers, and diverse invertebrate species.
Grimeshaw Wood	Grimeshaw Wood	16.8 hectares (42 acres)	Peterborough; 52.594°N 0.289°W; TF 160 010	Peterborough		Map	Details	This site is ancient woodland in three adjacent areas. Flora include nettle-leaved bellflowers, and there are resident pipistrelle bats.
Isleham	Isleham Nature Reserve	1.1 hectares (2.7 acres)	Isleham; 52.328°N 0.402°E; TL 637 726	East Cambridgeshire		Map	Details	This is a stretch of a former railway line. It is grassland and hedgerows with a wide variety of fauna and flora. There are flowering plants such as field scabious, greater knapweed, St John's wort, wild marjoram and bladder campion.
Kingston and Bourn Old Railway	Kingston and Bourn Old Railway	1.9 hectares (4.7 acres)	Toft; 52.185°N 0.043°W; TL 339 559	South Cambridgeshire		Map	Details	The sides of this old railway bank are woodland, with ash, field maple and oak the main trees, while the top of the bank is unimproved grassland. There is also an area of wetland with mature pollarded willows.
Lattersey Field	Lattersey Field	11.9 hectares (29 acres)	Whittlesey; 52.552°N 0.111°W; TL 282 966	Fenland	WTBCN	Map	Details	This former clay brick quarry has pits which have filled with water, and it has diverse habitats of grassland, woodland, scrub, pools, marshes and reedbeds. Mammals includes water voles, water shrews, and there are birds such as sedge warblers, tawny owls, woodcocks, great spotted woodpeckers and reed buntings.
Limekiln Close and East Pit	East Pit	11.0 hectares (27 acres)	Cherry Hinton; 52.182°N 0.171°E; TL 485 560	Cambridge	SSSI, WTBCN	N/Av (Note: Three adjacent chalk pits in Cherry Hinton are nature reserves; East Pit and West Pit are separated by Limekiln Road, and the third pit called Limekiln Close is north of East Pit. Cambridge City Council have designated Limekiln Close and East Pit as one LNR, and West Pit as another one. However, the LNRs are confused on the Natural England website. One LNR is shown as Limekiln Close and West Pit on the details page, but the map only covers Limekiln Close. The other LNR is shown on the details page as East Pit, whereas the map covers both East and West Pits. To add to the confusion, East and West Pits are designated an SSSI called Cherry Hinton Pit, and Limekiln Close and East Pit are managed by the Wildlife Trust for Bedfordshire, Cambridgeshire and Northamptonshire as a nature reserve called Cherry Hinton Chalk Pits.)	N/Av	The two parts of the site are both former chalk quarries. East Pit is surrounded by steep walls of chalk, and the base is wildflower grassland with areas of scrub. Flowers include millkwort, harebell, kidney vetch and the rare moon carrot, which is on the British Red List of Threatened Species. Quarrying ceased 200 years ago in Limekiln Close, and it is now steeply sloping mature woodland with ash and cherry trees.
Little Downham	Little Downham	6.6 hectares (16 acres)	Little Downham; 52.427°N 0.234°E; TL 524 834	East Cambridgeshire		Map	Details	The site consists of three areas of land, Pingle Wood, Myles Meadow and The Holts. Myles Meadow has two ponds and is seasonally grazed by cattle. Holts Meadow has a pond with many dragonflies and damselflies, including the emperor and scarce chaser dragonflies.
Little Paxton Pits	Little Paxton Pits	60.0 hectares (148 acres)	Little Paxton; 52.258°N 0.243°W; TL 200 637	Huntingdonshire	SSSI	Map	Details	These flooded former gravel pits are of national importance for wintering wildfowl, especially gadwalls. There are several nationally rare flies, such as Spilogona scutulata and Lispocephala falculata. Flora include common spotted-orchids and hare's-foot clover.
Logan's Meadow	Logan's Meadow	1.1 hectares (2.7 acres)	Cambridge; 52.212°N 0.141°E; TL 463 592	Cambridge		Map	Details	This site of the bank of the River Cam has pasture with tortoiseshell and comma butterflies, and flowers such as cow parsley and cuckoo flowers. Starling roost in trees in the autumn, and there are freshwater mussels in the river.
Mare Fen	Mare Fen	16.3 hectares (40 acres)	Swavesey; 52.309°N 0.002°E; TL 366 698	South Cambridgeshire		Map	Details	This pasture in the floodplain of the River Great Ouse is used for grazing in the summer and allowed to flood in the winter. It has wildfowl such as mute swans, wigeons, teal and shovelers, mammals include badgers and muntjac deer. There are diverse aquatic plants.
Melwood	Melwood	0.6 hectares (1.5 acres)	Meldreth; 52.095°N 0.011°E; TL 378 459	South Cambridgeshire		Map	Details	This is a woodland site next to the River Mel, with trees such as ash, hawthorn, sycamore, beech and silver birch. Ground flora include dog violet and cow parsley, while traveller's joy provides food for moths. Tawny owls and pipistrelle bats roost on ivy.
Nine Wells	Nine Wells	1.2 hectares (3.0 acres)	Great Shelford; 52.167°N 0.135°E; TL 461 542	Cambridge		Map	Details	The springs in this beech wood feed Hobson's Conduit, which formerly supplied clean drinking water to Cambridge. It was previously an SSSI for its rare invertebrates, but these were lost during the drought of 1976 and it forfeited its SSSI status. 108 species of flora have been recorded.
Paradise	Paradise	2.2 hectares (5.4 acres)	Cambridge; 52.194°N 0.114°E; TL 446 572	Cambridge		Map	Details	This site on the west bank of the River Cam has marshland and wet woodland with mature willows. Flora include butterbur, and the reserve has the uncommon musk beetle, which lays its eggs in the willows.
Ring's End	Ring's End	8.5 hectares (21 acres)	March; 52.595°N 0.069°E; TF 402 017	Fenland		Map	Details	This is a linear site along a disused railway embankment, with views over The Fens. There are also three ponds, reedbeds and areas of scrub. The soil is poor in nutrients, which has allowed uncommon flowering plants such as coltsfoot to become established.
Sheep's Green and Coe Fen	Coe Fen	16.9 hectares (42 acres)	Cambridge; 52.197°N 0.116°E; TL 447 575	Cambridge		Map	Details	These seasonally flooded grazing grounds on the banks of the River Cam have waterfowl such as egrets, kingfishers and herons, and water voles are increasing in numbers. There are a number of mature willow trees.
Somersham	Somersham	8.9 hectares (22 acres)	Somersham; 52.384°N 0.006°E; TL 366 781	Huntingdonshire		Map	Details	Habitats in this reserve are a lake, wetland, grassland and woodland. Vertebrates include reptiles such as grass snakes and common lizards, there are birds such as great crested grebes, and flora such as red bartsia and purple loosestrife.
St Denis Church (footprint of church only)	St Denis Church, East Hatley	0.02 hectares (0.05 acres)	Hatley; 52.138°N 0.124°W; TL 285 505	South Cambridgeshire		Map	Details	The churchyard is mainly neutral grassland, but some is calcareous, and its grasses and flowers are diverse. Flowers include hoary plantain, rough hawkbit and oxlip.
West Pit	West Pit	4.3 hectares (11 acres)	Cherry Hinton; 52.182°N 0.169°E; TL 483 559	Cambridge	SSSI	N/Av	N/Av	This former chalk quarry is now steeply sloping woodland with a caravan park in the centre. The woodland has been designated an SSSI due to the presence of a plant on the British Red List of Threatened Species, the moon carrot.
Woodston Ponds	Woodston Ponds	8.9 hectares (22 acres)	Peterborough; 52.568°N 0.264°W; TL 177 980	Peterborough	WTBCN	Map	Details	The site was formerly settling ponds to remove washings from sugar beet. The east side has a lake with water birds such as grey herons, tufted ducks and pochards. In the west there is a reedbed which has pools and channels, with great crested newts and unusual species of water beetle.

== See also ==
- List of Sites of Special Scientific Interest in Cambridgeshire
