= National nature reserves in Cambridgeshire =

National nature reserves in Cambridgeshire, England are established by Natural England and managed by them or by non-governmental organisations such as the Royal Society for the Protection of Birds or the National Trust.

== List of reserves ==
A list of national nature reserves in Cambridge:

- Barnack Hills & Holes NNR, 22 hectares (54 acres) near Stamford
- Bedford Purlieus NNR, 208 hectares (510 acres) near Kings Cliffe
- Castor Hanglands NNR, 90 hectares (220 acres) near Peterborough
- Chippenham Fen NNR, 117 hectares (290 acres) near Newmarket
- Holme Fen NNR, 266 hectares (660 acres) near Ramsey
- Monks Wood NNR, 157 hectares (390 acres) near Sawtry
- Upwood Meadows NNR, 6 hectares (15 acres) near Ramsey
- Wicken Fen NNR, 255 hectares (630 acres) near Soham
- Woodwalton Fen NNR, 208 hectares (510 acres) near Ramsey

== See also ==
- List of Sites of Special Scientific Interest in Cambridgeshire
- List of Local Nature Reserves in Cambridgeshire
