= Barnwell West =

Nature reserve in Cambridge, UK

Coordinates: 52.204°N 0.161°E

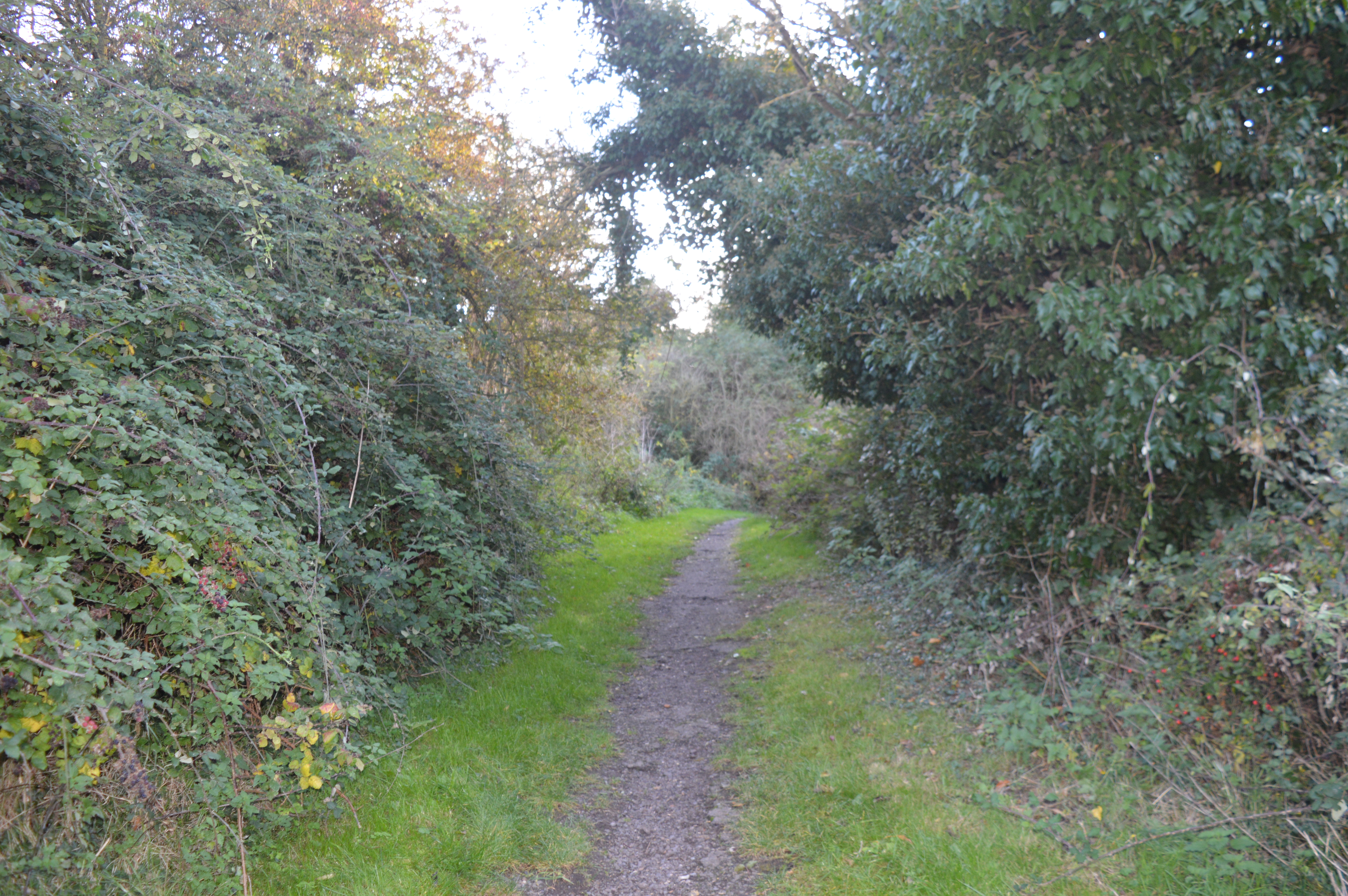
- Interactive map of Barnwell West
- Type: Local Nature Reserve
- Location: Cambridge, Cambridgeshire
- OS grid: TL 478 584
- Area: 3.8 hectares (9.4 acres)
- Manager: Cambridge City Council

Barnwell West is a 3.8 hectare Local Nature Reserve in Cambridge. It is managed by Cambridge City Council.

This is a linear site along Coldhams Brook, which is managed to encourage water voles. There are birds such as kingfishers, redwings and fieldfares, and butterflies include speckled woods and orange tips.

There is access from Barnwell Road and Coldham's Common.

== See also ==
- Barnwell East
