= Somersham Local Nature Reserve =

Local Nature Reserve in Cambridgeshire, England

Coordinates: 52.384°N 0.006°E

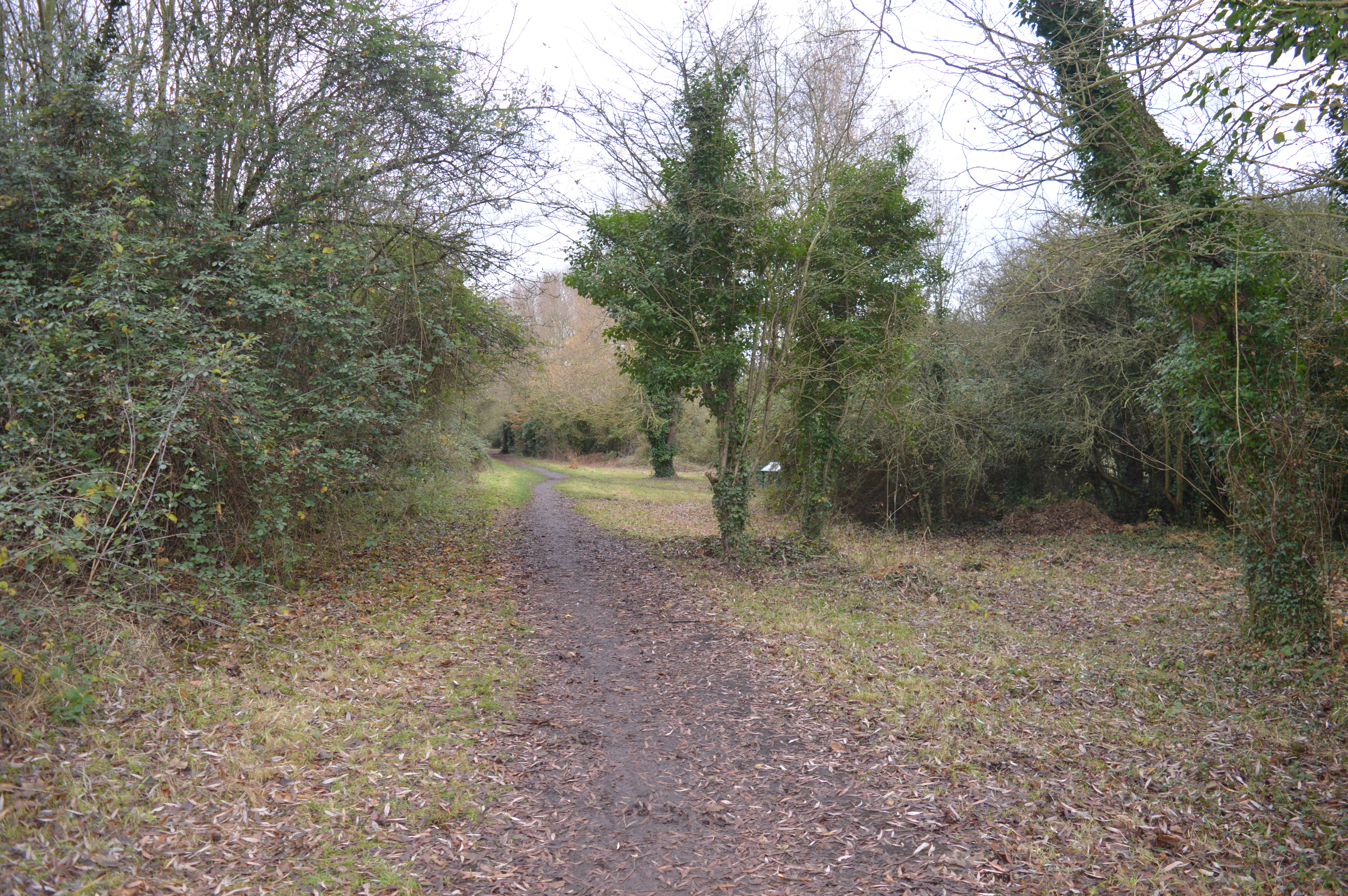
- Interactive map of Somersham Local Nature Reserve
- Type: Local Nature Reserve
- Location: Somersham, Cambridgeshire
- OS grid: TL 366 781
- Area: 8.9 hectares (22 acres)
- Manager: Cambridgeshire County Council and Somersham Parish Council

Somersham Local Nature Reserve is an 8.9 hectare Local Nature Reserve in Somersham in Cambridgeshire. It is owned and managed by Cambridgeshire County Council and Somersham Parish Council.

Habitats in this reserve are a lake, wetland, grassland and woodland. Invertebrates include grass snakes and common lizards, there are birds such as great crested grebes, and flora such as red bartsia and purple loosestrife.

There is access from Station Approach, named after the former Somersham railway station. The nature reserve includes a section of disused railway land, part of the March branch of the former Great Eastern Railway.
