= Trumpington Meadows Country Park =

Nature reserve in Cambridgeshire, England

Coordinates: 52.17°N 0.103°E

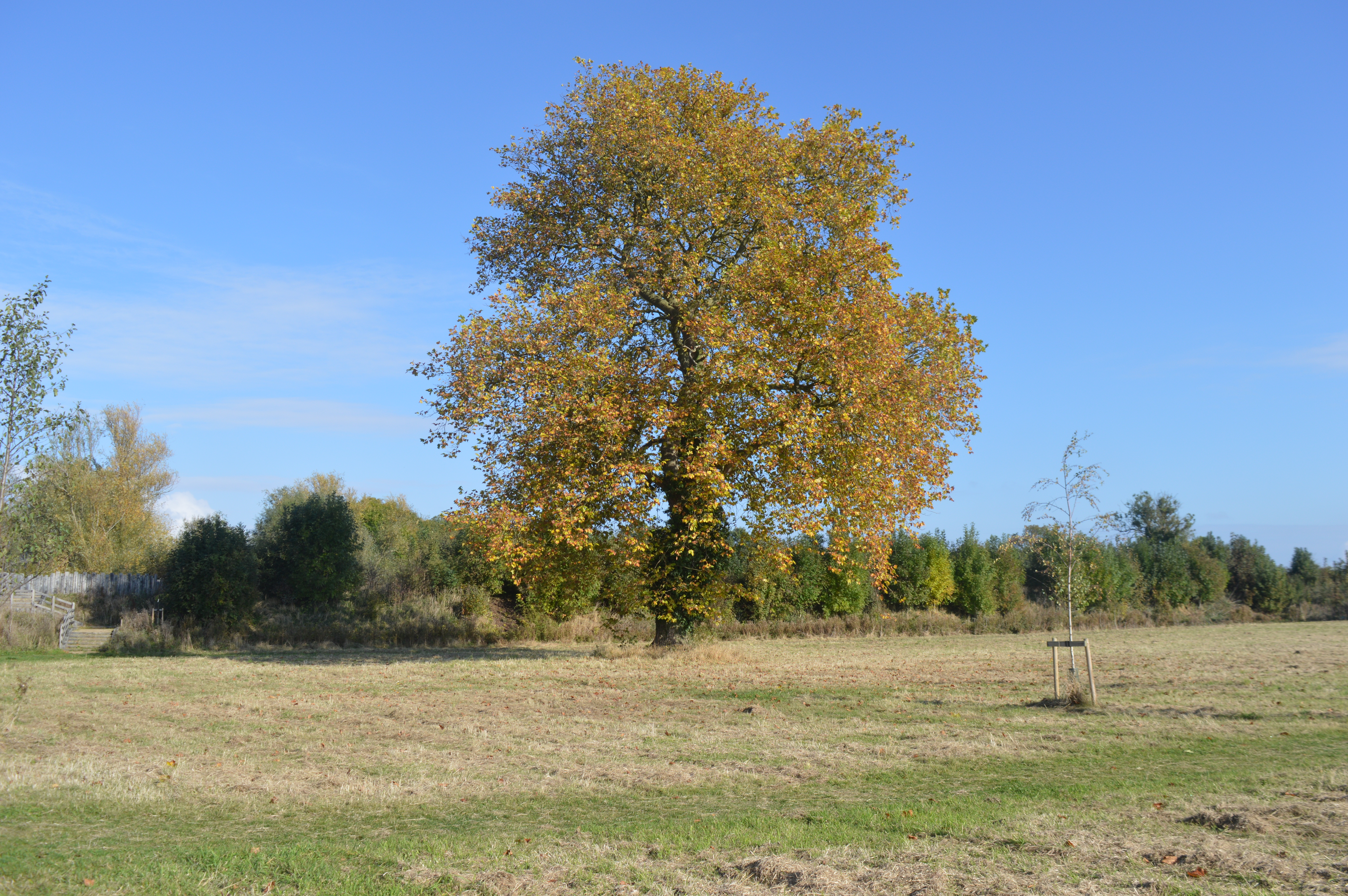
- Interactive map of Trumpington Meadows Country Park
- Type: Nature reserve
- Location: Trumpington, Cambridgeshire
- OS grid: TL 439 545
- Area: 58 hectares (140 acres)
- Manager: Wildlife Trust for Bedfordshire, Cambridgeshire and Northamptonshire

Trumpington Meadows Country Park is a 58 hectare nature reserve in Trumpington in Cambridgeshire. It is managed by the Wildlife Trust for Bedfordshire, Cambridgeshire and Northamptonshire.

This site has flower meadows, woodland, ponds, and is adjacent to the River Cam and Byron's Pool, where Lord Byron once swam. Fauna include otters, brown hares, muntjac deer, skylarks, lapwings, yellowhammers and meadow pipits.

There is access from Grantchester Road.

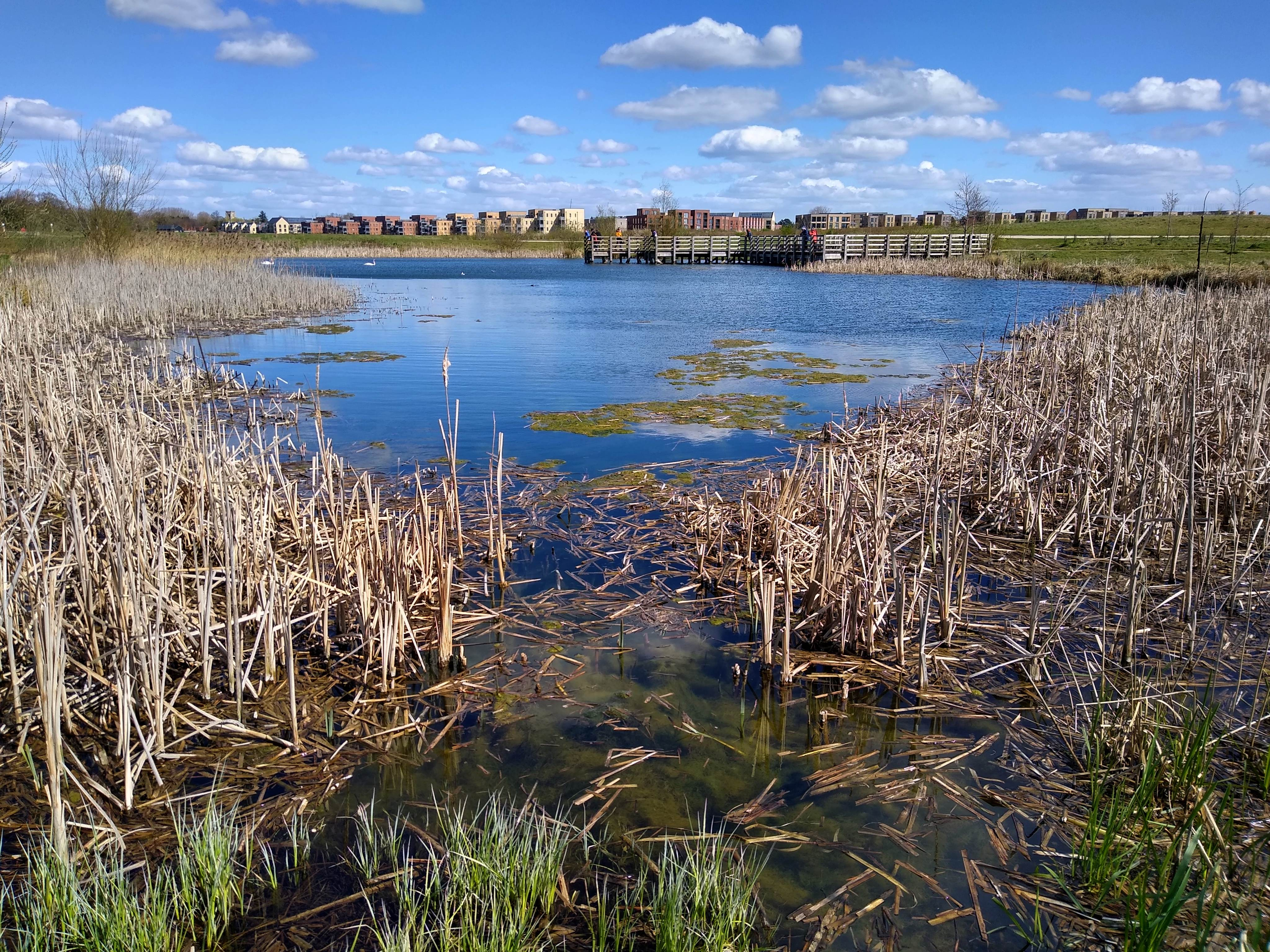
The balancing pond at Trumpington Meadows in April 2021

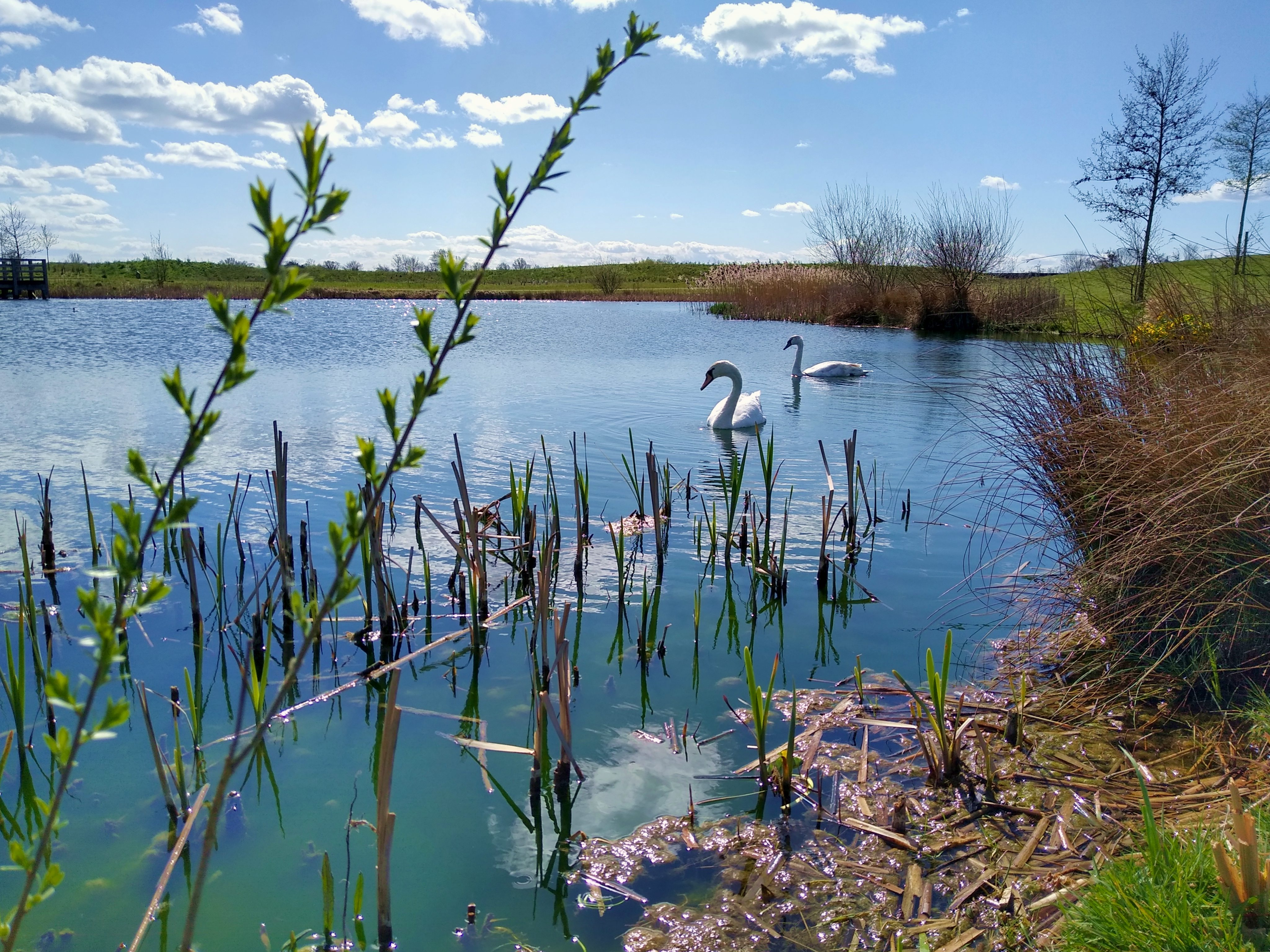
Swans at Trumpington Meadows in April 2021
