= Meldreth =

Village in South Cambridgeshire, England

Coordinates: 52.1°N 0.0°E

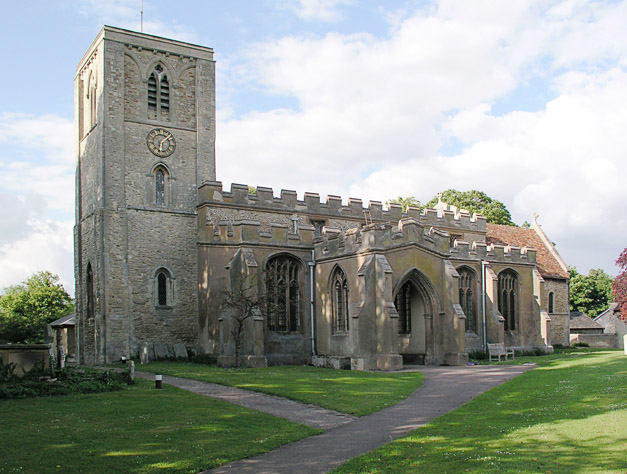
- Holy Trinity church

- Location within Cambridgeshire
- Population: 1,783 (2011)
- OS grid reference: TL375466
- Civil parish: Meldreth
- District: South Cambridgeshire
- Shire county: Cambridgeshire
- Region: East
- Country: England
- Sovereign state: United Kingdom
- Post town: ROYSTON
- Postcode district: SG8
- Dialling code: 01763
- UK Parliament: South Cambridgeshire

Meldreth is a village and civil parish in South Cambridgeshire, England, located around 10 miles (16 km) south-west of Cambridge. At the 2011 Census, the population of the parish was 1,783.

== History ==
A large Bronze Age hoard was found near Meldreth railway station in the nineteenth century that is now in the collections of the British Museum. The village of Meldreth grew in Saxon times, and the parish is home to Mettle Hill (formerly known as Motlowehyll) that was probably the original meeting place of Armingford Hundred.

Listed as Melrede in the Domesday Book of 1086, the village's name means "mill stream", named after the stream that rises at Melbourn Bury and flows north into the River Rhee. The Domesday Book has nine entries for Meldreth:

❧ ENTRY 1 ❧ Tenant-in-chief and Lord in 1086: Guy of Raimbeaucourt. Households: 15 smallholders. 1 slave. 3 cottagers. Ploughland: 5 ploughlands (land for). 1 lord's plough teams. 4 men's plough teams. Other resources: 0.5 lord's lands. Meadow 5 ploughs. 2 mills, value 0.53.

❧ ENTRY 2 ❧ Tenant-in-chief and Lord in 1086: Abbey of Ely (St Etheldreda), Households: 10 smallholders. 3 slaves. 3 cottagers. Ploughland: 7 ploughlands (land for). 1.5 lord's plough teams. 0.5 lord's plough teams possible. 3 men's plough teams. Other resources: 1.5 lord's lands. Meadow 5 ploughs. 1 mill, value 0.15. Phillimore reference: 5,31

❧ ENTRY 3 ❧ Tenant-in-chief in 1086: Earl Roger (of Shrewsbury). Lord in 1086: Abbey of Saint-Evroult. Households: 5 villagers. 3 smallholders. 2 slaves. Ploughland: 5 ploughlands (land for). 2 lord's plough teams. 3 men's plough teams. Other resources: Meadow 2 ploughs. 2 mills, value 0.66. Phillimore reference: 13,6

❧ ENTRY 4 ❧ Tenant-in-chief in 1086: Hardwin of Scales. Lord in 1086: Hugh {Pedefold}. Households: 1 slave. 3 cottagers. Ploughland: 2 ploughlands (land for). Other resources: Meadow 2 ploughs. 1 mill, value 0.26. 1 church. Phillimore reference: 26,30

❧ ENTRY 5 ❧ Tenant-in-chief and Lord in 1086: Abbey of Ely (St Etheldreda), Lord in 1086: Hardwin (of Scales). Other resources: 1 church. Phillimore reference: 5,32

❧ ENTRY 6 ❧ Tenant-in-chief and Lord in 1086: Hardwin of Scales. Ploughland: 0.5 ploughlands (land for). Phillimore reference: 26,29

❧ ENTRY 7 ❧ Tenant-in-chief and Lord in 1086: Abbey of Ely (St Etheldreda), Lord in 1086: Hardwin (of Scales). Phillimore reference: 5,30

❧ ENTRY 8 ❧ Tenant-in-chief in 1086: Count Alan (of Brittany). Lord in 1086: Kolsveinn. Households: 2 cottagers. Ploughland: 1 ploughland (land for). Other resources: Meadow 2 ploughs. 2 mills, value 0.9. . Phillimore reference: 14,32

❧ ENTRY 9 ❧ Tenant-in-chief and Lord in 1086: Abbey of Ely (St Etheldreda), Lord in 1086: Guy of Raimbeaucourt. Households: 10 freemen. Lord in 1066: Freemen, ten. Phillimore reference: 5,33

Due to its proximity to Cambridge, much of the land has at some time been owned by colleges of the University of Cambridge. In the early 16th century, Christ's College moved to its Meldreth estate to escape the plague.

In 1952, the Royal Train carrying King George VI's body passed through the station on its journey from Sandringham to London. Residents gathered on the platform to pay their last respects to the King.

The village still has a stocks and whipping post, the traditional medieval punishment, last used in the village in 1860.

== Church ==
The parish church, dedicated to the Holy Trinity since 1443, consists of a chancel, aisled nave with south porch, and a west tower housing eight bells. More peals have been rung at Holy Trinity than any other church. The chancel is unusually long and dates from the 12th century, perhaps indicating the existence of an earlier minster on the site. The tower dates from the late 12th century, with the top stage added in the late 13th century.

== Village life ==
The village, once famous for its fruit production, is now home to many commuters who work in Cambridge and London. Orchards still exist in Meldreth, and locally grown fruits and vegetables are sold in the village, most notably the Meldreth greengage.

The village retains its own railway station which opened in 1851. In 2001, local celebrations marked the 150th anniversary of Meldreth railway station, which serves the residents of Meldreth and the neighbouring village of Melbourn. Trains from the station run into Cambridge and London King's Cross.

Only one public house is still open; The British Queen has been open since the first half of the 19th century. The first recorded pub in the village was The Bell (also known as The Old Bell or The Blue Bell Inn) which was housed in a thatched building that was built in 1676 and first recorded as a public house in 1726. The Bell closed in 1910. The Railway Tavern opened in 1858 and closed in 1959. It latterly housed the recently closed Tavern Art Gallery. The Dumb Flea pub in Chiswick End closed in 1956 and is now a private house. Other former pubs include The Chequer, recorded in 1785 but believed to have closed soon after, and The Green Man which stood next to the brewery at North End and was open from 1808 till the late 19th century.

Meldreth is home to Meldreth Manor School, run by The Aurora Group, as well as home to Meldreth Primary School.

The village has a Local Nature Reserve, Melwood.

== Prime Meridian ==
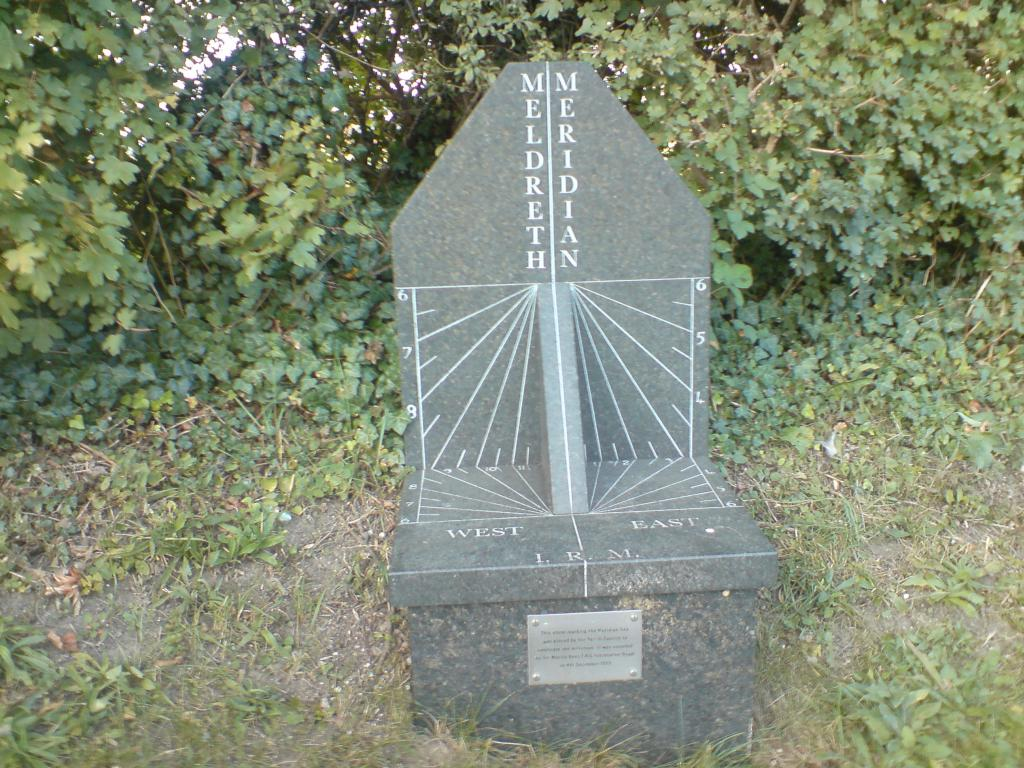
Prime Meridian marker in Meldreth.

The prime meridian runs through the village. A stone marker was erected near the western end of Fenny Lane, and unveiled in December 1999 by the Astronomer Royal, Sir Martin Rees.
