= Woodston Ponds =

Nature reserve in Peterborough, England

Coordinates: 52.568°N 0.264°W

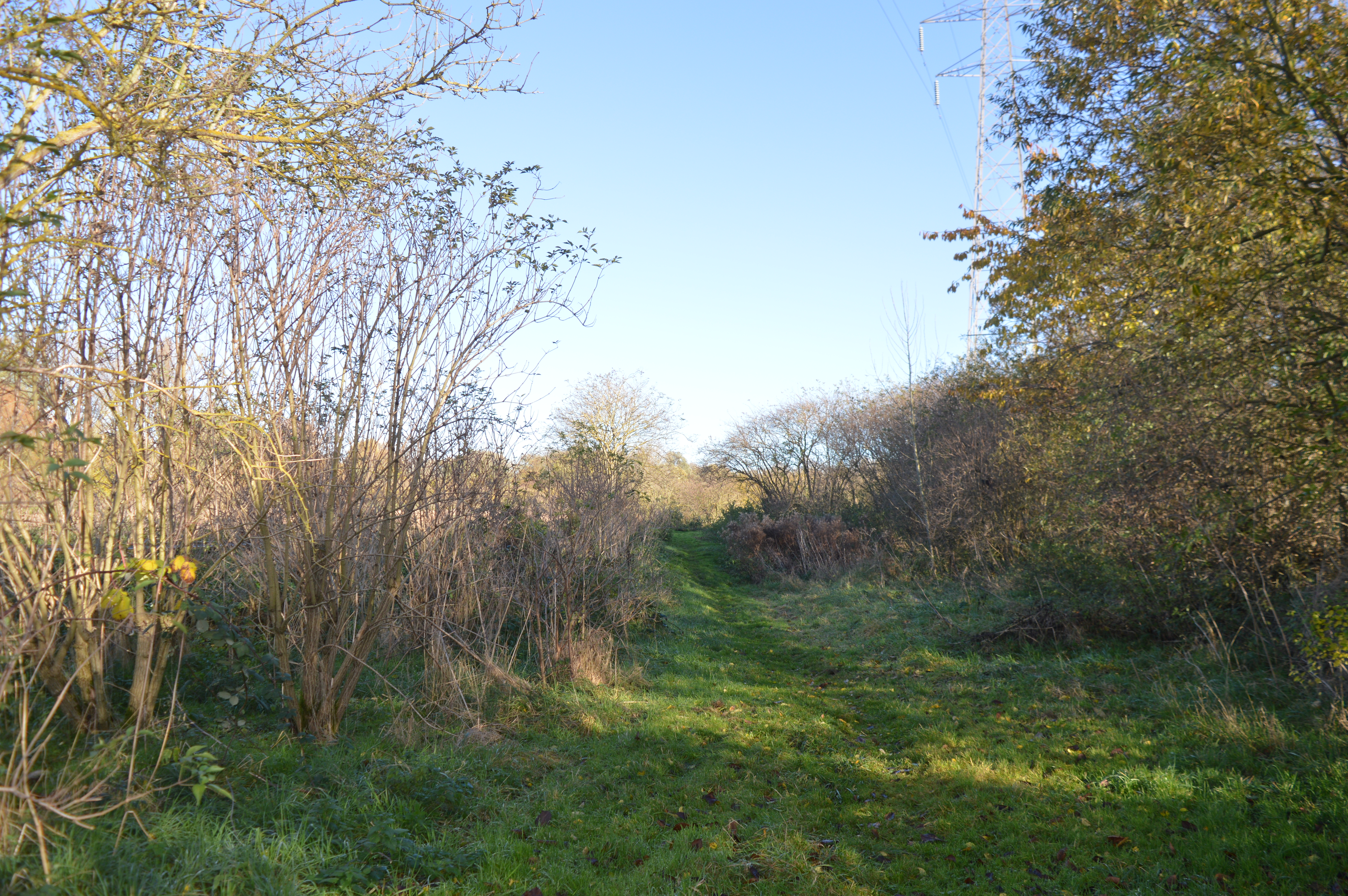
- Interactive map of Woodston Ponds
- Type: Local Nature Reserve
- Location: Peterborough, Cambridgeshire
- OS grid: TL 177 980
- Area: 8.9 hectares (22 acres)
- Manager: Wildlife Trust for Bedfordshire, Cambridgeshire and Northamptonshire

Woodston Ponds is an 8.9 hectare Local Nature Reserve between the River Nene and the Nene Valley Railway in Peterborough in Cambridgeshire. It is managed by the Wildlife Trust for Bedfordshire, Cambridgeshire and Northamptonshire.

The site was formerly settling ponds to remove washings from sugar beet. The east side has a lake with water birds such as grey herons, tufted ducks and pochards. In the west there is a reedbed which has pools and channels, with great crested newts and unusual species of water beetle.

There is access by crossing a footbridge over the river from Viersen Platz and turning right along a footpath.
