= Logan's Meadow =

Nature reserve in Cambridge, England

Coordinates: 52.212°N 0.141°E

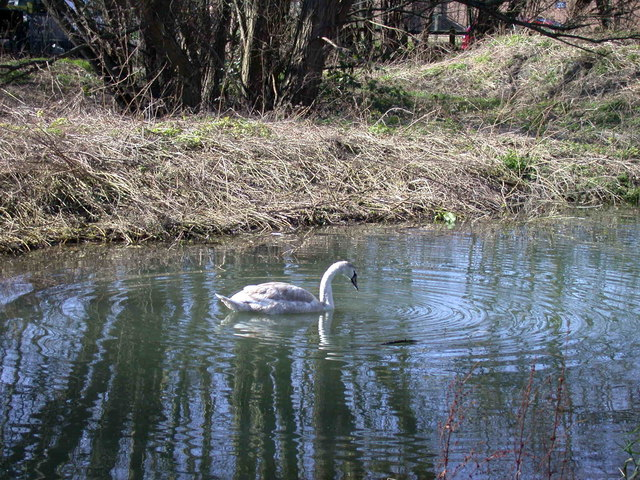
- Interactive map of Logan's Meadow
- Type: Local Nature Reserve
- Location: Cambridge
- OS grid: TL 463 592
- Area: 1.1 hectares (2.7 acres)
- Manager: Cambridge City Council and City Greenways Project

Logan's Meadow is a 1.1 hectares (2.7 acres) Local Nature Reserve in Cambridge. It is owned by Cambridge City Council and managed by the council together with City Greenways Project.

This site of the bank of the River Cam has pasture with tortoiseshell and comma butterflies, and flowers such as cow parsley and cuckoo flowers. Starling roost in trees in the autumn, and there are freshwater mussels in the river. The site was declared a Local Nature Reserve in 2005.

There is access from Logan's Way.
