= The Boardwalks =

Nature preserve in Peterborough, Cambridgeshire

Coordinates: 52.569°N 0.260°W

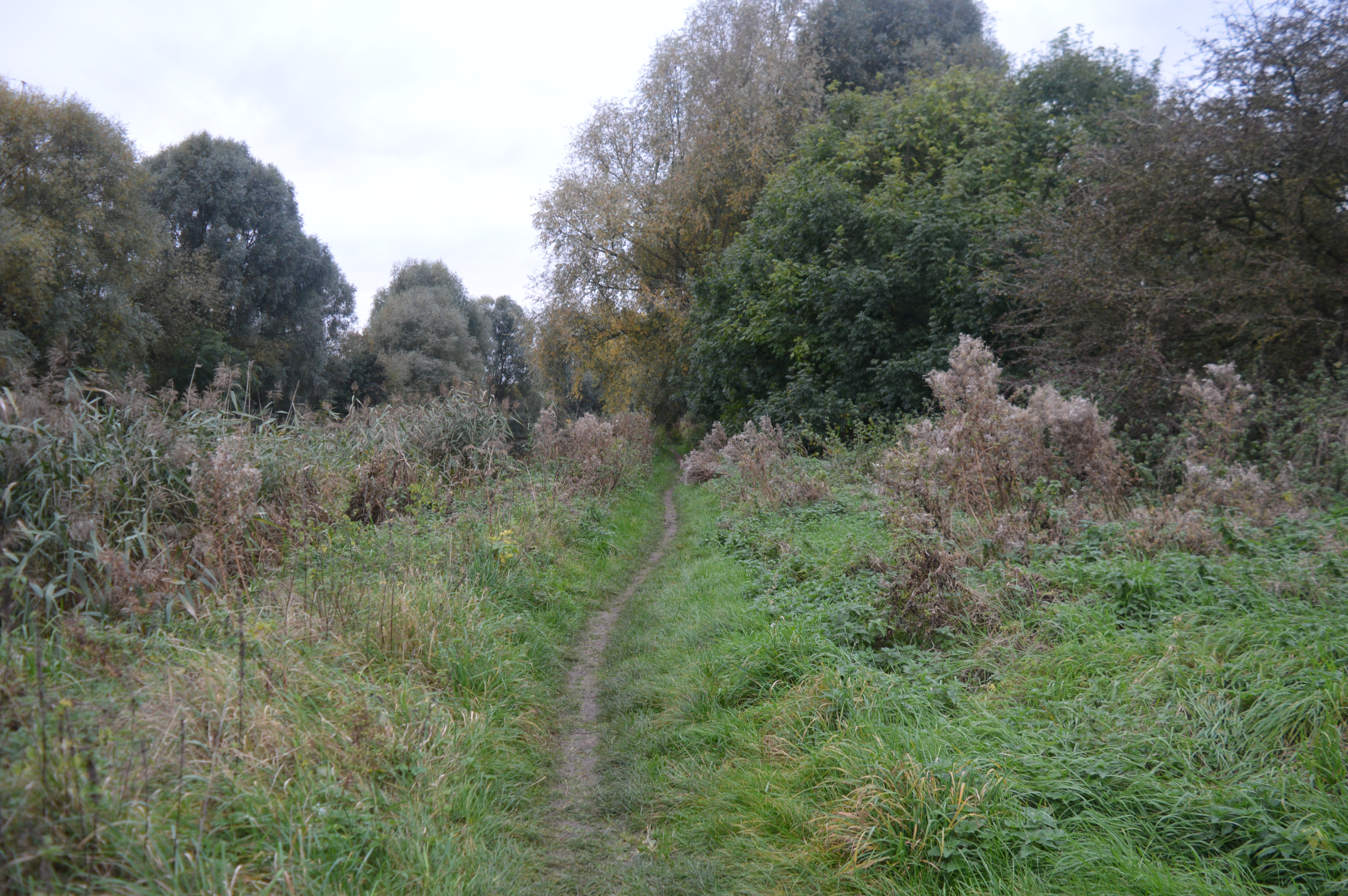
- Interactive map of The Boardwalks
- Type: Local Nature Reserve
- Location: Peterborough, Cambridgeshire
- OS grid: TL 180 982
- Area: 7.8 hectares (19 acres)
- Manager: Peterborough City Council

The Boardwalks is a 7.8 hectare Local Nature Reserve in Peterborough in Cambridgeshire. It is owned and managed by Peterborough City Council.

The site runs along the north bank of the River Nene. It has ponds with water beetles, toads, Great Crested Newts and smooth newts. Bats nest in large willows, and birds include herons and woodpeckers.

The area is accessible by a trail from the road known as Thorpe Meadows as well as one that runs beside the north bank of the River Nene (starting at a footbridge over a water channel south of Water End).
