= Kingston and Bourn Old Railway =

Local nature reserve in Cambridgeshire, England

Coordinates: 52.185°N 0.0428°W

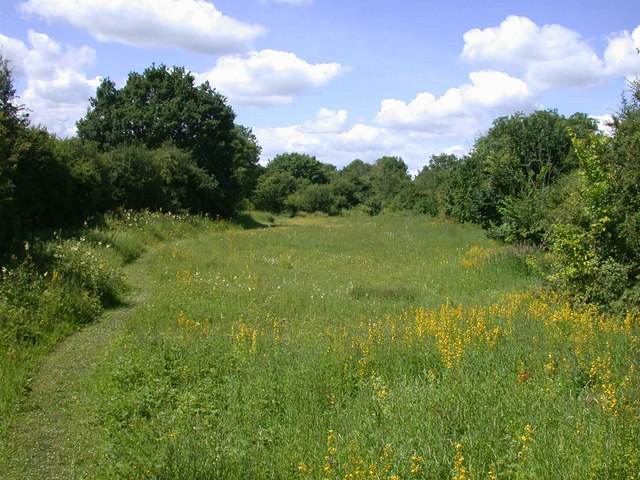
- Interactive map of Kingston and Bourn Old Railway
- Type: Local Nature Reserve
- Location: Kingston, Cambridgeshire, England
- OS grid: TL 339 559
- Area: 1.9 hectares (4.7 acres)
- Manager: Cambridgeshire County Council

Kingston and Bourn Old Railway or Kingston Amenity Area is a linear 1.9-hectare (4.7-acre) Local Nature Reserve between Kingston and Bourn in Cambridgeshire, England. It is owned and managed by Cambridgeshire County Council.

The sides of this old railway bank are woodland, with ash, field maple and oak the main trees, while the top of the bank is unimproved grassland. There is also an area of wetland with mature pollarded willows.

There is access from the B1046 road, which runs along its southern boundary.
