= Little Paxton Pits =

Protected area in Cambridgeshire, England

Coordinates: 52.258°N 0.245°W

- Site of Special Scientific Interest
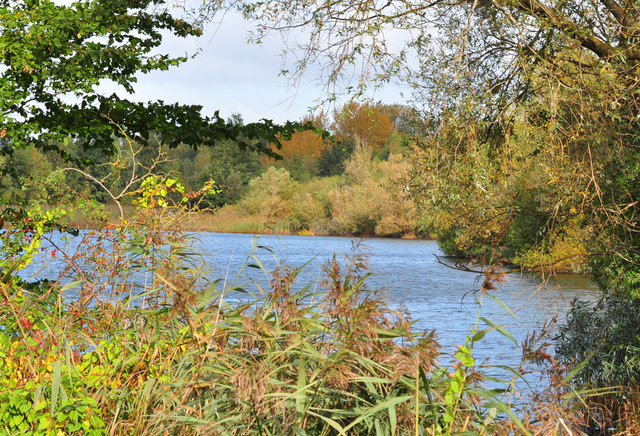
- Location of Little Paxton Pits.
- Area of search: Cambridgeshire
- Grid reference: TL 199 637
- Interest: Biological
- Area: 127.4 hectares
- Notification date: 1986
- Location map: Magic Map

Little Paxton Pits is a 127.4-hectare (315-acre) biological Site of Special Scientific Interest in Little Paxton in Cambridgeshire. Part of it is also a 60 hectare Local Nature Reserve (LNR).

These flooded former gravel pits are of national importance for wintering wildfowl, especially gadwalls. There are several nationally rare flies, such as Spilogona scutulata, Limnophora scrupulosa, Dolichopus andulusiacus and Lispocephala falculata. Flora include common spotted-orchids and hare’s-foot clover.

There is access to the LNR from the High Street.
