= Mare Fen =

Nature reserve in Cambridgeshire, England

Coordinates: 52.309°N 0.0022°E

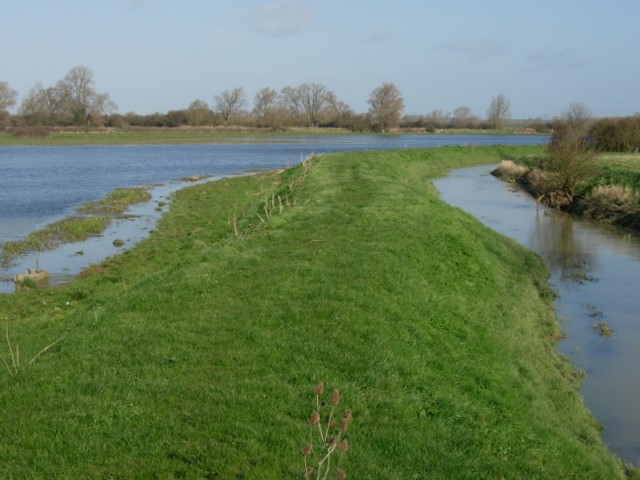
- Interactive map of Mare Fen
- Type: Local Nature Reserve
- Location: Swavesey, Cambridgeshire, England
- OS grid: TL 366 698
- Area: 16.3 hectares (40 acres)
- Manager: Not known

Mare Fen is a 16.3 hectare Local Nature Reserve north of Swavesey in Cambridgeshire, England. It is owned by Cambridgeshire County Council, and was formerly managed by the Cambridgeshire and Isle of Ely Naturalists Trust (now part of the Wildlife Trust for Bedfordshire, Cambridgeshire and Northamptonshire), but as of December 2016 it is not listed on the Trust's web site. In 2015 Swavesey Parish Council expressed concern at the failure of the Environment Agency to carry out flood prevention works at Mare Fen.

This pasture in the floodplain of the River Great Ouse is used for grazing in the summer and allowed to flood in the winter. It has wildfowl such as mute swans, wigeons, teal and shovelers, mammals include badgers and muntjac deer. There are diverse aquatic plants.

There is access from Station Road.
