= St Denis Church, East Hatley =

De-consecrated church in Cambridgeshire, England

St Denis' Church, East Hatley
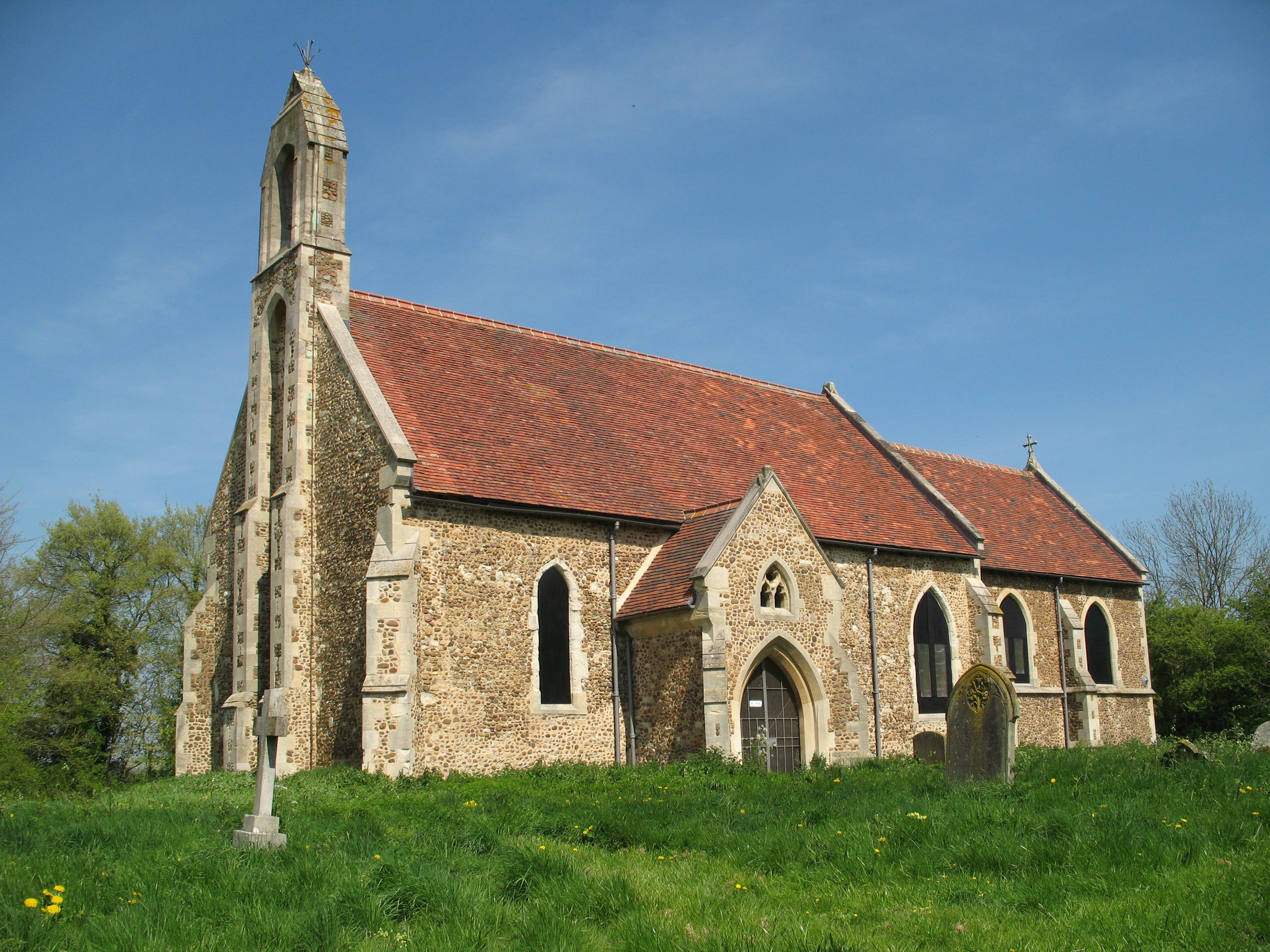

- Location within England
- Interactive map of St Denis' Church, East Hatley
- Type: Local Nature Reserve
- Location: East Hatley, Cambridgeshire, England
- OS grid: TL 285 505
- Coordinates: 52°08′17″N 0°07′24″W
- Area: 200 square metres
- Manager: Friends of Friendless Churches

St Denis' Church, East Hatley is a deconsecrated church in East Hatley in Cambridgeshire, England. It is a listed building, Grade 2*, and the building and its churchyard (which is still consecrated) are a 200 square metre Local Nature Reserve. It is owned and managed by the Friends of Friendless Churches.

== History ==
The church dates to the early thirteenth century and was restored by William Butterfield in 1874. It was last used for worship in 1959, and in 1985 it was deconsecrated and transferred to South Cambridgeshire District Council. By 2003 its condition had severely deteriorated, and as it is a listed building the council agreed to pay for its restoration. On 30 November 2016 ownership was transferred to the Friends of Friendless Churches.

The churchyard is mainly neutral grassland, but some is calcareous, and its grasses and flowers are diverse. Flowers include hoary plantain, rough hawkbit and oxlip.

Access is via a footpath from the road called East Hatley in the village of East Hatley.
