= Little Downham =

Village in Cambridgeshire, England

Coordinates: 52.433°N 0.233°E

- Location within Cambridgeshire
- Population: 2,589 (2011)
- OS grid reference: TL518841
- Civil parish: Downham
- District: East Cambridgeshire
- Shire county: Cambridgeshire
- Region: East
- Country: England
- Sovereign state: United Kingdom
- Post town: Ely
- Postcode district: CB6

Situated in the east of Cambridgeshire, the village of Little Downham is located 3 miles (5 km) north of the city of Ely. The Parish of Downham comprises Little Downham and Pymoor. It has an approximate population of 2660 with approximately 35 miles for footpaths around the parish. The population was measured at the 2021 Census as 3,028. It was one of only two sites in Cambridgeshire to be covered by the Survey of English Dialects.

== History ==
Isle of Ely 1648 by J Blaeu

In the Domesday Book of 1086 the village is called Duneham. At the time the Fens were mostly flooded, and the village is on a small rise of solid ground (visible today), so there may have been 'dunes' there.

In a map from 1648 (above), 'Downham' is shown at the north-west edge of the Isle of Ely, hence its historic name of 'Downham-in-the-Isle'.

== Church ==
The village's church, dedicated to St Leonard, dates back to the 12th century, though it has been considerably modified since and restored multiple times. Kelly's Directory, a British business and trade directory, recorded in 1929 that "The church of St. Leonard is a structure of rubble in the Transition Norman and Early English styles, consisting of chancel, clerestoried nave of five bays, aisles, south porch and an embattled western tower, with pinnacles, containing 4 bells, two of which are dated 1659: the clerestory windows are very small and are deeply splayed internally : the inner porch doorway is a good example of Transition Norman : in the chancel is an arcaded double piscina with cinquefoil-headed arch, but portions of the arch and one basin have been cut away to admit the insertion of a window: the rood screen is of carved oak: the chancel was restored and a vestry and organ chamber erected in 1890, at a cost of £1,144: in 1897 and 1899 extensive restorations were carried out at a cost of £800: the church had been previously reseated, and now affords 300 sittings: the north aisle was restored in 1912. The register dates from the year 1558, but is not continuous."

== Village Hall ==
Little Downham's Village Hall is a Grade II-listed building and was constructed in 1779 "on the site of the former guildhall as both a boys' school and the village workhouse. In 1886 the workhouse was altered to become a girls' school and the building remained in use as a school until 1960. The infants school was on a separate site in what is now the allotments and the site is marked with a plaque. A new school was built nearby on land donated by the feoffees and this building has since been replaced on the same site. The current village hall was opened in 1974 and has undergone major refurbishment in that time."

== Bishop's Palace ==
The village contains the grade II listed remains of the old Bishop's Palace formerly used by the Bishops of Ely.

== Local Nature Reserve ==
Little Downham Local Nature Reserve is situated adjacent to the Bishop's Walk. It consists of three sections of land, measuring a total of 17 acres (6.6 hectares), and is the first designated Local Nature Reserve in East Cambridgeshire.

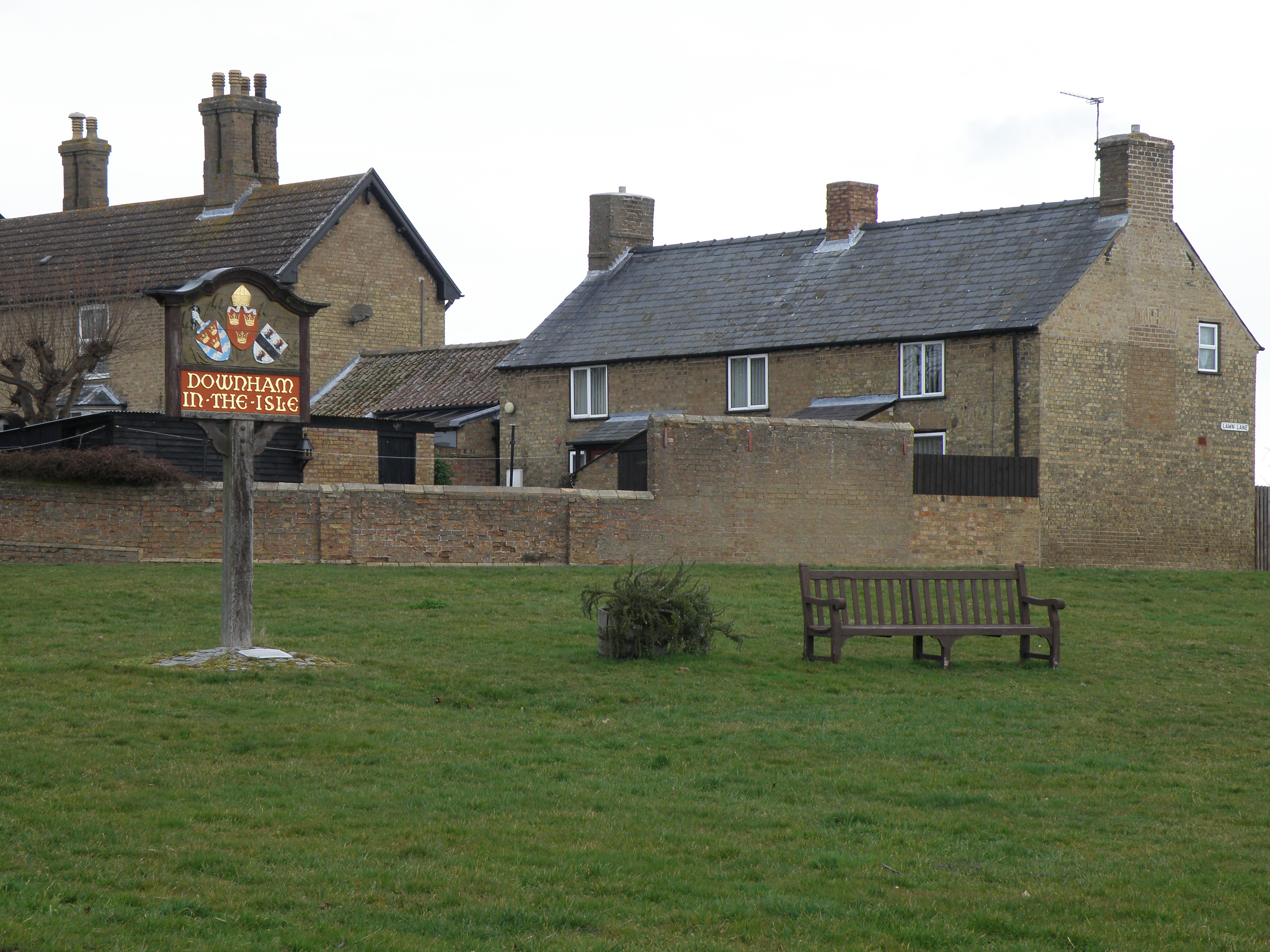
Village sign showing its historic name of 'Downham in the Isle'.

== Village life ==
The village retains Victorian Grade II-listed pub and Thai restaurant (The Plough Inn, now officially called Thai Plough), a recently refurbished hotel, bar, and restaurant (The Anchor Inn), a church, a village shop and post office, a fish and chip shop, a car dealership, and Grade II-listed Village Hall. The village also has a preschool and primary school as well as a sports area purchased by the council in the early 1960s which includes a pavilion and cricket ground, three football pitches, tennis courts, a basketball court, BMX dirt track, youth shelter and playground.

Each year a village fete is staged in June and in the same month a Medieval Fair is held just outside the village. In September the local primary school organises a Scarecrow Fair that sees the village lined with Scarecrows for the week building up to the fair. The annual Ely New Year's Eve 10k Race, organised by Ely Runners, both begins and ends in Little Downham. The 2011 race featured 700 runners and involved one circuit of the fen around Little Downham.
