= Isleham Nature Reserve =

Park in Cambridgeshire, England

Coordinates: 52.328°N 0.402°E

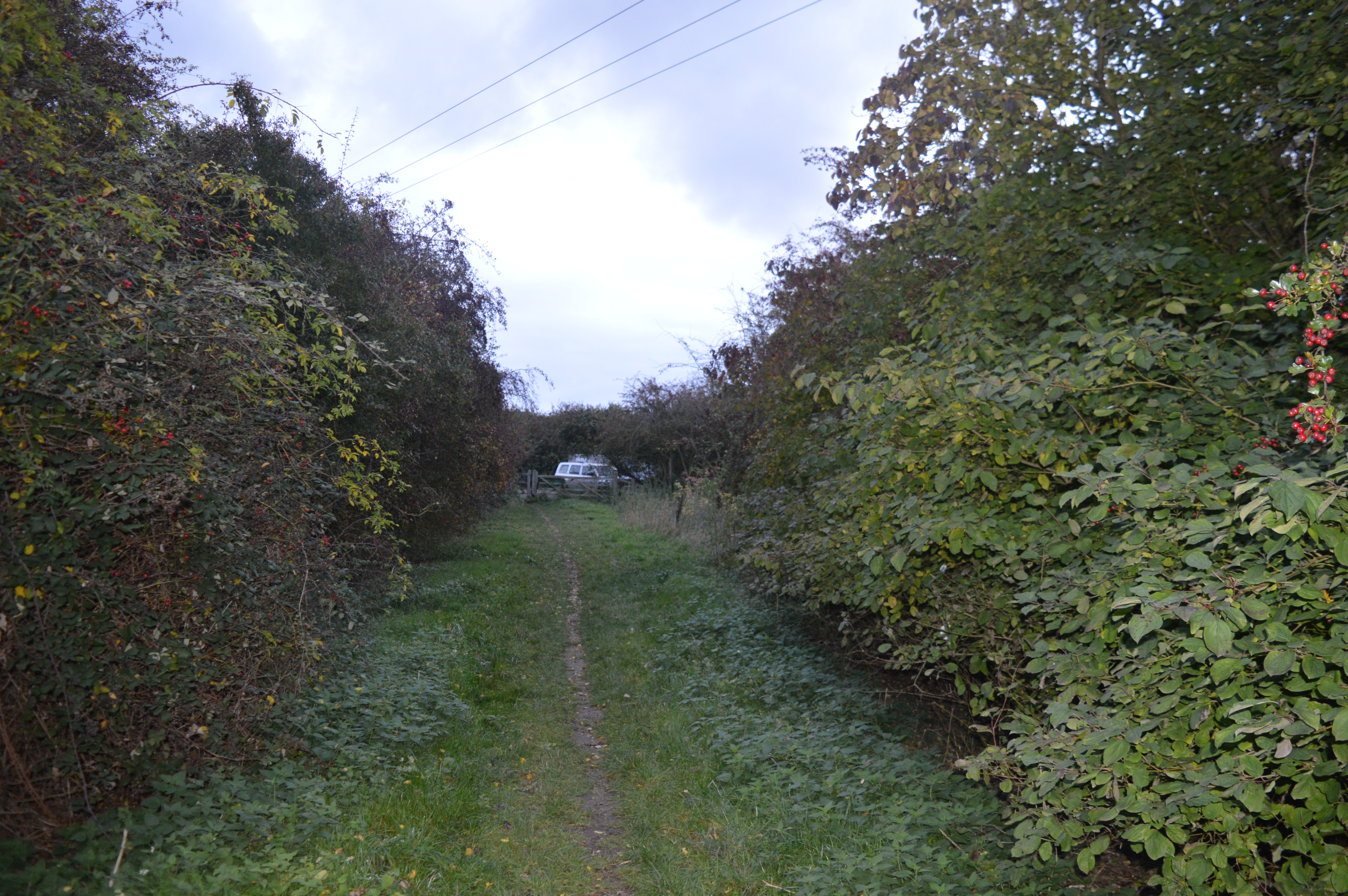
- Interactive map of Isleham Nature Reserve
- Type: Local Nature Reserve
- Location: Isleham, Cambridgeshire
- OS grid: TL 637 726
- Area: 1.1 hectares (2.7 acres)
- Manager: Cambridgeshire County Council and Friends of Isleham Nature Reserves

Isleham Nature Reserve is a 1.1 hectare Local Nature Reserve in Isleham in Cambridgeshire. It is owned by Cambridgeshire County Council and managed by the council together with the Friends of Isleham Nature Reserves.

The site is a stretch of a former railway line. It is grassland and hedgerows with a wide variety of fauna and flora. There are flowering plants such as field scabious, greater knapweed, St John's wort, wild marjoram and bladder campion.

There is access from Fordham Road.
