= Barnwell East =

Nature reserve in Cambridge, UK

Coordinates: 52.203°N 0.161°E

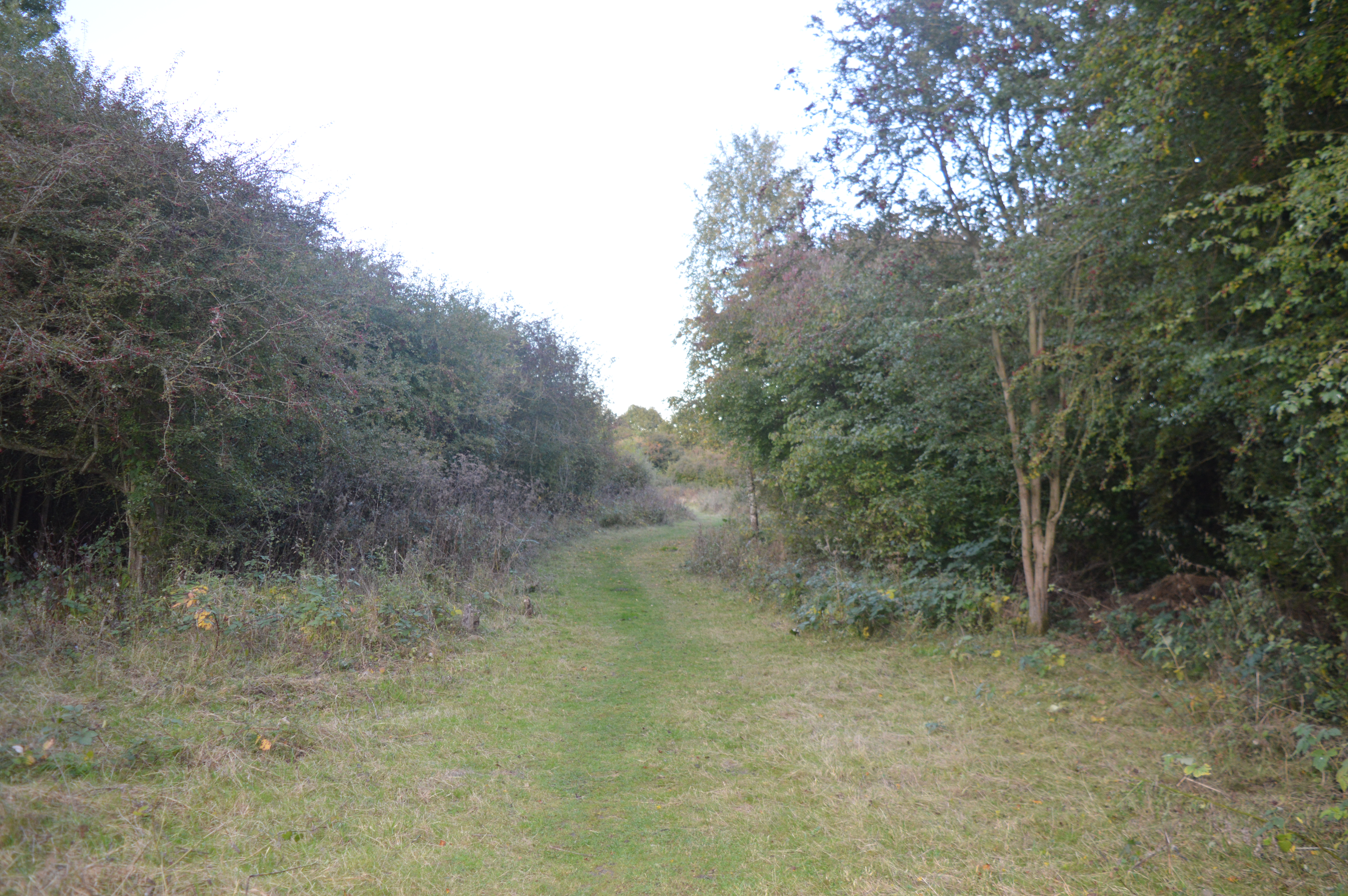
- Interactive map of Barnwell East
- Type: Local Nature Reserve
- Location: Cambridge, Cambridgeshire
- OS grid: TL 478 583
- Area: 2.6 hectares (6.4 acres)
- Manager: Cambridge City Council

Barnwell East is a 2.6 hectare Local Nature Reserve in Cambridge. It is owned and managed by Cambridge City Council.

The site has woodland, a pond, scrub and grassland. Flora include blackthorns, hawthorns and bee orchids, there are birds such as blackcaps and willow warblers, and common blue and meadow brown butterflies.

There is an entrance at the junction of Uphall Road and Nuttings Road.

== See also ==
- Barnwell West
