= Little Downham Local Nature Reserve =

Nature reserve in Cambridgeshire, England

Coordinates: 52.427°N 0.234°E

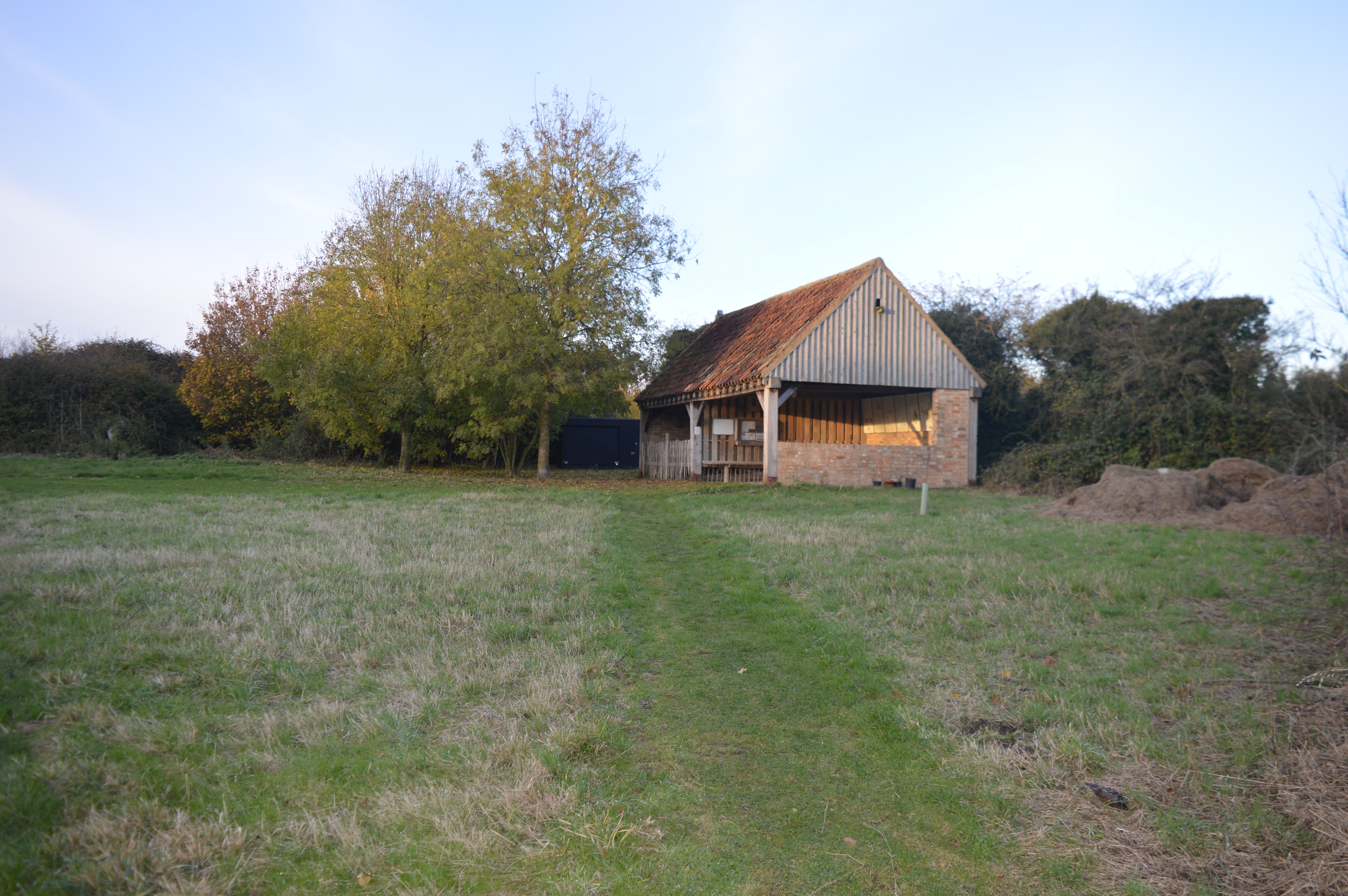
- Interactive map of Little Downham Local Nature Reserve
- Type: Local Nature Reserve
- Location: Little Downham, Cambridgeshire
- OS grid: TL 524 834
- Area: 6.6 hectares (16 acres)
- Manager: Downham Parish Conservation Volunteers

Little Downham Local Nature Reserve is a 6.6 hectare Local Nature Reserve in Little Downham in Cambridgeshire. It is owned by Little Downham Parish Council and managed by Downham Parish Conservation Volunteers.

The site consists of three areas of land, Pingle Wood, Myles Meadow and The Holts. Myles Meadow has two ponds and is seasonally grazed by cattle. Holts Meadow has a pond with many dragonflies and damselflies, including the emperor and scarce chaser dragonflies.

There is an access to Myles Meadow and Pingle Wood from Hurst Lane, and Clayway Lane runs along the southern edge of Myles Meadow to The Holts.
