= Melwood Local Nature Reserve =

Nature reserve in Cambridgeshire, England

Coordinates: 52.095°N 0.011°E

Melwood
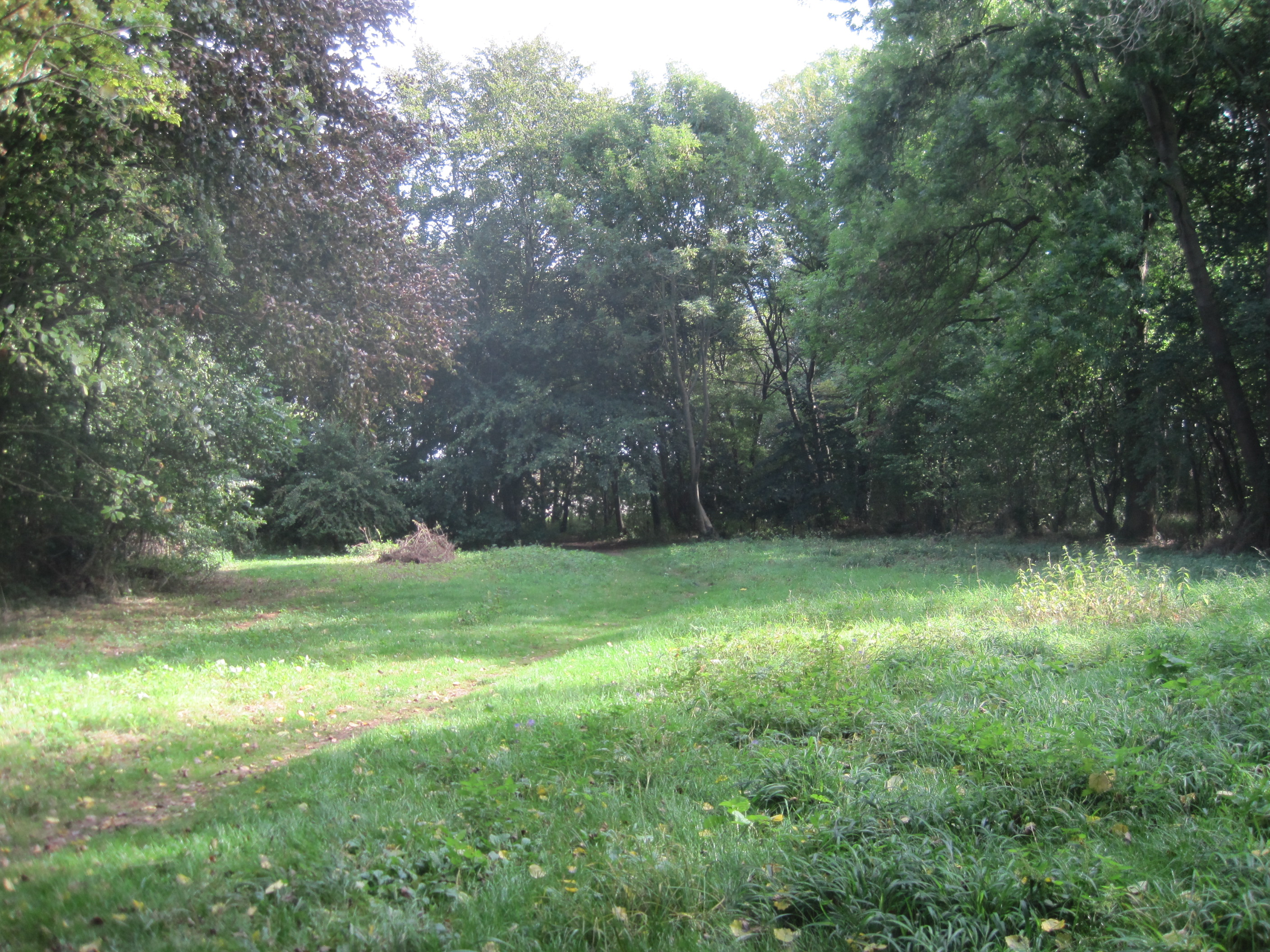
- Interactive map of Melwood
- Type: Local Nature Reserve
- Location: Meldreth, Cambridgeshire, England
- OS grid: TL 378 459
- Area: 0.6 hectares (1.5 acres)
- Manager: Melwood Conservation Group

Melwood is a 0.6 hectare Local Nature Reserve in Meldreth in Cambridgeshire, England. It is owned by Cambridgeshire County Council and managed by the Melwood Conservation Group.

This is a woodland site next to the River Mel, with trees such as ash, hawthorn, sycamore, beech and silver birch. Ground flora include dog violet and cow parsley, while traveller's joy provides food for moths. Tawny owls and pipistrelle bats roost on ivy.

There is access by a footpath from Flambards Close.
