= Byron's Pool =

Nature reserve in Cambridgeshire, England

Coordinates: 52°10′17″N 0°06′00″E

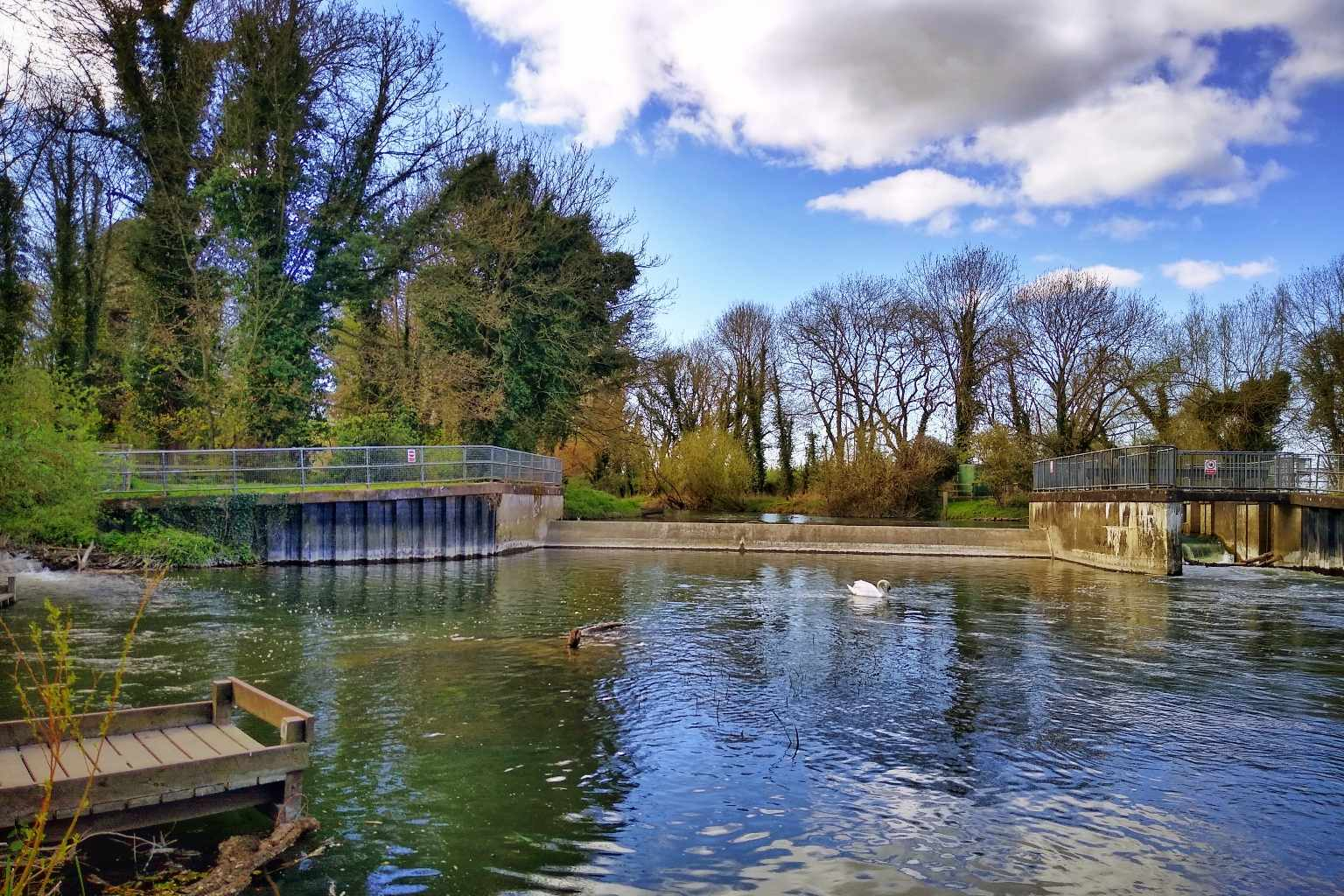
- The weir at Byron's Pool LNR
- Interactive map of Byron's Pool
- Type: Local Nature Reserve
- Location: Grantchester, Cambridgeshire
- OS grid: TL 4370 5465
- Area: 4.4 hectares (11 acres)
- Manager: Cambridge City Council and City Greenways Project

Byron's Pool is a 4.4 hectare Local Nature Reserve in Grantchester in Cambridgeshire. It is managed by Cambridge City Council and the City Greenways Project.

The site is named after Lord Byron, who used to swim in the water. It is a pool and adjacent woodland next to the River Cam and Trumpington Meadows. Birds include little grebes and grey wagtails, and there are frogs, butterflies, damselflies and dragonflies.

There is access from Grantchester Road.

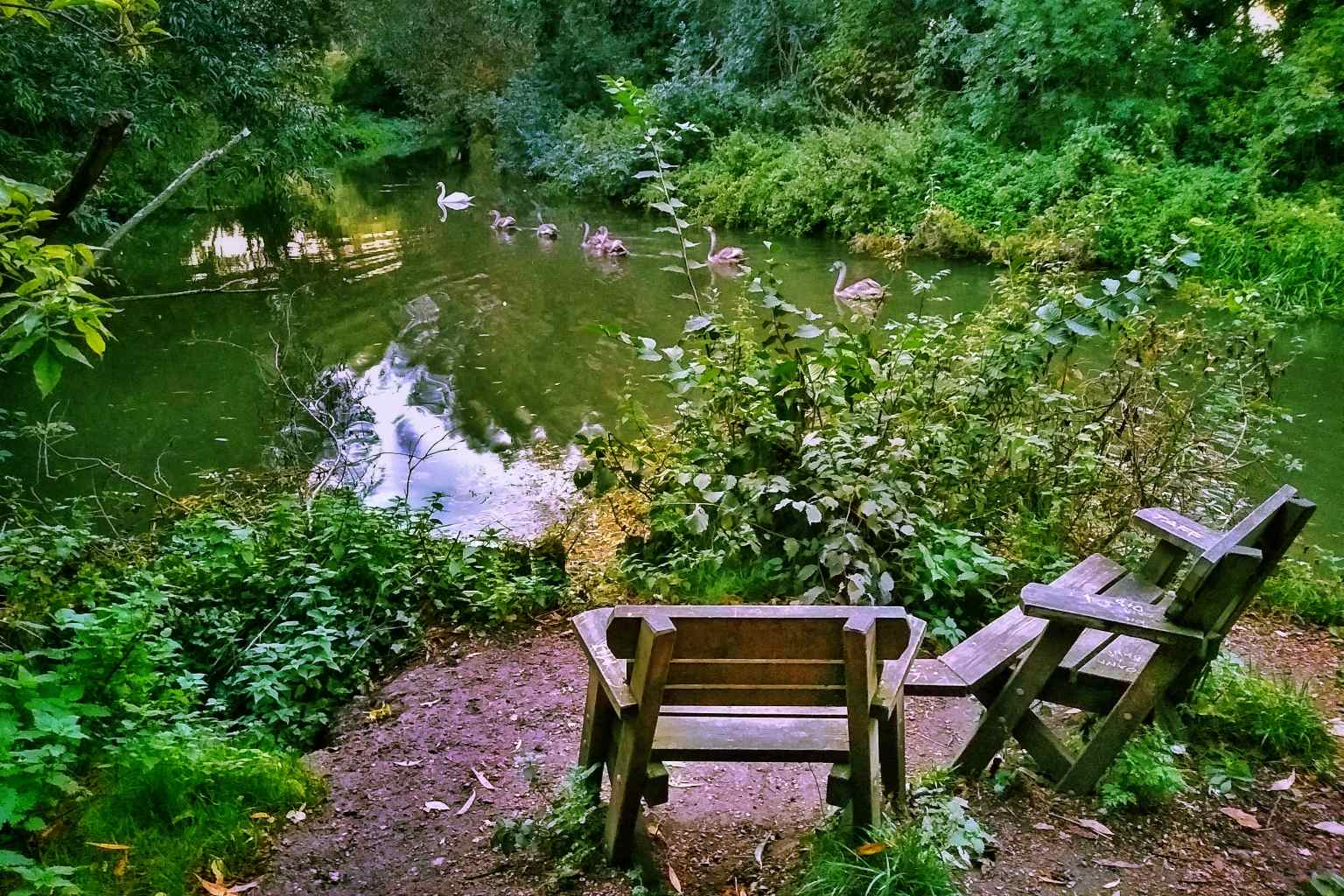
Seating by the upper river in Byron's Pool Local Nature Reserve
