= Grimeshaw Wood =

Nature reserve in United Kingdom

Coordinates: 52.594°N 0.289°W

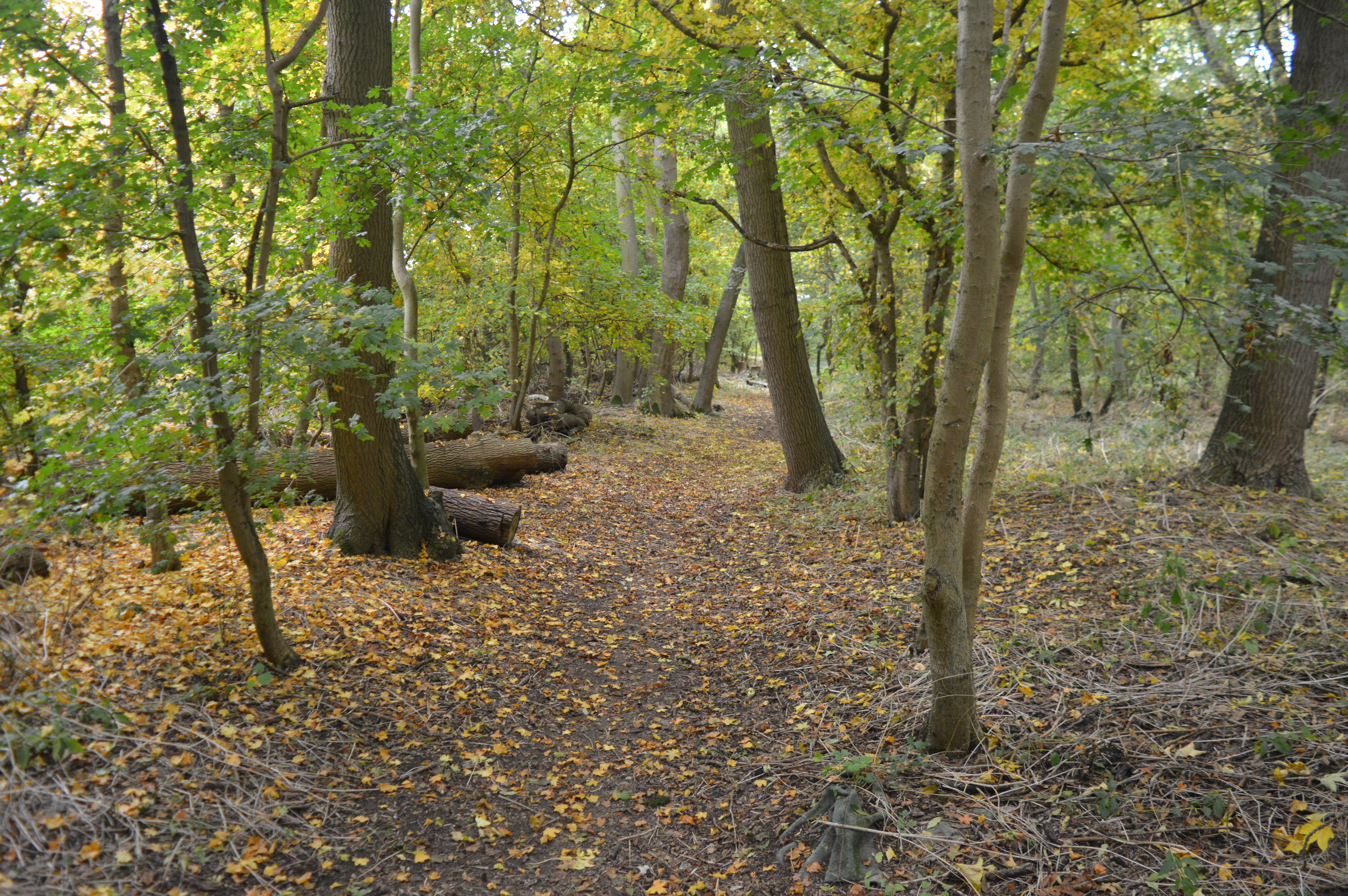
- Interactive map of Grimeshaw Wood
- Type: Local Nature Reserve
- Location: Peterborough, Cambridgeshire
- OS grid: TF 160 010
- Area: 16.8 hectares (42 acres)
- Manager: Peterborough Environment City Trust & Peterborough City Council

Grimeshaw Wood is a 16.8-hectare (42-acre) Local Nature Reserve on the western outskirts of Peterborough in Cambridgeshire. It is owned by Peterborough City Council, and managed by the council together with the Peterborough Environment City Trust.

This site is ancient woodland in three adjacent areas. Flora include nettle-leaved bellflowers, and there are resident pipistrelle bats.

There is access from Bretton Way, which bisects the site.

An environmental bio-study is currently underway to and record the true diversity of flora and fauna in this ancient woodland. On 8 January 2022 a pair of tawny owls were noted. Other bird species noted include buzzard, red kite, wood pigeon, stock dove, great tit, coal tit, robin, blue tit, lesser spotted woodpecker, green woodpecker, blackbird, brambling, pheasant, collared dove, tree creeper.
