= Coldham's Common =

Nature reserve in Cambridge, England

Coordinates: 52.206°N 0.153°E

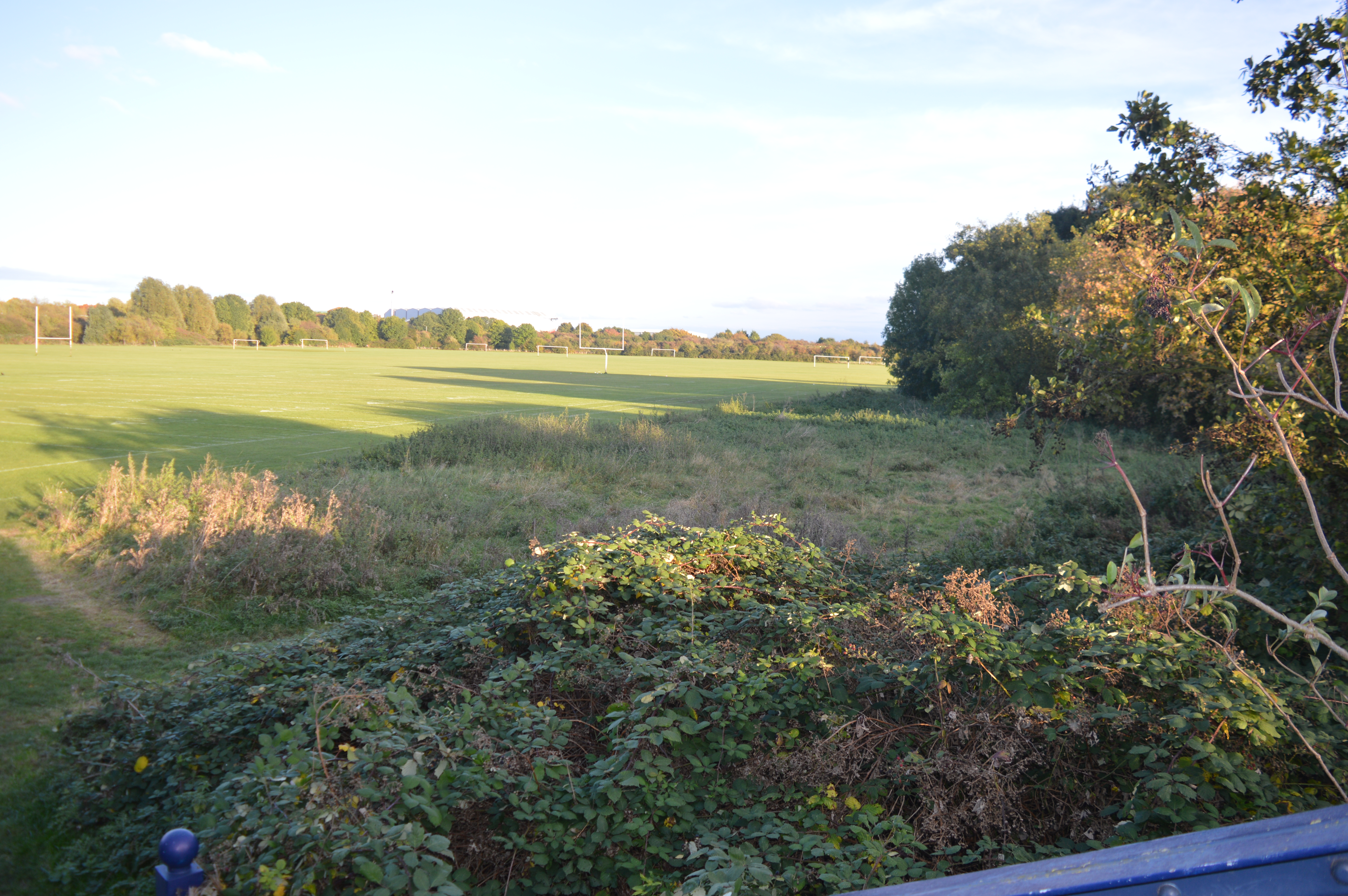
- Interactive map of Coldham's Common
- Type: Local Nature Reserve
- Location: Cambridge, Cambridgeshire
- OS grid: TL 472 586
- Area: 49.3 hectares (122 acres)
- Manager: Cambridge City Council

Coldham's Common is a 49.3 hectare local nature reserve in Cambridge. It is owned and managed by Cambridge City Council.

This site has areas of unimproved grassland, which have anthills of yellow meadow ants. There is also scrub and woodland. Flora include spiny rest harrow, upright brome and bee orchid.

There is access from Coldham's Lane.

== History ==
Coldham's Green was marked on a field map of 1300, and by 1700 it had become a Green Common. In the 19th century a rifle range was built there, but this was soon displaced by a new railway line to Newmarket.
