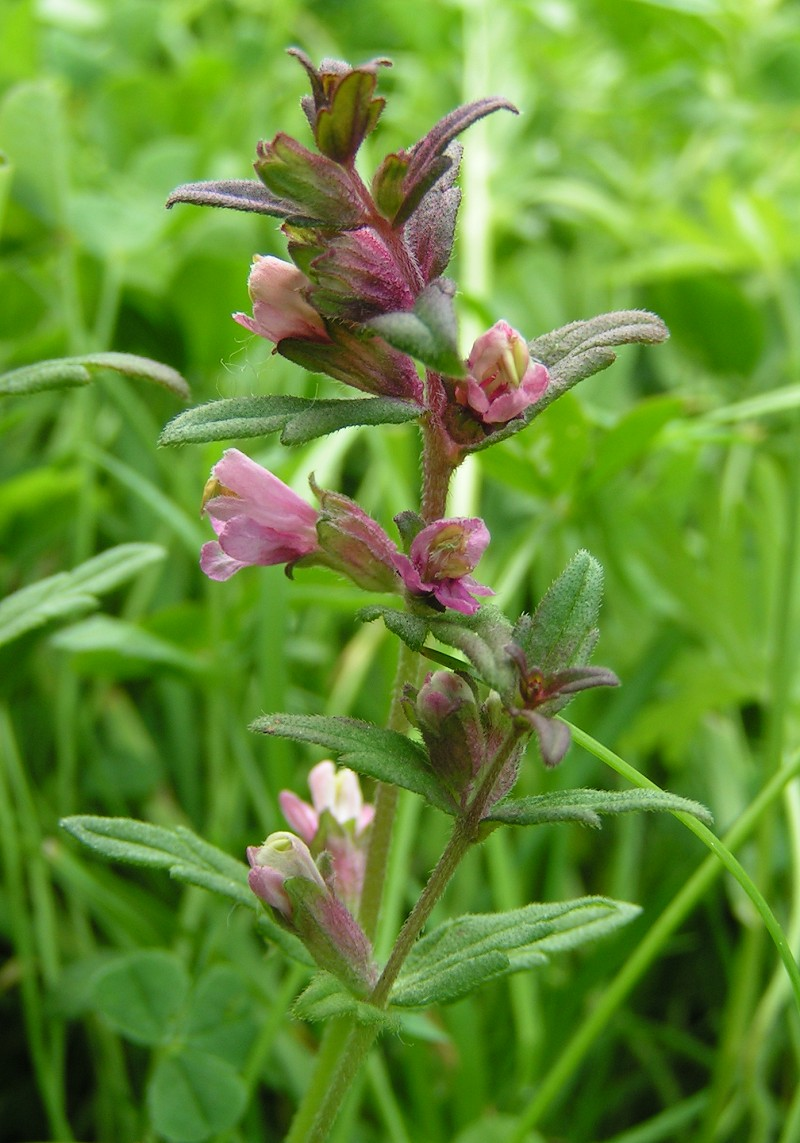

Scientific classification
- Kingdom: Plantae
- Clade: Embryophytes
- Clade: Tracheophytes
- Clade: Spermatophytes
- Clade: Angiosperms
- Clade: Eudicots
- Clade: Asterids
- Order: Lamiales
- Family: Orobanchaceae
- Genus: Odontites
- Species: O. vernus

Binomial name
- Odontites vernus Dumort.

= Odontites vernus =

Species of flowering plant in the broomrape family

Odontites vernus, the red bartsia, is a wild flower from the family Orobanchaceae native to Europe and Asia and occurring as an alien in North America. The red bartsia is a common plant in low-fertility soils, where it lives partially as a parasite on the roots of grasses. The red bartsia has pinkish and red flowers from June to September. They prefer dry conditions and full sun light exposure and are pollinated by bees and wasps.

Over the last 70 years, the red bartsia has disappeared from many woodland locations in the English county of Dorset.

In Manitoba, Canada, the plant known as red bartsia is considered a weed.

== Etymology ==
Odontites is derived from Greek and means 'tooth-related', a name which is in reference to Pliny the Elder using it to treat toothaches. Vernus means 'of the spring' (vernal).
